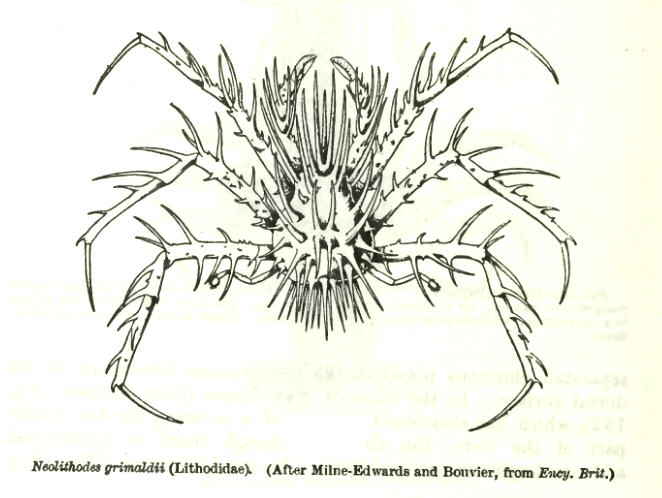

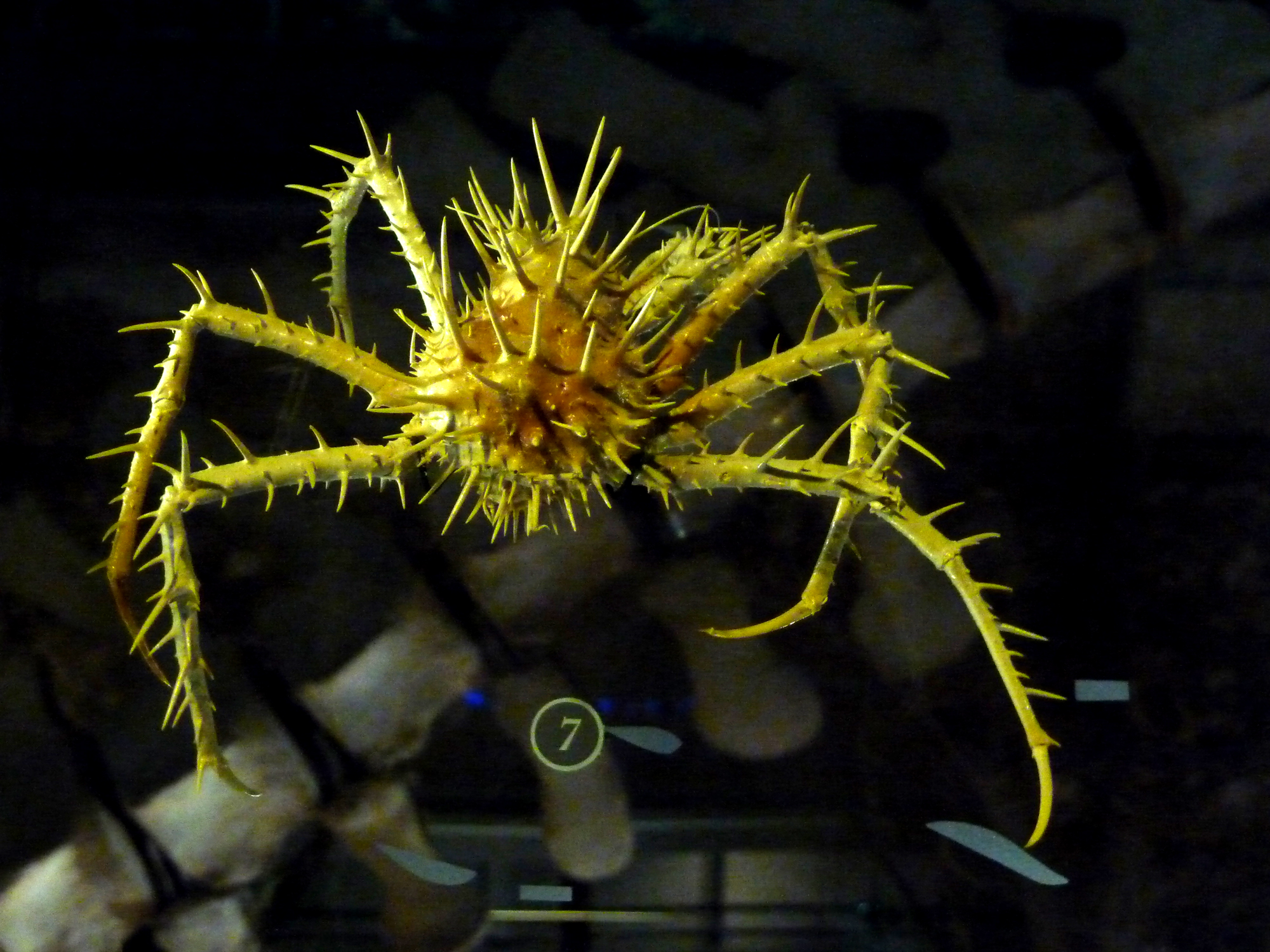
- Illustration from Ray Lankester's A Treatise on Zoology above, museum specimen below (living are red)

Scientific classification
- Kingdom: Animalia
- Phylum: Arthropoda
- Class: Malacostraca
- Order: Decapoda
- Suborder: Pleocyemata
- Infraorder: Anomura
- Family: Lithodidae
- Genus: Neolithodes
- Species: N. grimaldii

Binomial name
- Neolithodes grimaldii (A. Milne-Edwards & Bouvier, 1894)

Synonyms
- Neolithodes goodei Benedict, 1895; Lithodes Grimaldii A. Milne-Edwards & Bouvier, 1894

= Neolithodes grimaldii =

Porcupine crab

Species of king crab

Neolithodes grimaldii, the porcupine crab, is a species of king crab. It is found in cold, deep waters in the North Atlantic, often caught as bycatch in fisheries for Greenland halibut (Reinhardtius hippoglossoides). As suggested by its common name, the carapace and legs are covered in long spines.

== Description ==
The porcupine crab is dark red in colour. It is covered in spines, which are long and robust in large adults and very long and thin in juveniles and medium-sized individuals. The rest of the surface is mostly smooth. Its prominent rostrum at the front consists of a long basal spine and two well-developed dorsal spines to either side. Its carapace length up to 18 cm (7.1 in) and can weigh as much as 2.28 kg (5.0 lb). In healthy adults, average carapace length is about 9.5 cm (3.7 in) in females and about 12 cm (4.7 in) in males; however, they are often parasitised by the sterilising barnacle Briarosaccus callosus (family Peltogastridae), which causes both sexes to grow up to be significantly smaller than healthy individuals. Its walking legs are long; the second pair is the longest, and its third walking legs are more than three times as long as the carapace.

== Distribution and habitat ==
The porcupine crab is found on muddy bottoms on the continental slope in the North Atlantic. In the western Atlantic, it ranges from eastern Canada and Greenland south as far as North Carolina in the United States. In the eastern Atlantic, it ranges from Iceland to Madeira, Portugal and Cape Verde, including the Porcupine Seabight and Rockall Trough off Ireland. It has been recorded at depths of 329–5,230 m (1,079–17,159 ft). Based on radio tagging, some individuals will stay in a region for months, but others may move quite long distances.

== Taxonomy ==
Neolithodes grimaldii was first described in 1894 by carcinologists Alphonse Milne-Edwards and Eugène Louis Bouvier while performing research for Albert I, Prince of Monaco of the House of Grimaldi. Initially calling it Lithodes Grimaldii, they differentiated the holotype – about 45 mm (1.8 in) long and taken from the island of Newfoundland – from the recently described Lithodes agassizii (Note: Now Neolithodes agassizii) by its more prominent spines. They subsequently placed it into its own genus, Neolithodes, on account of it sharing many features with Lithodes but differing in its abdomen, which they compared to the monotypic genus Dermaturus. The following year, carcinologist James Everard Benedict described Lithodes goodei from the East Coast of the United States, again comparing it to L. agassizii, but this was later shown to be a junior synonym of N. grimaldii.

N. grimaldii, along with N. capensis, N. diomedeae, N. vinogradovi, and N. yaldwyni, belongs to a subgroup of Neolithodes in which "the carapace and [walking] legs at most bear scattered, minute secondary spines or tubercles amongst the primary dorsal spines". N. grimaldii's relationship to other king crabs can be seen in the following cladogram:

Lithodidae cladogram

- Lithodidae
  - - - - Paralithodes brevipes
        - - - - Paralomis/Glyptolithodes
                - - Glyptolithodes cristatipes
                  - - Paralomis zealandica
                    - Paralomis granulosa
                - - Paralomis dofleini
                  - - - - Paralomis pacifica
                        - Paralomis birsteini
                      - - Paralomis cristata
                        - Paralomis formosa
                    - - - - Paralomis multispina
                          - Paralomis hirtella
                        - Paralomis spinosissima
                      - - Paralomis erinacea
                        - - - Paralomis africana
                            - Paralomis cristulata
                          - - Paralomis anamerae
                            - - Paralomis aculeata
                              - Paralomis elongata
              - Echidnocerus
                - Echidnocerus cibarius
                - Echidnocerus foraminatus
            - - - Neolithodes
                  - Neolithodes diomedeae
                  - - Neolithodes brodiei
                    - - Neolithodes grimaldii
                      - - Neolithodes duhameli
                        - Neolithodes asperrimus
                - Lithodes
                  - - - Lithodes nintokuae
                      - - - Lithodes turkayi
                          - Lithodes longispina
                        - Lithodes murrayi
                    - Lithodes aequispinus
                  - - Lithodes couesi
                    - Lithodes turritus
                    - Lithodes paulayi
                    - Lithodes ferox
                  - - Lithodes maja
                    - - Lithodes santolla
                      - Lithodes confundens
              - Paralithodes platypus
            - Paralithodes camtschaticus
          - Phyllolithodes/Rhinolithodes
            - Phyllolithodes papillosus
            - Rhinolithodes wosnessenskii
        - Acantholithodes hispidus
        - Placetron wosnessenskii
      - Cryptolithodes
        - Cryptolithodes sitchensis
        - Cryptolithodes typicus
    - Hapalogaster
      - - Hapalogaster mertensii
        - Hapalogaster grebnitzkii
      - Hapalogaster dentata
  - Oedignathus inermis

== Fisheries ==
The porcupine crab is frequently caught as bycatch for Greenland halibut (Reinhardtius hippoglossoides). In 1996, approximately 767 tonnes (845 short tons; 1,691,000 lb) were caught and discarded in Canadian waters alone. Their survival rate is about 75% if they are not injured while being captured and released from the bottom gillnet; this decreases to about 30% when injured from rough handling.

Attempts have been made by fisheries since the 1990s to target the porcupine crab, which has been successfully processed and marketed in test studies. However, low catch rates when using baited pots – considered the only viable option – have hindered these attempts. Additionally, attempts to sell porcupine crabs caught as bycatch have failed due to the "extremely time consuming" process of removing them from the gillnet. Due to the porcupine crab population's high biomass, evidenced by the amount of bycatch, researchers believe that a fishery can still develop around the porcupine crab if its behavior is better-understood.
