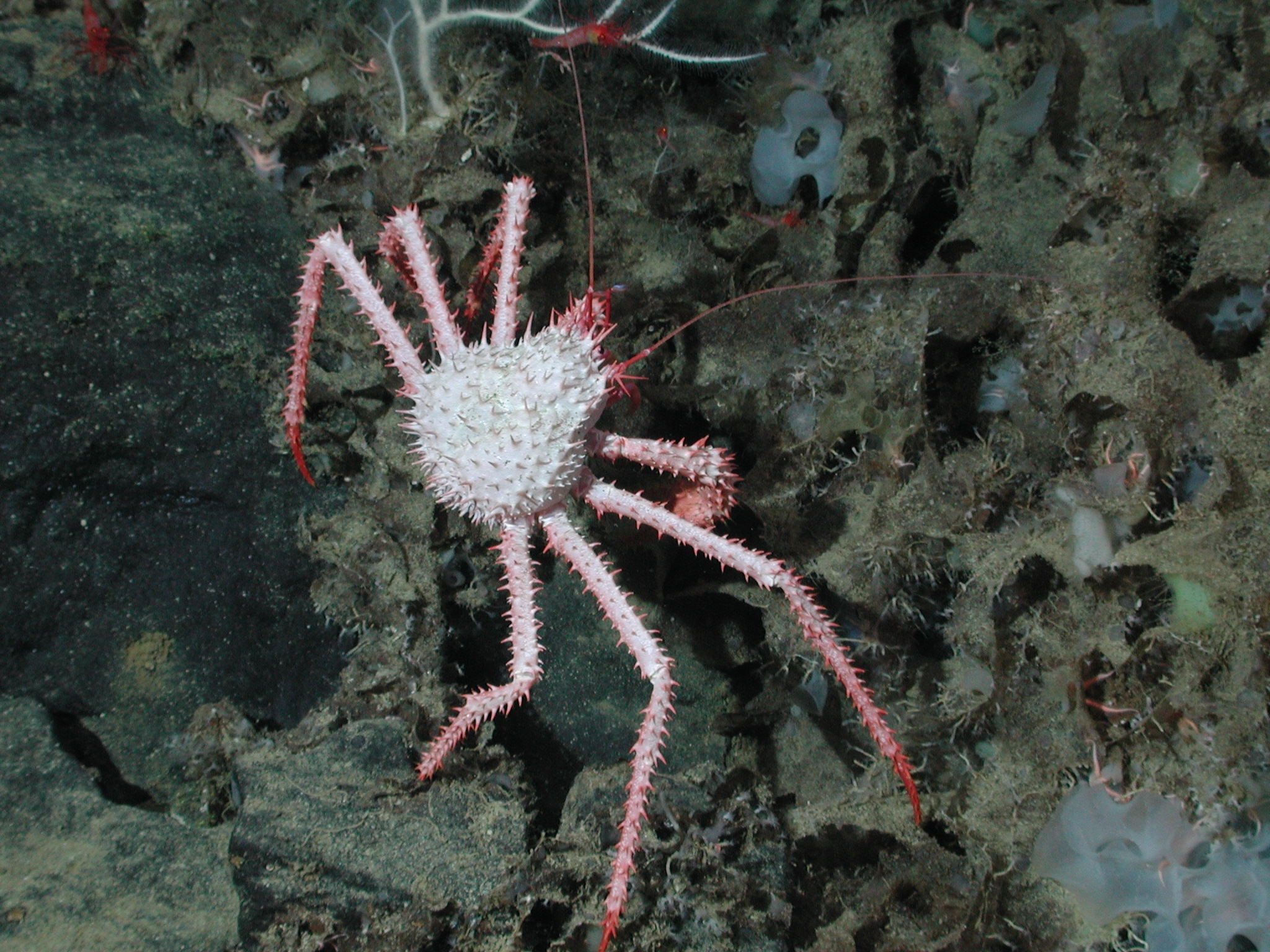
- Neolithodes crab at the Davidson Seamount off California

Scientific classification
- Kingdom: Animalia
- Phylum: Arthropoda
- Clade: Pancrustacea
- Class: Malacostraca
- Order: Decapoda
- Suborder: Pleocyemata
- Infraorder: Anomura
- Family: Lithodidae
- Subfamily: Lithodinae
- Genus: Neolithodes; A. Milne-Edwards & Bouvier, 1894

Type species
- Neolithodes grimaldii (A. Milne-Edwards & Bouvier, 1894)

= Neolithodes =

Genus of king crab

Neolithodes is a genus of king crabs in the subfamily Lithodinae.

== Description ==
Neolithodes has a pyriform carapace which does not cover the bases of its walking legs. Of its three pairs of walking legs, the rearmost are the longest, and all of them have a similar form. At the very front center of the carapace, its rostrum consists of a median spine and a pair of upward-slanted (dorsal) spines. Behind the rostrum sits the elevated gastric region, followed by a deep groove separating it from the triangular cardiac region. The cervical groove behind that is shallow and indistinct. When measuring the carapace's length without including the rostrum, (Note: Known as "postorbital carapace length" (pcl)) the carapace is always shorter than the walking legs.

Its second abdominal segment consists of five plates: a median plate and paired submedian and marginal (outer) plates. As in all king crabs, males have a symmetrical abdomen, but females' abdomens are skewed – enlarged on the left side and reduced on the right. In males, the third through fifth abdominal segments are composed of spine-like nodules, while in females, these are composed of well-developed plates on the left and well-developed plates or simply spine-like nodules on the right. In front of the abdomen is a deep, longitudinal sternal fissure between the frontmost pair of walking legs; this fissure is also present in Lithodes and readily distinguishes the two genera from other king crabs.

== Distribution ==
Although there are records from water as shallow as 70 m (230 ft) in cold regions, most records are much deeper, typically 700–2,000 m (2,300–6,600 ft). Neolithodes grimaldii has been reported to a depth of 5,238 m (17,185 ft).

== Ecology ==
Various sessile organisms such as barnacles are sometimes attached to their carapace and legs, and small commensal amphipods may live in their carapace. They are occasionally the victims of parasitic snailfish of the genus Careproctus, which lay their egg mass in the gill chamber of the crab, forming a mobile "home" until they hatch. Conversely, some juvenile Neolithodes have a commensal relationship with Scotoplanes sea cucumbers. To protect itself from large predators, the young king crab hides under the sea cucumber.

== Taxonomy ==
Neolithodes was described in 1894 by carcinologists Alphonse Milne-Edwards and Eugène Louis Bouvier. They initially placed the new species they found, Neolithodes grimaldii, in the closely related genus Lithodes, but they shortly thereafter constructed the genus Neolithodes based on the new species' distinctive abdomen, which they compared to the monotypic genus Dermaturus. The word Neolithodes derives from the Greek neo, meaning "new", and Lithodes. The name of the latter genus originates from the Latin lithodes, meaning "stone-like". No known Neolithodes fossils exist. Neolithodes' relationship to other king crabs can be seen in the following cladogram:

Lithodidae cladogram

- Lithodidae
  - - - - Paralithodes brevipes
        - - - - Paralomis/Glyptolithodes
                - - Glyptolithodes cristatipes
                  - - Paralomis zealandica
                    - Paralomis granulosa
                - - Paralomis dofleini
                  - - - - Paralomis pacifica
                        - Paralomis birsteini
                      - - Paralomis cristata
                        - Paralomis formosa
                    - - - - Paralomis multispina
                          - Paralomis hirtella
                        - Paralomis spinosissima
                      - - Paralomis erinacea
                        - - - Paralomis africana
                            - Paralomis cristulata
                          - - Paralomis anamerae
                            - - Paralomis aculeata
                              - Paralomis elongata
              - Echidnocerus
                - Echidnocerus cibarius
                - Echidnocerus foraminatus
            - - - Neolithodes
                  - Neolithodes diomedeae
                  - - Neolithodes brodiei
                    - - Neolithodes grimaldii
                      - - Neolithodes duhameli
                        - Neolithodes asperrimus
                - Lithodes
                  - - - Lithodes nintokuae
                      - - - Lithodes turkayi
                          - Lithodes longispina
                        - Lithodes murrayi
                    - Lithodes aequispinus
                  - - Lithodes couesi
                    - Lithodes turritus
                    - Lithodes paulayi
                    - Lithodes ferox
                  - - Lithodes maja
                    - - Lithodes santolla
                      - Lithodes confundens
              - Paralithodes platypus
            - Paralithodes camtschaticus
          - Phyllolithodes/Rhinolithodes
            - Phyllolithodes papillosus
            - Rhinolithodes wosnessenskii
        - Acantholithodes hispidus
        - Placetron wosnessenskii
      - Cryptolithodes
        - Cryptolithodes sitchensis
        - Cryptolithodes typicus
    - Hapalogaster
      - - Hapalogaster mertensii
        - Hapalogaster grebnitzkii
      - Hapalogaster dentata
  - Oedignathus inermis

== Species ==
Neolithodes contains the following species:

Image	Scientific name	Common name	Distribution	References
	Neolithodes agassizii (Smith, 1882)		Western Atlantic	
	Neolithodes asperrimus Barnard, 1947	Rough stone crab	South Africa to Mauritania	
	Neolithodes brodiei Dawson & Yaldwyn, 1970	Brodie's king crab	New Zealand and adjacent waters	
	Neolithodes bronwynae Ahyong, 2010	Rock crab	Bay of Plenty, Lord Howe Rise, eastern Australia, possibly New Caledonia, Hawaiian–Emperor seamount chain	
	Neolithodes capensis Stebbing, 1905	Cape stone crab	Southern Ocean, Indian Ocean, Bellingshausen Sea	
	Neolithodes diomedeae (Benedict, 1895)		Eastern Pacific, Southwestern Atlantic, Southern Ocean	
	Neolithodes duhameli Macpherson, 2004		Crozet Islands	
	Neolithodes flindersi Ahyong, 2010		Southeastern Australia	
	Neolithodes grimaldii (Milne-Edwards & Bouvier, 1894)	Porcupine crab	North Atlantic	
	Neolithodes indicus Padate, Cubelio & Takeda, 2020		Southeastern Arabian Sea	
	Neolithodes nipponensis Sakai, 1971	Japanese spiny crab	Japan and Taiwan	
	Neolithodes vinogradovi Macpherson, 1988		Arabian Sea to the Coral Sea	
	Neolithodes yaldwyni Ahyong & Dawson, 2006		Ross Sea	
