= Alaskan king crab fishing =

Commercial harvest of Alaskan king crab

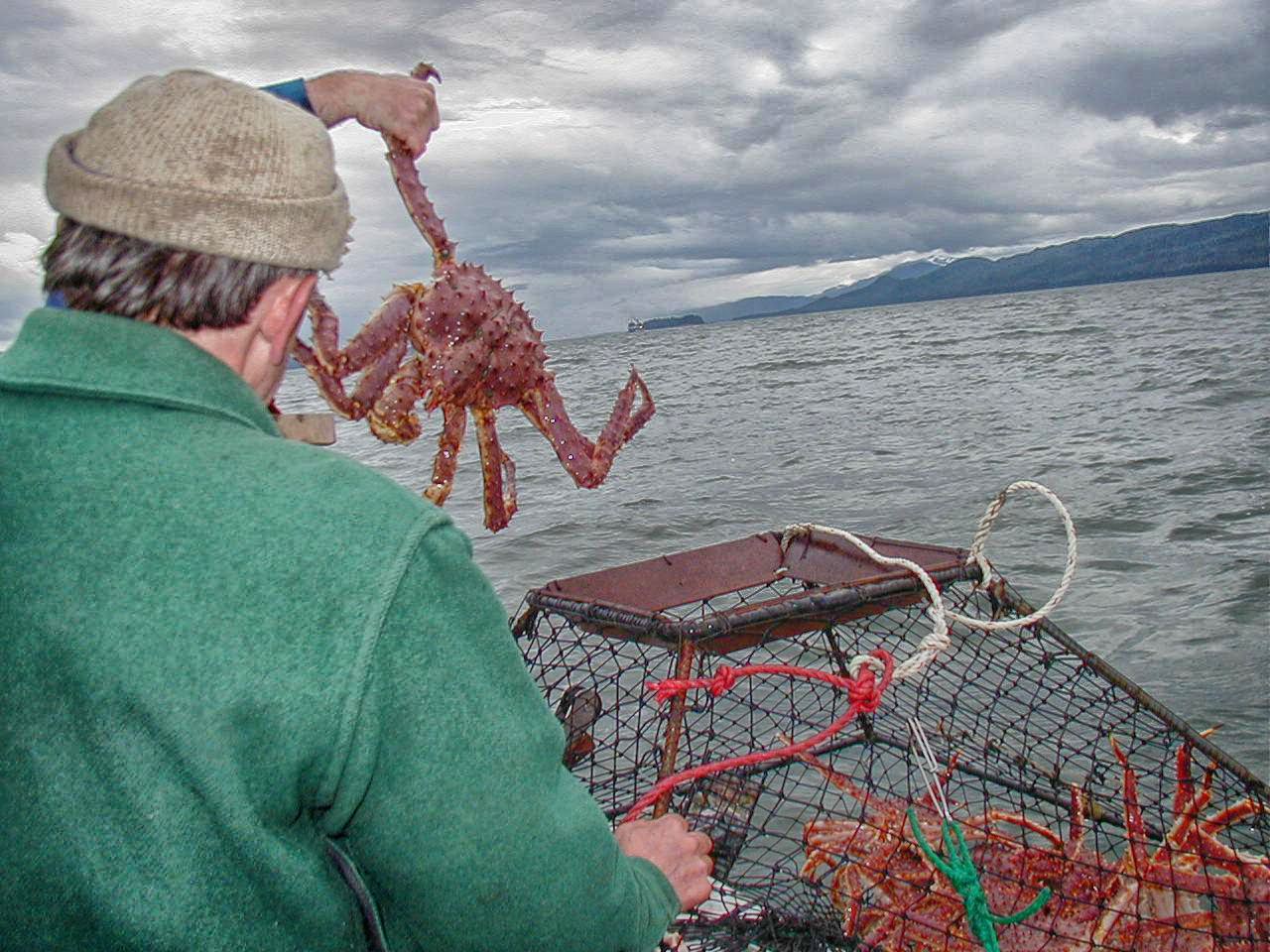
King crab catch in southeast Alaska

Alaskan king crab fishing is carried out during the fall in the waters off the coast of Alaska and the Aleutian Islands. The commercial catch is shipped worldwide. Large numbers of king crab are also caught in Russian and international waters.

In 1980, at the peak of the king crab industry, Alaskan fisheries produced up to 200,000,000 pounds (91,000,000 kg) of crab. However, by 1983, the total size of the catch had dropped by up to 90% in some places. Several theories for the precipitous drop in the crab population have been proposed, including overfishing, warmer waters, and increased fish predation. As a result, the current season is very short and in the 2010 season, only 24,000,000 pounds (11,000,000 kg) of red king crab were landed.

Alaskan crab fishing is very dangerous, and the fatality rate among the fishermen is about 80 times the fatality rate of the average worker. It is suggested that, on average, one crab fisherman dies weekly during the seasons.

== Types of commercially valuable king crab ==
In Alaska, three species of king crab are caught commercially: the red king crab (Paralithodes camtschaticus, found in Bristol Bay, Norton Sound, and the Kodiak Archipelago), blue king crab (Paralithodes platypus, St. Matthew Island and the Pribilof Islands), and golden king crab (Lithodes aequispinus, Aleutian Islands). The red king crab is the most prized of the three for its meat. A fourth variety, the scarlet king crab (Lithodes couesi), is too small and rare to be commercially viable, though some reports describe its meat as very sweet. Specific size requirements must be met; only certain types of king crab are legal at different times of the year and only males can be kept.

== Fishing season ==
The most popular crab-fishing time occurs between October and January. The allocated time for a season continued to shrink – at one point a red crab season was only four days long. After 2005, each boat was given a quota based on their catch from previous years and how many crabs are available to catch. The fleet went from 251 boats down to 89, and that number has since dropped, as many boat owners have found that leasing their quota is more profitable than spending money to ready a boat for fishing. Currently, the seasons last from two to four weeks.

== Rationalization: derby vs. quota ==
After the 2005 season, the Alaskan crab industry transitioned from a derby-style season to a quota system. This transition is known as rationalization. Under the old derby style, a large number of crews competed with each other to catch crab during a restrictive time window. Under the new individual fishing quota (IFQ) system, established owners have been given quotas, which they can fill at a more relaxed pace. In theory, it is intended to be safer, which was the main rationale for the change in the fishing rules. The transition to the quota system was also expected to increase the value of crab, by limiting the market of available crab. An influx of foreign crab negated some of these gains during the 2006 season.

The rationalization process put many crews out of work, as the owners of many small boats found their assigned quotas too small to meet operating expenses; during the first season run under the IFQ system, the fleet shrank from over 250 boats to around 89 mostly larger boats with high quotas.

== Equipment and process ==
Commercial fishing boats are between 12 and 75 m (39 and 246 ft) in length, are equipped with hydraulic systems to lift the catch, and are able to withstand the freezing weather of the Bering Sea. Each fishing boat sets its own sailing schedule during the crabbing season, often staying out for days or weeks at a time.

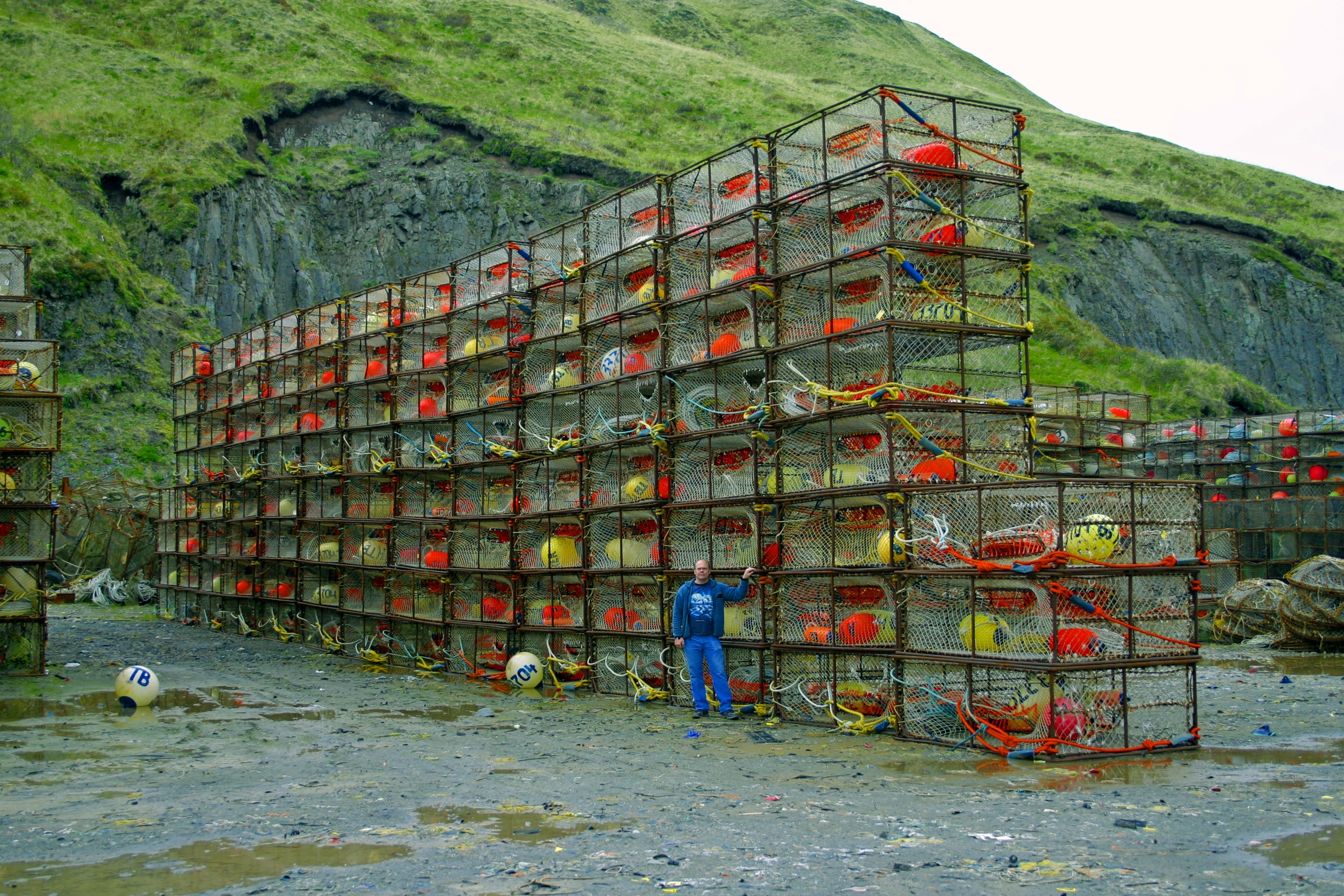
King crab pots stored for the crabbing season in Kodiak. The relative size of the pots can be compared to the man who is 6 feet (1.8 m) tall.

Fishermen use a box-shaped trap called a pot, which consists of a steel frame covered with a nylon mesh. Each pot weighs 600–800 lb (270–360 kg) and a ship may carry 150 to 300 pots. Fish, usually herring or codfish, are placed inside as bait, and then the pot is sunk to the sea floor where the king crabs reside. The pots are dropped in a straight line (known as a "string") for easier retrieval.

Red and blue king crab can be found between the intertidal zone and a depth of 100 fathoms (600 ft; 180 m). Golden king crab live in depths between 100 and 400 fathoms (180–720 m, 600–2400 ft). The location of the pot is marked on the surface by a buoy, which is later used for retrieval. After allowing the pots to rest on the sea floor (typically one to two days for red and blue king crab, longer for golden king crab), the pots are hauled back to the surface using a hydraulic winch with a pulley on the end called a "block".

The pot is then brought on board the boat and the crew sorts the catch. Any crabs not meeting the regulation requirements for size and sex are thrown back. The crabs are stored live in a holding tank until the boat reaches shore, where they are sold. If the weather becomes too cold, the live crabs may freeze and burst. If they are left in the tank for too long, they can harm and possibly kill each other as they can be cannibalistic.

Even the rocking of the boat can cause damage to the crabs, so boards are inserted in the holds to prevent excessive side-to-side movement. If a crab dies in the hold for any reason, it releases toxins that can kill other crabs. If the crew fails to remove the dead crabs, they can poison the entire tank and ruin the catch.

Deckhands are paid a percentage of the profits after the owner's share is taken into account. This can range from nothing to tens of thousands of dollars, depending on the size of the harvest. The so-called "greenhorns" (deckhands in their first season of fishing) are paid a fixed sum of money.

== Danger ==
Statistically, Alaskan crab fishing remains the most dangerous job in the United States. In 2006, the Bureau of Labor Statistics ranked commercial fishing as the occupation with the highest fatality rate, with 141.7 per 100,000 per year, almost 75% higher than the rate for pilots, flight engineers, and loggers, the next-most hazardous occupations. Alaskan crab fishing, though, is specifically even more dangerous, with over 300 fatalities per 100,000 per year. Over 80% of these deaths are caused by drowning or hypothermia. The fishermen are also susceptible to crippling injuries caused by working with heavy machinery and gear.

== Population decline ==
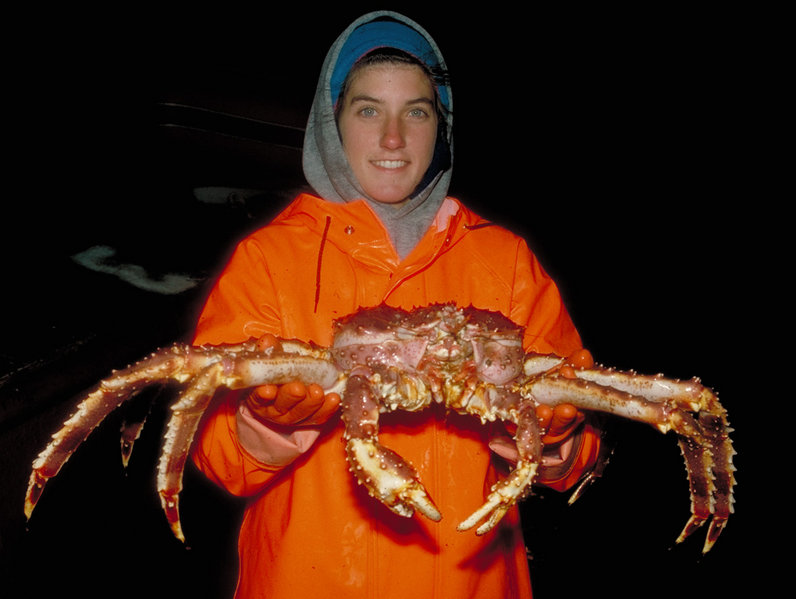
An NMFS Alaskan fisheries observer holding a red king crab (Paralithodes camtschaticus)

In 1980, at the peak of the king crab industry, Alaskan fisheries produced 200 million lb of crab, but by 1983, the total size of the catch had dropped to less than 10% of this size. Several theories for the precipitous drop in the crab population have been proposed, including overfishing, warmer waters, and increased fish predation. The slow harvest forced many fishermen to diversify and catch snow crab (such as opilio and tanner crab) or cod. Since then, strict regulations have been enforced to responsibly manage the populations and allow them to rebound. The red and blue king crab populations have stayed relatively low in almost all areas except Southeast Alaska since 1983, forcing many fishermen to concentrate on the golden king crab.

== Foreign fisheries ==
King crabs caught outside the United States are currently on the list of seafood that sustainability-minded consumers should avoid; the Monterey Bay Aquarium's Seafood Watch program lists king crab caught in the United States as a "good alternative".

The influx of crab from Russian fisheries has also created economic problems for U.S. crabbers. The amount of crab imported from Russia has increased from around 21 million pounds (9.5 million kg) in 2004 to 37.5 million pounds (17 million kg) in 2005 to more than 56 million pounds (25.45 million kg) in 2007. Much of this foreign crab is reportedly caught and imported illegally and has led to a steady decline in the price of crab from $3.55 per pound in 2003 to $3.21 in 2004, $2.74 in 2005 and $2.30 in 2007 for Aleutian golden king crab, and $5.15 per pound in 2003 to $4.70 in 2004 to $4.52 in 2005 and $4.24 in 2007 for Bristol Bay red king crab.

== In the media ==
Deadliest Catch is a reality series aired by the Discovery Channel beginning in 2005. The show highlights interpersonal relationships and the dangers of king crab fishing, including freezing temperatures, turbulent seas, and raising full pots that can weigh well over a ton. Since the season is short—both because of regulations and the weather—fishermen often spend days at a time in very rough seas working long hours with little sleep.
