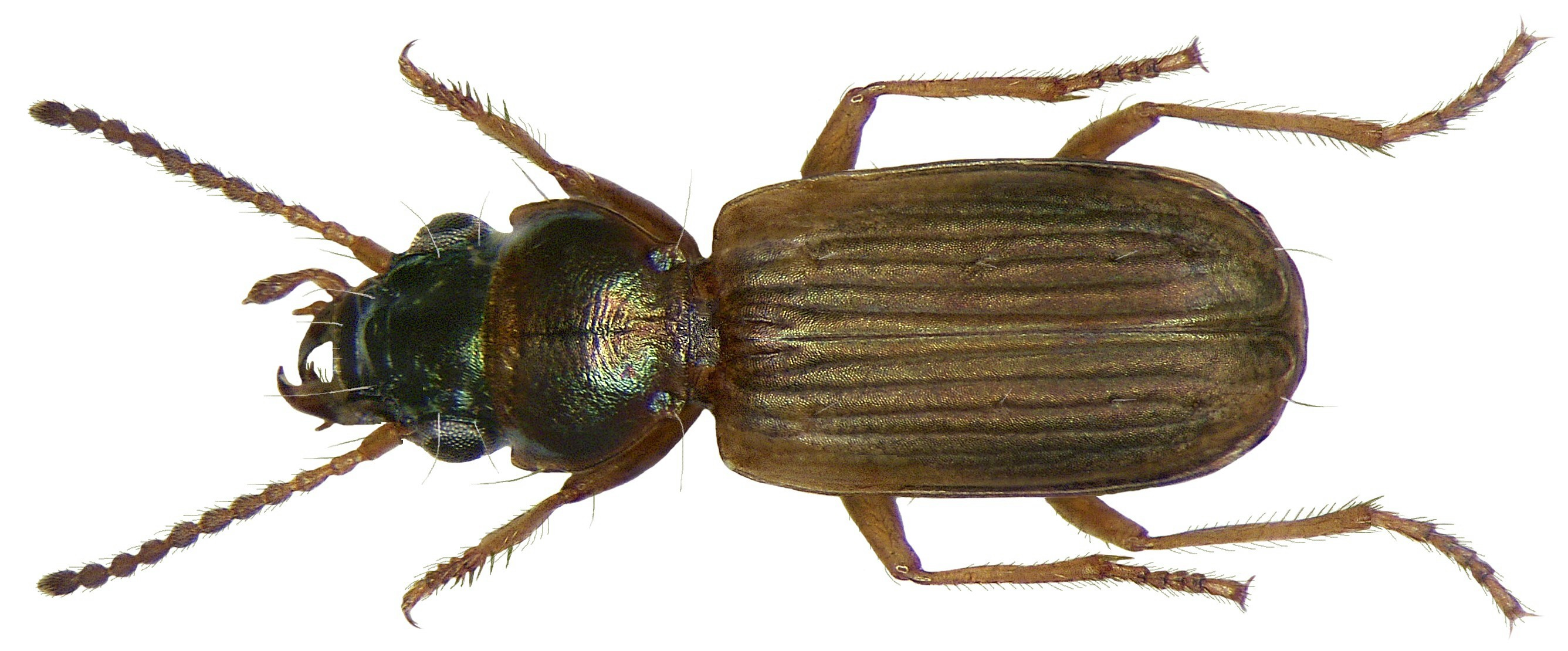

Scientific classification
- Kingdom: Animalia
- Phylum: Arthropoda
- Class: Insecta
- Order: Coleoptera
- Suborder: Adephaga
- Family: Carabidae
- Genus: Bembidion
- Species: B. laterale

Binomial name
- Bembidion laterale (Samouelle, 1819)

Synonyms
- Cillenus (Cillenus) lateralis Samouelle, 1819; Bembidion bedeli Nicolas, 1906; Cillenus bedeli (Nicolas, 1906); Bembidion laterale (Leach, 1819); Bembidion leachii Dejean, 1831; Bembidium leachii Dejean, 1831; Cillenus leachii (Dejean, 1831)

= Bembidion laterale =

Species of beetle

Bembidion laterale is a species of ground beetle native to Europe.
