= O. inermis =

O. inermis may refer to:

- Oedignathus inermis, the granular claw crab, a species of hapalogastrid king crab
- Ophiodermella inermis, a species of sea snail in the family Borsoniidae
