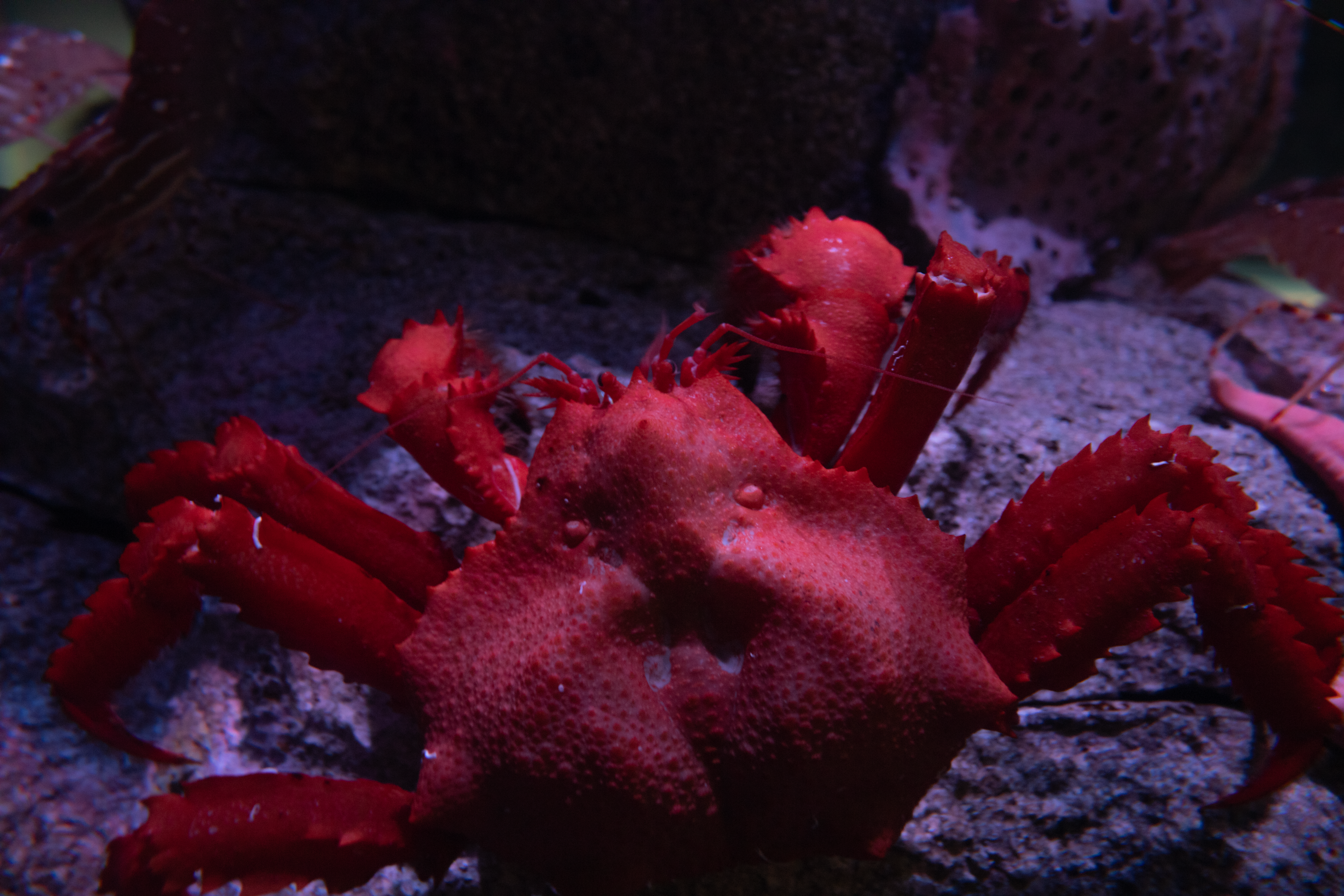

Scientific classification
- Domain: Eukaryota
- Kingdom: Animalia
- Phylum: Arthropoda
- Class: Malacostraca
- Order: Decapoda
- Suborder: Pleocyemata
- Infraorder: Anomura
- Family: Lithodidae
- Genus: Glyptolithodes; Faxon, 1895
- Species: G. cristatipes

Binomial name
- Glyptolithodes cristatipes (Faxon, 1893)

Synonyms
- Rhinolithodes cristatipes Faxon, 1893

= Glyptolithodes =

Monospecific genus of king crab

Glyptolithodes cristatipes, also known as the Peruvian centolla, is a species of king crab, and the only species in the genus Glyptolithodes. The species was briefly placed in the related genus Rhinolithodes after its initial description, but was soon moved to its own genus.

== Description ==
This species shows notable sexual dimorphism, with the males having a right cheliped which is larger than the left.

== Distribution ==
Glyptolithodes cristatipes is found off the Pacific coasts of South America, especially Chile and Peru, and extending as far northwards as Southern California, and as far south as 33° 35' S.
