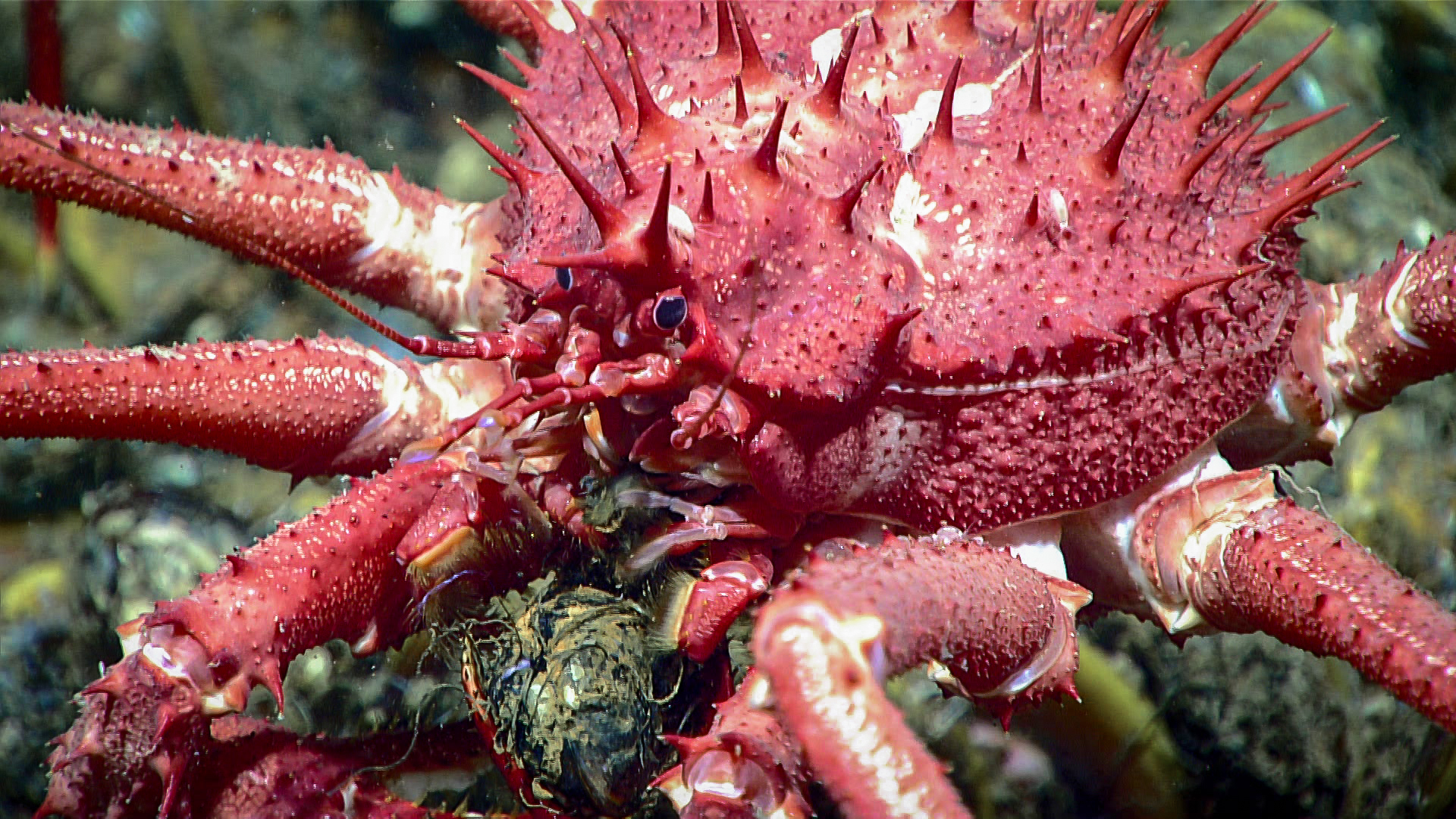
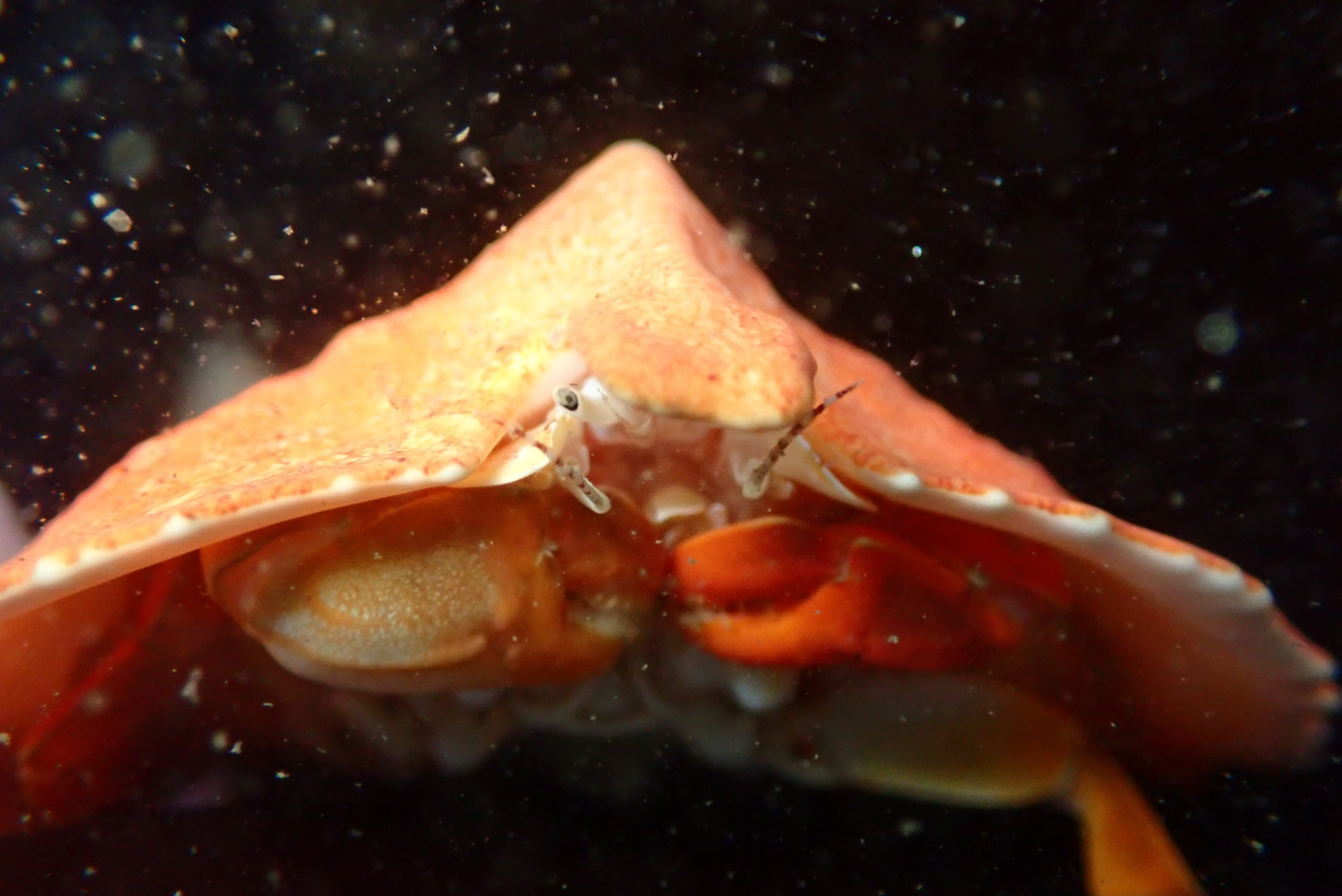
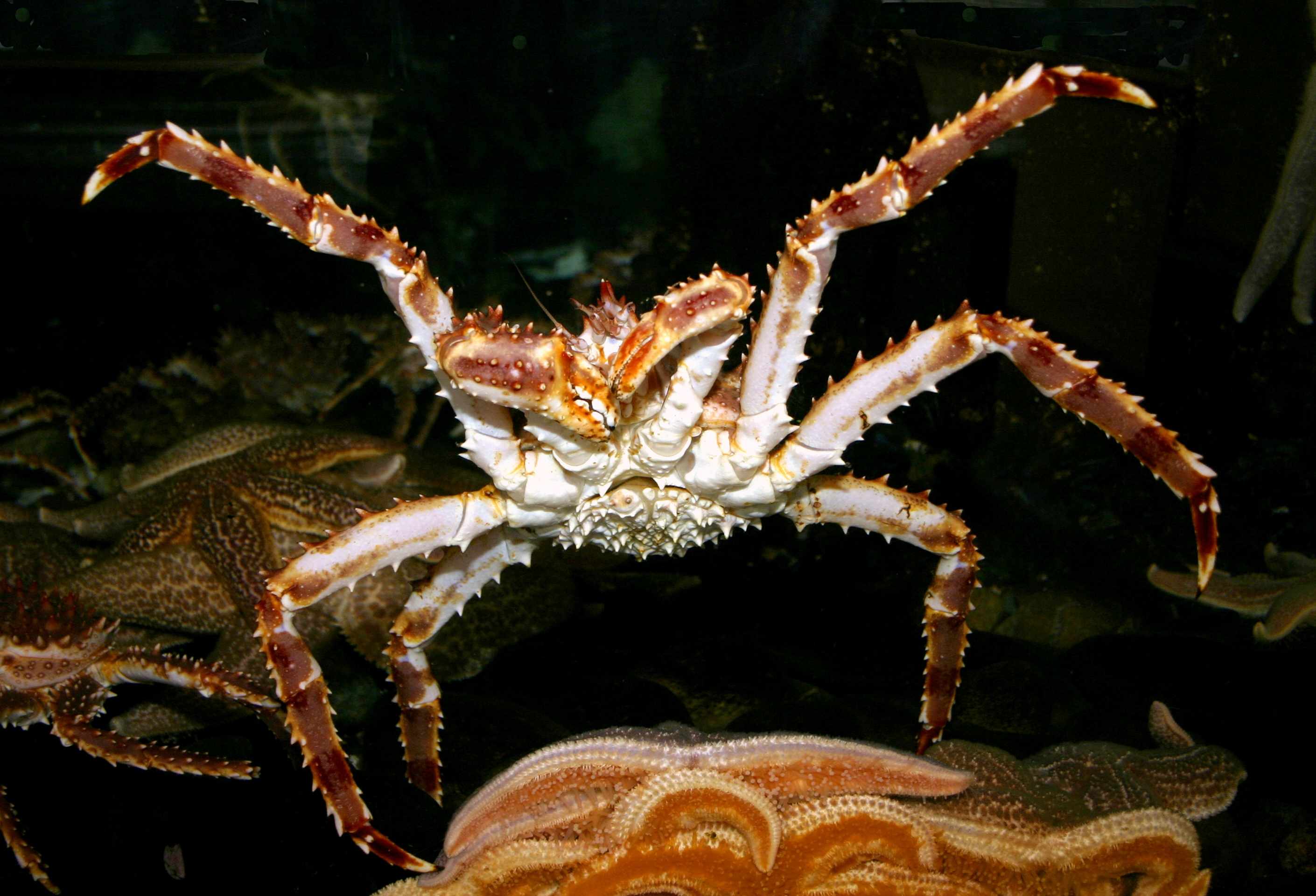
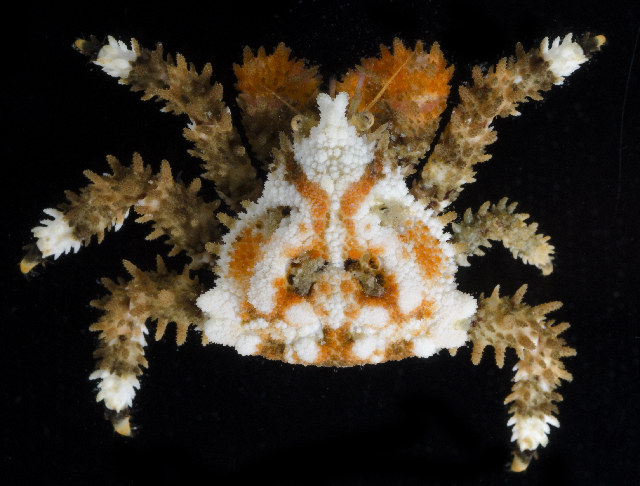
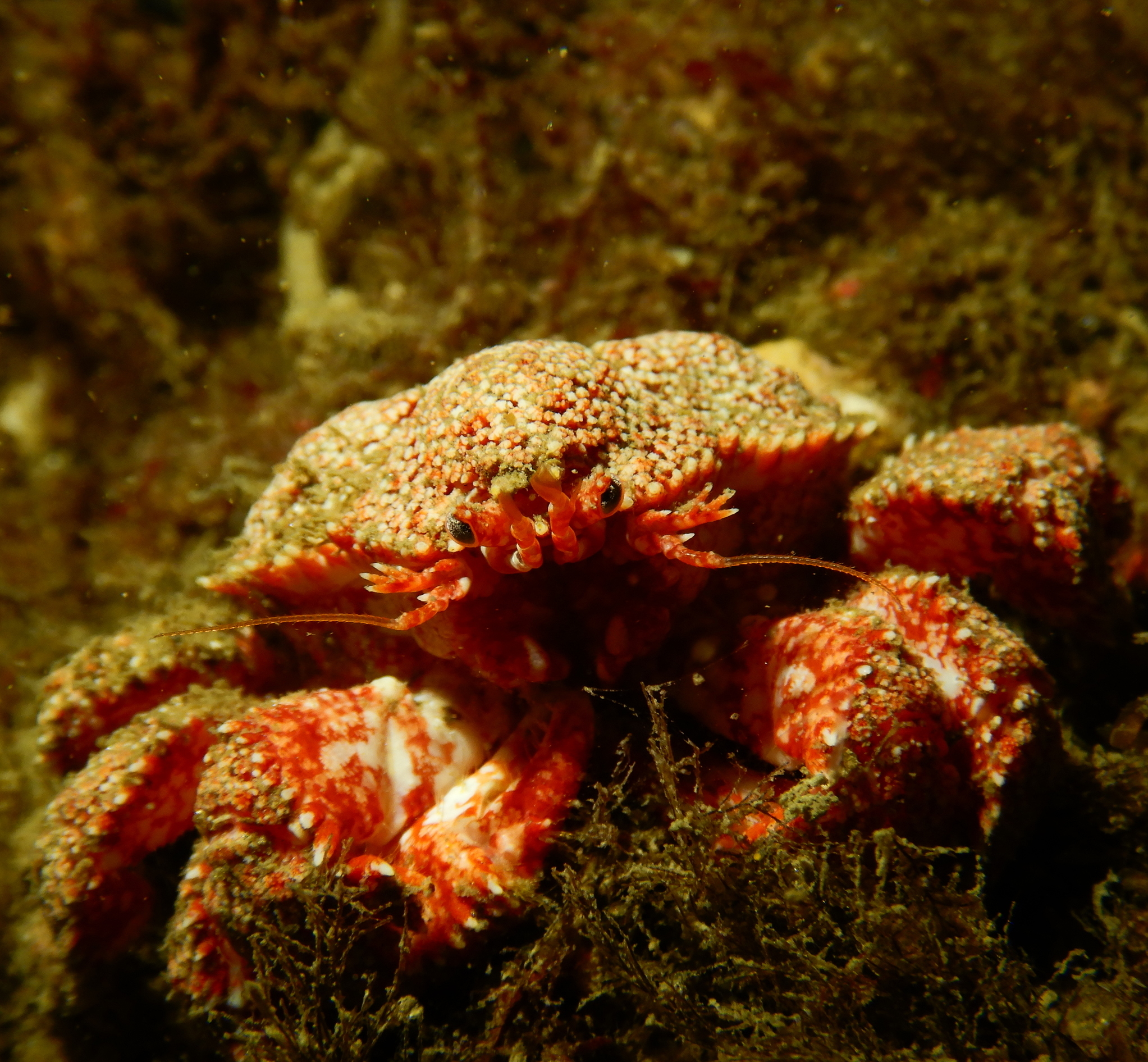
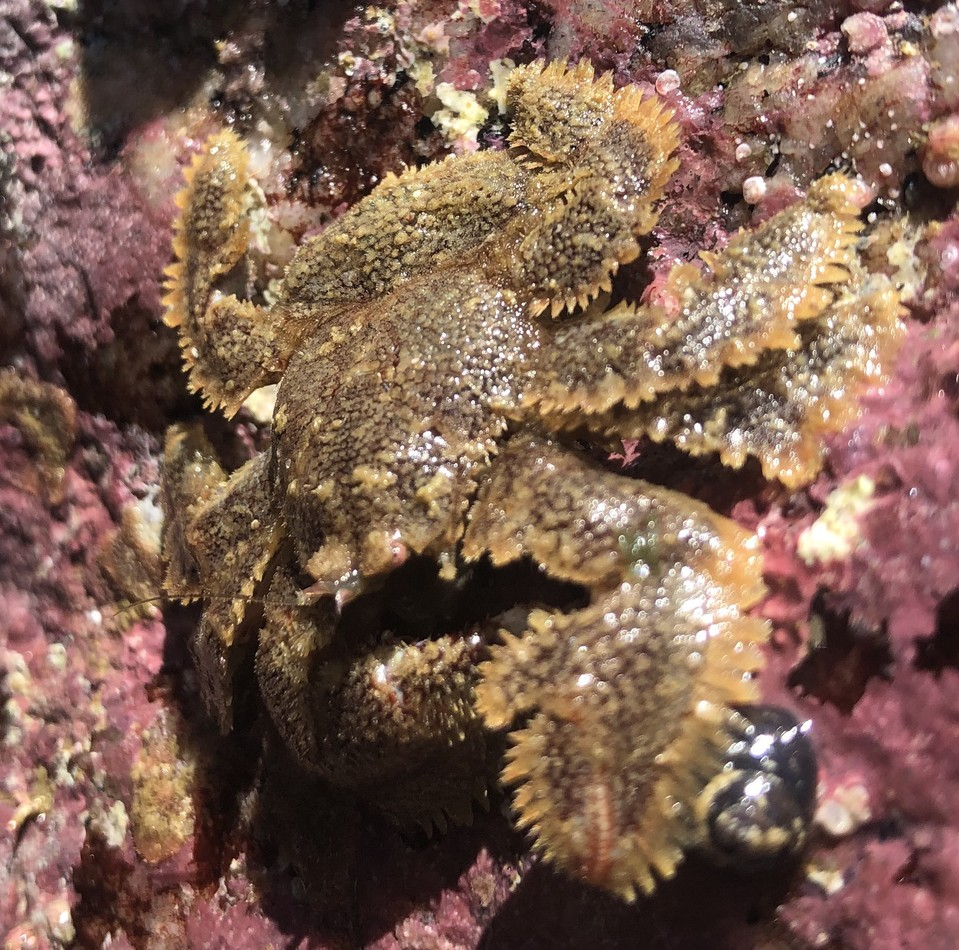
- Neolithodes agassizii Cryptolithodes sitchensis Paralithodes camtschaticus Phyllolithodes papillosus Paralomis granulosa Hapalogaster cavicauda

Scientific classification
- Kingdom: Animalia
- Phylum: Arthropoda
- Clade: Pancrustacea
- Class: Malacostraca
- Order: Decapoda
- Suborder: Pleocyemata
- Infraorder: Anomura
- Superfamily: Paguroidea
- Family: Lithodidae; Samouelle, 1819

Genera
- Hapalogastrinae Brandt, 1850: Acantholithodes Holmes, 1895; Dermaturus Brandt, 1850; Hapalogaster Brandt, 1850; Oedignathus Benedict, 1895; Placetron Schalfeew, 1892; Lithodinae Samouelle, 1819: Cryptolithodes Brandt, 1848; Echidnocerus White, 1842 (Note: Known as Lopholithodes Brandt, 1848 until 2022 after the senior synonym Echidnocerus was rediscovered.); Glyptolithodes Faxon, 1895; Lithodes Latreille, 1806; Neolithodes A. Milne-Edwards & Bouvier, 1894; Paralithodes Brandt, 1848; Paralomis White, 1856; Phyllolithodes Brandt, 1848; Rhinolithodes Brandt, 1848; Sculptolithodes Makarov, 1934

= King crab =

King crabs Temporal range: Early Miocene – Recent

Family of anomuran crustaceans

King crabs or stone crabs are marine decapod crustaceans of the family Lithodidae (Note: Collectively referred to as "lithodids".) that are found chiefly in deep waters and are adapted to cold environments. They are composed of two subfamilies: Lithodinae, which tend to inhabit deep waters, are globally distributed, and comprise the majority of the family's species diversity; and Hapalogastrinae, which are endemic to the North Pacific and inhabit exclusively shallow waters. King crabs superficially resemble true crabs but are generally understood to be closest to the pagurid hermit crabs. This placement of king crabs among the hermit crabs is supported by several anatomical peculiarities which are present only in king crabs and hermit crabs, making them a prominent example of carcinisation among decapods. Several species of king crabs, especially in Alaskan and southern South American waters, are targeted by commercial fisheries and have been subject to overfishing.

== Taxonomy ==
King crabs are believed to have originated during the Early Miocene in shallow North Pacific waters, where most genera – including all Hapalogastrinae – are distributed and where they exhibit a high amount of morphological diversity. Since the late 1800s, carcinologists have suspected that king crabs are hermit crabs who underwent secondary calcification and left their shell.

The king crab family Lithodidae was created and placed among the true crabs in 1819 by zoologist George Samouelle to hold the then-recently-described genus Lithodes. In 2007, examining the monophyly of the decapod infraorder Anomura, carcinologist Patsy McLaughlin and colleagues moved the king crabs from their classification within the hermit crab superfamily Paguroidea into a separate superfamily, Lithodoidea. They furthermore found Lithodoidea to be a sister clade to the mole crab superfamily Hippoidea. This was controversial, as there is strong phylogenetic evidence that king crabs are derived from hermit crabs and closely related to pagurid hermit crabs. In 2023, king crabs were folded back into Paguroidea, with Lithodoidea being considered superseded. The king crabs' relationship to other hermit crabs, as well as the family's internal phylogeny, can be seen in the following two cladograms:

- Brachyura ("true" crabs)
- Anomura
  - Galatheoidea
    - Porcellanidae (porcelain crabs)
    - - Munidopsidae (squat lobsters)
      - - Galatheidae (squat lobsters)
        - Munididae (squat lobsters)
  - - - - Pagurus longicarpus
        - - Lithodidae (king crabs)
          - Paguridae
      - - Pylochelidae (symmetrical hermit crabs)
        - - Lomisidae (hairy stone crabs)
          - - Aeglidae (pancoras)
            - Chirostyloidea
              - Kiwaidae (yeti crabs)
              - Sternostylidae
    - - Hippoidea
        - Blepharipodidae (mole crabs)
        - - Albuneidae (mole crabs)
          - Hippidae (mole crabs)
      - Paguroidea
        - Diogenidae (left-handed hermit crabs)
        - Coenobitidae (terrestrial hermit crabs)

Lithodidae cladogram

- Lithodidae
  - - - - Paralithodes brevipes
        - - - - Paralomis/Glyptolithodes
                - - Glyptolithodes cristatipes
                  - - Paralomis zealandica
                    - Paralomis granulosa
                - - Paralomis dofleini
                  - - - - Paralomis pacifica
                        - Paralomis birsteini
                      - - Paralomis cristata
                        - Paralomis formosa
                    - - - - Paralomis multispina
                          - Paralomis hirtella
                        - Paralomis spinosissima
                      - - Paralomis erinacea
                        - - - Paralomis africana
                            - Paralomis cristulata
                          - - Paralomis anamerae
                            - - Paralomis aculeata
                              - Paralomis elongata
              - Echidnocerus
                - Echidnocerus cibarius
                - Echidnocerus foraminatus
            - - - Neolithodes
                  - Neolithodes diomedeae
                  - - Neolithodes brodiei
                    - - Neolithodes grimaldii
                      - - Neolithodes duhameli
                        - Neolithodes asperrimus
                - Lithodes
                  - - - Lithodes nintokuae
                      - - - Lithodes turkayi
                          - Lithodes longispina
                        - Lithodes murrayi
                    - Lithodes aequispinus
                  - - Lithodes couesi
                    - Lithodes turritus
                    - Lithodes paulayi
                    - Lithodes ferox
                  - - Lithodes maja
                    - - Lithodes santolla
                      - Lithodes confundens
              - Paralithodes platypus
            - Paralithodes camtschaticus
          - Phyllolithodes/Rhinolithodes
            - Phyllolithodes papillosus
            - Rhinolithodes wosnessenskii
        - Acantholithodes hispidus
        - Placetron wosnessenskii
      - Cryptolithodes
        - Cryptolithodes sitchensis
        - Cryptolithodes typicus
    - Hapalogaster
      - - Hapalogaster mertensii
        - Hapalogaster grebnitzkii
      - Hapalogaster dentata
  - Oedignathus inermis

As of May 2025, there are 15 known genera of king crabs across two subfamilies. These include:

=== Hapalogastrinae ===
- Acantholithodes Holmes, 1895
- Dermaturus Brandt, 1850
- Hapalogaster Brandt, 1850
- Oedignathus Benedict, 1895
- Placetron Schalfeew, 1892

=== Lithodinae ===
- Cryptolithodes Brandt, 1848
- Echidnocerus White, 1842
- Glyptolithodes Faxon, 1895
- Lithodes Latreille, 1806
- Neolithodes A. Milne-Edwards & Bouvier, 1894
- Paralithodes Brandt, 1848
- Paralomis White, 1856
- Phyllolithodes Brandt, 1848
- Rhinolithodes Brandt, 1848
- Sculptolithodes Makarov, 1934

== Description ==
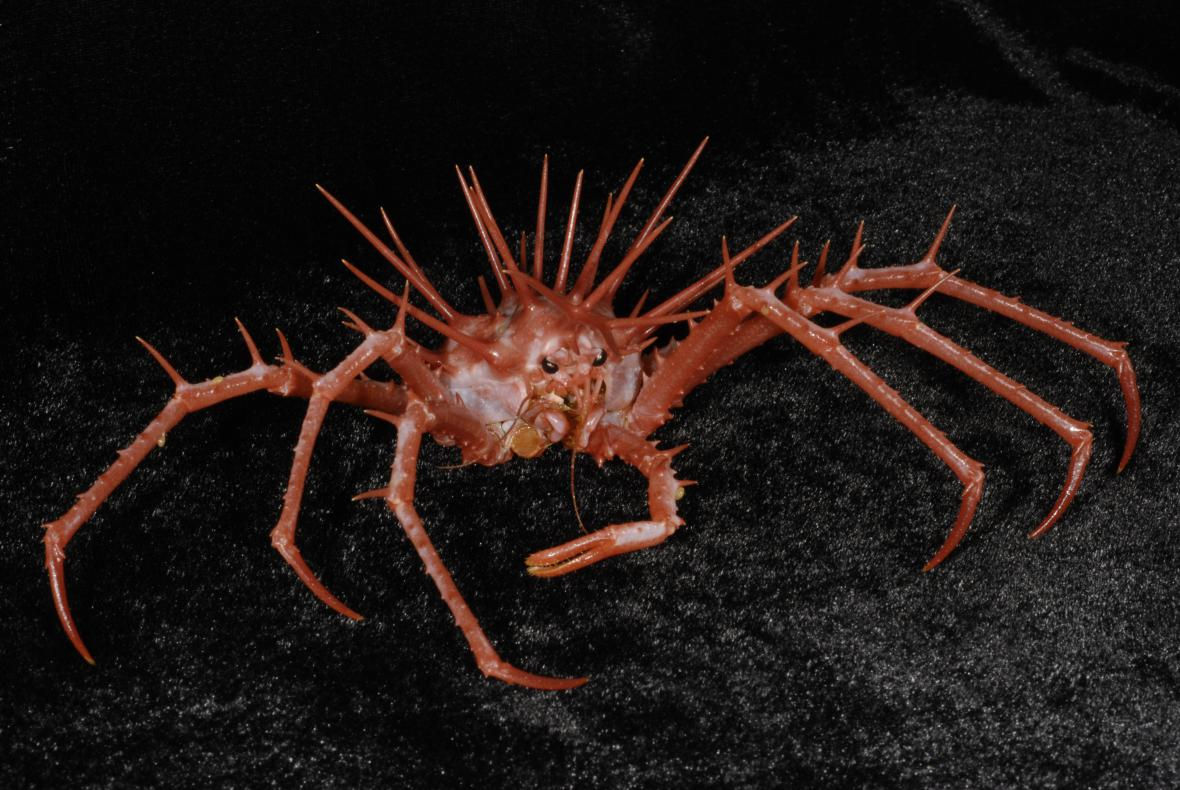
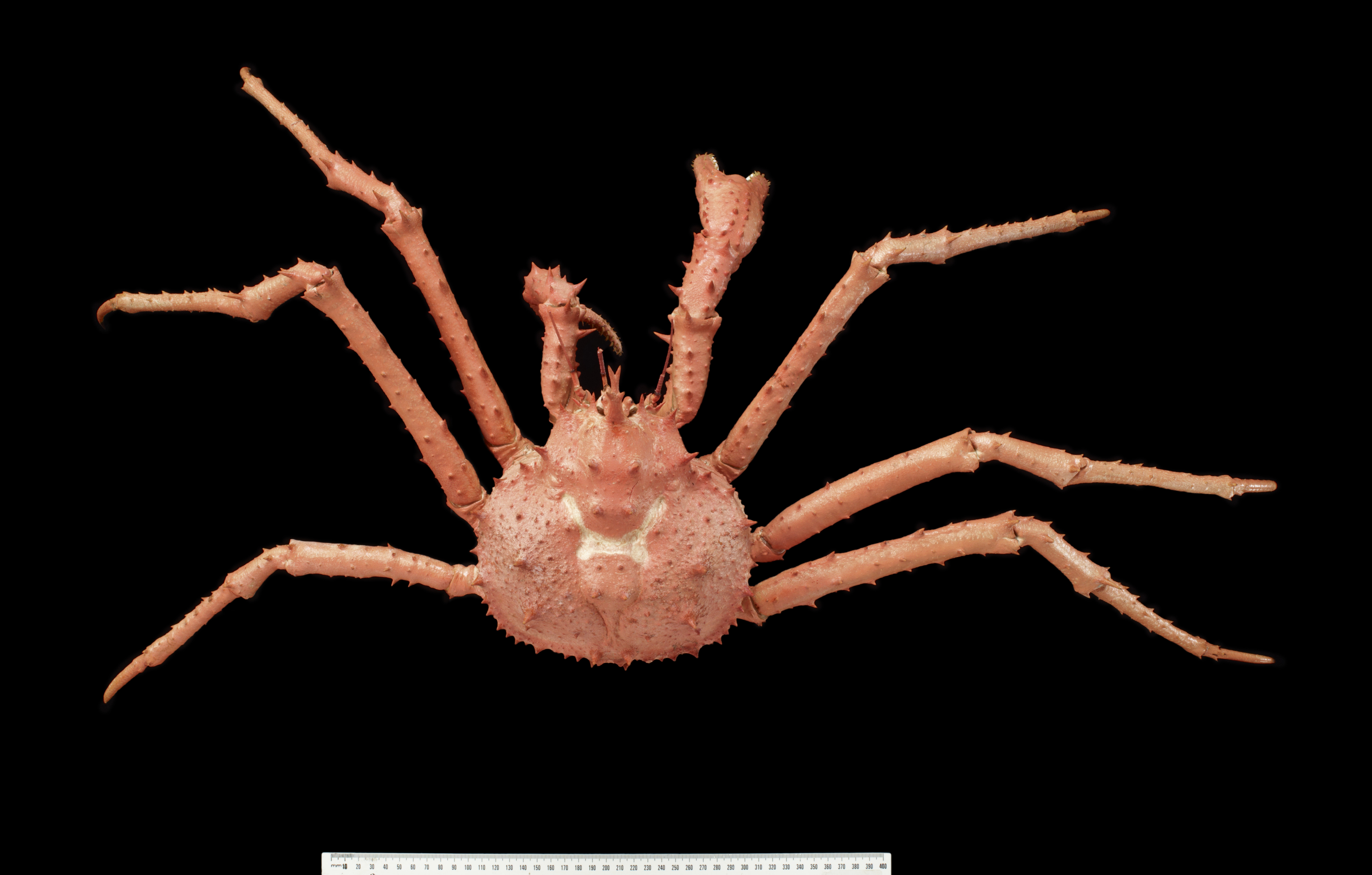
King crabs often feature prominent spines, which shrink as they mature. Pictured is a juvenile (left) and adult (right) specimen of Lithodes aotearoa.

King crabs are a morphologically diverse group, distinctive among hermit crabs for their superficial similarity to true crabs.

They have five pairs of legs, called pereopods: (Note: These legs are commonly labeled pereopod 1–5 starting from the anterior.) the first – frontmost – set are chelipeds whose right side is often larger and more robust than the left; the second, third, and fourth are walking legs tipped with sharp dactyli; and the fifth, used for cleaning, are very small and generally sit inside the branchial chamber. Starting from the carapace, the walking legs can be divided into a coxa, ischiobasis, merus, carpus, propodus, and finally dactylus; the chelipeds lack coxae and are instead composed of an ischiobasis, merus, carpus, and palm which then forks into a movable dactylus and an inflexible pollex.

On their underside, they have a short abdomen – composed of plates or nodules – which is asymmetrical in females. This abdomen (sometimes called a pleon) is folded against the underside of the cephalothorax and is composed of six segments – called somites or pleonites – and a telson. (Note: These segments are commonly labeled somite/pleonite 1–6 starting from the posterior.) In Hapalogastrinae, this abdomen is soft, while it is hard and calcified in members of Lithodinae. Lithodids lack any sort of uropod seen in some decapods.

== Distribution ==
King crabs are typically found in deep waters, especially in polar and subpolar regions and near hydrothermal vents and cold seeps. Members of Lithodinae can be found in all five of the world's oceans, namely the Pacific, Atlantic, Indian, Southern, and Arctic, while members of Hapalogastrinae are only found in the North Pacific. Members of Hapalogastrinae exhibit a tolerance for higher temperatures than Lithodinae; whereas Lithodinae tend to live exclusively in deep waters or – less commonly – high-latitude shallow waters, Hapalogastrinae are found only in shallow waters (<100 m (330 ft)). At the deepest, members of the Lithodinae genera Paralomis, Neolithodes, and Lithodes have been found at depths of 4,152 m (13,622 ft), 3,207 m (10,522 ft), and 1,821 m (5,974 ft), respectively.

== Fisheries ==
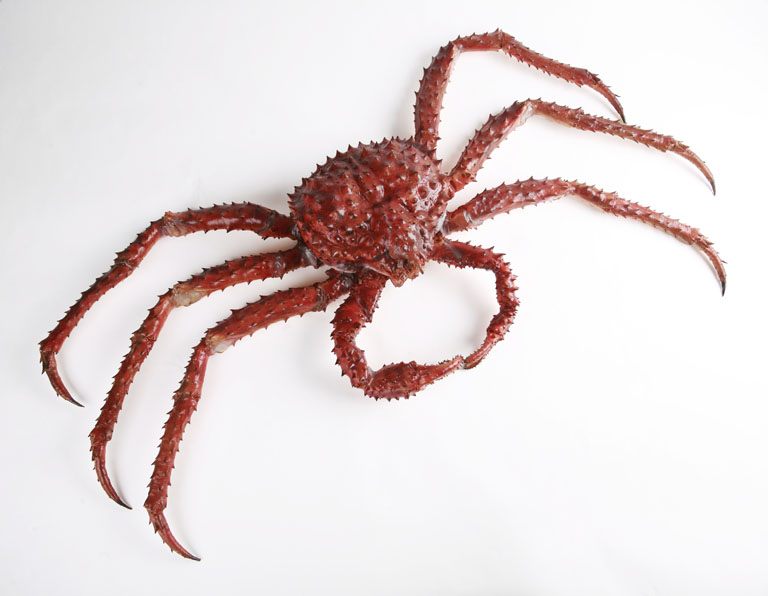
Red king crabs are widely fished in Alaska.

Because of their large size, the taste of their meat, and their status as a delicacy, some species of king crabs are caught and sold as food. Red (Paralithodes camtschaticus) and blue (Paralithodes platypus) king crabs are heavily targeted by commercial fisheries in Alaska and have been for several decades. However, populations have fluctuated in the past 25 years, and some areas are currently closed due to overfishing. Alaskan fisheries additionally target the golden king crab (Lithodes aequispinus). In South America, both the southern king crab (Lithodes santolla) and several species of Paralomis are targeted by commercial fisheries, and as a result, the population of L. santolla has seen a dramatic decline.

== Symbionts and parasites ==
Juveniles of species of king crabs, including Neolithodes diomedeae, use a species (Scotoplanes Sp. A) of sea cucumber (often known as "sea pigs") as hosts and can be found on top of and under Scotoplanes. The Scotoplanes reduce the risk of predation for the N. diomedeae, while the Scotoplanes are not harmed from being hosts, which supports the consensus that the two organisms have a commensal relationship. Endosymbiotic microorganisms of the order Eccrinida have been found in Paralithodes camtschaticus and Lithodes maja, living in their hindgut between molts.

Some species of king crab, including those of the genera Lithodes, Neolithodes, Paralithodes, and likely Echidnocerus, act as hosts to some parasitic species of careproctus fish. The careproctus lays eggs in the gill chamber of the king crab which serves as a well-protected and aerated area for the eggs to reside until they hatch. On occasion king crabs have been found to be host to the eggs of multiple species of careproctus simultaneously. King crabs are additionally parasitized by rhizocephalan genus Briarosaccus, a type of barnacle. The barnacle irreversibly sterilizes the crab, and over 50% of some king crab populations are affected.

== See also ==
- Alaskan king crab fishing
- Spider crab
- Snow crab

== Works cited ==
- Ahyong, Shane T.; Schnabel, Kareen (January 2009). "Anomuran phylogeny: New insights from molecular data". In Martin, Joel W.; Crandall, Keith A.; Felder, Darryl L. (eds.). Decapod Crustacean Phylogenetics. CRC Press. doi:10.13140/2.1.2705.5684. ISBN 978-1-4200-9258-5 – via ResearchGate.
- Ahyong, Shane T. (2010). The Marine Fauna of New Zealand: King Crabs of New Zealand, Australia, and the Ross Sea (Crustacea: Decapoda: Lithodidae) (PDF). NIWA Biodiversity Memoirs. Vol. 123. National Institute of Water and Atmospheric Research. pp. 5–15. ISBN 978-0-478-23285-1. LCCN 2010497356. Archived (PDF) from the original on 15 February 2020.
- McLaughlin, Patsy A.; Lemaitre, Rafael; Sorhannus, Ulf (January 2007). "Hermit crab phylogeny: A Reappraisal and its "fall-out"" (PDF). Journal of Crustacean Biology. 27 (1): 97–115. doi:10.1651/S-2675.1 – via the Natural History Museum of Los Angeles County.
- Poore, Gary C. B.; Ahyong, Shane T. (2023). "Anomura". Marine Decapod Crustacea: A Guide to Families and Genera of the World. CRC Press. pp. 311–317. ISBN 978-1-4863-1178-1.
- Samouelle, George (1819). The Entomologist's Useful Compendium. London: Thomas Boys – via WoRMS.
