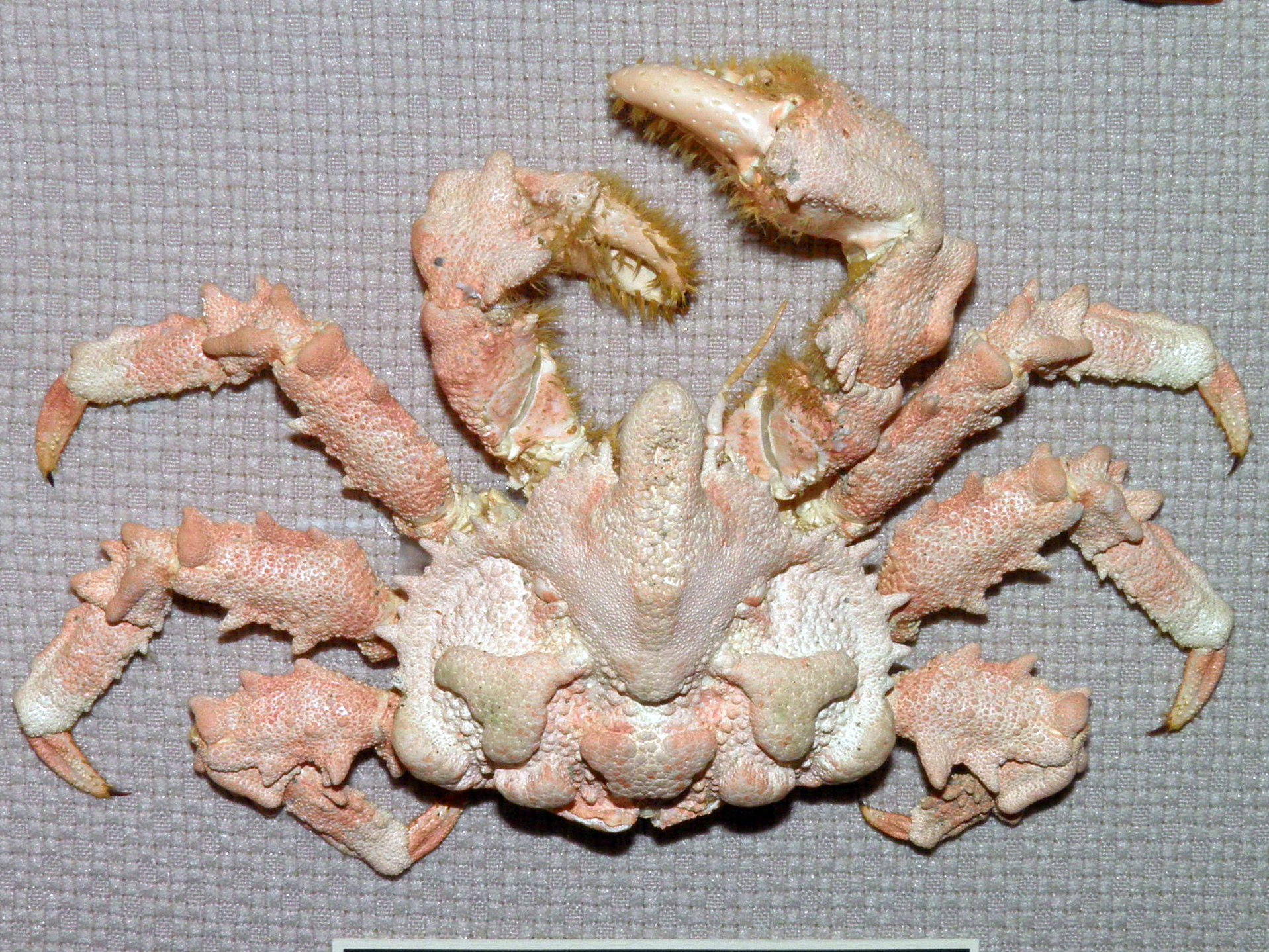

Scientific classification
- Domain: Eukaryota
- Kingdom: Animalia
- Phylum: Arthropoda
- Class: Malacostraca
- Order: Decapoda
- Suborder: Pleocyemata
- Infraorder: Anomura
- Family: Lithodidae
- Genus: Sculptolithodes; Makarov, 1934
- Species: S. derjugini

Binomial name
- Sculptolithodes derjugini Makarov, 1934

= Sculptolithodes =

Monospecific genus of king crab

Sculptolithodes is a monotypic genus of king crab. Its only species is Sculptolithodes derjugini.
