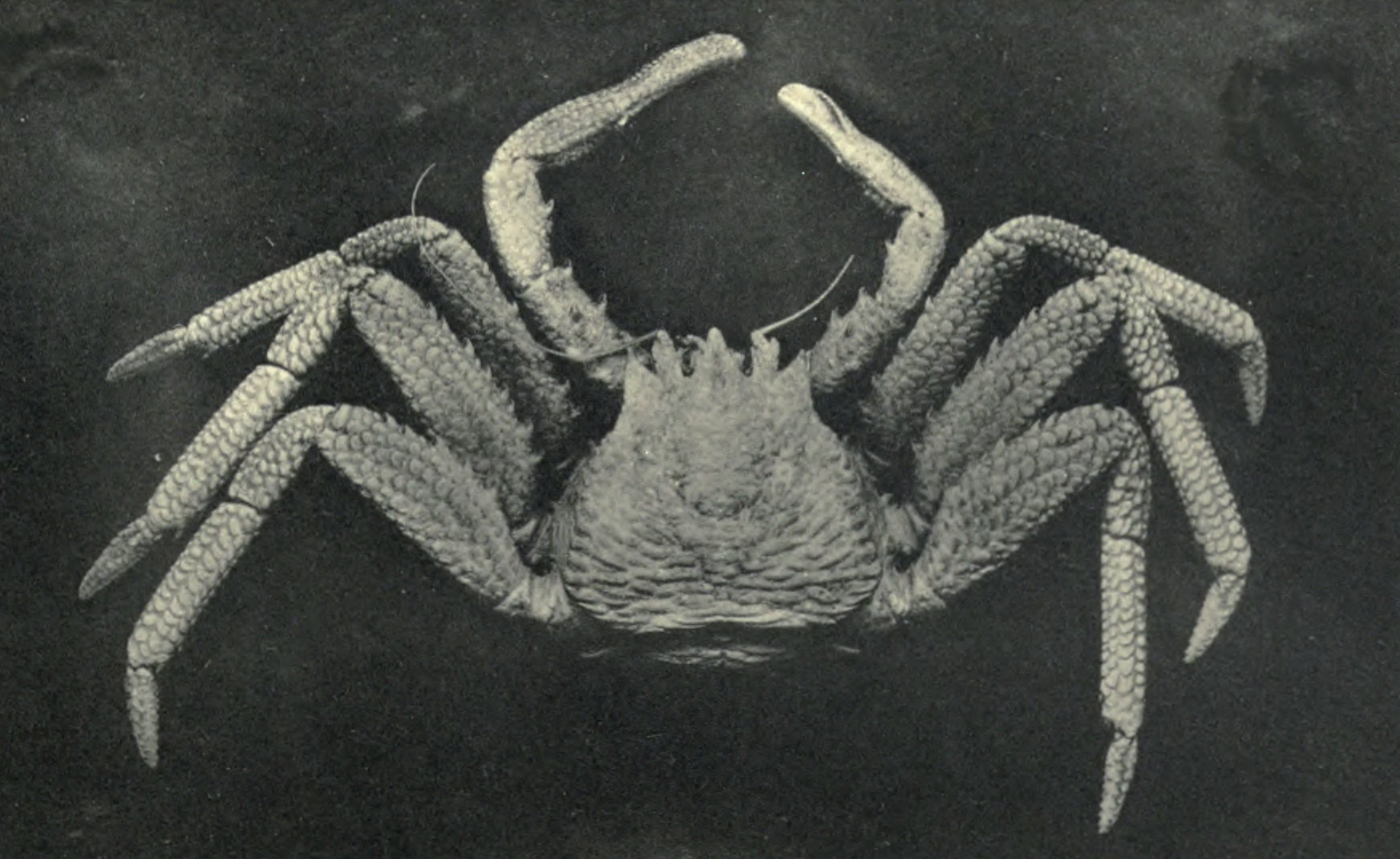
- P. wosnessenskii female
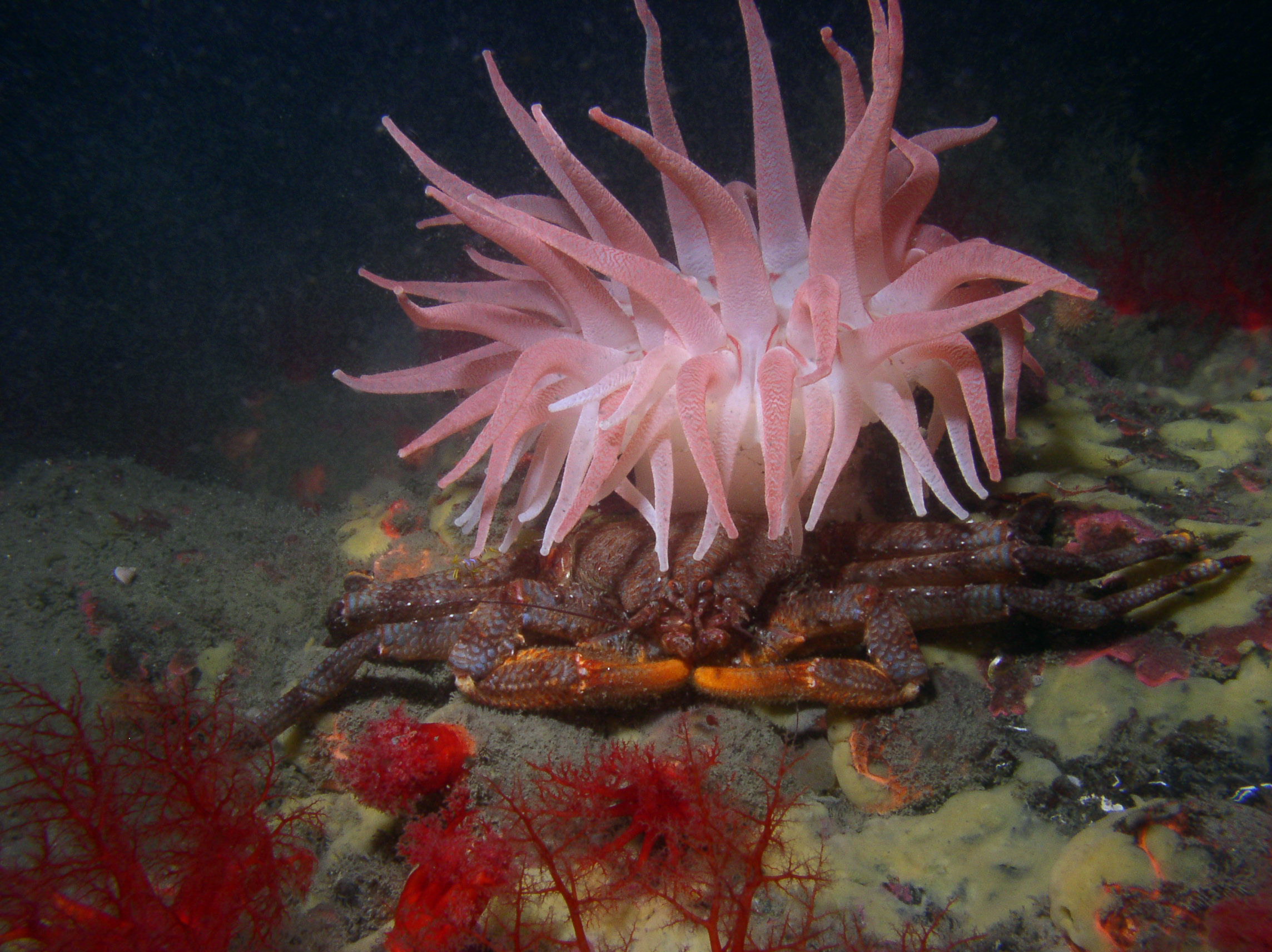
- P. wosnessenskii under the sea anemone Cribrinopsis fernaldi

Scientific classification
- Domain: Eukaryota
- Kingdom: Animalia
- Phylum: Arthropoda
- Class: Malacostraca
- Order: Decapoda
- Suborder: Pleocyemata
- Infraorder: Anomura
- Family: Lithodidae
- Genus: Placetron; Schalfeew, 1892
- Species: P. wosnessenskii

Binomial name
- Placetron wosnessenskii Schlafeew, 1892

Synonyms
- Lepeopus forcipatus Benedict, 1894

= Placetron =

Monospecific genus of king crab

Placetron wosnessenskii, common name the scaled crab, is a species of king crab found in most waters off North America's west coast. It is the only species in the genus Placetron.

== Description ==
Major characteristics include a soft leathery abdomen, a wide carapace narrowing at the anterior end much like a trapezoid, similar shaped chelae, and coloration ranging from a clouded green to reddish sometimes with banding along the legs. The name of this decapod is derived from the scale like pattern that covers its legs and partially covers its carapace. The odd structure of the chelae which are spoon-like in nature and are largely covered in setae.

== Range and habitat ==
The scaled crab is found in waters ranging from Pribilof Islands to Puget Sound. In most instances it is found at depths of up to 110 metres (360 ft), but may also inhabit shallow intertidal areas.

== Biology ==
The carapace width has been measured in size from 40 to 80 millimetres (1.6 to 3.1 in). Being a lithode crab it has an asymmetrical body. Diet of the scaled crab is known to include brittle stars as they have been witnessed feeding on the echinoderms. Few other prey species have been observed but it can be assumed that other food sources are similar to those of similar crab species. The crab themselves are prey to the sea otter and presumably other large predators. Females and males differ in the structure of their abdomen. The female's abdomen is covered in plates whereas the male's is covered in vestigial plates. These plates give the male a rubbery look and feel to their abdomens. Many have been observed to have a symbiotic relationship with certain species of sea anemone. They may be found inhabiting areas containing Metridium senile and Metridium farcimen.
