= Paralomis africana =

Scientific classification
- Kingdom: Animalia
- Phylum: Arthropoda
- Class: Malacostraca
- Order: Decapoda
- Suborder: Pleocyemata
- Infraorder: Anomura
- Family: Lithodidae
- Genus: Paralomis
- Species: P. africana

Binomial name
- Paralomis africana Macpherson, 1982

Species of king crab

Paralomis africana is a species of king crab found off the coast of Namibia. It has been found from 570–770 metres (1,870–2,530 ft). Its carapace is pentagonal and has been measured to a width of 74.2 millimetres (2.92 in) and a length of 65.8 millimetres (2.59 in).
