= George Samouelle =

British entomologist and museum curator

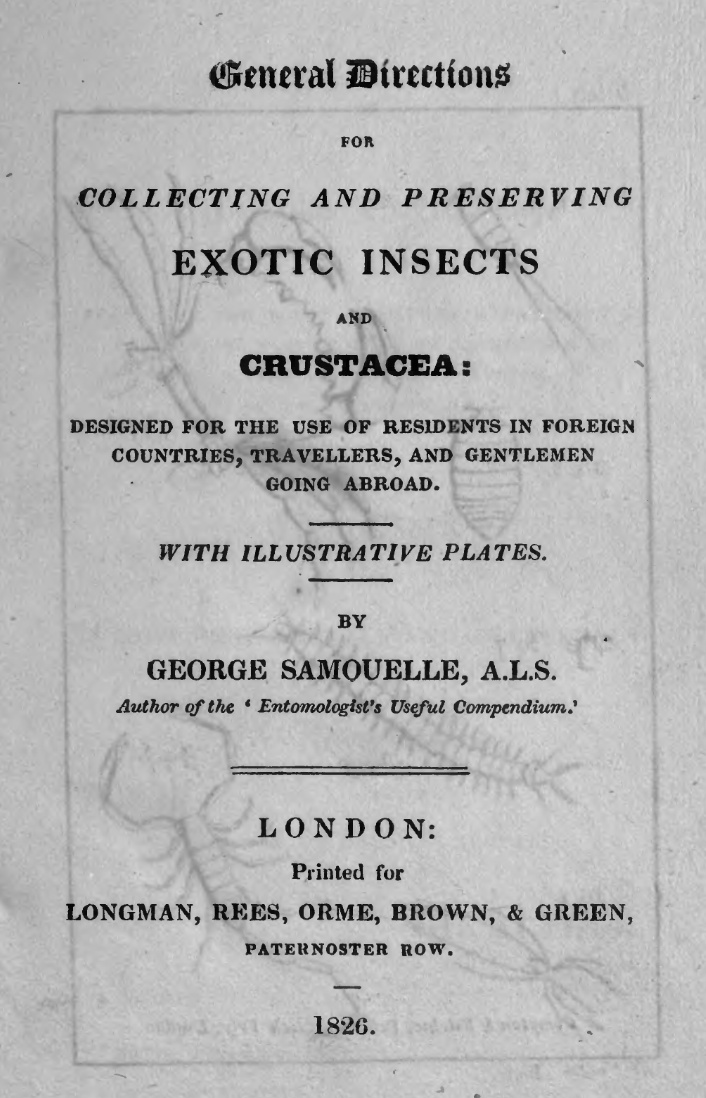
Collecting and Preserving Exotic Insects (1826)

George Samouelle (c. 1790–1846) was a curator in the British Museum (Natural History) of "no real scientific aptitude".

Originally employed as a bookseller for Longman & Co., Samouelle joined the Natural History Museum at the same time as William Elford Leach. Leach appears to have aided Samouelle greatly, with Bate & Westwood stating "Dr. Leach is the principal authority for Samouelle's work"; when Leach left the museum, Samouelle took over his position, but he "seemed incapable of independent work". Twenty years later, in 1840, after neglecting his work, drinking, insulting his superiors, and on one occasion, removing the labels from Adam White's specimens, Samouelle was sacked. He died less than five years later.

Samouelle was primarily interested in Lepidoptera but also wrote A nomenclature of British Entomology, or a catalogue of above 4000 species of the Classes Crustacea, Myriapoda, Spiders, Mites and insects intended as labels for cabinets of Insects, etc., alphabetically arranged. This work established new genera in other insect orders.

Samouelle was a founding member of the Entomological Club in 1826, along with Abraham Davies, Samuel Henson and Edward Newman.
