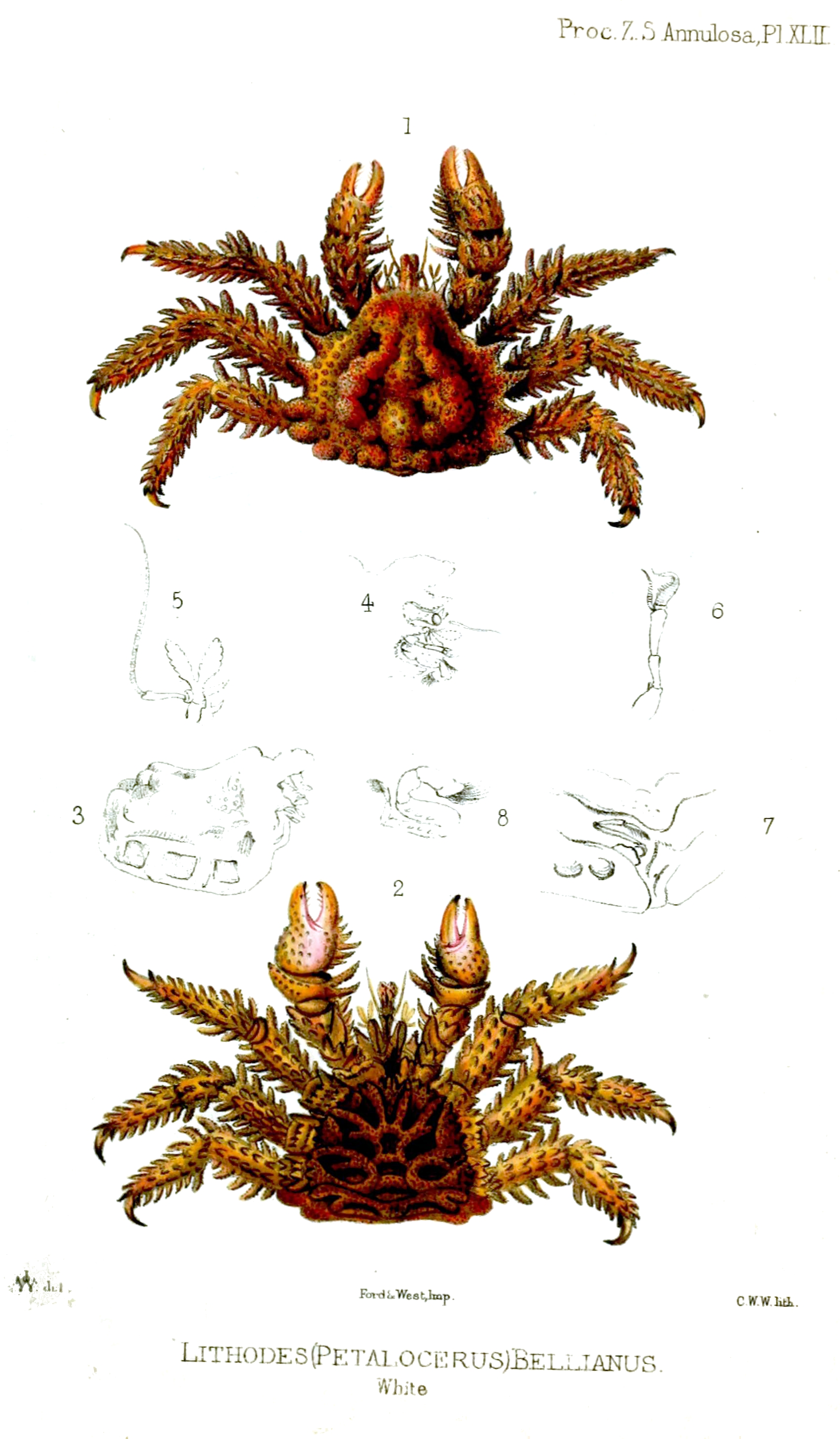

Scientific classification
- Domain: Eukaryota
- Kingdom: Animalia
- Phylum: Arthropoda
- Class: Malacostraca
- Order: Decapoda
- Suborder: Pleocyemata
- Infraorder: Anomura
- Family: Lithodidae
- Genus: Phyllolithodes; Brandt, 1848
- Species: P. papillosus

Binomial name
- Phyllolithodes papillosus Brandt, 1848

Synonyms
- Petalocerus bicornis White, 1855

= Phyllolithodes =

Monospecific genus of king crab

Phyllolithodes is a monospecific genus of king crab in the family Lithodidae. Its only species, Phyllolithodes papillosus (nicknamed the flatspine triangle crab), lives in the intertidal zone and the subtidal zone. It can be found as far north as Unalaska in the Aleutian Islands and as far south as San Miguel Island in Southern California. Phyllolithodes is likely a sister genus of Rhinolithodes.
