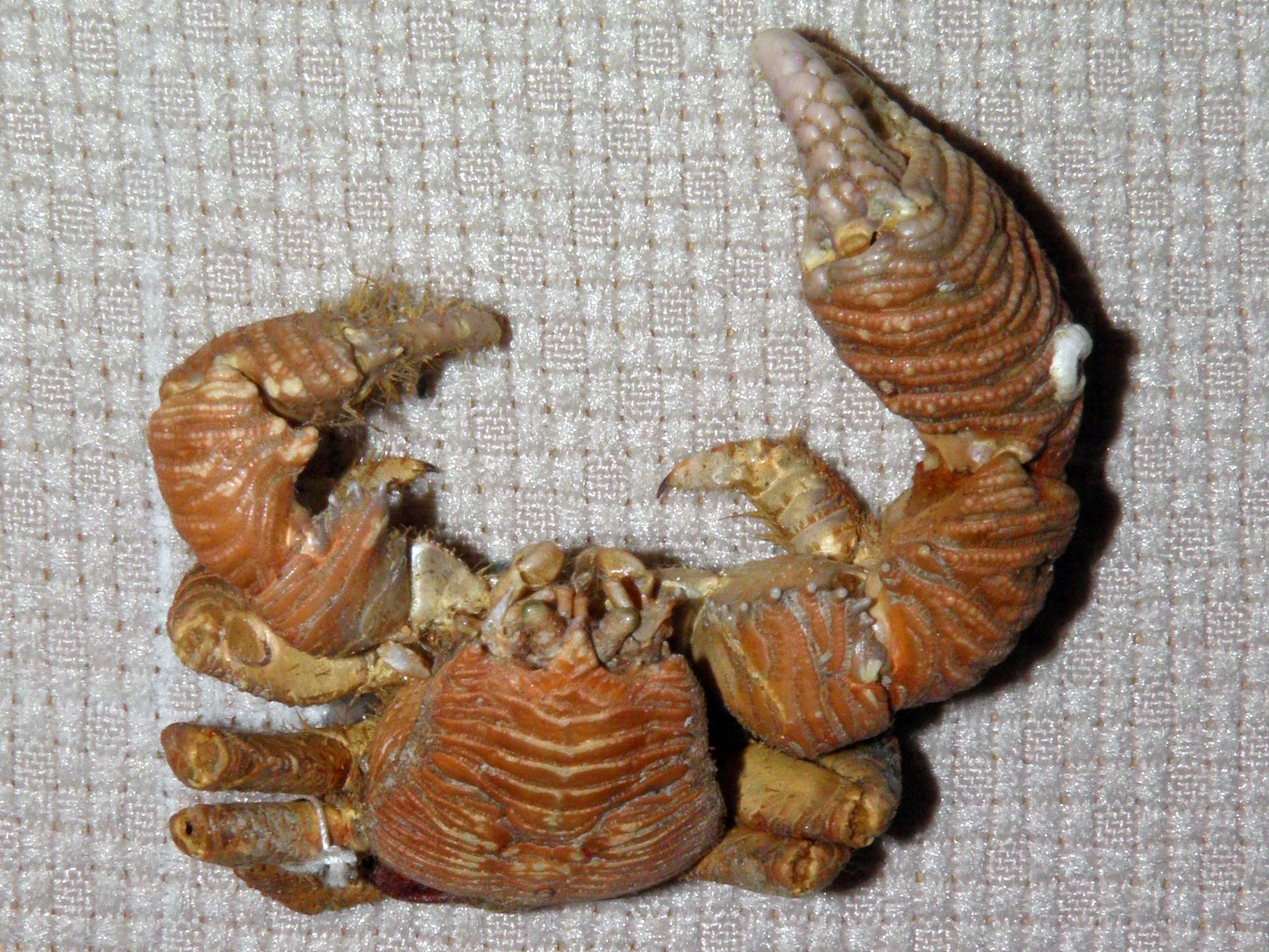
- Dermaturus mandtii

Scientific classification
- Domain: Eukaryota
- Kingdom: Animalia
- Phylum: Arthropoda
- Class: Malacostraca
- Order: Decapoda
- Suborder: Pleocyemata
- Infraorder: Anomura
- Family: Lithodidae
- Genus: Dermaturus; Brandt, 1850
- Species: D. mandtii

Binomial name
- Dermaturus mandtii Brandt, 1850

= Dermaturus =

Monospecific genus of king crab

Dermaturus is a monotypic genus of king crab. The only species in the genus is Dermaturus mandtii named after the physician and naturalist Martin Wilhelm Mandt.
