= Lithodes nintokuae =

Scientific classification
- Kingdom: Animalia
- Phylum: Arthropoda
- Class: Malacostraca
- Order: Decapoda
- Suborder: Pleocyemata
- Infraorder: Anomura
- Family: Lithodidae
- Genus: Lithodes
- Species: L. nintokuae

Binomial name
- Lithodes nintokuae Sakai, 1978

Species of king crab

Lithodes nintokuae is a species of king crab. It is found between depths of 450–1,070 m (1,480–3,510 ft) in the central Pacific Ocean on the Hawaiian–Emperor seamount chain, as far southeast as Hawaii and as far northwest as the Nintoku Seamount.
