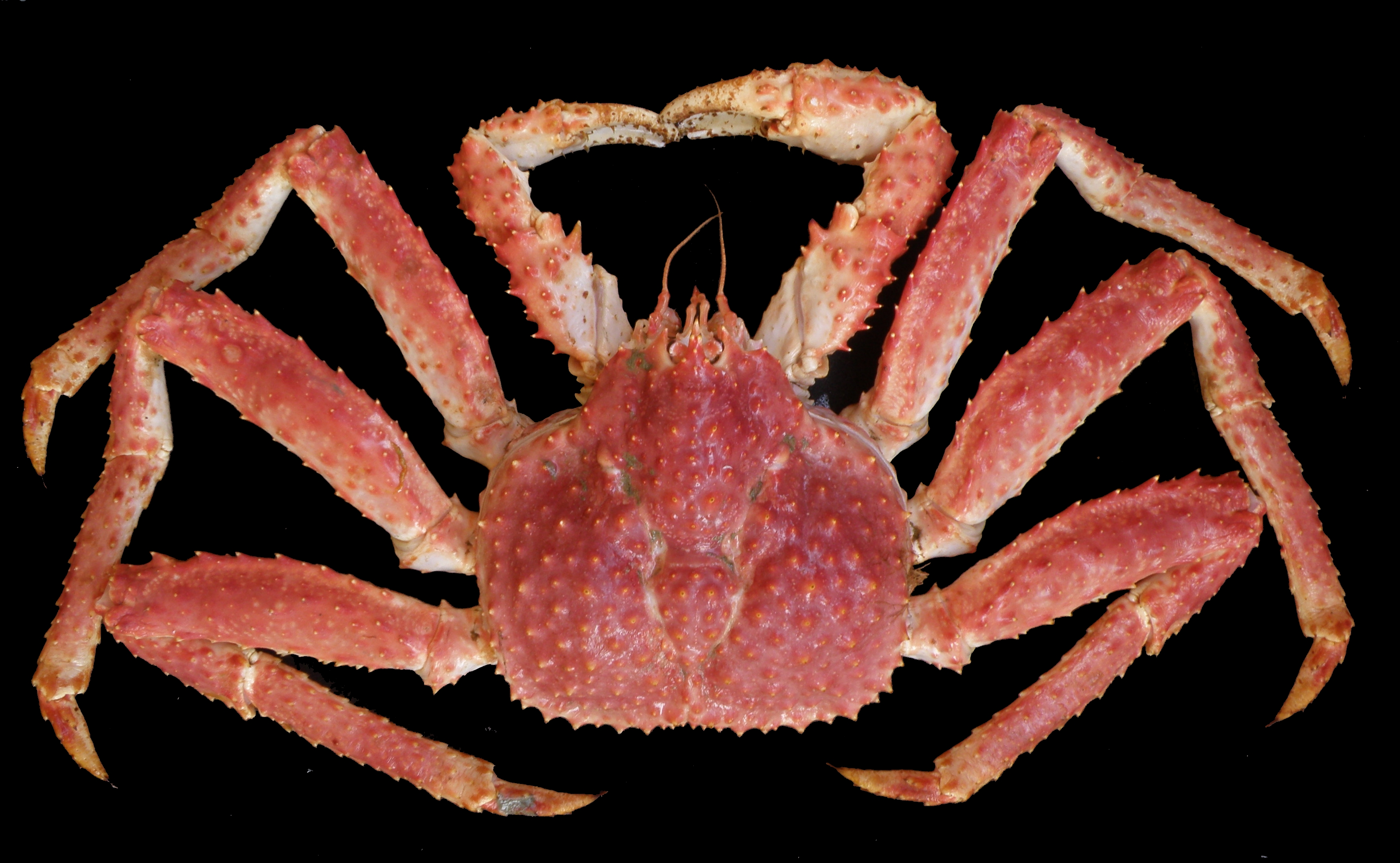
- L. confundens from the continental shelf of Patagonia, Argentina

Scientific classification
- Kingdom: Animalia
- Phylum: Arthropoda
- Class: Malacostraca
- Order: Decapoda
- Suborder: Pleocyemata
- Infraorder: Anomura
- Family: Lithodidae
- Genus: Lithodes
- Species: L. confundens

Binomial name
- Lithodes confundens Macpherson, 1988

= Lithodes confundens =

Species of king crab

Lithodes confundens is a species of king crab. It is found on muddy bottoms off the southern coasts of South America from a depth of 0–283 m (0–928 ft).
