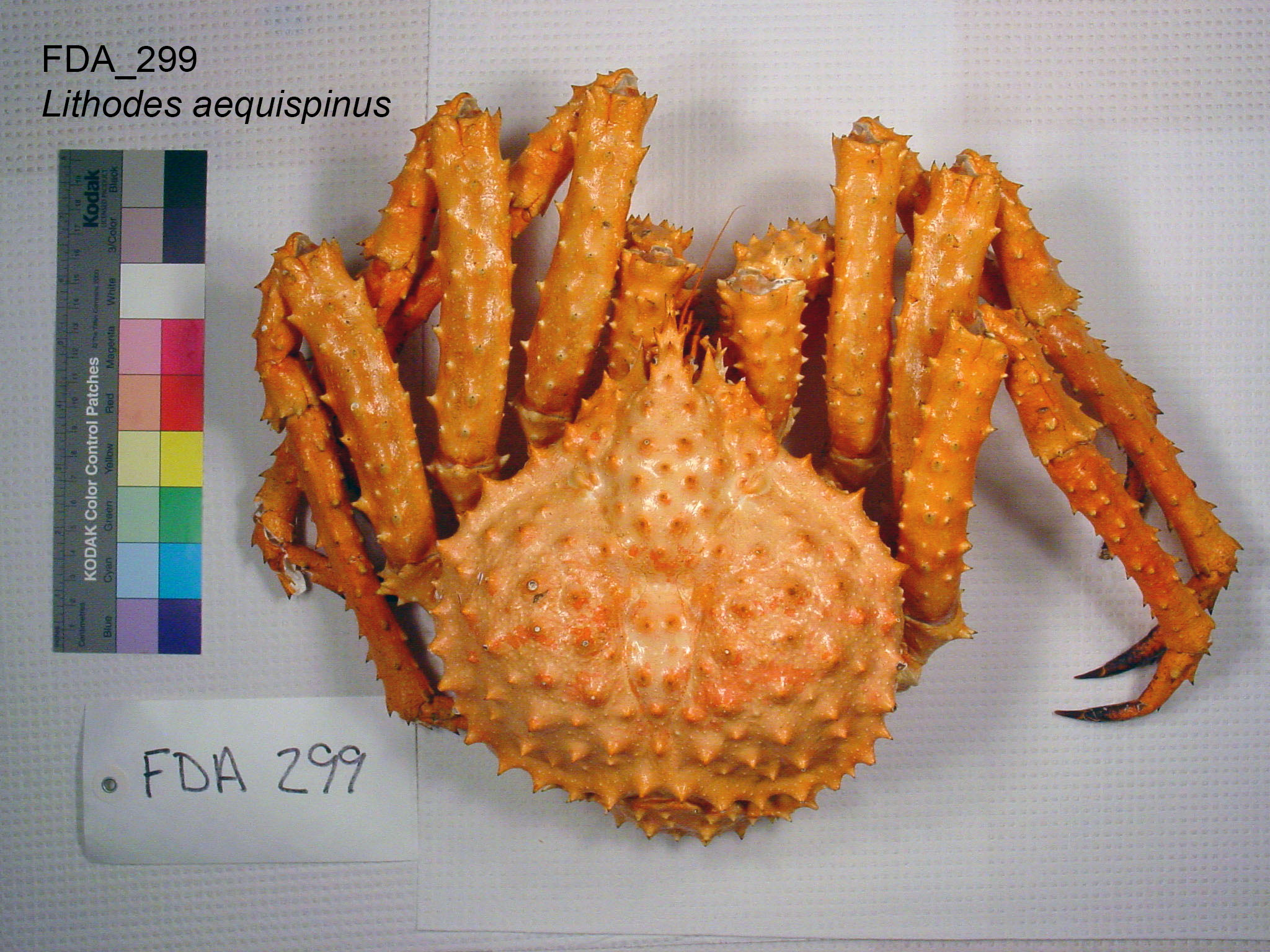

Scientific classification
- Kingdom: Animalia
- Phylum: Arthropoda
- Class: Malacostraca
- Order: Decapoda
- Suborder: Pleocyemata
- Infraorder: Anomura
- Family: Lithodidae
- Genus: Lithodes
- Species: L. aequispinus

Binomial name
- Lithodes aequispinus (Benedict J. E., 1895)

Synonyms
- Paralithodes longirostris Navozov-Lavroff, 1929

= Lithodes aequispinus =

Species of king crab

Lithodes aequispinus, the golden king crab, also known as the brown king crab, is a king crab species native to the North Pacific. Golden king crabs are primarily found in the Aleutian Islands and waters nearer to Alaska and British Columbia; their range also extends to the Russian far east and Japan, albeit with a less dense population. Golden king crabs are the smallest of the three commercially viable Alaskan king crab species with an average weight between 5 and 8 lbs (2.3 - 3.6 kg); the other two species being the blue and red king crabs. Golden king crabs were historically caught incidentally in red king crab fisheries, but the first commercial landing took place in 1975; in 1981, the targeted pot-fishing method, a hybrid fishing method specifically for golden king crab, was developed.

== Description ==
The golden king crab is a North Pacific king crab, a decapod crustacean. They have five pairs of legs, the front pair carries their claws. Golden king crabs get their name from the orange-brown to golden hue of their shells, which are mostly made of calcium. Like other king crabs, golden king crabs are large and have long, spiny legs; compared with blue and red king crabs, though, they are smaller by a great deal, with a typical weight between 5 and 8 lb, and notably thinner legs. The golden king crab also has a distinctive carapace, which typically has five to nine spines on the mid-dorsal plate. Unrelated to their size, golden king crabs generally have the lowest meat-fill in proportion to their bodies compared with other Alaskan king crabs. They also have a fan-shaped tail flap located on the rear and underside of their bodies; adult female crabs brood embryos underneath their tail flaps.

Although L. aequispinus may be referred to as either "golden king crab" or "brown king crab", the US Code of Federal Regulations Title 21 Food and Drugs part 102 section 102.50 declared that the appropriate market name for its product is “brown king crabmeat”, but as of November 2017, this was overridden by section 774 of the Consolidated Appropriations Act, 2017, which established the proper market name as “golden king crabmeat”. Manufacturers and sellers of products containing L. aequispinus were granted until January 1, 2020, to make the appropriate change to product labels.

== Distribution and habitat ==
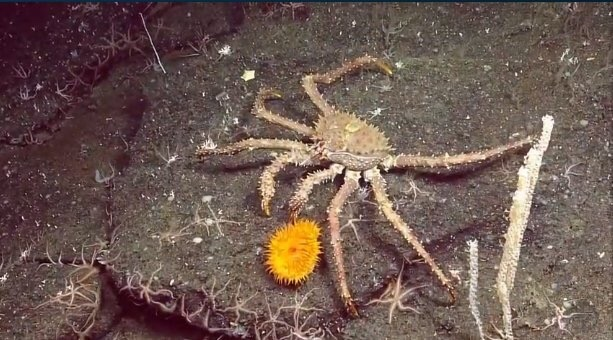
Lithodes aequispinus in its habitat

The primary range of the golden king crab is around the Aleutian Islands and waters surrounding southern Alaska and British Columbia, as well as the Russian far east and Japan to a lesser degree. Substantial Alaskan populations of golden king crabs occur off of the Pribilof and Shumagin Islands, Shelikof Strait, Prince William Sound, and the lower Chatham Strait in Southeastern Alaska.

Golden king crabs typically inhabit waters ranging from 300 to 1000 meters in depth. They usually avoid open sand substrates, instead favoring complex sloping and rocky habitats, often relying on boulders or structure forming sessile invertebrates such as coral or sponges for habitat. Adult golden king crabs exhibit an annual deep and back migratory pattern during which they travel to shallow waters in the late winter to molt and mate. This is followed by a return to deeper waters, where they feed and exist for most of the year. Golden king crabs often occupy deeper waters than red king crabs; within their geographical range they are the most abundant species of crab.

== Reproduction and lifecycle ==
Golden king crabs exhibit 20-month asynchronous reproductive cycles during which female crabs typically brood 10,000 to 30,000 eggs underneath their fan-shaped tail flaps for roughly a year. Golden king crabs have the largest eggs of the three commercially viable king crab species. Offspring emerge as swimming larvae, but are weak and susceptible to underwater currents. Throughout their transformation into adulthood, golden king crabs undergo several physical transformations via molting. Offspring eventually settle at the bottom of the ocean in waters with a usual minimum depth of 300 ft.

Golden king crabs are typically classified as juveniles in their first few years. After reaching sexual maturity around 4 to 5 years of age, they are classified as adults. Golden king crabs molt throughout their entire lives, and juveniles do so more frequently than adults. Due to reproductive necessity, females molt more often than their male counterparts, which can keep their shells for one to two years at a time.

Throughout their lives, golden king crabs exhibit an annual offshore “deep and back” migrational pattern, which involves male and female crabs arriving in shallow water in late winter and early spring to molt their shells and mate. When embryos hatch in late spring, they then migrate to deeper waters for feeding, wherein they are not typically found with crabs of the opposite sex nor with red or blue king crabs.

Golden king crabs consume a wide variety of species, including worms, clams, mussels, snails, sea stars, urchins, sand dollars, barnacles, algae, sponges, and even other crabs and crustaceans. Many crabs have a strong sense of smell; the golden king crab uses this to locate food. Golden king crabs are also preyed on by various fishes such as Pacific cod, halibut, and yellowfin sole, as well as sea otters. Nemertean worms have also been found to consume the embryos of golden king crabs.

== Fisheries ==
Due to their small size, golden king crabs are not as popular as blue or red king crab, but they are widely fished throughout Alaska, particularly in the Aleutian Islands. In comparison with other commercially viable king crabs, golden king crabs are noted as being similar in flavor, but perhaps milder and sweeter.

To protect the golden king crab stock in Alaska, several regulations have been established. Crab fishermen may only catch and harvest males of a legal size, that being 7 inches (180 mm) or larger laterally across the carapace. Fishing also must not coincide with mating and molting periods.

After the North Pacific Council approved stock assessments of golden king crab, state managers were allowed the authority to increase crab fishing quotas by the Alaska Board of Fish. As of 2015, in coordination with the industry, the state has conducted numerous surveys of golden king crab stock. As of August 2018, quotas for golden king crab fishing rose for the first time in 20 years. This allowed the taking of 3.9 million pounds of golden king crab east of Adak island, and 2.5 million pounds west of Adak, increases of 18 and 11%, respectively. In the following season, as of August 2019, quotas for golden king crab harvest were again increased, allowing 4.3 million pounds to be taken east of Atka island, and 2.9 million west of Atka. The raised quota represented respective increases of 12 and 15% since the previous season. The 2019 golden king crab season is the second for which the government's new stock assessment model was used. The new stock assessment model determines seasonal crab stock more thoroughly than previous methods and is unique to golden king crab.
