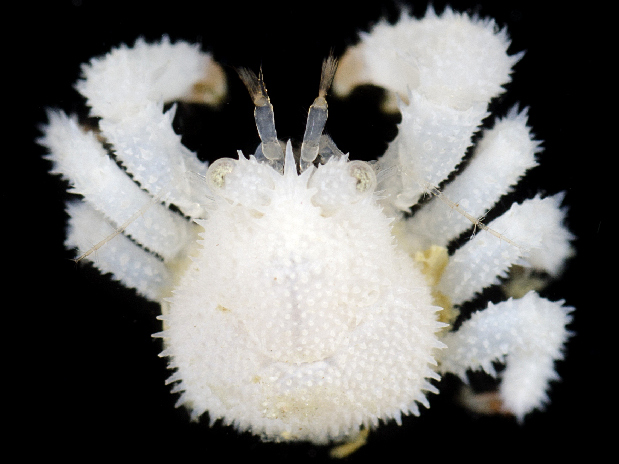
- Acantholithodes hispidus

Scientific classification
- Domain: Eukaryota
- Kingdom: Animalia
- Phylum: Arthropoda
- Class: Malacostraca
- Order: Decapoda
- Suborder: Pleocyemata
- Infraorder: Anomura
- Family: Lithodidae
- Genus: Acantholithodes; Holmes, 1895
- Species: A. hispidus

Binomial name
- Acantholithodes hispidus (Stimpson, 1860)

= Acantholithodes =

Monospecific genus of king crab

Acantholithodes is a monotypic genus of king crab. Its only species is Acantholithodes hispidus.
