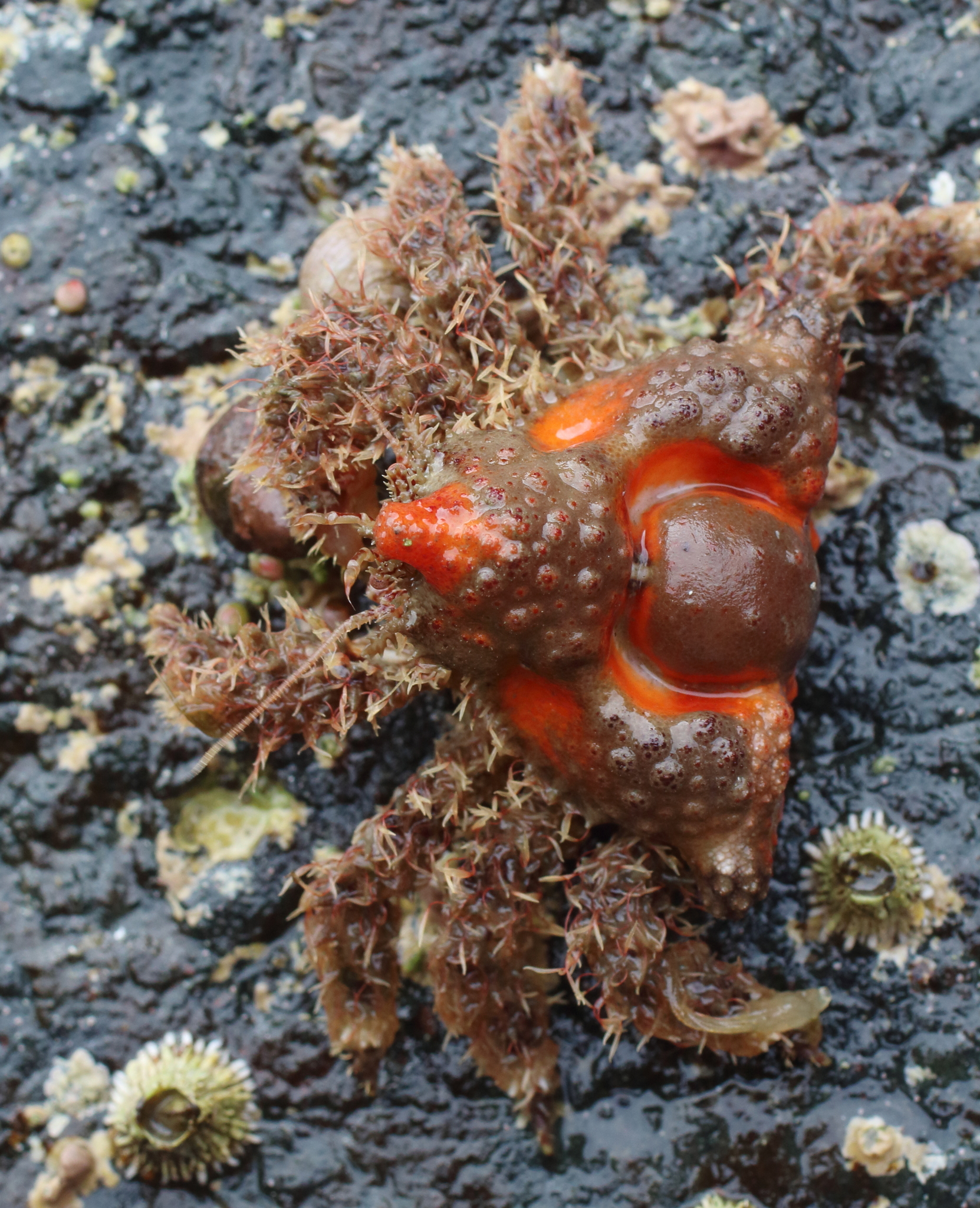
- Rhinoceros crab

Scientific classification
- Kingdom: Animalia
- Phylum: Arthropoda
- Class: Malacostraca
- Order: Decapoda
- Suborder: Pleocyemata
- Infraorder: Anomura
- Family: Lithodidae
- Genus: Rhinolithodes
- Species: R. wosnessenskii

Binomial name
- Rhinolithodes wosnessenskii Brandt, 1848

= Rhinolithodes =

Monospecific genus of king crab

Rhinolithodes wosnessenskii, also called the rhinoceros crab, is a species of king crab, the only species in the genus Rhinolithodes. The species is named after Ilya Gavrilovich Voznesenski. It is found at depths of 6–73 metres (20–240 ft) in the north-east Pacific Ocean from Kodiak, Alaska to Crescent City, California.

R. wosnessenskii grows to 7 centimetres (2.8 in) across the carapace, which is triangular and has a deep semicircular depression. The legs are covered in spines and long setae. It lives in crevices on rocky or gravel bottoms, and is only rarely encountered. Rhinolithodes is likely a sister genus to Phyllolithodes.
