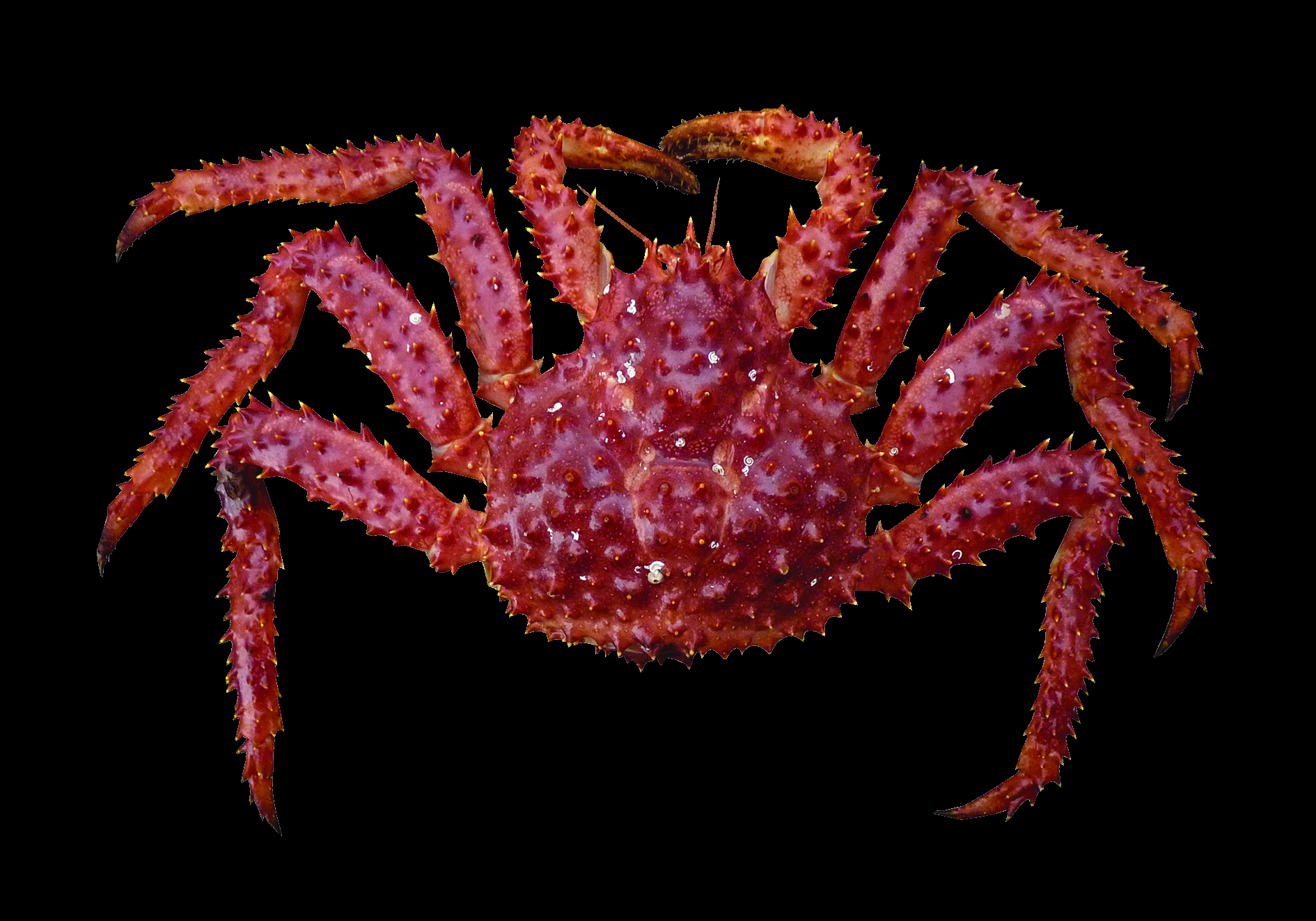
- Female L. santolla from the Beagle Channel

Scientific classification
- Kingdom: Animalia
- Phylum: Arthropoda
- Class: Malacostraca
- Order: Decapoda
- Suborder: Pleocyemata
- Infraorder: Anomura
- Family: Lithodidae
- Genus: Lithodes
- Species: L. santolla

Binomial name
- Lithodes santolla (Molina, 1782)

Synonyms
- Cancer Santolla Molina, 1782; Lithodes antarctica Hombron & Jacquinot, 1842; Pseudolithodes zenkevitchi Birstein & Vinogradov, 1972

= Lithodes santolla =

Species of king crab

Lithodes santolla, also known as the southern king crab, Chilean king crab or centolla, is a species of king crab, found off southern South America including the offshore Falkland Islands. On the Pacific side, it is found in Chile from Talcahuano to Cape Horn. On the Atlantic side, it is found off Argentina and Uruguay. It lives in the benthic zone at depths of 0–700 m (0–2,300 ft), with Uruguayan records being exclusively from great depths. In Chile, it mostly lives at depths to 150 m (490 ft), but south of 40° S it can be found to 600 m (2,000 ft). It is a large crab that can reach up to 19 cm (7.5 in) in carapace length, and it is the target of commercial fishing.

== Physiology ==
L. santolla lives in cold-temperature and subantarctic waters. Ideal temperatures for its larval and juvenile development range from 6 to 15 °C (43 to 59 °F), and its larval stages are nonfeeding. It experiences respiratory acidosis and hyperglycemia after prolonged exposure to air; however, these levels eventually return to normal after reimmersion, making it capable of withstanding long periods of aerial exposure with no detrimental effect on mortality.

== Fisheries ==
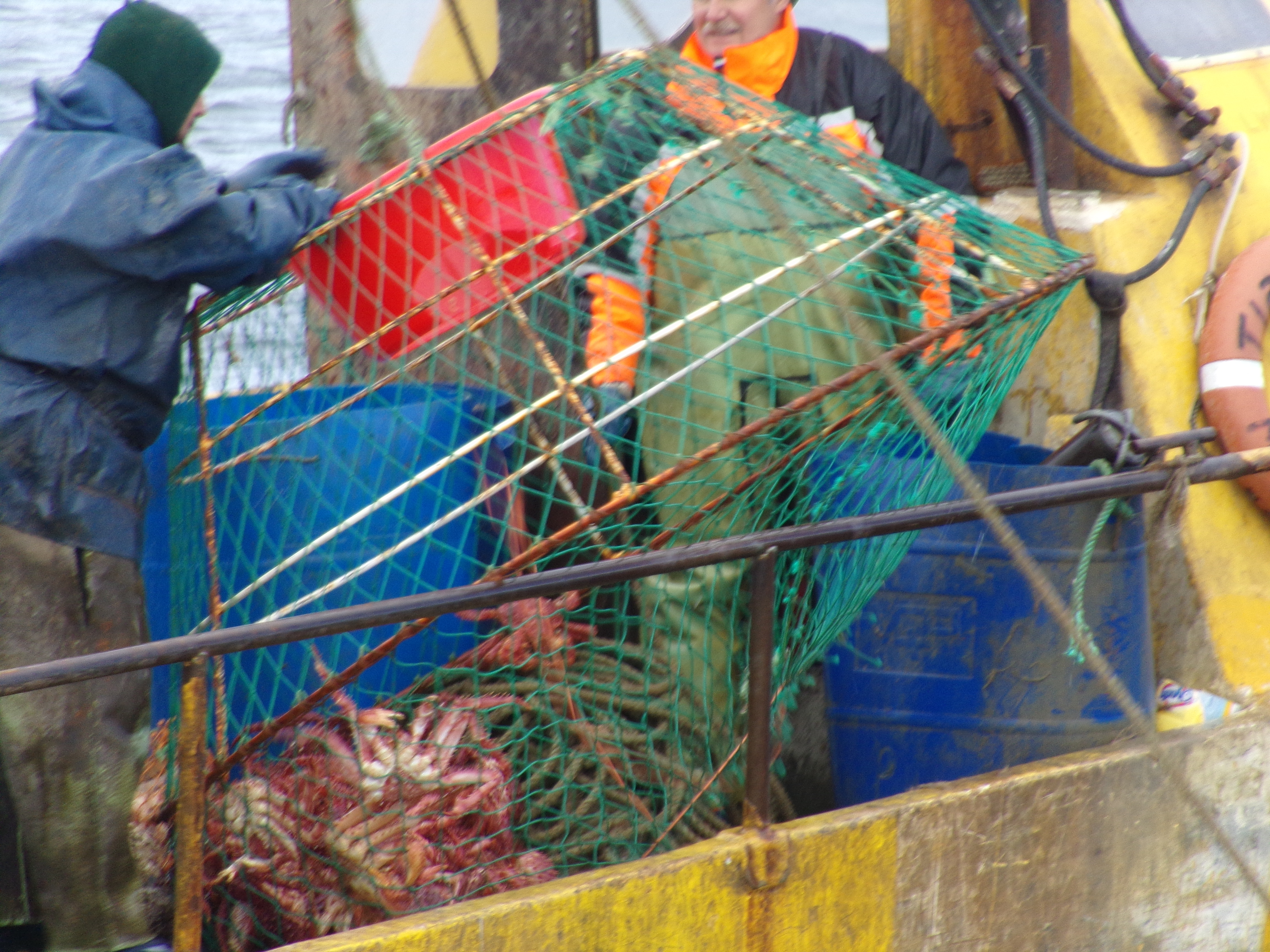
Fishing for L. santolla in Ushuaia Bay

The population of Lithodes santolla has seen a dramatic decline due to commercial fishing.

The lucrative centolla fishery around Tierra del Fuego led to an incident in August 1967 when the Argentine schooner Cruz del Sur was found fishing 400 metres (1,300 ft) from Gable Island and had to be escorted out of Chilean waters by the Chilean patrol boat Marinero Fuentealba. This event among many others led to the Beagle crisis in the late 1970s.

The United States Food and Drug Administration lists the centolla crab and southern king crab as two separate species: Lithodes antarcticus and Lithodes santolla respectively. Other sources consider Lithodes antarcticus to be a synonym of Lithodes santolla.
