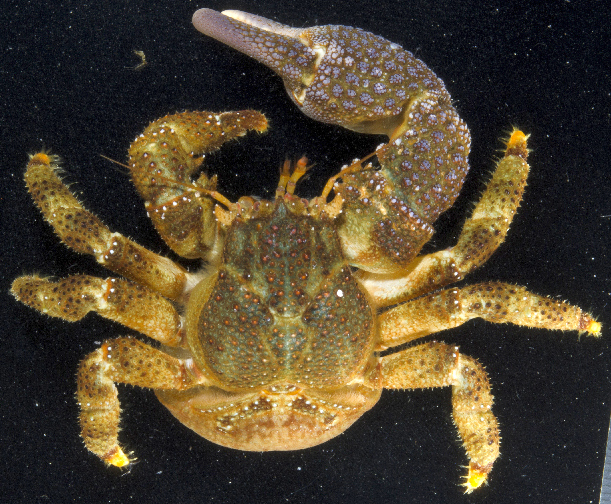
- Oedignathus inermis

Scientific classification
- Kingdom: Animalia
- Phylum: Arthropoda
- Class: Malacostraca
- Order: Decapoda
- Suborder: Pleocyemata
- Infraorder: Anomura
- Family: Lithodidae
- Genus: Oedignathus; Benedict, 1895
- Species: O. inermis

Binomial name
- Oedignathus inermis (Stimpson, 1860)

Synonyms
- Oedignathus gilli Benedict, 1895

= Oedignathus =

Monospecific genus of king crab

Oedignathus inermis, commonly known as the granular claw crab, paxillose crab, or tuberculate nestling lithode crab, is a species of king crab in the subfamily Hapalogastrinae. It is found off the Pacific coasts of the United States and Canada, from California to the Chukchi Sea. It is also distributed in the Russian Far East and disjunctly around the coasts of Japan. It is the only species in the genus Oedignathus, from Ancient Greek οἰδάω (oidáō), meaning "to swell", and γνάθος (gnáthos), meaning "jaw".

== Description ==
Oedignathus is distinguished from other king crabs in the subfamily Hapalogastrinae by the presence of numerous tubercles on the only slightly flattened chelipeds and legs, and by the paucity of spines, setae; other genera have flattened chelipeds covered in setae, and legs with several large spines.

== Ecology ==
O. inermis lives in pairs under the purplish coralline algae which encrust the rocks around the low tide mark, and may be found at depths of 0–45 metres (0–150 ft). When in the littoral zone, O. inermis is associated with mussel beds, but it spends more time in the sublittoral zone. Larvae are released in January and February, at a similar time to other hermit crabs, perhaps to coincide with seasonal blooms of plankton for the larvae to feed on.

O. inermis is preyed upon by birds such as the American black oystercatcher.
