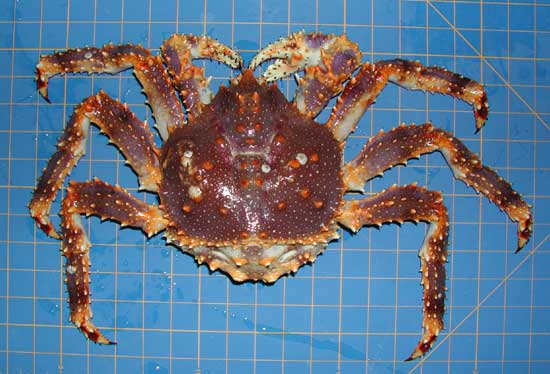

Scientific classification
- Domain: Eukaryota
- Kingdom: Animalia
- Phylum: Arthropoda
- Class: Malacostraca
- Order: Decapoda
- Suborder: Pleocyemata
- Infraorder: Anomura
- Family: Lithodidae
- Genus: Paralithodes
- Species: P. platypus

Binomial name
- Paralithodes platypus (Brandt, 1851)
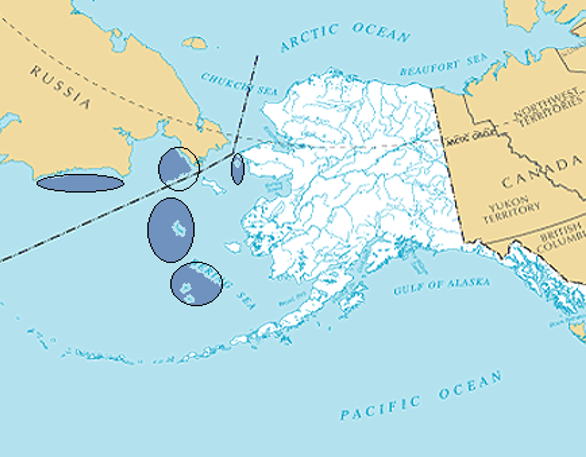
- Distribution in the Bering Sea region (not showing population further south off northeast Asia)

Synonyms
- Lithodes platypus J.F. Brandt in von Middendorf, 1851

= Paralithodes platypus =

Species of king crab

Paralithodes platypus, the blue king crab, is a species of king crab from cold waters in the North Pacific Ocean and adjacent seas. They are generally smaller than red king crabs.

== Distribution ==
The blue king crab is found in cold waters in the Bering Sea, extending slightly into adjacent parts of the Chukchi Sea, off the Kamchatka Peninsula and northeastern Hokkaido, and in the Sea of Okhotsk. In the Bering Sea, the species is less widespread compared to red king crabs. The main populations near Alaska are found near the Diomede Islands, Point Hope, St. Matthew Island, and the Pribilof Islands. Additionally, a second, separate population exists in the Norton Sound all the way to St. Lawrence Island. Blue king crabs have a more northerly distribution compared to red king crabs, which is due to the colder waters of the northern Bering Sea being suitable for blue king crabs to survive. Their limited distribution is hypothesized to have been caused by a retreat into deeper, colder waters during a period of post-glacial warming. The hypothesis additionally suggests that the cause of P. platypus' disjunct distribution within Alaska was caused by a dramatic contraction of their population during the warmer post-glacial period.

== Migration ==
Female blue king crabs migrate seasonally from depths of 130–180 m (430–590 ft) in winter to shallow depths of 6–10 m (20–33 ft) for females with eggs and 50–80 m (160–260 ft) for females without eggs. The average depth for male crabs of commercial size is 70 m (230 ft), although crabs can commonly be caught at shallower depths in winter.

== Reproduction ==
Pribilof Island blue king crabs mate and produce eggs in late March to early May. Females generally brood their eggs externally for 12–14 months. Since blue king crabs need more than a year to brood their eggs, they miss a breeding cycle just before the larvae hatch and only produce eggs every other year, although first-time breeders can often produce eggs in subsequent years. Females release larvae around the middle of April in the Pribilof Islands, while those held at warmer temperatures in the laboratory may release larvae as early as February.

Female blue king crabs in the Pribilof Islands grow to the largest size before they are reproductively mature. About 50% of crabs are mature at 5 in (130 mm) CL. St. Matthew Island females can become sexually mature at 3 in (76 mm) CL, and Diomede crabs are similar. Larger female crabs from the Pribilof Islands have the highest fecundity, producing 162,360 eggs or 110,033 larvae per crab. The reduction in fecundity is about 33% between the egg and larval stages. In Japan, an average of 120,000 larvae were released from each blue king crab. Diomede blue king crabs release an average of 60,000 larvae per female.

Environmental variables, such as tides, temperature, salinity, light, phytoplankton blooms, and predation, are seasonally pulsed and likely serve as cues for larval release. Release of larvae over a longer period may serve to give the female a larger window for larvae to correspond with any favorable environmental conditions that may exist, also known as “bet-hedging”. In the laboratory, Pribilof larvae hatch over the course of about one month, and Diomede larvae hatch over the course of 2–3 weeks. These differences may be due to water temperature in the laboratory, which has a clear effect on embryonic and larval development, and is probably slightly different from hatch timing in a natural environment.

== Fisheries ==
Commercial blue king crab fisheries around the eastern Bering Sea began in the mid-1960s. Over 13,228,000 pounds (6,000 t) of blue king crabs were caught during 1981, the peak for blue king crab fisheries as well as the year after red king crab fisheries peaked. The Pribilof Island harvest by the United States peaked in 1980 at 10,935,000 lb (4,960 t) and was closed in 1988 due to population decline, then again in 1999 after being opened for three years. The St. Matthew fishery peaked in 1983 with 9,453,500 lb (4,288.0 t) but experienced a similar decline and was closed in 1999. It was opened in 2009, and was featured on the television show Deadliest Catch. The St. Matthew stock is rebuilding but the fishery remains closed, while the Pribilof stock has not drastically improved. Diomede blue king crabs have never been harvested commercially, but support a subsistence fishery for the Native Village of Diomede, Alaska, population 170.

Colder water slows the rate of crab growth and crabs at northern latitudes are often smaller than more southern crabs. Commercial harvest of blue king crabs at the Pribilof Islands is limited to males with a carapace width (CW) over 6.5 in (17 cm) and St. Matthew Island is limited to crabs with CW greater than 5.5 in (14 cm), corresponding to crabs over 4.7 in (12 cm) carapace length (CL). Diomede blue king crabs are similar in size to St. Matthew Island crabs.
