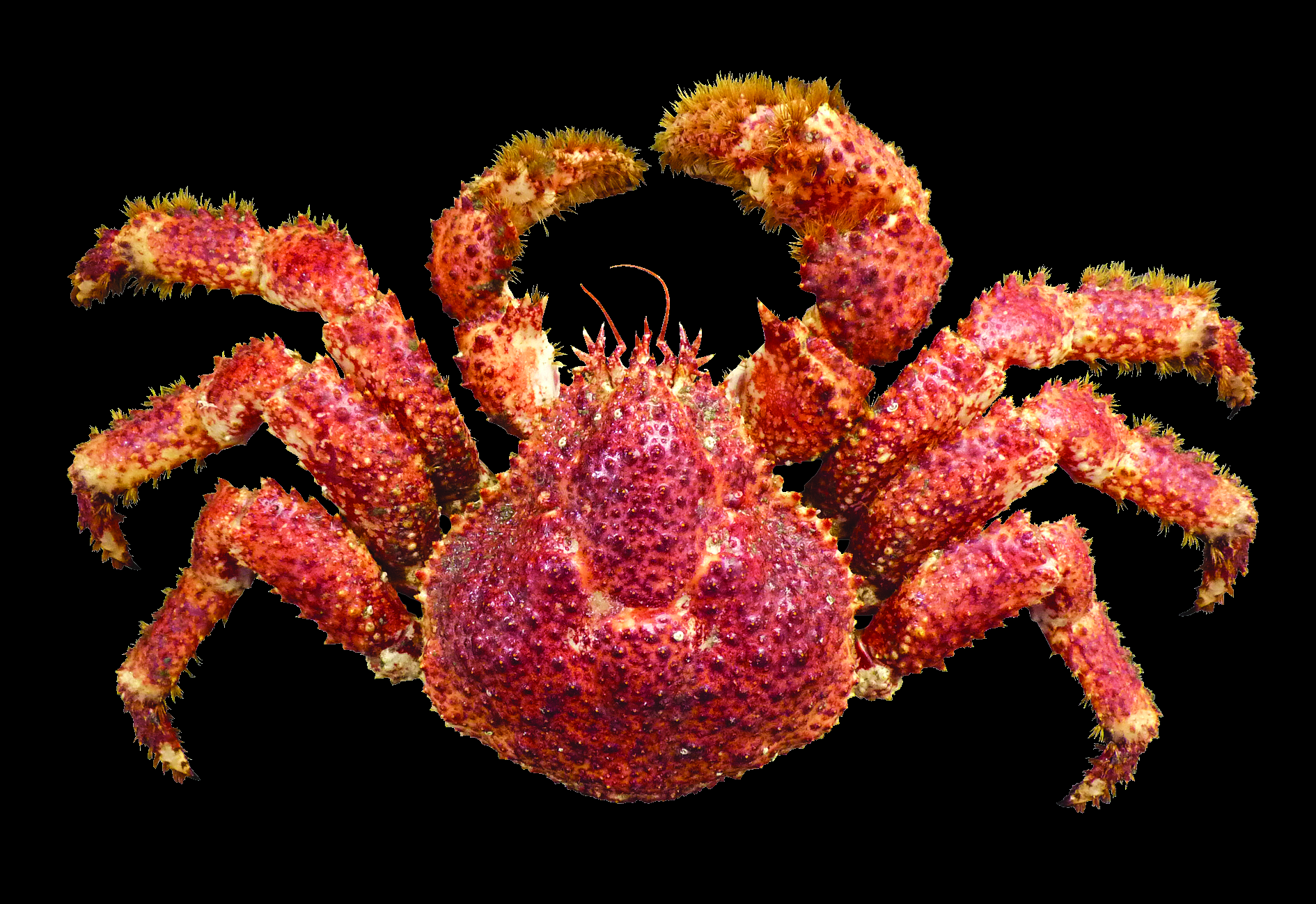
- Paralomis granulosa

Scientific classification
- Kingdom: Animalia
- Phylum: Arthropoda
- Clade: Pancrustacea
- Class: Malacostraca
- Order: Decapoda
- Suborder: Pleocyemata
- Infraorder: Anomura
- Family: Lithodidae
- Subfamily: Lithodinae
- Genus: Paralomis; White, 1856

Type species
- Paralomis granulosa (Hombron & Jacquinot, 1846)

Synonyms
- Acantholithus Stimpson, 1858; Leptolithodes Benedict, 1895; Pristopus Benedict, 1895

= Paralomis =

Genus of king crabs

Paralomis is a widely distributed, highly speciose, and morphologically diverse genus of king crabs in the subfamily Lithodinae.

== Description ==
Like all king crabs, Paralomis has evolved a crab-like appearance through a process called carcinisation. Paralomis has either a pentagonal or pyriform carapace. At the very front, its rostrum consists of one short, conical spine projecting forward in the middle and one or more pairs of spines angled upward around the base. Like all king crabs, the gastric region, directly behind the rostrum, is elevated above the others. Like Lithodes and Neolithodes, the cardiac region – directly behind the gastric region, separated by a deep groove – is triangular. Its three pairs of walking legs – morphologically similar, with the middle pair typically being the longest – are not covered at their bases by the carapace. In adults, the undersides of the dactyli feature horn-like spines. The abdomen is more calcified than in other king crab genera: the second segment is undivided, the third segment has fused submedian and marginal (outer) plates, and segments three, four, and five are all entirely calcified.

== Distribution ==
Paralomis is present in four of Earth's five oceans – namely the Atlantic, Pacific, Indian, and Southern – as well as all seven continents. They are found from the very shallow intertidal zone to the deep, perpetually dark abyssal zone. The deepest known species of Paralomis is P. bouvieri, which has been discovered living at 4,152 m (13,622 ft).

== Taxonomy ==
Paralomis was described in 1856 by zoologist Adam White and named for its similarity to the genus Lomis. In 1895, marine biologist James Everard Benedict incorrectly placed Paralomis granulosa, the genus' type species, under the genus Lithodes. Benedict therefore dissolved the genus and created two now-defunct ones – Leptolithodes and Pristopus – for other members of Paralomis. Paralomis is closely related to Echidnocerus, and the monospecific genus Glyptolithodes – nested cladistically inside Paralomis – may simply be a species of Paralomis.

Paralomis contains over 70 species – more than any other king crab genus – and is the most morphologically diverse genus in the subfamily Lithodinae. It contains one fossil species, Paralomis debodeorum, which lived in New Zealand in the Middle–Late Miocene. Paralomis is distinguished from other king crabs by its abdominal segments: the second is undivided, and the third, fourth, and fifth are entirely calcified. Current scientific consensus is that Paralomis is monophyletic, although within this group, carcinologist Shane T. Ahyong in 2010 identified several informal subgroups of Paralomis. Paralomis' relationship to other king crabs can be seen in the following cladogram:

Lithodidae cladogram

- Lithodidae
  - - - - Paralithodes brevipes
        - - - - Paralomis/Glyptolithodes
                - - Glyptolithodes cristatipes
                  - - Paralomis zealandica
                    - Paralomis granulosa
                - - Paralomis dofleini
                  - - - - Paralomis pacifica
                        - Paralomis birsteini
                      - - Paralomis cristata
                        - Paralomis formosa
                    - - - - Paralomis multispina
                          - Paralomis hirtella
                        - Paralomis spinosissima
                      - - Paralomis erinacea
                        - - - Paralomis africana
                            - Paralomis cristulata
                          - - Paralomis anamerae
                            - - Paralomis aculeata
                              - Paralomis elongata
              - Echidnocerus
                - Echidnocerus cibarius
                - Echidnocerus foraminatus
            - - - Neolithodes
                  - Neolithodes diomedeae
                  - - Neolithodes brodiei
                    - - Neolithodes grimaldii
                      - - Neolithodes duhameli
                        - Neolithodes asperrimus
                - Lithodes
                  - - - Lithodes nintokuae
                      - - - Lithodes turkayi
                          - Lithodes longispina
                        - Lithodes murrayi
                    - Lithodes aequispinus
                  - - Lithodes couesi
                    - Lithodes turritus
                    - Lithodes paulayi
                    - Lithodes ferox
                  - - Lithodes maja
                    - - Lithodes santolla
                      - Lithodes confundens
              - Paralithodes platypus
            - Paralithodes camtschaticus
          - Phyllolithodes/Rhinolithodes
            - Phyllolithodes papillosus
            - Rhinolithodes wosnessenskii
        - Acantholithodes hispidus
        - Placetron wosnessenskii
      - Cryptolithodes
        - Cryptolithodes sitchensis
        - Cryptolithodes typicus
    - Hapalogaster
      - - Hapalogaster mertensii
        - Hapalogaster grebnitzkii
      - Hapalogaster dentata
  - Oedignathus inermis

== Species ==
Paralomis contains the following species:

Image	Scientific name	Common name	Distribution
	Paralomis aculeata Henderson, 1888		Southwest Indian Ridge
	Paralomis africana Macpherson, 1982		Namibia
	Paralomis alcockiana Hall & Thatje, 2009		
	Paralomis alis Ahyong, 2020		
	Paralomis anamerae Macpherson, 1988		Argentina, Crozet Island, South Georgia Island
	Paralomis arae Macpherson, 2001		
	Paralomis arethusa Macpherson, 1994		
	Paralomis aspera Faxon, 1893		
	Paralomis birsteini Macpherson, 1988		Southern Ocean near Scott Island
	Paralomis bouvieri Hansen, 1908		
	Paralomis ceres Macpherson, 1989		
	Paralomis chilensis Andrade, 1980		
	Paralomis cristata Takeda & Ohta, 1979		
	Paralomis cristulata Macpherson, 1988		
	Paralomis cubensis Chace, 1939		
	Paralomis danida Takeda & Bussarawit, 2007		
	Paralomis dawsoni Macpherson, 2001		New Caledonia, northern New Zealand, and the Solomon Islands
	Paralomis debodeorum Feldmann, 1998 †		New Zealand (Middle–Late Miocene)
	Paralomis diomedeae (Faxon, 1893)		
	Paralomis dofleini Balss, 1911		
	Paralomis echidna Ahyong, 2010		
	Paralomis elongata Spiridonov, Turkay, Arntz & Thatje, 2006		
	Paralomis erinacea Macpherson, 1988		
	Paralomis formosa Henderson, 1888		
	Paralomis gowlettholmes Ahyong, 2010		
	Paralomis granulosa (Hombron & Jacquinot, 1846)	False king crab, Chilean snow crab	Chile, Argentina, Falkland Islands
	Paralomis grossmani Macpherson, 1988		
	Paralomis haigae Eldredge, 1976		
	Paralomis hirtella de Saint Laurent & Macpherson, 1997		Lau Basin, North Fiji Basin
	Paralomis histrix (De Haan, 1849)		Japan (Tokyo Bay to Kyūshū)
	Paralomis hystrixoides Sakai, 1980		
	Paralomis inca Haig, 1974		
	Paralomis indica Alcock & Anderson, 1899		
	Paralomis investigatoris Alcock & Anderson, 1899		
	Paralomis jamsteci Takeda & Hashimoto, 1990		
	Paralomis japonica Balss, 1911		
	Paralomis kyushupalauensis Takeda, 1985		
	Paralomis longidactylus Birstein & Vinogradov, 1972		
	Paralomis longipes Faxon, 1893		
	Paralomis macphersoni Muñoz & García-Isarch, 2013		
	Paralomis makarovi Hall & Thatje, 2009		
	Paralomis manningi Williams, Smith & Baco, 2000	Deep-sea spider crab	West Coast of the United States
	Paralomis medipacifica Takeda, 1974		
	Paralomis mendagnai Macpherson, 2003		
	Paralomis microps Filhol, 1884		
	Paralomis multispina (Benedict, 1895)		
	Paralomis nivosa Hall & Thatje, 2009		
	Paralomis ochthodes Macpherson, 1988		Indonesia (Gulf of Boni)
	Paralomis odawarai (Sakai, 1980)		
	Paralomis okitoriensis Takeda, 2019		Okinotorishima
	Paralomis otsuae Wilson, 1990		
	Paralomis pacifica Sakai, 1978		
	Paralomis papillata (Benedict, 1895)		
	Paralomis papua Ahyong, 2020		
	Paralomis pectinata Macpherson, 1988		
	Paralomis phrixa Macpherson, 1992		
	Paralomis poorei Ahyong, 2010		
	Paralomis roeleveldae Kensley, 1981		
	Paralomis seagranti Eldredge, 1976		
	Paralomis serrata Macpherson, 1988		
	Paralomis sonne Guzmán, 2009		
	Paralomis spectabilis Hansen, 1908		Eastern Greenland, Iceland
	Paralomis spinosissima Birstein & Vinogradov, 1972		
	Paralomis staplesi Ahyong, 2010		Tasman Fracture, Tonga–Kermadec Ridge
	Paralomis stella Macpherson, 1988		
	Paralomis stevensi Ahyong & Dawson, 2006		
	Paralomis taylorae Ahyong, 2010		
	Paralomis truncatispinosa Takeda & Miyake, 1980		East China Sea, Taiwan
	Paralomis tuberipes Macpherson, 1988		Chile (Puerto Aguirre)
	Paralomis verrilli (Benedict, 1895)		
	Paralomis webberi Ahyong, 2010		New Zealand
	Paralomis zealandica Dawson & Yaldwyn, 1971	Prickly king crab	New Zealand
