= P. aspera =

P. aspera may refer to:

- Paralomis aspera, a species of king crab
- Patella aspera, a species of limpet in the family Patellidae
- Petrophile aspera, a species of flowering plant in the family Proteaceae
- Pipa aspera, the Albina Surinam toad, a species of frog in the family Pipidae
- Pomaderris aspera, hazel pomaderris, a species of flowering plant in the family Rhamnaceae
- Protea aspera, the rough leaf sugar bush, a species of flowering shrub in the family Proteaceae
- Pseudaneitea aspera, a species of land slug in the family Athoracophoridae
- Pterostylis aspera, the rough shell orchid, a species of orchid
