= P. longipes =

P. longipes may refer to:

- Panulirus longipes, the longlegged spiny lobster, a species of lobster in the family Palinuridae
- Paralomis longipes, a species of king crab
- Phacelia longipes, the longstalk phacelia, a species of plant in the family Boraginaceae
- Phalangipus longipes, a species of crab in the family Epialtidae
- Pectis longipes, the longstalk cinchweed, a species of plant in the family Asteraceae
- Philippodexia longipes, a species of fly in the family Tachinidae
- Phrynus longipes, a species of amblypygid in the family Phrynidae
- Pothos longipes, a species of climbing plant in the family Araceae
- Potorous longipes, a species of marsupial in the family Potoroidae
- Pristurus longipes, a species of lizard in the family Sphaerodactylidae
- Psathyrella longipes, the tall Psathyrella, a species of agaric fungus in the family Psathyrellaceae
- Pseudomaso longipes, a species of sheet weaver in the family Araneomorphae
