= Paralomis staplesi =

Conservation status
- Data Deficient (NZ TCS)

Scientific classification
- Domain: Eukaryota
- Kingdom: Animalia
- Phylum: Arthropoda
- Class: Malacostraca
- Order: Decapoda
- Suborder: Pleocyemata
- Infraorder: Anomura
- Family: Lithodidae
- Genus: Paralomis
- Species: P. staplesi

Binomial name
- Paralomis staplesi Ahyong, 2010

Species of king crab

Paralomis staplesi is a species of king crab. It has been found both south of Tasmania near the Tasman Fracture and on the Tonga–Kermadec Ridge from depths of 1,958–2,312 m (6,424–7,585 ft). It most closely resembles P. birsteini, P. stevensi, and P. gowlettholmes.

== See also ==
- List of crabs of New Zealand
