= Paralomis okitoriensis =

Scientific classification
- Domain: Eukaryota
- Kingdom: Animalia
- Phylum: Arthropoda
- Class: Malacostraca
- Order: Decapoda
- Suborder: Pleocyemata
- Infraorder: Anomura
- Family: Lithodidae
- Genus: Paralomis
- Species: P. okitoriensis

Binomial name
- Paralomis okitoriensis Takeda, 2019

Species of king crab

Paralomis okitoriensis is a species of king crab. It has been identified near Japan's southernmost atoll, Okinotorishima.

== Description ==
Paralomis okitoriensis is orange-red in colour with a pyriform carapace covered symmetrically in sharp tubercles on its dorsal surface. The carapace's edges, by contrast, feature sharp spines. The female holotype's carapace measures 44.2 mm (1.74 in) long and 43.5 mm (1.71 in) wide. Its chelipeds bear a mix of longer spines on the inner side and smaller ones on the outer side; the chelipeds, including the chelae, are "remarkably slender". The palms of its chelae are armed with spine-like tubercles tipped with tufts of setae, and its fingers are untoothed and heavily bristled. Its walking legs – also slender – are especially spinose. On its underside, its abdominal segments are well-developed; some are armed with tubercles, while others are smooth.

== Distribution ==
Location of Okinotorishima

Paralomis okitoriensis is known from only one female holotype found in January 2006 off Japan's southernmost atoll, Okinotorishima, at a depth somewhere between 900 and 1,500 m (3,000 and 4,900 ft). It was the 12th species of Paralomis described from Japanese waters.

== Taxonomy ==
Paralomis okitoriensis was described in 2019 by carcinologist Masatsune Takeda. Its name is a combination of the Japanese shorthand Oki-Tori for the Okinotorishima atoll where the holotype was found and the Latin suffix -ēnsis indicating 'of or from a place'. (Note: Lit. "Of/from Okinotorishima") It falls into an informal subgroup of Paralomis described by carcinologist Shane T. Ahyong which includes P. aculeata and P. spinosissima; this subgroup is characterized by its long chelipeds and walking legs as well as short, well-spaced tubercles on its carapace.
