= Paralomis diomedeae =

Scientific classification
- Kingdom: Animalia
- Phylum: Arthropoda
- Clade: Pancrustacea
- Class: Malacostraca
- Order: Decapoda
- Suborder: Pleocyemata
- Infraorder: Anomura
- Family: Lithodidae
- Genus: Paralomis
- Species: P. diomedeae

Binomial name
- Paralomis diomedeae (Faxon, 1893)

Synonyms
- Echinocerus diomedeae Faxon, 1893; Echidnocerus diomedeae Bouvier, 1896; Lopholithodes diomedeae del Solar, 1972

Species of king crab

Paralomis diomedeae is a species of king crab. It is considered very rare and is known from Peru, the Gulf of Panama, and Costa Rica's Pacific coast at depths of 680–935 m (2,231–3,068 ft).

== Description ==
Paralomis diomedeae has an approximately pentagonal carapace which is orange-red in colour and covered in tubercles. Carapace widths of P. diomedeae found in Peruvian waters during a 1997–1998 fishing expedition ranged from 74–164 mm (2.9–6.5 in) in males and 58–174 mm (2.3–6.9 in) in females.

== Taxonomy ==
Paralomis diomedeae was described in 1893 by carcinologist Walter Faxon as Echinocerus diomedeae, though he added it to Paralomis two years later in 1895. In 1896, Eugène Louis Bouvier returned it to its original genus (spelled "Echidnocerus" by him). In 1972, Enrique del Solar redesignated it Lopholithodes, as the name had priority over Echinocerus. In 1988, Enrique Macpherson moved the species back into Paralomis, calling it closely related to P. cristulata and specifically noting its "abdomen typical of the genus Paralomis".

== Works cited ==
- Faxon, Walter (1893). "Reports on the dredging operations off the west coast of Central America to the Galapagos, to the west coast of Mexico, and in the Gulf of California, in charge of Alexander Agassiz, carried on by the U.S. Fish Commission steamer "Albatross", during 1891, Lieut.-Commander Z.L. Tanner, U.S.N., commanding. VI. Preliminary descriptions of new species of Crustacea". Bulletin of the Museum of Comparative Zoology at Harvard College. 24 (7): 149–220 – via WoRMS.
- del Solar, Enrique M. (February 1972). Addenda al Catalogo de Crustaceos del Peru [Addendum to the Crustacean Catalog of Peru] (PDF) (Report) (in Spanish). Callao, Peru. hdl:20.500.12958/266.
- Haig, Janet (November 1974). "Observations on the lithodid crabs of Perú, with description of two new species" (PDF). Bulletin of the Southern California Academy of Sciences. 73 (3): 152–164. Archived (PDF) from the original on 26 November 2025 – via the Natural History Museum of Los Angeles County.
- Macpherson, Enrique (1988). "Revision of the family Lithodidae Samouelle, 1819 (Crustacea: Decapoda: Anomura) in the Atlantic Ocean" (PDF). Monografías de Zoología Marina (in English and Spanish). II: 9–153. ISSN 0213-4020. Archived (PDF) from the original on 14 May 2020 – via the Natural History Museum of Los Angeles County.
- Macpherson, Enrique; Wehrtmann, Ingo S. (February 2010). "Occurrence of lithodid crabs (Decapoda, Lithodidae) on the Pacific Coast of Costa Rica, Central America". Crustaceana. 83 (2): 143–151. doi:10.1163/001121609X12487811051660. JSTOR 20696253.
- Arguelles, J.; Larriviere, P.; Thatje, Sven; Pérez-Huaripata, Miguel (2020). "King Crabs of Peruvian Waters During 2003–2004: New Insights". In Hendrickx, Michel E. (ed.). Deep-Sea Pycnogonids and Crustaceans of the Americas. Springer. pp. 375–394. doi:10.1007/978-3-030-58410-8_16. ISBN 978-3-030-58409-2.
