= Pterostylis brevichila =

Dwarf shell orchid

Scientific classification
- Kingdom: Plantae
- Clade: Tracheophytes
- Clade: Angiosperms
- Clade: Monocots
- Order: Asparagales
- Family: Orchidaceae
- Subfamily: Orchidoideae
- Tribe: Cranichideae
- Genus: Pterostylis
- Species: P. brevichila

Binomial name
- Pterostylis brevichila D.L.Jones & C.J.French

Species of orchid

Pterostylis brevichila, commonly known as dwarf shell orchid, is a species of orchid endemic to the south-west of Western Australia. As with similar greenhoods, the flowering plants differ from those which are not flowering. The non-flowering plants have a rosette of leaves flat on the ground but the flowering plants have a single flower with leaves on the flowering spike. In this species, the flower is small and white with brown stripes and is similar to P. aspera but smaller in stature.

== Description ==
Pterostylis brevichila is a terrestrial, perennial, deciduous, herb with an underground tuber and when not flowering, a rosette of small leaves. There are often large colonies of plants having only leaf rosettes and no flowers. Flowering plants have a single white flower with brown stripes and 23–26 mm (0.9–1 in) long and 8–10 mm (0.3–0.4 in) wide on a flowering stem 60–120 mm (2–5 in) high. There are four or five stem leaves 10–25 mm (0.4–1 in) long and 4–5 mm (0.16–0.20 in) wide on the flowering stem. The dorsal sepal and petals are fused, forming a hood or "galea" over the column and the dorsal sepal has a short point. There is a small gap between the galea and the lateral sepals which have erect, thread-like tips 13–16 mm (0.5–0.6 in) long. The labellum is short, straight and not visible from outside the flower. Flowering occurs from July to September.

== Taxonomy and naming ==
Pterostylis brevichila was first formally described in 2012 by David Jones and Christopher French from a specimen collected near Scaddan and the description was published in Australian Orchid Review. The species had previously been known as Pterostylis sp. 'dwarf shell'. The specific epithet (brevichila) is derived from the Latin word brevis meaning "short" and the Ancient Greek word cheilos meaning "lip" referring to the short labellum.

== Distribution and habitat ==
Dwarf shell orchid grows in mallee woodland, often in melaleuca thickets, between Hyden and Mount Arid in the Cape Arid National Park in the Coolgardie, Esperance Plains and Mallee biogeographic regions.

== Conservation ==
Pterostylis brevichila is listed as "not threatened" by the Government of Western Australia Department of Parks and Wildlife.
