= P. spinosissima =

P. spinosissima may refer to:

- Paralomis spinosissima, a species of king crab
- Prunus spinosissima, the thorny almond, a species of wild almond
