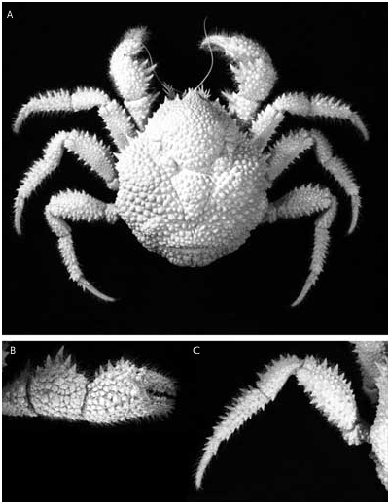

Conservation status
- Naturally Uncommon (NZ TCS)

Scientific classification
- Kingdom: Animalia
- Phylum: Arthropoda
- Class: Malacostraca
- Order: Decapoda
- Suborder: Pleocyemata
- Infraorder: Anomura
- Family: Lithodidae
- Genus: Paralomis
- Species: P. dawsoni

Binomial name
- Paralomis dawsoni Macpherson, 2001

= Paralomis dawsoni =

Species of king crab

Paralomis dawsoni is a species of king crab that lives in New Caledonia, northern New Zealand, and the Solomon Islands at depths of 400–1,118 m (1,312–3,668 ft). Alongside P. zealandica, it is one of the two most common species of Paralomis in New Zealand. As of 2023, the Department of Conservation in New Zealand classifies P. dawsoni as "Naturally Uncommon".

== Description ==
P. dawsoni is orange-red or red-brown in colour and has a subhexagonal carapace covered uniformly in blunt tubercles. Tubercles and coarse spines cover its legs, and its chelipeds are especially spinose. It is the largest species of Paralomis known to occur in New Zealand, with one specimen measured to have a post-pseudorostral carapace length of 142.7 mm (5.62 in) and a carapace width of 139.8 mm (5.50 in).

== Taxonomy ==
The species name "dawsoni" is dedicated to Elliot Watson Dawson of the National Museum of New Zealand.
