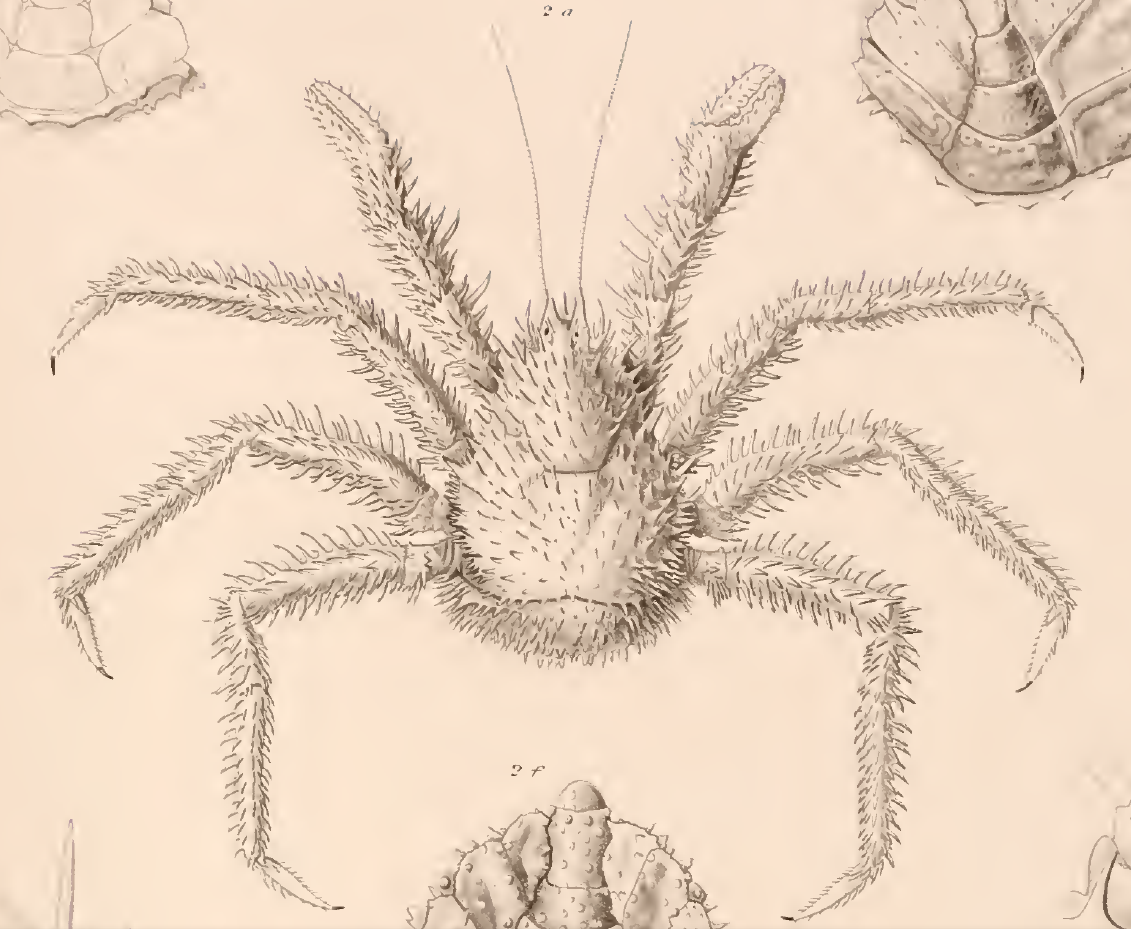

Scientific classification
- Kingdom: Animalia
- Phylum: Arthropoda
- Class: Malacostraca
- Order: Decapoda
- Suborder: Pleocyemata
- Infraorder: Anomura
- Family: Lithodidae
- Genus: Paralomis
- Species: P. bouvieri

Binomial name
- Paralomis bouvieri Hansen, 1908

= Paralomis bouvieri =

Species of king crab

Paralomis bouvieri is a species of king crab.

== Description ==
Paralomis bouvieri is mostly pale orange-red in colour except for the whitish underside of its coxae and the blackish-brown tips of its dactyli. It has a pentagonal carapace which is slightly longer than wide and is one of the smallest among Paralomis, being as large as 38.5 mm × 35 mm (1.52 in × 1.38 in) in a mature male and 34.8 mm × 34 mm (1.37 in × 1.34 in) in an ovigerous female. It most closely resembles Paralomis spinosissima from the South Atlantic – which is nearly twice as large.

== Distribution ==
Paralomis bouvieri is suspected to be rare and is distributed around the North Atlantic, likely continuously, being known from the waters of the United States, Canada, Greenland, Iceland, and southwestern Ireland. It has been found from depths of 889–4,152 m (2,917–13,622 ft), the latter being the deepest record of any king crab.

== Taxonomy ==
Paralomis bouvieri was described in 1908 by Hans Jacob Hansen from two specimens – one south of Iceland and one between Greenland and Iceland, both of which have since been lost. It is named for Eugène Louis Bouvier.

== Works cited ==
- Hansen, Hans Jacob (1908). Crustacea Malacostraca. (I.). The Danish Ingolf-Expedition. Vol. III. Copenhagen: H. Hangerup – via WoRMS.
- Macpherson, Enrique (May 1988). "Revision of the family Lithodidae Samouelle, 1819 (Crustacea: Decapoda: Anomura) in the Atlantic Ocean" (PDF). Monografías de Zoología Marina. II. ISSN 0213-4020. Archived (PDF) from the original on May 14, 2020 – via the Natural History Museum of Los Angeles County.
- Pohle, Gerhard W. (August 1992). "First Canadian record of Paralomis bouvieri Hansen, 1908 (Decapoda: Anomura: Lithodidae), infected by the rhizocephalan Briarosaccus callosus (Cirripedia: Peltogastridae) and carrying a hyperparasitic cryptoniscinid isopod (Epicaridea)". Canadian Journal of Zoology. 70 (8): 1625–9. Bibcode:1992CaJZ...70.1625P. doi:10.1139/z92-224 – via ResearchGate.
- Poore, Gary C. B.; Ahyong, Shane T. (2023). "Anomura". Marine Decapod Crustacea: A Guide to Families and Genera of the World. CRC Press. pp. 311–317. ISBN 978-1-4863-1178-1.
