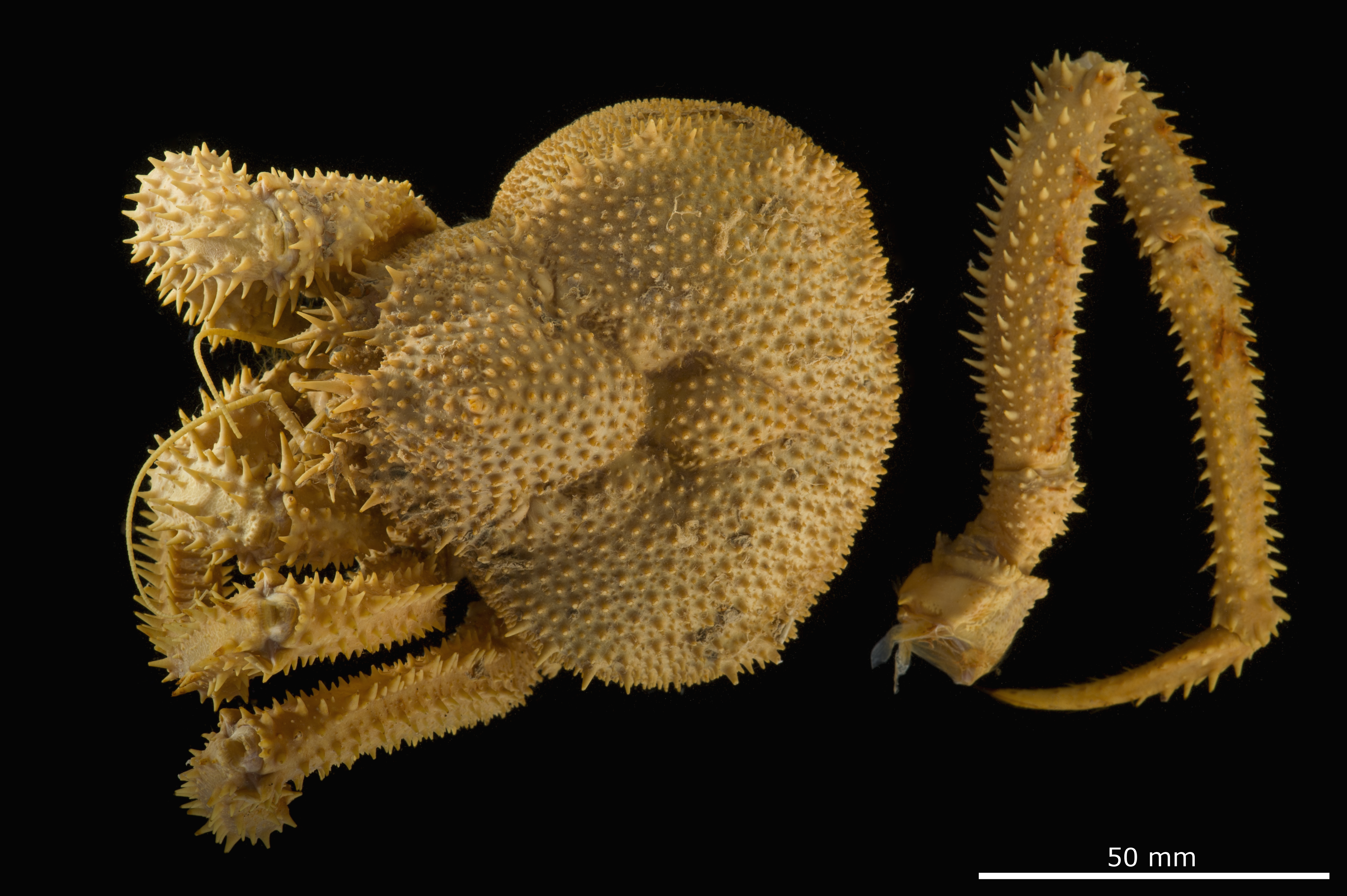

Scientific classification
- Kingdom: Animalia
- Phylum: Arthropoda
- Class: Malacostraca
- Order: Decapoda
- Suborder: Pleocyemata
- Infraorder: Anomura
- Family: Lithodidae
- Genus: Paralomis
- Species: P. multispina

Binomial name
- Paralomis multispina (Benedict, 1895)

Synonyms
- Leptolithodes multispinus Benedict, 1895; Leptolithodes multispina Rathbun, 1904

= Paralomis multispina =

Species of king crab

Paralomis multispina, also sometimes known as the Oregon hair crab (Note: Codified in Oregon law under OAR 635-005-0520.) and, in Japanese, エゾイバラガニ, is a species of king crab. It is red and covered in numerous spines, and it is found in the North Pacific from depths between 500–1,665 m (1,640–5,463 ft).

== Description ==
Paralomis multispina is red-to-pale-pink with numerous dark red spines. Juveniles have short, blunt tubercles which later grow into stout, conical spines seen in adults; both the tubercles and spines bear a halo of short setae.

P. multispina's rostrum consists of one median spine and a pair of basal spines. Its carapace is about as long as it is wide; a juvenile's carapace is between 7–30 mm (0.28–1.18 in) long, while those of adult females are known up to 93 mm (3.7 in) long and those of adult males up to 105 mm (4.1 in). Its chelipeds are slender, and its walking legs are elongate and cylindrical.

== Distribution ==
Paralomis multispina is known from depths between 500–1,665 m (1,640–5,463 ft) on muddy continental slopes and seamounts around the North Pacific, including Sagami Bay in Japan, the Bering Sea, and the Gulf of California. It is most common around Japan, where it has been found in cold seep communities.

From 2020–2021, a survey of a deep-sea (1,230 m (4,040 ft)) coral and sponge ecosystem off the coast of central California in Monterey Bay National Marine Sanctuary found that P. multispina accounted for 39% – a dominant plurality – of all observations of mobile macrofauna. More than half of these (51%) were on corals, and P. multispina showed no preference for substrate. P. multispina especially dominated other sightings during April and July–August 2020, and its abundance showed multiple cyclic patterns repeating every several days to a couple months. A study assessing the data concluded: "[P. multispina] may be a robust indicator of ecosystem health within [the sanctuary]."

== Taxonomy ==
Paralomis multispina was described as Leptolithodes multispinus in 1895 by marine biologist James Everard Benedict. The type specimens were taken from British Columbia off the Haida Gwaii archipelago at a reported depth of 876 fathoms (1,602 m; 5,256 ft). The following year, carcinologist Eugène Louis Bouvier contended that it belonged to the genus Paralomis and used the specific name "multispina". However, references to it as a member of the now-defunct Leptolithodes – under the name Leptolithodes multispina – continued into the early 1900s. By 1921, carcinologist Waldo L. Schmitt referred to it as Paralomis multispina in his treatment of marine decapods of California.

== Fisheries ==
Paralomis multispina sees little commercial exploitation. In Japan, notably Suruga Bay, a small P. multispina fishery uses basket nets and has little commercial value. In Russia, the central Sea of Okhotsk is largely inhospitable to P. multispina, and following a 2018 survey, Russia's VNIRO concluded that a P. multispina fishery in this sea is unviable.

In Alaska, as of 2011, a commissioner's permit to fish for P. multispina had not been issued since 1996, and no commercial harvest was reported in 1995. In British Columbia, P. multispina was caught as bycatch during a 1999–2000 investigation for the viability of a Chionoecetes tanneri fishery; 28 were caught from 5094 trap hauls, compared to 938 of another king crab, Lithodes couesi. In 1995, Oregon's Developmental Fisheries Board began issuing permits for small-scale pot fishing of P. multispina, L. couesi, and C. tanneri as a group. In 2002, three of the ten allowed permits were issued, and no P. multispina catch was documented.
