= P. histrix =

P. histrix may refer to:

- Paralomis histrix, a species of king crab
- Phryneta histrix, a species of beetle in the family Cerambycidae
- Potamotrygon histrix, the porcupine river stingray, a species of stingray in the family Potamotrygonidae
- Pseudacanthicus histrix, a species of armored catfish
