= Neolithodes asperrimus =

Scientific classification
- Kingdom: Animalia
- Phylum: Arthropoda
- Class: Malacostraca
- Order: Decapoda
- Suborder: Pleocyemata
- Infraorder: Anomura
- Family: Lithodidae
- Genus: Neolithodes
- Species: N. asperrimus

Binomial name
- Neolithodes asperrimus Barnard, 1947

Species of king crab

Neolithodes asperrimus, also known as the rough stone crab, is a species of king crab native to the west coast of Africa.

== Description ==
Neolithodes asperrimus has a dark red carapace, chelipeds, and walking legs, and its largest spines are typically bright red. It is covered in an even distribution of many large spines and small spicules. Males grow up to 195 mm (7.7 in) in length and up to 189 mm (7.4 in) in width. In females, this is 180 mm (7.1 in) and 156 mm (6.1 in), respectively, and ovigerous females are known to be 133 mm (5.2 in) or longer. Its rostrum usually extends beyond its eyes except in very large individuals. Its abdomen is covered with many spinules or spine-like granules, and the median plate of its second segment bears several well-developed spines.

== Distribution ==
Neolithodes asperrimus has been found from South Africa to Mauritania at depths of 997–1,862 metres (3,271–6,109 ft). Additionally, Neolithodes aff. asperrimus has been found in Madagascar and the South Region of Brazil.

== Taxonomy ==
Neolithodes asperrimus was described in 1947 by Keppel Harcourt Barnard from a male syntype and a female syntype found off Saldanha Bay and off Cape Point. Its specific name, asperrimus, derives from the Latin asper and -rimus, meaning "very thorny". It is closely related to N. agassizii from the West Atlantic and N. capensis from South Africa and the subantarctic, distinguished from the latter through features such as the small spinelets on its body. Two studies on the molecular phylogeny of king crabs show that N. asperrimus is most closely related to N. duhameli from the Crozet Islands.

== Ecology ==
Neolithodes asperrimus is known to be parasitised by Caprella urgulina, a species of Gammaridean amphipod. It is not targeted for commercial fishing but is occasionally caught in crab pots and bottom trawls as bycatch.
