= Paralomis tuberipes =

Scientific classification
- Kingdom: Animalia
- Phylum: Arthropoda
- Class: Malacostraca
- Order: Decapoda
- Suborder: Pleocyemata
- Infraorder: Anomura
- Family: Lithodidae
- Genus: Paralomis
- Species: P. tuberipes

Binomial name
- Paralomis tuberipes Macpherson, 1988

Species of king crab

Paralomis tuberipes is a species of king crab. It has been identified around Puerto Aguirre in Chile. Its depth range is unknown.

== Description ==
Paralomis tuberipes has a pentagonal carapace covered with granules. The female holotype's carapace measured 41 mm (1.6 in) long and 47 mm (1.9 in) wide, and its walking legs are as long or slightly longer than its carapace, giving it a legspan of approximately 120 mm (4.7 in). Its chelipeds have tubercles near the carapace, granules and rounded spines further down, and tufts of setae on the fingers of its chelae. Its walking legs feature long, rounded spines, with its slightly curved dactyli having smaller rounded spines and tufts of setae. On its underside, its abdominal segments are covered with small granules.

== Distribution ==
As of 2020, exactly one specimen of Paralomis tuberipes has been described, a female found in the Huichas Islands near Puerto Aguirre, Chile, in January 1945. Its depth was not recorded.

== Taxonomy ==
Paralomis tuberipes was described by carcinologist Enrique Macpherson in 1988. Its name is a combination of the Latin words "tuber" (referring to "tubercles") and "pes" ("foot"). (Note: Lit. "tuber foot")
