= Paralomis hirtella =

Conservation status
- Naturally Uncommon (NZ TCS)

Scientific classification
- Kingdom: Animalia
- Phylum: Arthropoda
- Class: Malacostraca
- Order: Decapoda
- Suborder: Pleocyemata
- Infraorder: Anomura
- Family: Lithodidae
- Genus: Paralomis
- Species: P. hirtella

Binomial name
- Paralomis hirtella de Saint Laurent & Macpherson, 1997

Species of king crab

Paralomis hirtella is a species of king crab. They are found around hydrothermal vents in the Lau Basin and the North Fiji Basin at depths around 1,750–2,000 m (5,740–6,560 ft). They are known to be parasitized by the Rhizocephala species Briarosaccus callosus.
