= Tasman Fracture Commonwealth Marine Reserve =

Australian marine protected area off south-west Tasmania

- IUCN category VI (protected area with sustainable use of natural resources)
- Location: Indian Ocean, Australia
- Nearest town: Melaleuca, Tasmania
- Coordinates: 44.83°S 144.81°E
- Area: 42,501 km^{2} (16,410 sq mi)
- Established: August 31, 2007
- Governing body: Parks Australia (Commonwealth of Australia)
- Website: environment.gov.au/topics/marine/marine-reserves/south-east/tasman-fracture

Tasman Fracture Commonwealth Marine Reserve is a 42,502 km^{2} marine protected area within Australian waters located off the coast of south-west Tasmania. It extends to the southerly limits of the Australian exclusive economic zone in the Indian Ocean and encompasses the Tasman Fracture. The reserve was established in 2007 and is part of the South-east Commonwealth Marine Reserve Network.

The reserve includes a number of undersea peaks rising to less than 1,500 m (4,900 ft) below the sea surface that provide habitat to deepwater hard corals. The reserve is also habitat to many seabirds, seals and cetaceans, such as dolphins and killer whales. The fauna of this reserve includes subantarctic fishes and seabed invertebrates. Biodiversity within the reserve is influenced by the most easterly extent of the Zeehan Current.

== Protection ==
Most of the Tasman Fracture marine reserve area is IUCN protected area category VI, however there are multiple zoned areas within the reserve with different protection classifications.

Zone	IUCN	Activities permitted			Area (km^{2})
Zone	IUCN	Recreational fishing	Commercial fishing	Mining	Area (km^{2})
Marine National Park	II	No	No	No	692
Special Purpose	VI	Yes	No	with approval	21,313
Multiple Use	VI	Yes	with approval	with approval	20 496
(Note: Summary of permitted activities only, see source for details)

== See also ==
- Commonwealth marine reserves
- Protected areas of Australia
- Southern Ocean
- Port Davey - nearby Tasmanian marine reserve within Southwest National Park
