= Paralomis truncatispinosa =

Scientific classification
- Domain: Eukaryota
- Kingdom: Animalia
- Phylum: Arthropoda
- Class: Malacostraca
- Order: Decapoda
- Suborder: Pleocyemata
- Infraorder: Anomura
- Family: Lithodidae
- Genus: Paralomis
- Species: P. truncatispinosa

Binomial name
- Paralomis truncatispinosa Takeda & Miyake, 1980

Synonyms
- Paralomis heterotuberculata Tung, Wang & Li, 1984

Species of king crab

Paralomis truncatispinosa is a species of king crab. It has been found both in the East China Sea and off the southern coast of Taiwan from depths of 642–1,062 m (2,106–3,484 ft).
