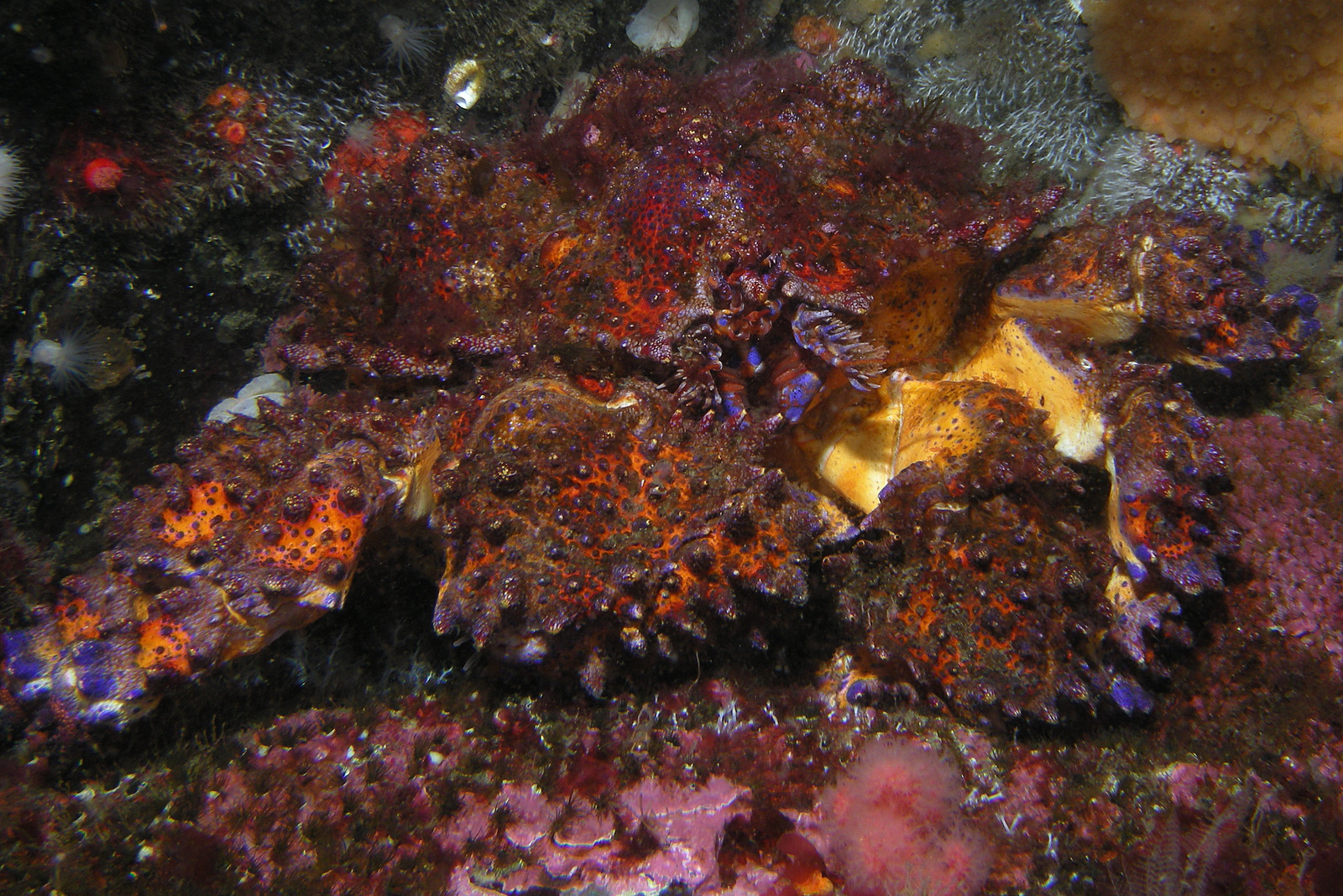

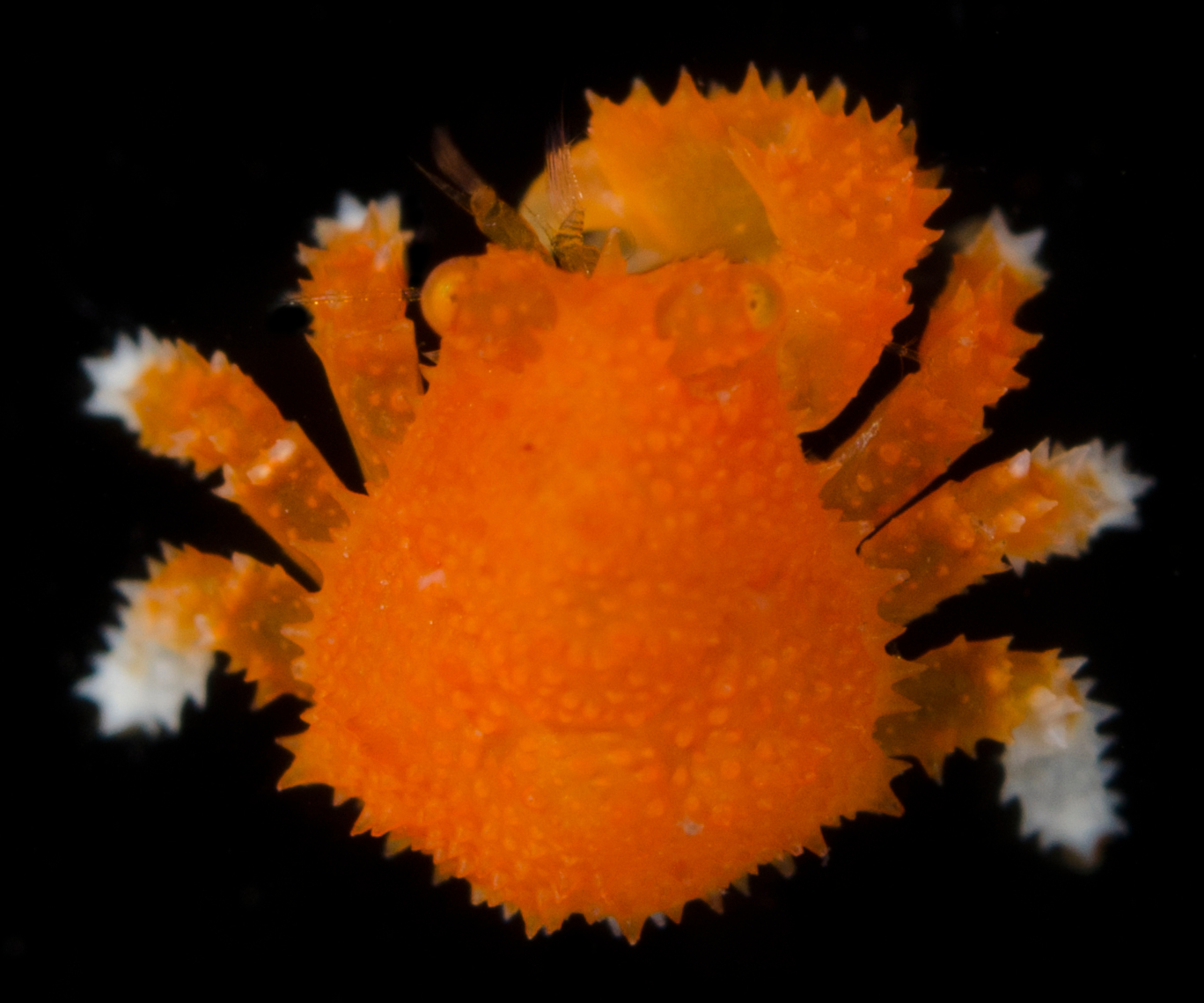
- Adult Echidnocerus cibarius (top) and juvenile (bottom)

Scientific classification
- Kingdom: Animalia
- Phylum: Arthropoda
- Class: Malacostraca
- Order: Decapoda
- Suborder: Pleocyemata
- Infraorder: Anomura
- Family: Lithodidae
- Genus: Echidnocerus
- Species: E. cibarius

Binomial name
- Echidnocerus cibarius White, 1842

Synonyms
- Lopholithodes mandtii

= Puget Sound king crab =

Species of king crab

The Puget Sound king crab (Echidnocerus cibarius), is a species of king crab which inhabits the oceans of the Pacific coast of North America from Alaska to central California. Adults are orange, red and purple in color, while juveniles are either mostly orange or have small blotches of red and purple. They can be recognized by their blunt bumps on their carapace. Puget Sound king crabs are larger than the similar brown box crab, with an average size of 6–10 inches (15–25 cm).

== Description ==
The Puget Sound king crab, which has the scientific name Echidnocerus cibarius, is an uncommon species of crab with distinct features that can be found on the West Coast of the United States; from Alaska to Central California. Juvenile Puget Sound king crabs are primarily orange with some patches of red and purple. As they grow into adulthood, the E. cibarius form a more mixed shell color of red, orange, and purple. They can also grow to be an average size of 6–10 inches (15–25 cm), with a carapace, or the dorsal side of the exoskeleton, growing upwards of 12 inches (30 cm) wide. This makes the Puget Sound king crab one of the largest crabs on the West Coast of the United States and yet it is still one of the hardest crab species to find. Another important characteristic of E. cibarius is the blunt, rounded bumps you will find all over them. Not only is this a necessary physiological trait that helps conceal the species in the subtidal, but the bumps also distinguish it from other closely related species, such as the brown box crab, Lopholithodes foraminatus, which has spinelike protrusions that are much sharper than the bumps on the Puget Sound king crab.

== Distribution and habitat ==
E. cibarius is distributed along the Pacific Coast of the United States and has moved, as observed, from as far as Montague Island, Alaska to Monterey, California. In these regions, the Puget Sound king crab lives in close proximity to many other closely related species, such as the Alaskan king crab. In these areas, E. cibarius are known to be found anywhere between the subtidal to depths of about 140 m. They mostly take up rocky areas where they can easily maneuver around and hide themselves from physical and ecological factors such as strong currents and drag that could rip other organisms away. Juvenile Puget Sound king crabs are more likely to be found under rocks at low tide in order to avoid heat stress. This makes them easier to find compared to adult Puget Sound king crabs which spend the majority of time at lower depths where there is a higher chance of catching prey. The exception to this is during the end of winter and beginning of spring when they come up to shallow waters in order to mate and breed offspring. As of recent, E. cibarius has become less common in the Puget Sound Straight region in Washington, USA. This is due to the shoreline modifications which negatively impact nearby habitats where various species, such as the Puget Sound king crab, coexist.

== Community impact and status ==
The Puget Sound king crab is known to live in the subtidal regions along coasts which means it is part of a diverse community of marine life that interact with each other to create a dynamic environment. This species is in a position where it must catch prey and avoid predators in order to survive and thrive. E. cibarius is known to consume sea urchins and other invertebrates, such as starfish and sea cucumbers. By controlling sea urchin populations, more seaweed and kelp will show up since there will be less invertebrates that consume those primary producers. In turn, the seaweeds and kelp conceal the Puget Sound king crab from its predators in the sky, such as pelicans and other birds that consume marine life. This is an example of a changing cycle within this community because a disturbance or change any species population could alter the rest of the community altogether. E. cibarius is becoming more uncommon in the areas it used to thrive in. Part of this is due to increased use of fishing nets of different sizes which the crabs get caught in and brought up. The Puget Sound king crab has been put on the protected species list by the Washington Fish and Wildlife Department which means it is not advised to catch and collect this species.

== Name ==
The Puget Sound king crab was, for a long time, known as Lopholithodes mandtii. However, in 2022, it was discovered that this was a junior synonym for Echidnocerus cibarius.

== See also ==
- Puget Sound
