= Paralomis sonne =

Scientific classification
- Kingdom: Animalia
- Phylum: Arthropoda
- Class: Malacostraca
- Order: Decapoda
- Suborder: Pleocyemata
- Infraorder: Anomura
- Family: Lithodidae
- Genus: Paralomis
- Species: P. sonne

Binomial name
- Paralomis sonne Guzmán, 2009

Species of crab

Paralomis sonne is a species of king crab known from the coast of northern Chile.

== Description ==
Paralomis sonne has a pyriform carapace which is slightly wider than it is long, and its entire body is covered in spinules.

== Distribution ==
Paralomis sonne has been found off the coast of Antofagasta, northern Chile, at depths of 1,775 m (5,823 ft).

== Taxonomy ==
Paralomis sonne was described in 2009 by marine biologist Guillermo Guzmán. The name "sonne" is taken from RV Sonne, the German research vessel whose crew originally found P. sonne off the coast of Chile in 2001.
