= Bounty Plateau =

Coordinates: 48°00′S 179°00′E

The Bounty Plateau is a small Oceanic plateau to the east of New Zealand. It lies below the Bounty Trough, and to the northeast of the Campbell Plateau. It is an area of shallower sea, from 600–1000m, except where the Bounty Islands protrude from it.

The crab species Paralomis zealandica is found there.
