= Paralomis ochthodes =

Scientific classification
- Kingdom: Animalia
- Phylum: Arthropoda
- Class: Malacostraca
- Order: Decapoda
- Suborder: Pleocyemata
- Infraorder: Anomura
- Family: Lithodidae
- Genus: Paralomis
- Species: P. ochthodes

Binomial name
- Paralomis ochthodes Macpherson, 1988

Species of king crab

Paralomis ochthodes is a species of king crab. It has been identified in the Gulf of Boni of the island Sulawesi in Indonesia. Its holotype's carapace measures 72 mm (2.8 in) long and 78 mm (3.1 in) wide, and it has been found at a depth of 1,281 m (4,203 ft). At the time of its discovery in 1988, it was the only member of Paralomis found in Indonesia.
