= Paralomis manningi =

Scientific classification
- Domain: Eukaryota
- Kingdom: Animalia
- Phylum: Arthropoda
- Class: Malacostraca
- Order: Decapoda
- Suborder: Pleocyemata
- Infraorder: Anomura
- Family: Lithodidae
- Genus: Paralomis
- Species: P. manningi

Binomial name
- Paralomis manningi Williams, Smith & Baco, 2000

Species of king crab

Paralomis manningi, known as the deep-sea spider crab, is a species of king crab. It has been found in the San Clemente Basin off the coast of Southern California at a depth of 1,922 m (6,306 ft) and off the coast of Oregon at a depth of 1,132 m (3,714 ft). It was originally associated only with a single deep-sea whale fall community.

== Description ==
Paralomis manningi thus far has only been described from two immature male specimens taken from the same site. These had a pentagonal carapace of length averaging 13.75 mm (0.54 in) and width averaging 12.15 mm (0.48 in). They were covered with small granules of various sizes and had small setae on their fingers, their dactyli, and at the prominences of their carapace.
