= Paralomis debodeorum =

Paralomis debodeorum Temporal range: Mid-Late Miocene

Scientific classification
- Kingdom: Animalia
- Phylum: Arthropoda
- Class: Malacostraca
- Order: Decapoda
- Suborder: Pleocyemata
- Infraorder: Anomura
- Family: Lithodidae
- Genus: Paralomis
- Species: P. debodeorum

Binomial name
- Paralomis debodeorum Feldmann 1998

Extinct species of king crab

Paralomis debodeorum is an extinct species of king crab that lived in New Zealand during the Middle–Late Miocene. (Note: The precise age of the Greta Siltstone where P. debodeorum was discovered is not known. Estimates range from the early Miocene to the Pliocene, and mid–late Miocene is used as "adopted age" until this range is refined.) It was discovered in the Greta Siltstone on Motunau Beach, North Canterbury, near the mouth of the Motunau River. It is a moderate-sized Paralomis and most closely resembles the extant Paralomis zealandica.

== Taxonomy ==
The species name "debodeorum" is from amateur fossil collectors John and Ann DeBode. It is the first and only lithodid in the fossil record.
