= Paralomis japonica =

Scientific classification
- Domain: Eukaryota
- Kingdom: Animalia
- Phylum: Arthropoda
- Class: Malacostraca
- Order: Decapoda
- Suborder: Pleocyemata
- Infraorder: Anomura
- Family: Lithodidae
- Genus: Paralomis
- Species: P. japonica

Binomial name
- Paralomis japonica Balss, 1911

Species of king crab

Paralomis japonica (Japanese: コフキエゾイバラガニ) is a species of king crab.
