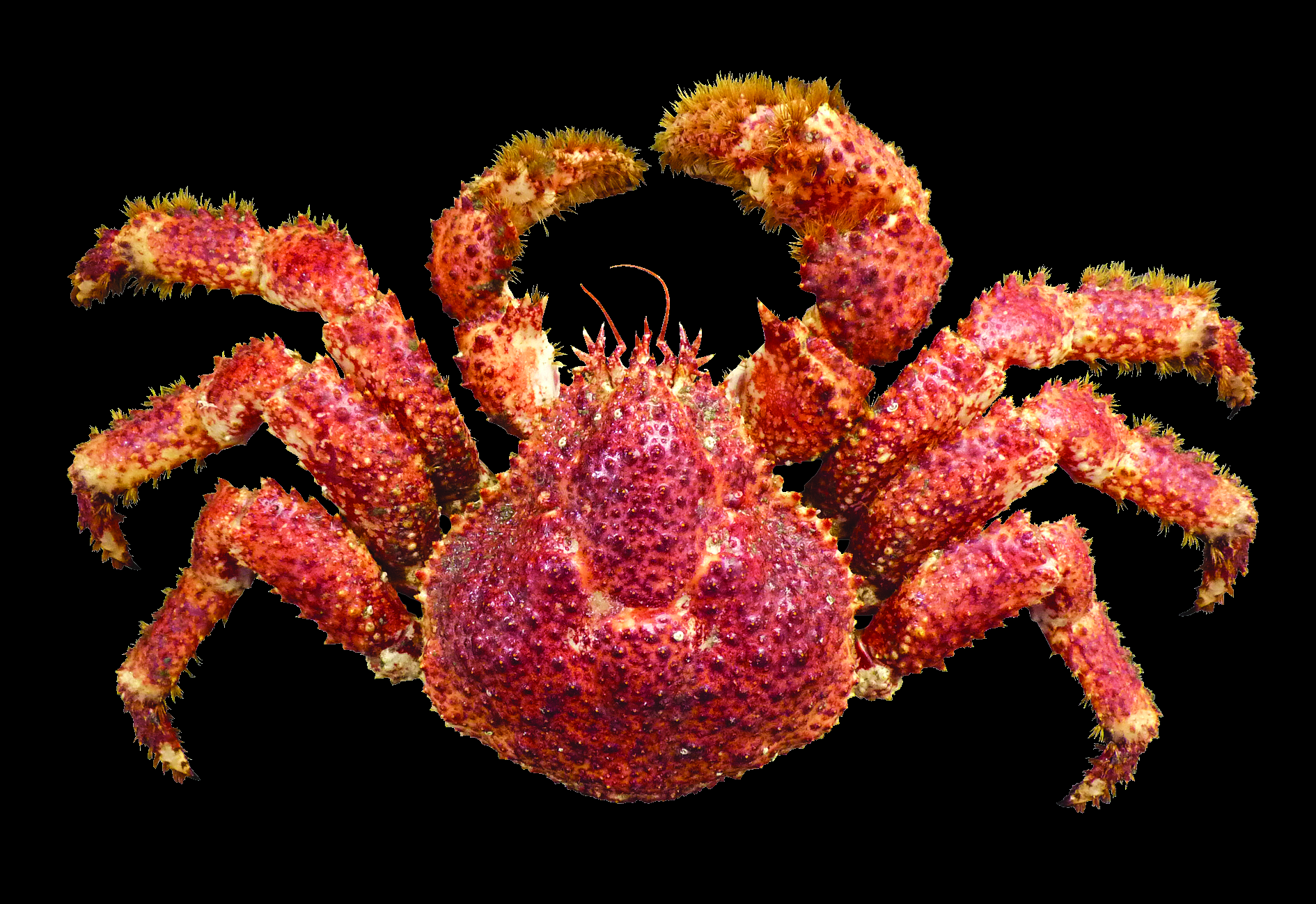

Scientific classification
- Domain: Eukaryota
- Kingdom: Animalia
- Phylum: Arthropoda
- Class: Malacostraca
- Order: Decapoda
- Suborder: Pleocyemata
- Infraorder: Anomura
- Family: Lithodidae
- Genus: Paralomis
- Species: P. granulosa

Binomial name
- Paralomis granulosa (Hombron & Jacquinot, 1846)

Synonyms
- Lithodes granulata Hombron & Jacquinot, 1846; Lithodes granulosa Hombron & Jacquinot, 1846; Lithodes verrucosa Dana, 1852

= Paralomis granulosa =

Species of king crab

Paralomis granulosa, also known as the false king crab, the Chilean snow crab, and centollón (Spanish), is a species of king crab. It lives around the southern tip of South America in Chile, Argentina, and the Falkland Islands. It is smaller than Lithodes santolla – a sympatric species of king crab – having a carapace length up to 115 mm (4.5 in), and weighing up to 1.5 kg (3.3 lb).
