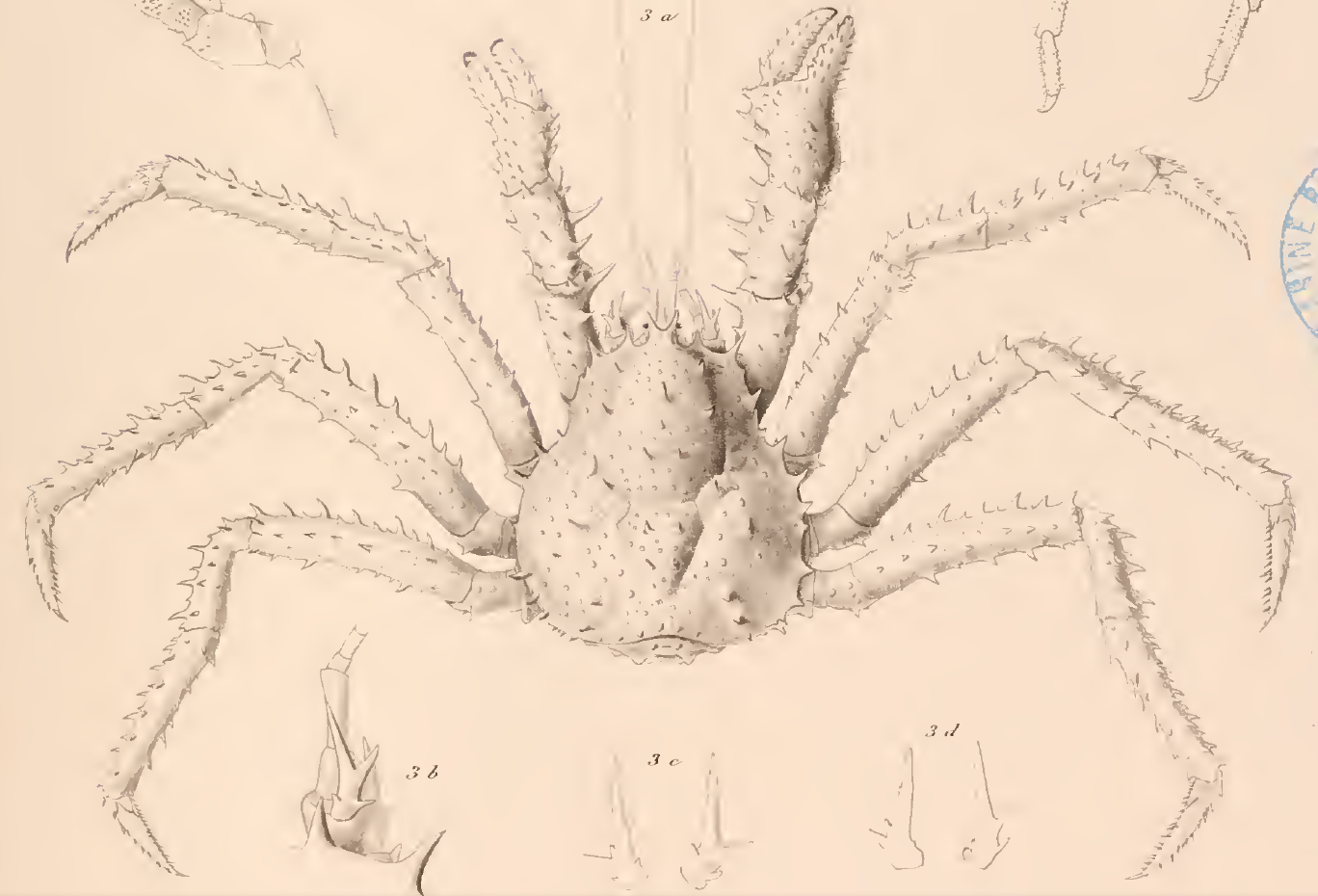
- P. spectabilis illustration by Hansen

Scientific classification
- Domain: Eukaryota
- Kingdom: Animalia
- Phylum: Arthropoda
- Class: Malacostraca
- Order: Decapoda
- Suborder: Pleocyemata
- Infraorder: Anomura
- Family: Lithodidae
- Genus: Paralomis
- Species: P. spectabilis

Binomial name
- Paralomis spectabilis Hansen, 1908

= Paralomis spectabilis =

Species of king crab

Paralomis spectabilis is a species of king crab. It has been found in Iceland and eastern Greenland from depths of 976–2,075 m (3,202–6,808 ft).
