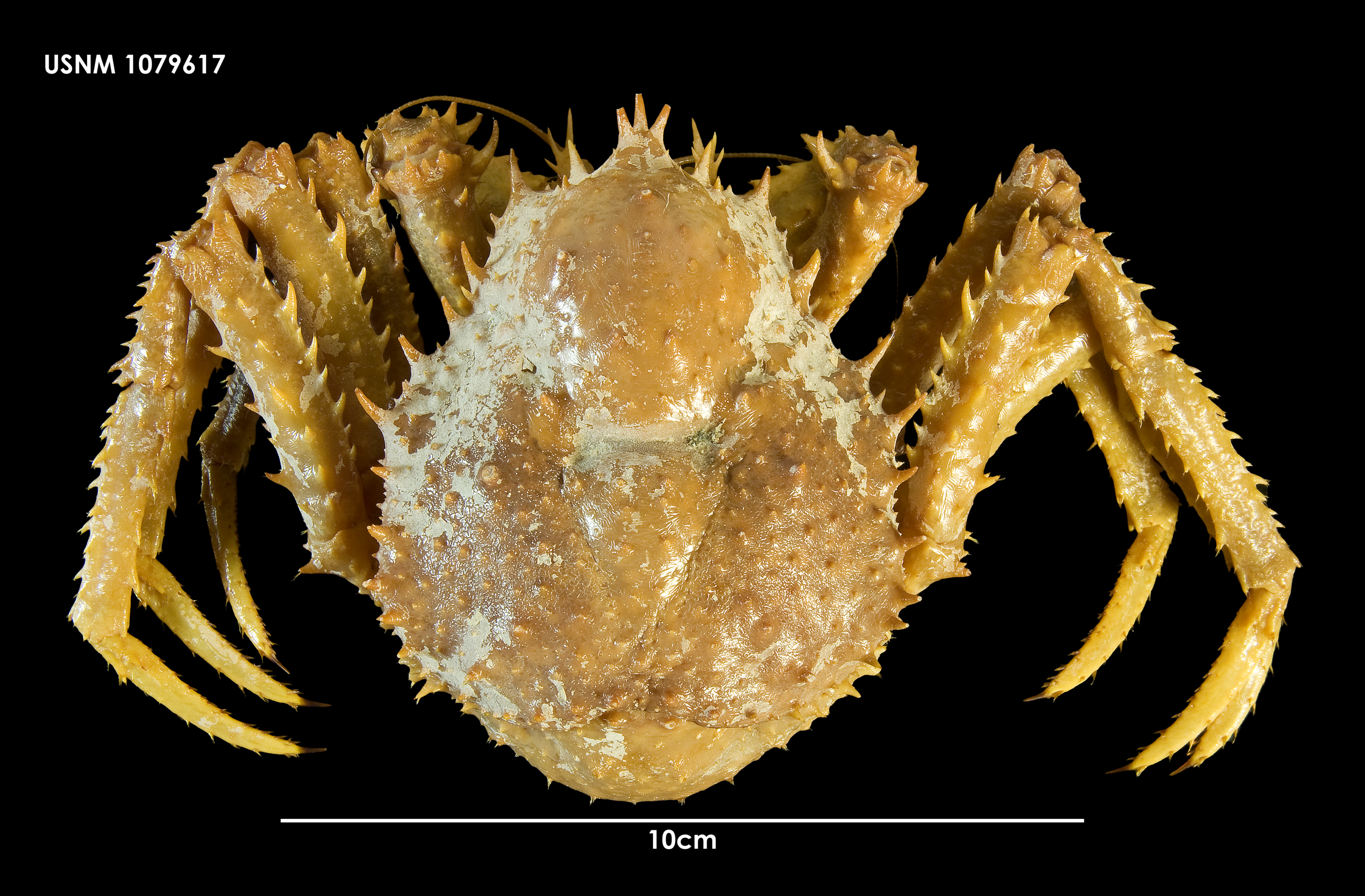
- Specimen from the Scotia Sea

Scientific classification
- Kingdom: Animalia
- Phylum: Arthropoda
- Class: Malacostraca
- Order: Decapoda
- Suborder: Pleocyemata
- Infraorder: Anomura
- Family: Lithodidae
- Genus: Paralomis
- Species: P. anamerae

Binomial name
- Paralomis anamerae Macpherson, 1988

= Paralomis anamerae =

Species of king crab

Paralomis anamerae is a species of king crab. It has been found north of the Falkland Islands off the coast of Argentina, near South Georgia Island in the south Atlantic Ocean, as well as off the coast of Crozet Island in the subantarctic Indian Ocean. Recorded depths range from 132–1,210 m (433–3,970 ft).
