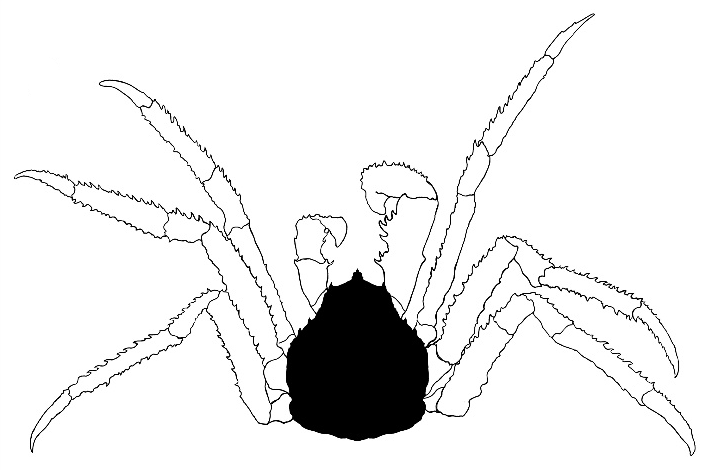

Scientific classification
- Kingdom: Animalia
- Phylum: Arthropoda
- Class: Malacostraca
- Order: Decapoda
- Suborder: Pleocyemata
- Infraorder: Anomura
- Family: Lithodidae
- Genus: Paralomis
- Species: P. serrata

Binomial name
- Paralomis serrata Macpherson, 1988

= Paralomis serrata =

Species of crab

Paralomis serrata is a species of king crab known from the Caribbean Sea.

== Description ==
Paralomis serrata has a pyriform carapace which is covered dorsally in rounded granules. From the center outward, the front edge of the carapace has a short, trifid rostrum whose median spine is horizontal; a pair of orbital spines whose extent is just short of the cornea; and a smaller pair of lateral spines. Behind the rostrum, the gastric region is highly pronounced, and the triangular cardiac region behind that is smaller than the gastric and branchial regions. Like the dorsal carapace, the abdomen is covered in granules. The male holotype's carapace measures 106 mm (4.2 in) long and 112 mm (4.4 in) wide.

The walking legs are long and slender, with the third pair being the shortest at 2.7 times the carapace length. The anterior and posterior edges of the merus, carpus, and propodus feature a row of spines – referenced in P. serrata's name – and the slightly curved anterior edge of the dactylus features two parallel rows of setae tufts. The merus and carpus of the chelipeds are sparsely granular and have several spines which are found mostly on the dorsal side. The palms are spinose on the dorsal surface and granular elsewhere, and the fingers are densely covered in setae tufts.

== Distribution ==
Paralomis serrata is known from the Caribbean Sea off the coast of Colombia at a depth of 1,100 m (3,600 ft).

== Taxonomy ==
Paralomis serrata was described by carcinologist Enrique Macpherson in 1988. The specific name "serrata" – being derived from "serra", Latin for "saw" – refers to the sawtooth-like row of spines on the walking legs. It is distinguished from its closest relative – P. pectinata from near Margarita Island – through the pyriform shape of its carapace and the subtlety of the crests near its posterior and on its chelipeds. It also resembles P. verrilli from the North Pacific, but among other distinguishing features, P. serrata entirely lacks a prominent crest found on the posterolateral edge of P. verrilli's carapace.
