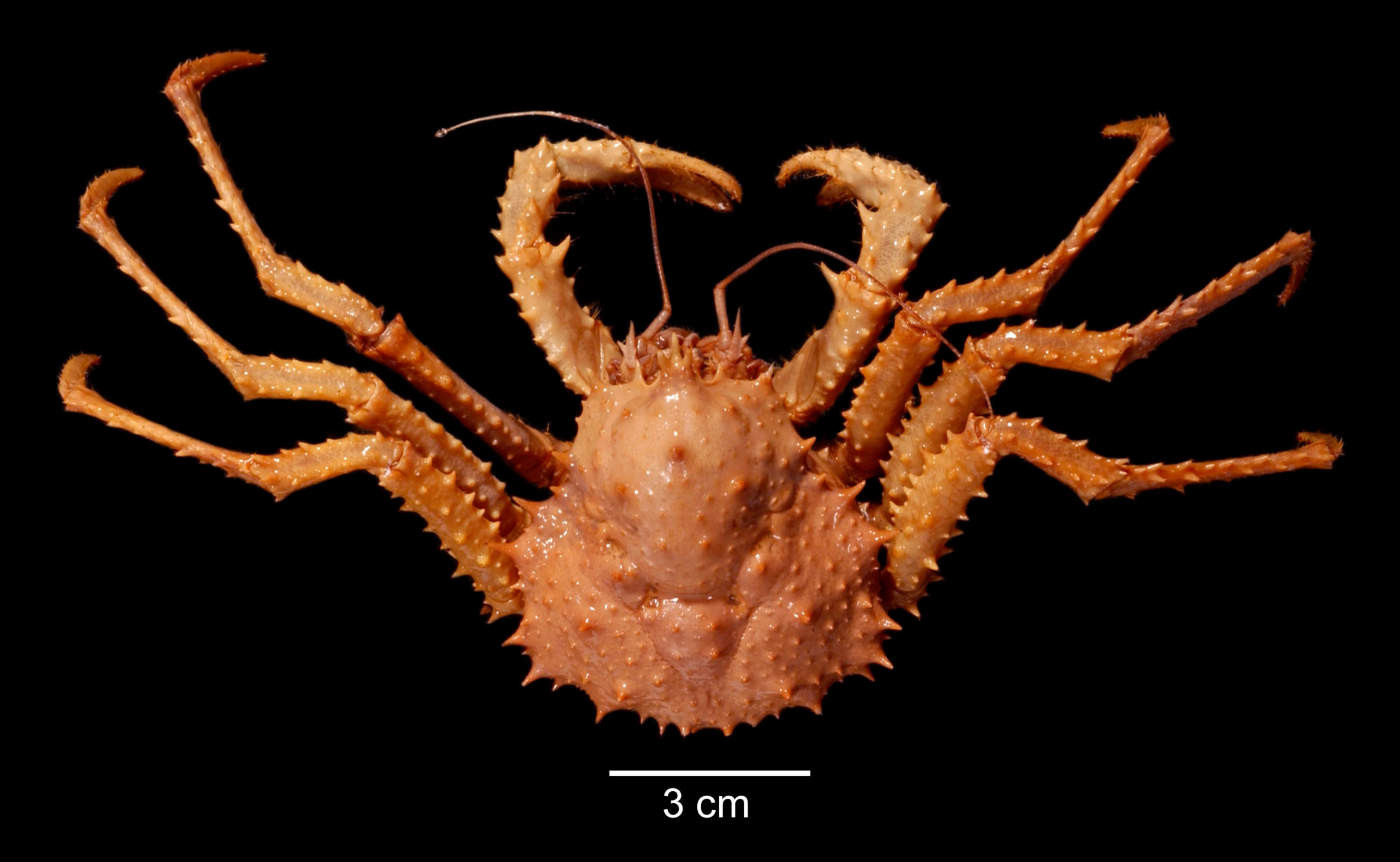

Scientific classification
- Kingdom: Animalia
- Phylum: Arthropoda
- Clade: Pancrustacea
- Class: Malacostraca
- Order: Decapoda
- Suborder: Pleocyemata
- Infraorder: Anomura
- Family: Lithodidae
- Genus: Paralomis
- Species: P. birsteini

Binomial name
- Paralomis birsteini Macpherson, 1988

= Paralomis birsteini =

Species of king crab

Paralomis birsteini is a species of king crab. It has been found in the Southern Ocean near Scott Island at depths of 500–1,876 m (1,640–6,155 ft).
