= Pseudomaso =

Scientific classification
- Kingdom: Animalia
- Phylum: Arthropoda
- Subphylum: Chelicerata
- Class: Arachnida
- Order: Araneae
- Infraorder: Araneomorphae
- Family: Linyphiidae
- Genus: Pseudomaso; Locket & Russell-Smith, 1980
- Species: P. longipes

Binomial name
- Pseudomaso longipes Locket & Russell-Smith, 1980

Genus of spiders

Pseudomaso is a monotypic genus of West African sheet weavers containing the single species, Pseudomaso longipes. It was first described by G. H. Locket & A. Russell-Smith in 1980, and has only been found in Nigeria.
