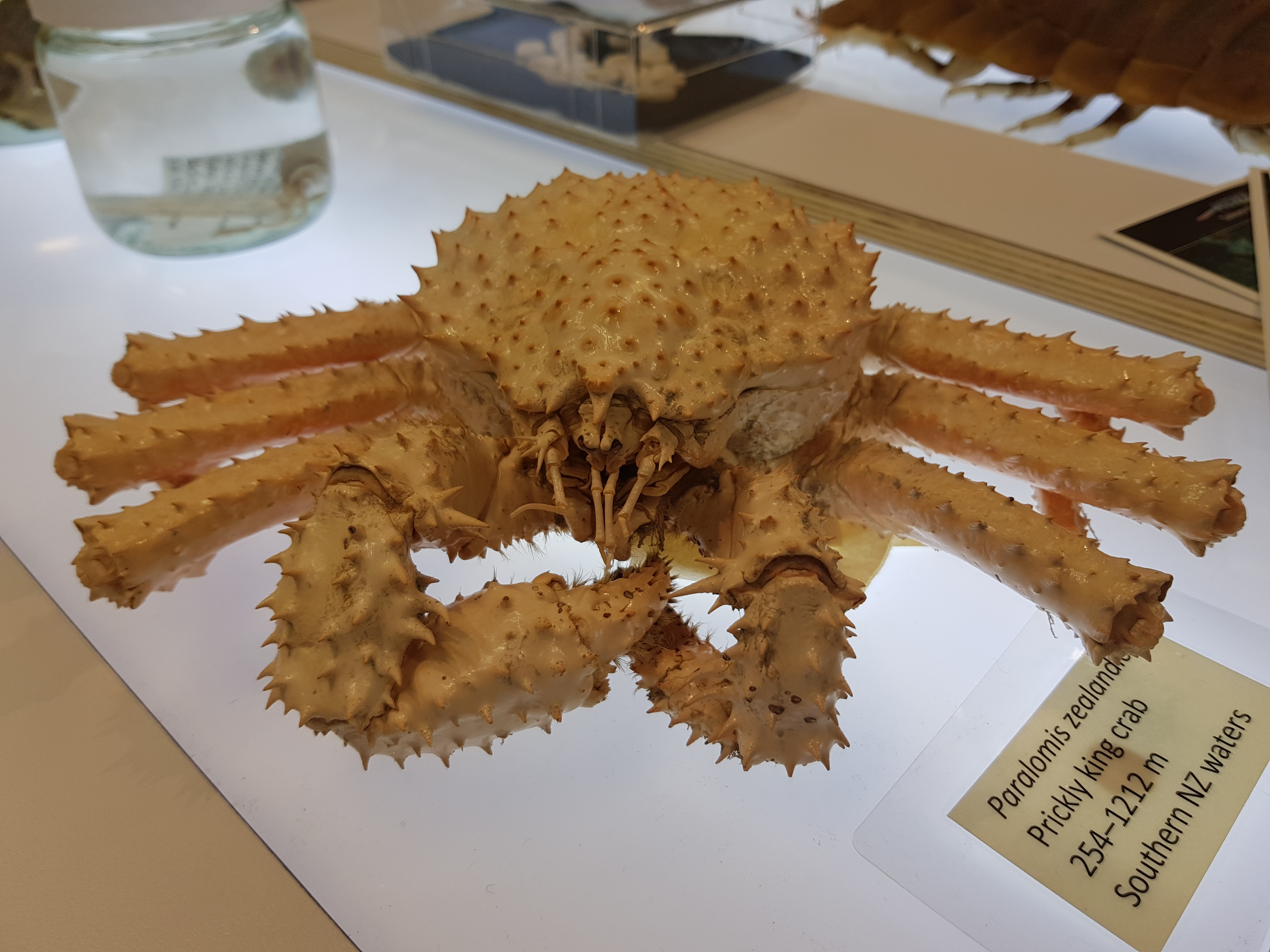

Conservation status
- Naturally Uncommon (NZ TCS)

Scientific classification
- Kingdom: Animalia
- Phylum: Arthropoda
- Clade: Pancrustacea
- Class: Malacostraca
- Order: Decapoda
- Suborder: Pleocyemata
- Infraorder: Anomura
- Family: Lithodidae
- Genus: Paralomis
- Species: P. zealandica

Binomial name
- Paralomis zealandica Dawson & Yaldwyn, 1971

Synonyms
- Paralomis shinkaimaruae Takeda & Hatanaka, 1984

= Paralomis zealandica =

Species of king crab

Paralomis zealandica, also known as the prickly king crab, is a species of king crab. It is the most widespread species of Paralomis in New Zealand, where it is endemic and known at depths between 254–1,212 m (833–3,976 ft).

== Description ==
Paralomis zealandica has a pyriform carapace which is pear-shaped with a width to 13 cm and 0.90–1.05 times as long as it is wide. Attached to the underside of this carapace are four pairs of walking legs; however, the fourth pair is reduced and gathers up under the carapace in the gill chamber. The reduced fourth leg pair means the king crabs are not true crabs, similar to hermit crabs. Along with the legs, also known as pereiopods, these crustaceans have one pair of claws, also known as chelipeds. They have an exoskeleton as well as apposition eyes (a type of compound eye).

Their overall colour is ivory-white with the exception of the red-orange found on the spines of the dorsal carapace and in blotches on the legs. The carapace, chelipeds, walking legs, and abdomen are all densely covered in spines, although the dorsal spines eventually reduce to tubercles in adults. These sharp spines are longer and curved on juveniles while short upright and strong on adults. Additionally, prickly king crabs have a rostrum composed of three short, sharp and strong spines. Their body length is 78.5 mm but can grow to 137.8 mm.

== Distribution ==
Paralomis zealandica is known to be found throughout eastern, central, and southern New Zealand waters only, where its known range extends from the Chatham Rise and Cook Strait down to the Bounty and Campbell Plateaus. This means that it has one of the widest distributions of Paralithodes. It is usually found on fine sand and mud bottoms at depths of approximately 500–700 m (1,600–2,300 ft), but its full known range is 254–1,212 m (833–3,976 ft). The habitat preference for this species is marine benthic.

== Taxonomy ==
Paralomis zealandica was described in 1971 by Elliot Watson Dawson and John C. Yaldwyn. The specific name "zealandica" derives from the type locality of New Zealand.

== Diet and foraging ==
Paralomis species are omnivorous benthic feeders, eating organisms such as hydrozoans, echinoderms, and foraminiferans. Paralomis species have been known to eat other hard-bodied invertebrates. Lithodids, particularly deep-sea king crabs, are adapted to cold environments with limited food resources and therefore they are scavengers that feed opportunistically in order to conserve energy. They have a lecithotrophic feeding mode in which larvae feed on yolk reserves.

== Predators, parasites and diseases ==
Rhizocephalan barnacle parasites can infect various king crab species, which root and can cause impacts on host hemolymph, reductions in growth, feminization of male hosts, and alternations in host behaviour. Hematodinium, which are parasitic dinoflagellates, can infect lithodid crabs, causing bitter crab disease which is typically fatal. Due to their spiny exoskeleton and deep sea habitation, there are few predators that prey on adult lithodid crabs; however, there are some records of king crabs being preyed upon by large demersal fish (fish that inhabit waters near the sea floor), particularly at juvenile life stages.

== Life cycle / phenology ==
King crabs, such as prickly king crabs, initially hatch from eggs and begin a planktonic larval stage of life in which they drift through the ocean currents. After the larval stage they go through settlement, moving from the water column to their benthic habitat, and metamorphosis, during which a structural molt takes place transforming the individual from the larval form to a juvenile crab. Crustaceans molt throughout their lives, which provides an opportunity to replace their ridged exoskeleton to allow for body growth and healing. Their growth can be measures in two principal manners, by the intermolt periods (IP), the length of time between molts, and molt increments (MI), the overall increase in size including length and weight after an old exoskeleton is shed.

King crabs are overall slow to mature. King crabs can become sexually mature depending on the species from around four to nine years after settlement, concluding the juvenile life stage and beginning the adult stage of their lifecycle. When ready to breed, female king crabs attract male king crabs by emitting a chemical stimulant. Once a male king crab finds a female, he will utilize the precopulatory embrace, during which he uses his chelipeds to hold onto the female's meropodite, facing them towards each other, before and while she molts for three to seven days. This act may have many benefits, such as providing protection to the female while vulnerable during molting and keeping the sexually mature individuals together.

When the female is done molting, and the ridged exoskeleton is no longer acting as a physical barrier, the male is now able to use his fifth pair of tucked pereopods to rub sperm on the females pleopods as she releases her eggs, effectively fertilizing the eggs. The eggs stick to the hairs on the females pleopods, remaining there for approximately 11 moths after mating until they hatch. The average lifespan of king crabs is also variable based on species; however, it tends to be roughly 20 to 30 years.

== Additional information ==
Prickly king crabs are sexually dimorphic as females have round and asymmetrical abdomens while males have triangular and symmetrical abdomens. This species moves through drag-powered swimming, which is a form of locomotion in which an individuals appendages act as paddles that stroke to move water back and propel themselves forward. The prickly king crab has a mineralized exoskeleton containing calcium phosphate. The prickly king crab conservation status is naturally uncommon, meaning it has a naturally small population and a limited distribution but is not necessarily threatened by human activity. It is also interesting to note that, like other crabs, prickly king crabs have a protein that contains copper, hemocyanin, which transports oxygen in their bodies similarly to how the iron in blood does in humans, making their hemolymph (analogous to blood) distinctively blue in the presence of oxygen.

== See also ==
- Paralomis debodeorum, an extinct species which closely resembles P. zealandica
- List of crabs of New Zealand § Anomura
