= Paralomis longidactylus =

Scientific classification
- Domain: Eukaryota
- Kingdom: Animalia
- Phylum: Arthropoda
- Class: Malacostraca
- Order: Decapoda
- Suborder: Pleocyemata
- Infraorder: Anomura
- Family: Lithodidae
- Genus: Paralomis
- Species: P. longidactylus

Binomial name
- Paralomis longidactylus Birstein & Vinogradov, 1972

Species of king crab

Paralomis longidactylus is a species of king crab.
