= Paralomis aspera =

Scientific classification
- Kingdom: Animalia
- Phylum: Arthropoda
- Clade: Pancrustacea
- Class: Malacostraca
- Order: Decapoda
- Suborder: Pleocyemata
- Infraorder: Anomura
- Family: Lithodidae
- Genus: Paralomis
- Species: P. aspera

Binomial name
- Paralomis aspera Faxon, 1893

Synonyms
- Leptolithodes asper

Species of crab

Paralomis aspera is a species of king crab.

== Description ==
Paralomis aspera has a pentagonal carapace which is as wide as it is long – the female holotype's measuring 113 mm (4.4 in) long and 113 mm (4.4 in) wide. Its rostrum is short (Note: 9 mm (0.35 in) in the female holotype) and comprises three spines, and the gastric, cardiac, and branchial regions of the carapace are prominent and well-defined. Both the carapace and abdomen are thickly covered with tubercles, each of which are surrounded by a ring of setae. Its chelipeds are densely spinose, and the right is more robust than the left. Its walking legs – long and robust, the rearmost pair measuring 255 mm (10.0 in) in the female holotype – are similarly spinose.

== Distribution ==
Paralomis aspera has been found off Colombia and Peru at depths ranging from 560–1,270 m (1,840–4,170 ft).

== Taxonomy ==
Paralomis aspera was described in 1893 by American carcinologist Walter Faxon.

== Works cited ==
- Faxon, Walter (1893). "Reports on the dredging operations off the west coast of Central America to the Galapagos, to the west coast of Mexico, and in the Gulf of California, in charge of Alexander Agassiz, carried on by the U.S. Fish Commission steamer "Albatross", during 1891, Lieut. Commander Z.L. Tanner, U.S.N., commanding. VI. Preliminary descriptions of new species of Crustacea". Bulletin of the Museum of Comparative Zoology at Harvard College. 24 (7): 149–220 – via WoRMS.
- Haig, Janet (November 1974). "Observations on the lithodid crabs of Perú, with description of two new species" (PDF). Bulletin of the Southern California Academy of Sciences. 73 (3): 152–164 – via the Natural History Museum of Los Angeles County.
