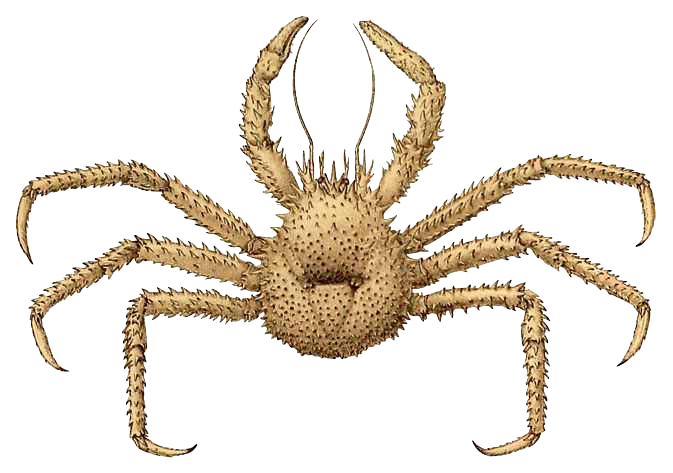
- Male holotype of P. aculeata figured by Henderson in 1888

Scientific classification
- Kingdom: Animalia
- Phylum: Arthropoda
- Class: Malacostraca
- Order: Decapoda
- Suborder: Pleocyemata
- Infraorder: Anomura
- Family: Lithodidae
- Genus: Paralomis
- Species: P. aculeata

Binomial name
- Paralomis aculeata Henderson, 1888

Synonyms
- Paralomis aculeatus Henderson, 1888

= Paralomis aculeata =

Species of king crab

Paralomis aculaeta is a species of king crab described from the male holotype found off the coast of Prince Edward Island, a sub-Antarctic island, by J.R. Henderson on HMS Challenger in 1888. Its carapace was first described as having a width of 39 mm and length of 42 mm. It is distributed in the western outreach of the Southwest Indian Ridge. The crab is caught during bottom trawling for Lepidonotothen squamifrons, at a frequency of 25–30%.
