= Paralomis longipes =

Scientific classification
- Kingdom: Animalia
- Phylum: Arthropoda
- Clade: Pancrustacea
- Class: Malacostraca
- Order: Decapoda
- Suborder: Pleocyemata
- Infraorder: Anomura
- Family: Lithodidae
- Genus: Paralomis
- Species: P. longipes

Binomial name
- Paralomis longipes Faxon, 1893

Synonyms
- Leptolithodes longipes Faxon 1895

Species of crab

Paralomis longipes is a species of king crab.

== Taxonomy ==
Paralomis longipes was described by carcinologist Walter Faxon in 1893.
