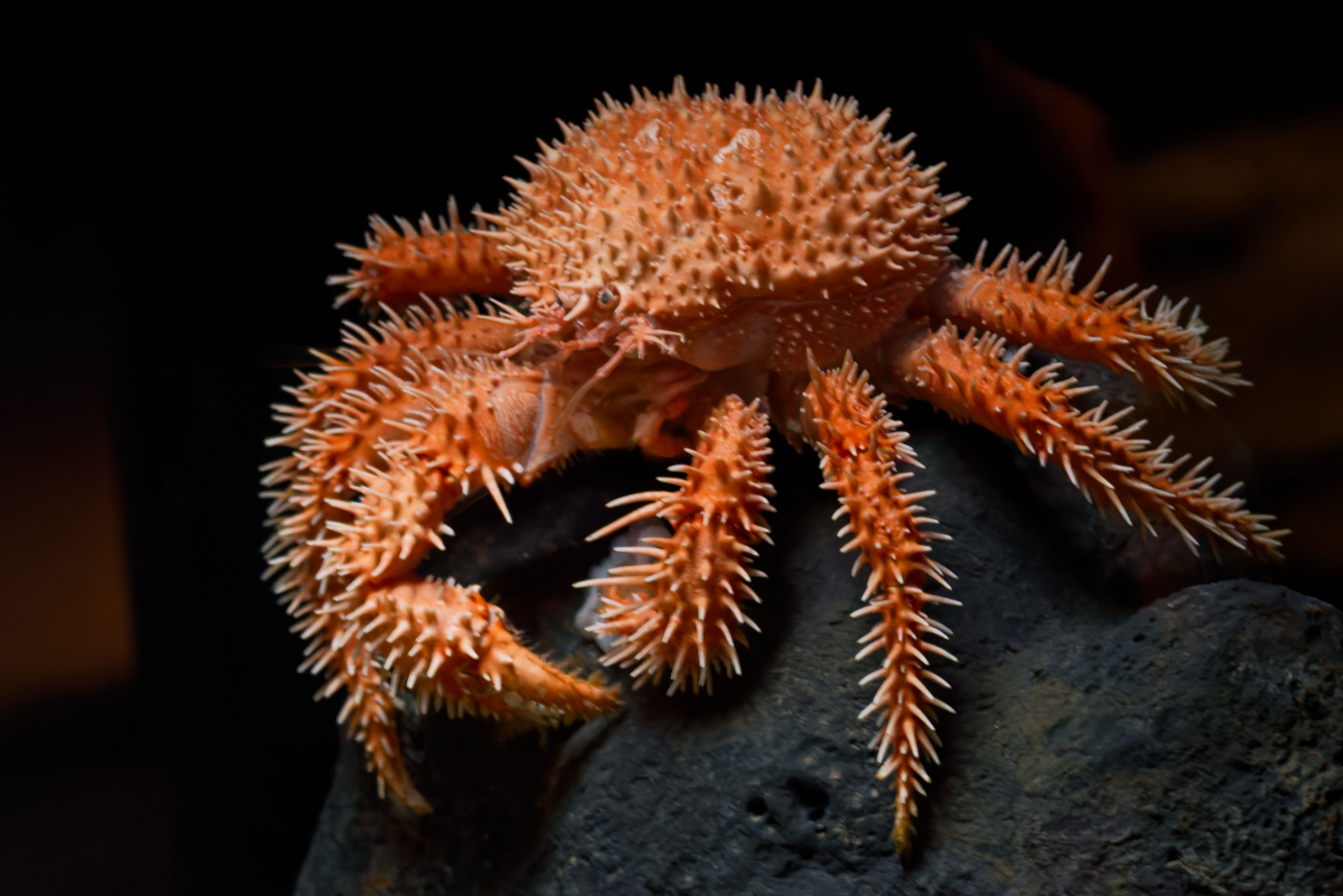

Scientific classification
- Kingdom: Animalia
- Phylum: Arthropoda
- Clade: Pancrustacea
- Class: Malacostraca
- Order: Decapoda
- Suborder: Pleocyemata
- Infraorder: Anomura
- Family: Lithodidae
- Genus: Paralomis
- Species: P. histrix

Binomial name
- Paralomis histrix (De Haan, 1849)

Synonyms
- Paralomis hystrix Lithodes histrix (basionym)

= Japanese porcupine crab =

Species of king crab

The Japanese porcupine crab (Paralomis histrix) is a species of king crab. It lives at a depth of 180–400 m (590–1,310 ft) in Tokyo Bay, Enshunada and through to Kyūshū. It has few predators because of its size and spiky carapace. It is sometimes kept in public aquariums and is occasionally referred to as the porcupine crab, a name otherwise used for Neolithodes grimaldii.
