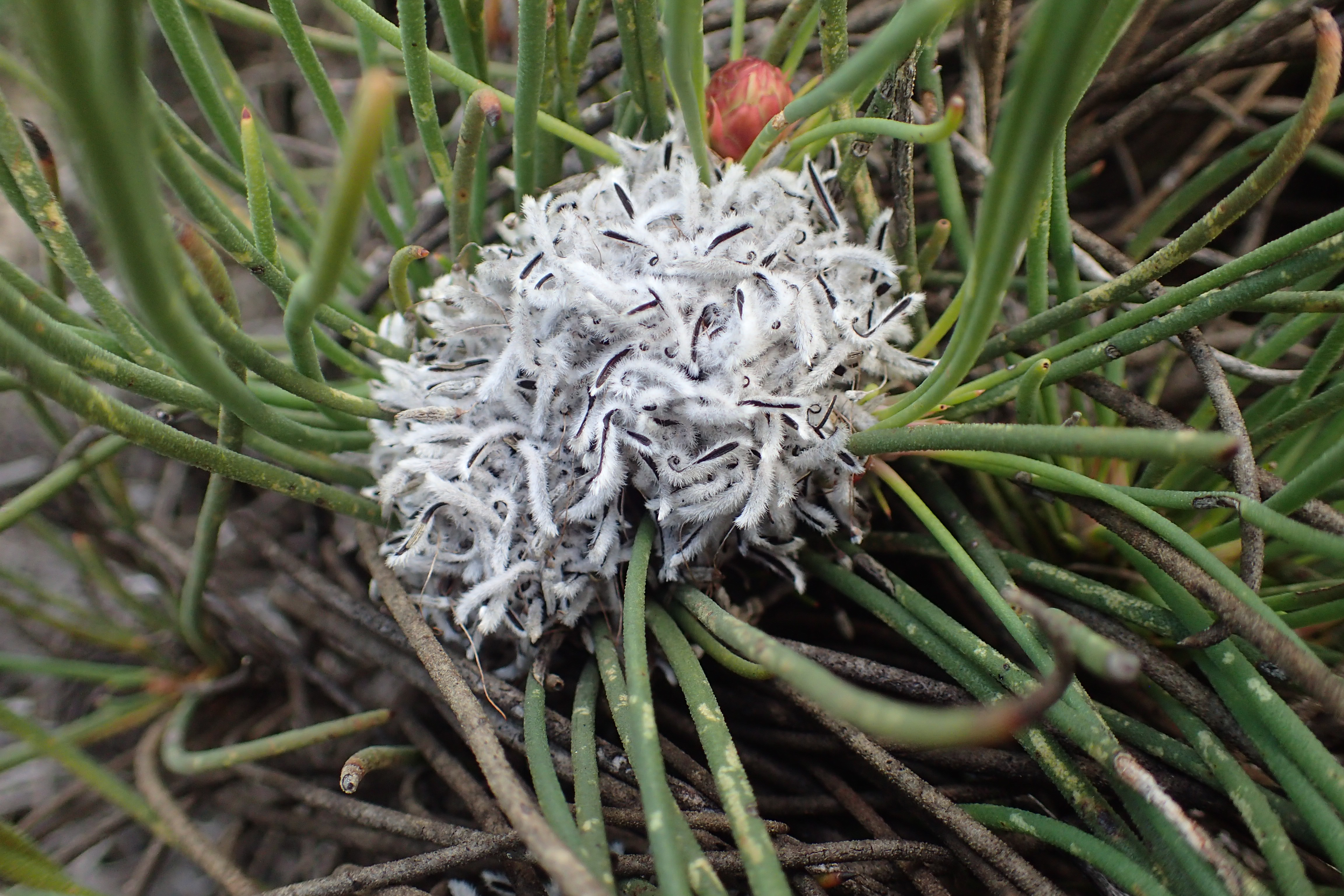

Scientific classification
- Kingdom: Plantae
- Clade: Tracheophytes
- Clade: Angiosperms
- Clade: Eudicots
- Order: Proteales
- Family: Proteaceae
- Genus: Petrophile
- Species: P. aspera

Binomial name
- Petrophile aspera C.A.Gardner ex Foreman

= Petrophile aspera =

Species of shrub endemic to Western Australia

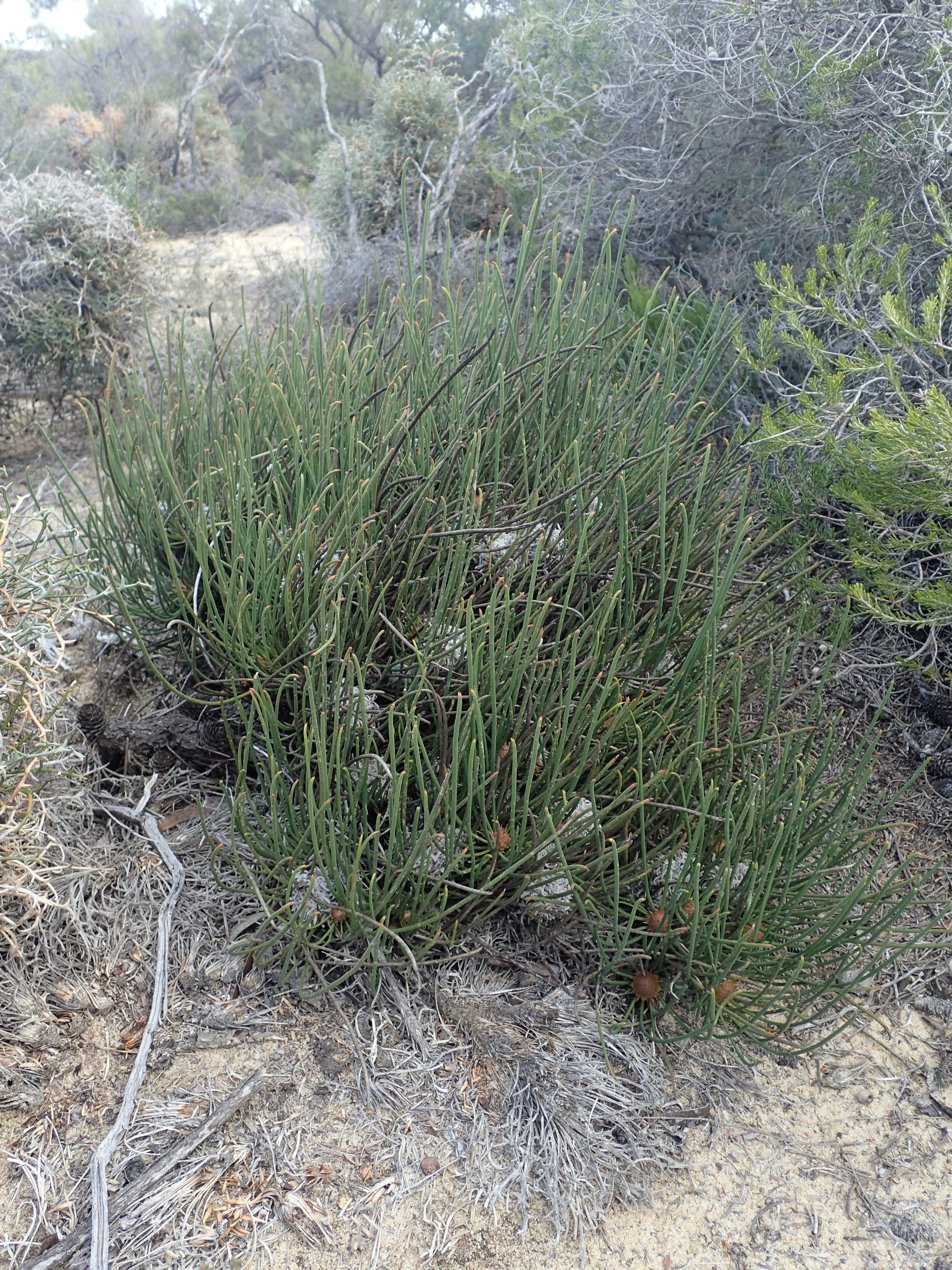
Habit in the Tarin Rock Nature Reserve

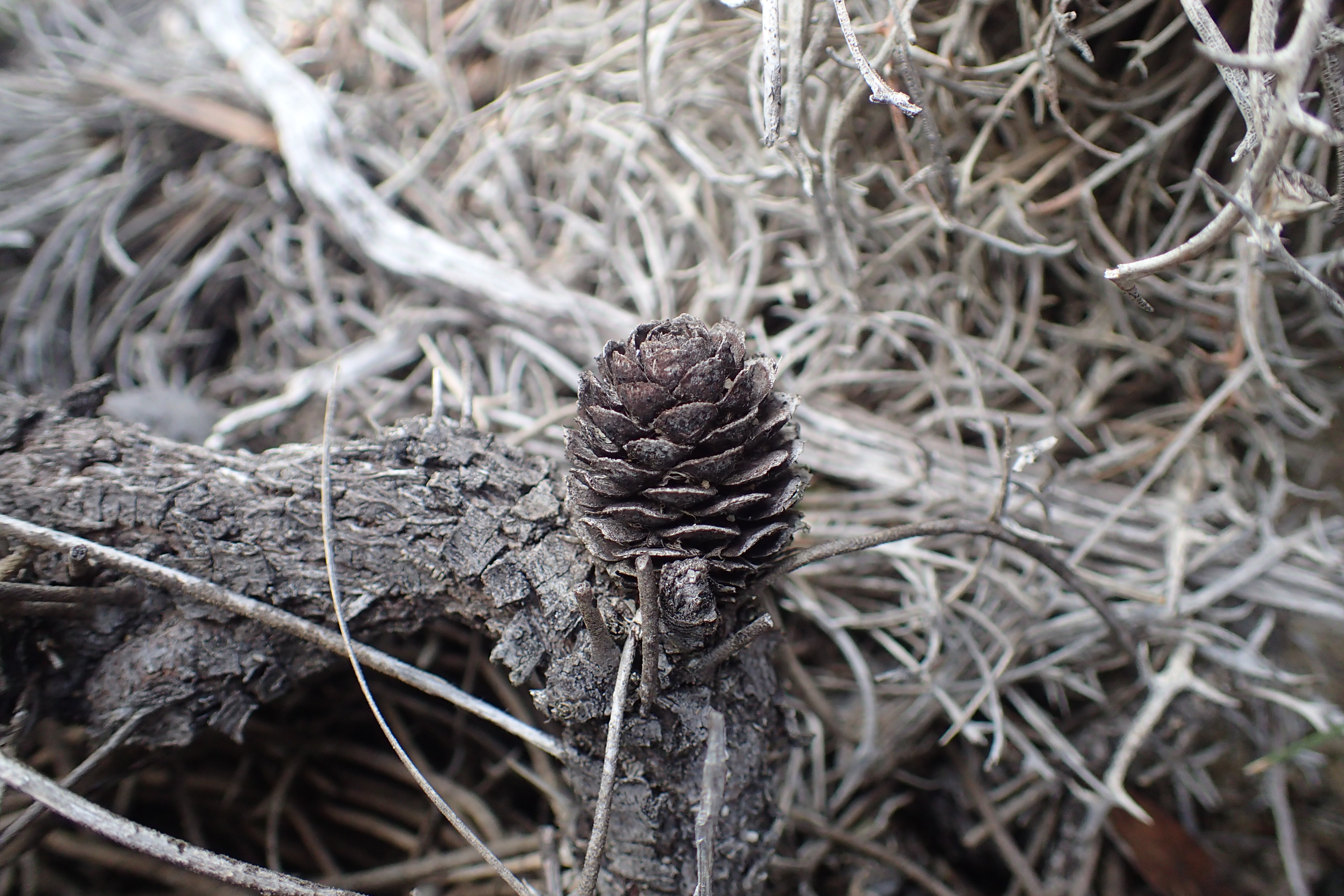
Fruit

Petrophile aspera is a species of flowering plant in the family Proteaceae and is endemic to the south-west of Western Australia. It is a low shrub with relatively long, cylindrical leaves often curled at the tip, and oval heads of scented pale pink to pale yellow or white flowers.

== Description ==
Petrophile aspera is a shrub that typically grows to a height of 0.2–0.5 m (7.9 in – 1 ft 7.7 in) and has glabrous branchlets and leaves. The leaves are cylindrical, 110–300 mm (4.3–11.8 in) long and 1.5–2 mm (0.059–0.079 in) wide, often curled at the tip. The flowers are arranged on the ends of branchlets in sessile, oval heads up to 30 mm (1.2 in) long, with linear to lance-shaped involucral bracts at the base. The flowers are about 20 mm (0.79 in) long, sweetly scented, pale pink to pale yellow or white. Flowering occurs from August to November and the fruit is a nut, fused with others in a more or less elliptical head up to 25 mm (0.98 in) long.

== Taxonomy ==
Petrophile aspera was first formally described in 1990 by Donald Bruce Foreman in the journal Muelleria from material collected east of Dumbleyung by Alex George in 1978. The name Petorphile aspera was mentioned in an unpublished manuscript by Charles Gardner. The specific epithet (aspera) means "rough to the touch", referring to short, hard projections on the leaves.

== Distribution and habitat ==
This petrophile grows in low woodland, shrubland and heath between Narrogin, Lake Grace and the Stirling Range in the Avon Wheatbelt and Mallee biogeographic regions of southwestern Western Australia.

== Conservation status ==
Petrophile aspera is classified as "not threatened" by the Western Australian Government Department of Parks and Wildlife.
