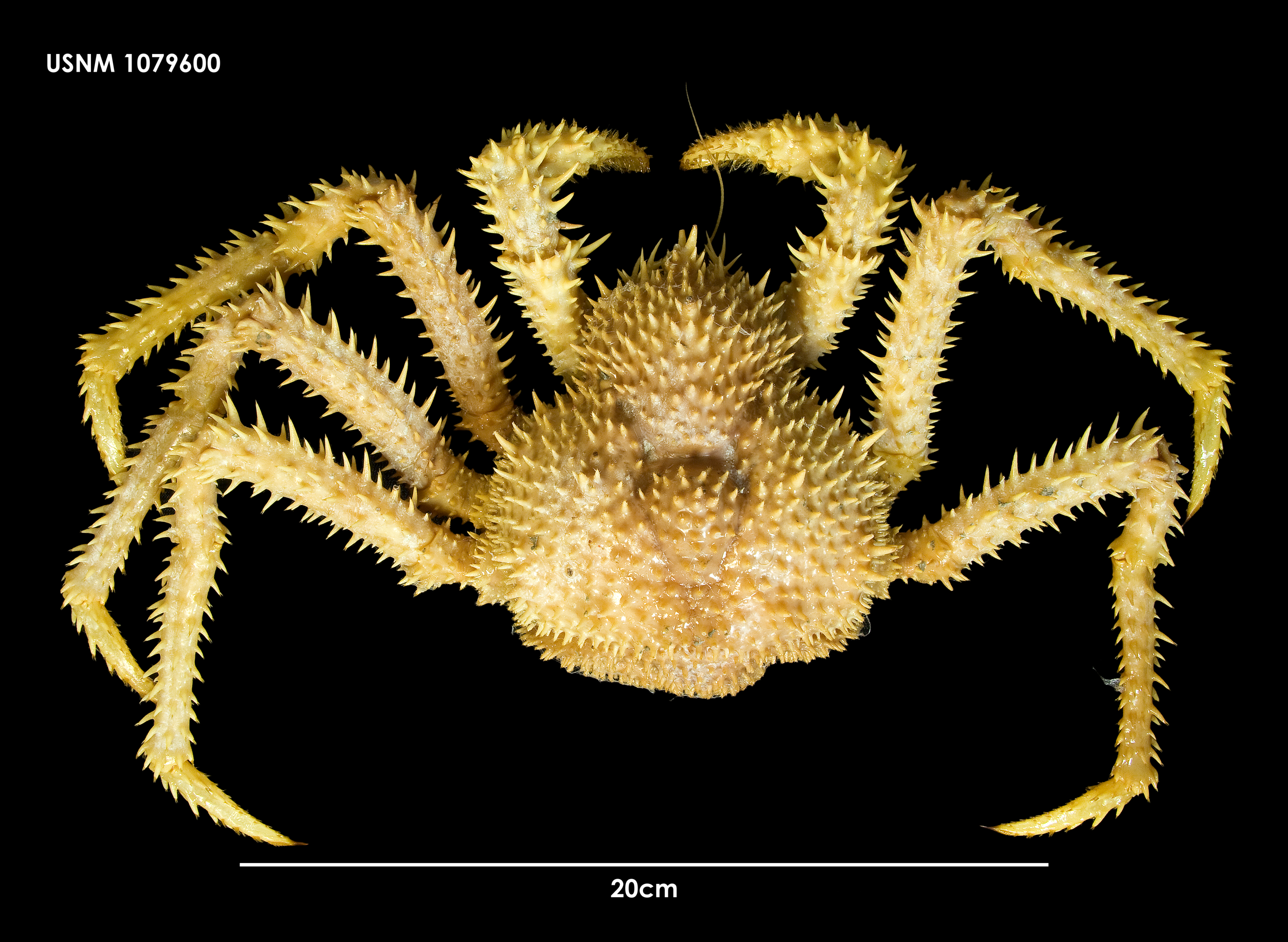

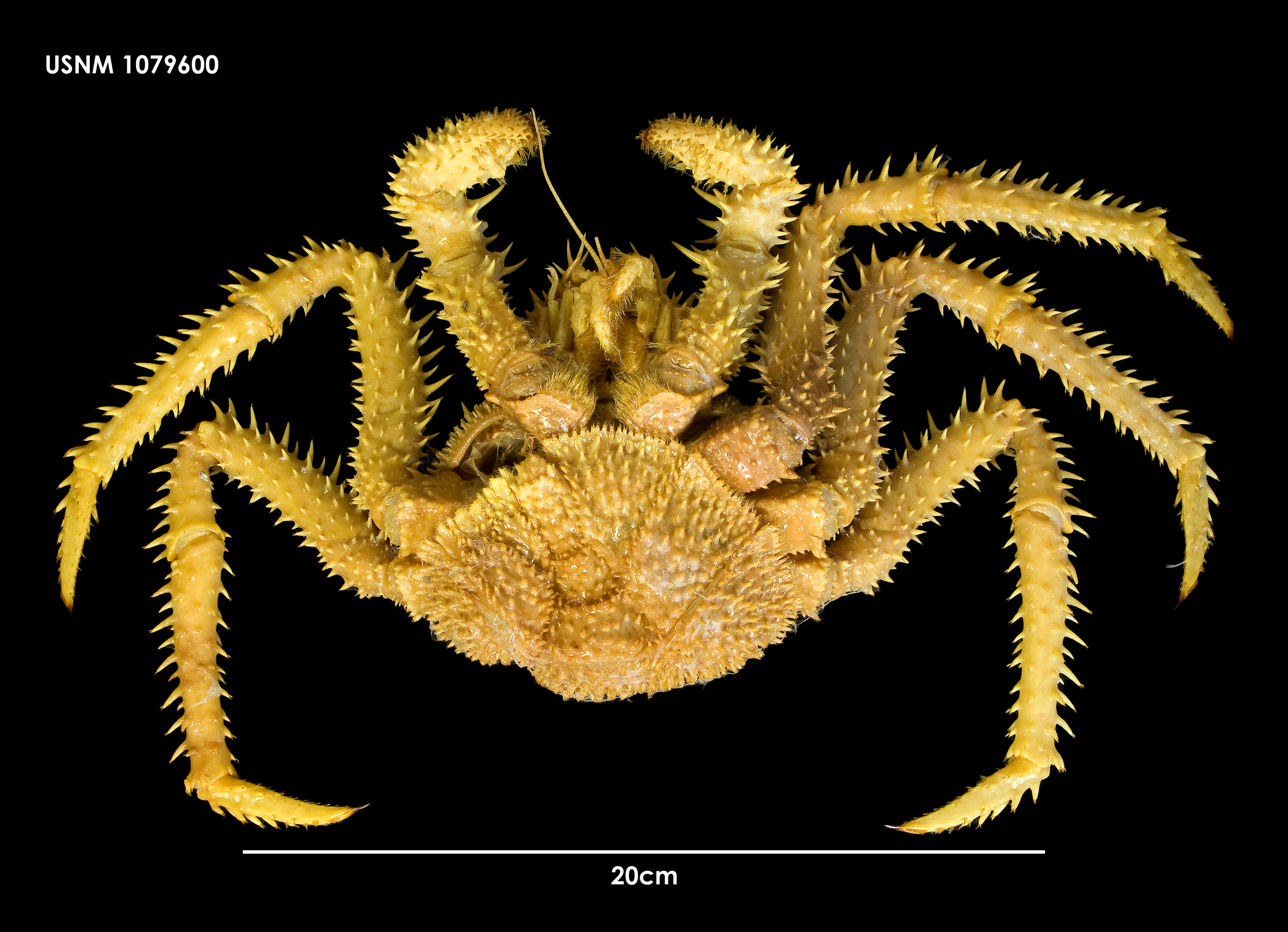

Scientific classification
- Kingdom: Animalia
- Phylum: Arthropoda
- Class: Malacostraca
- Order: Decapoda
- Suborder: Pleocyemata
- Infraorder: Anomura
- Family: Lithodidae
- Genus: Paralomis
- Species: P. spinosissima

Binomial name
- Paralomis spinosissima Birstein & Vinogradov, 1972

= Paralomis spinosissima =

Species of king crab

Paralomis spinosissima, also known as the Antarctic stone crab, is a species of king crab.

== Description ==
Paralomis spinosissima's carapace is pyriform or nearly pentagonal and is slightly longer than it is wide. Its rostrum extends past the eyestalks and consists of three sharp spines – one medial pointing forward and two dorsal diverging outward and upward. Its carapace is covered with long, conical spines, and its walking legs and chelipeds are densely covered in long, sharp ones. The lateral and posterior regions of the carapace are covered by small spines, while the dorsal and ventral margins are covered in tall spines and blunt spines, respectively. It can grow up to 126 mm (5.0 in) in length and 132 mm (5.2 in) in width, and adults have weighed up to 1.40 kg (3.1 lb).

== Distribution ==
Paralomis spinosissima has been found in the Southeast Atlantic, the Scotia Sea, near South Georgia island, and south of the Falkland Islands at depths of 132–877 m (433–2,877 ft). It thrives at temperatures of about 1 °C (34 °F), relatively low for king crabs.

== Taxonomy ==
Paralomis spinosissima was described in 1972 as Paralomis spinosissimus by carcinologists Yakov A. Birstein and Lev G. Vinogradov. The female holotype was taken in 1965 by the trawler Akademik Knipovich off the northeast coast of South Georgia at a depth of 640–650 m (2,100–2,130 ft). Birstein and Vinogradov remarked on its carapace being similar to that of Paralomis longidactylus, described in the same paper and also found in the southwestern Atlantic.
