= Pterostylis aspera =

Rough shell orchid

Scientific classification
- Kingdom: Plantae
- Clade: Tracheophytes
- Clade: Angiosperms
- Clade: Monocots
- Order: Asparagales
- Family: Orchidaceae
- Subfamily: Orchidoideae
- Tribe: Cranichideae
- Genus: Pterostylis
- Species: P. aspera

Binomial name
- Pterostylis aspera D.L.Jones & M.A.Clem.

Synonyms
- Diplodium asperum (D.L.Jones & M.A.Clem.) D.L.Jones & M.A.Clem.

Species of orchid

Pterostylis aspera, commonly known as rough shell orchid, is a species of orchid endemic to the south-west of Western Australia. As with similar greenhoods, the flowering plants differ from those which are not flowering. The non-flowering plants have a rosette of leaves flat on the ground but the flowering plants have a single flower with leaves on the flowering spike. In this common species, the flower is white with green and reddish-brown stripes and a short, straight labellum.

== Description ==
Pterostylis aspera is a terrestrial, perennial, deciduous, herb with an underground tuber and when not flowering, a rosette of bluish-green leaves lying flat on the ground. Each leaf is 6–20 mm (0.2–0.8 in) long and 4–17 mm (0.2–0.7 in) wide. Flowering plants usually only have a single flower 22–30 mm (0.9–1 in) long and 10–12 mm (0.4–0.5 in) wide which leans forwards on a flowering stem 60–200 mm (2–8 in) high. There are between three and five stem leaves 20–30 mm (0.8–1 in) long and 3–5 mm (0.1–0.2 in) wide . The flowers are white with green and reddish-brown stripes. The dorsal sepal and petals are fused, forming a hood or "galea" over the column and the dorsal sepal has a sharp point. The lateral sepals are held closely against the galea and have narrow tips 30–35 mm (1.2–1.4 in) long and a broad sinus with a small notch between their bases. The labellum is 13–15 mm (0.5–0.6 in) long, about 4 mm (0.2 in) wide, relatively straight, and only just visible above the sinus. Flowering occurs from May to July.

== Taxonomy and naming ==
Pterostylis aspera was first formally described in 1989 by David Jones and Mark Clements from a specimen collected near Eaton and the description was published in Australian Orchid Research. The specific epithet (aspera) is a Latin word meaning "rough", "harsh" or "uneven", referring to hairs on the labellum.

== Distribution and habitat ==
Rough shell orchid grows in shrubland and woodland between Dongara and Jerramungup in the Avon Wheatbelt, Esperance Plains, Jarrah Forest, Mallee and Swan Coastal Plain biogeographic regions.

== Conservation ==
Pterostylis aspera is listed as "not threatened" by the Government of Western Australia Department of Parks and Wildlife.
