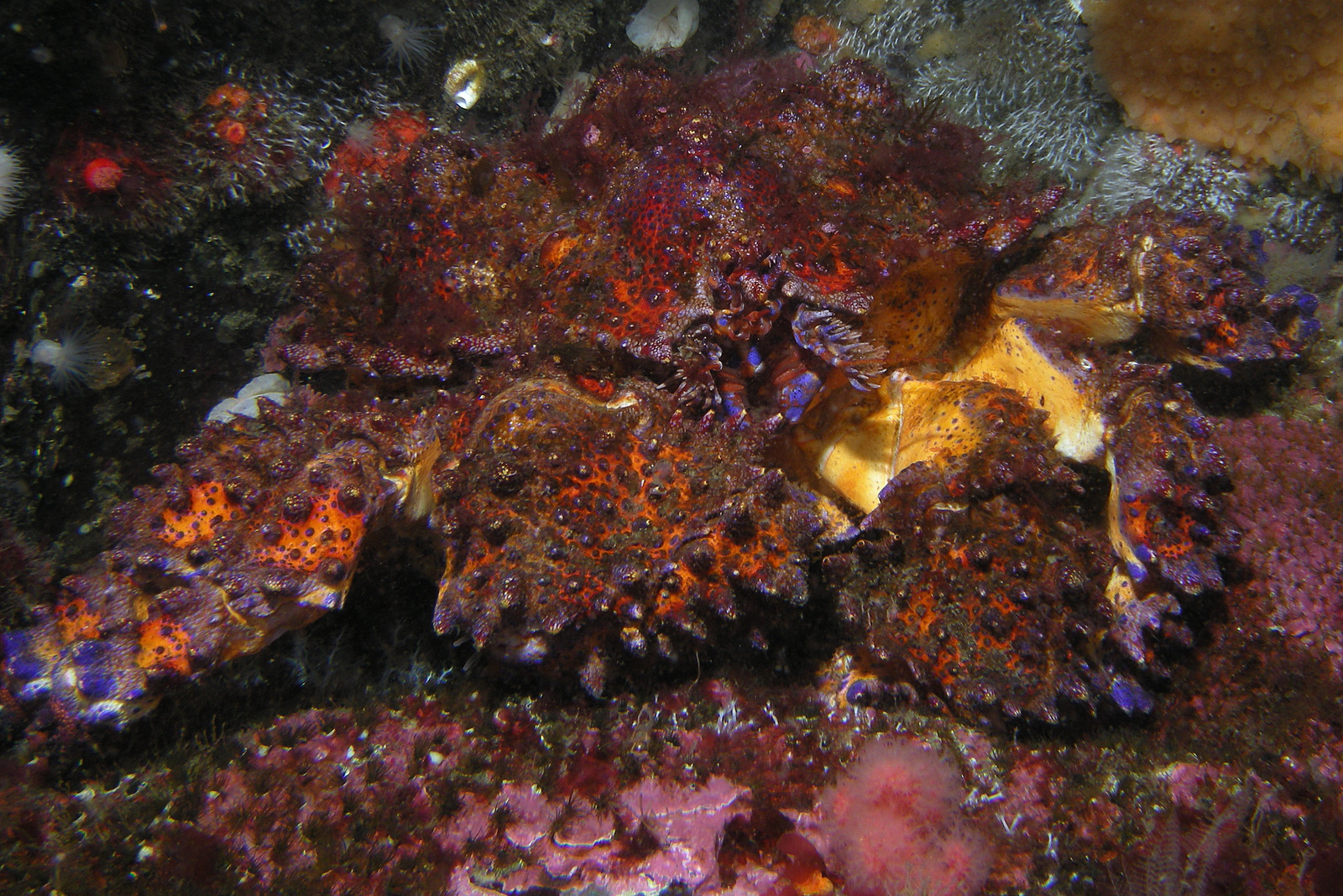
- Echidnocerus cibarius

Scientific classification
- Kingdom: Animalia
- Phylum: Arthropoda
- Class: Malacostraca
- Order: Decapoda
- Suborder: Pleocyemata
- Infraorder: Anomura
- Family: Lithodidae
- Subfamily: Lithodinae
- Genus: Echidnocerus; White, 1842

Type species
- Echidnocerus cibarius White, 1842

Synonyms
- Ctenorhinus Gibbons, 1854; Echinocerus White, 1848; Lopholithodes Brandt, 1848

= Echidnocerus =

Genus of king crabs

Echidnocerus is a genus of king crab. It includes Echidnocerus foraminatus (the brown box crab) and Echidnocerus cibarius, the Puget Sound king crab. The genus was long known as Lopholithodes until it was discovered in 2022 that Lopholithodes is a junior synonym of Echidnocerus.

== Species ==
Echidnocerus contains the following two species:

Image	Scientific name	Common name	Distribution	References
	Echidnocerus cibarius White, 1842	Puget Sound king crab	Alaska to California	
	Echidnocerus foraminatus Stimpson, 1859	Brown box crab	From Prince William Sound in the Gulf of Alaska to San Diego, California	
