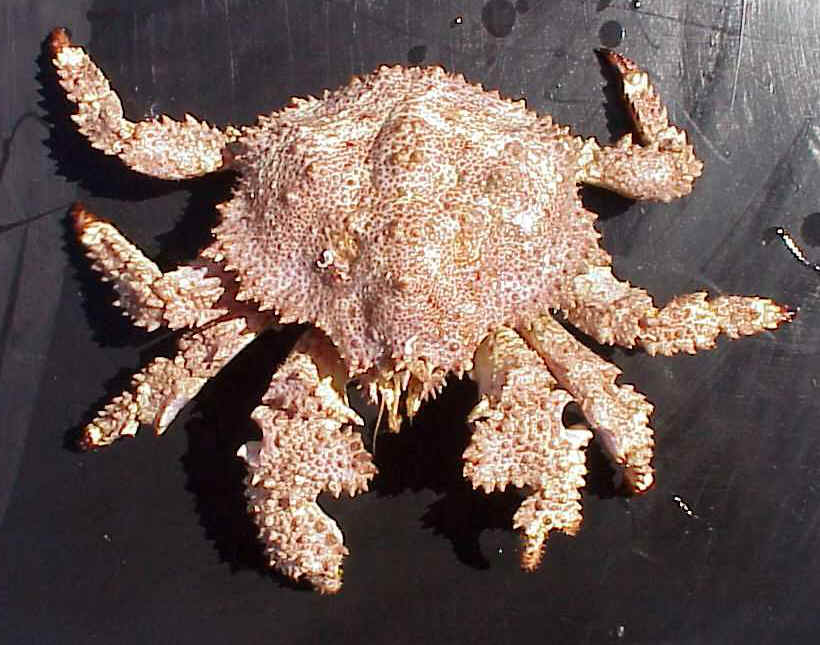

Scientific classification
- Domain: Eukaryota
- Kingdom: Animalia
- Phylum: Arthropoda
- Class: Malacostraca
- Order: Decapoda
- Suborder: Pleocyemata
- Infraorder: Anomura
- Family: Lithodidae
- Genus: Echidnocerus
- Species: E. foraminatus

Binomial name
- Echidnocerus foraminatus Stimpson, 1859

= Brown box crab =

Species of king crab

The brown box crab (Echidnocerus foraminatus) is a king crab that lives from Prince William Sound, Alaska to San Diego, California, at depths of 0–547 metres (0–1,795 ft). It reaches a carapace length of 150 millimetres (5.9 in) and feeds on bivalves and detritus. The box crab gets its name from a pair of round tunnel-like openings that form between the claws and adjacent legs when the animal folds its limbs up against its body. Both claws, and their adjacent legs, have matching half-circle notches in them that line up to create a circle-shaped opening when the limbs are tightly pulled against one another. This tubular round opening is called a foramen. The crab often lies buried in the sediment, and the two foramens in the chelipeds allow water into the gill chamber for respiration. The gill chamber is also sometimes used by the commensal fish Careproctus to hold its eggs.

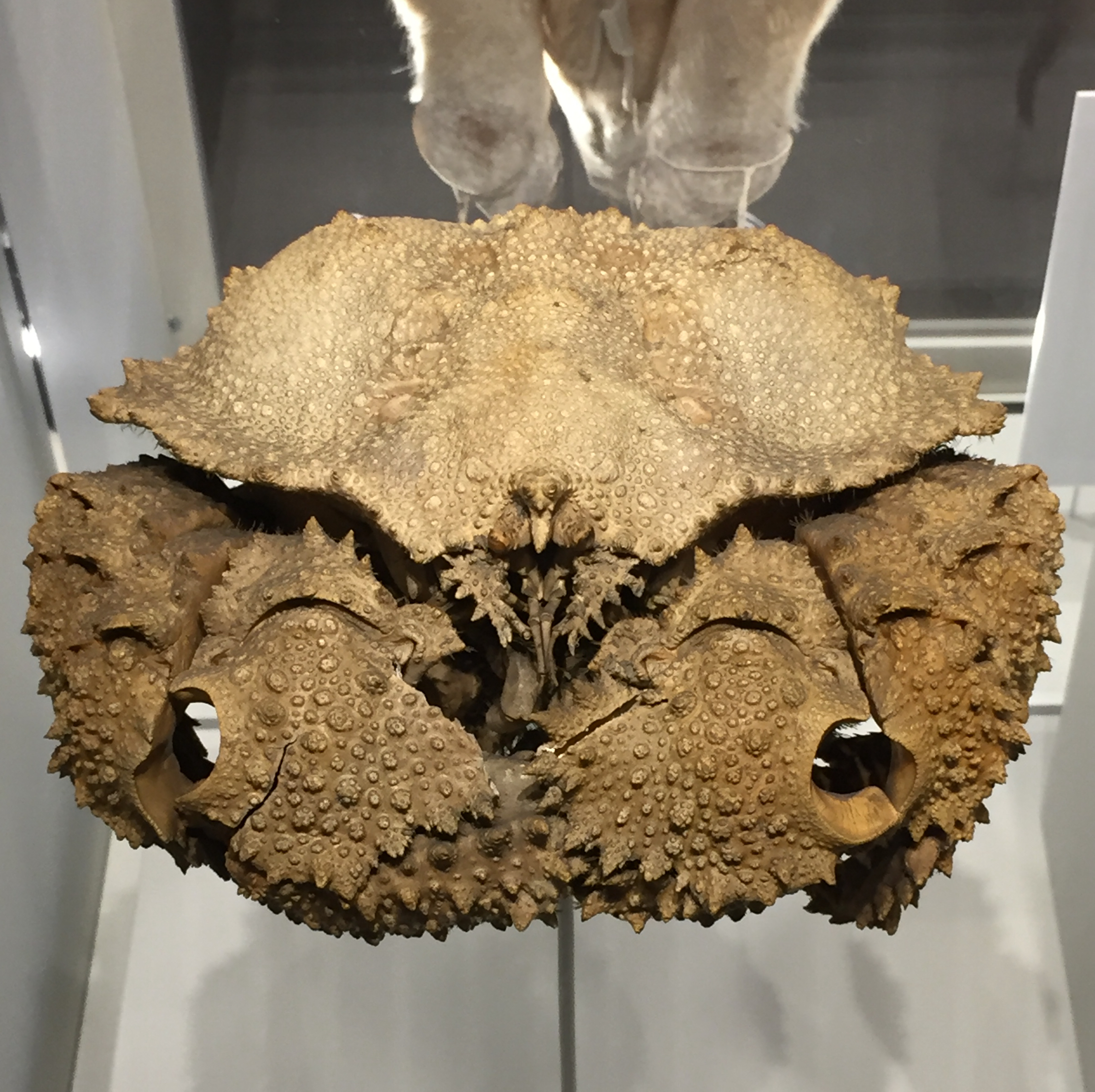
Taxidermied museum specimen prepared in a position to show how the legs and claws form two foramens while folded

== Fisheries ==
The brown box crab has been fished in California since at least 1984. Take was minor and largely incidental until the mid 2010s, when landings by mass increased five-fold in 2017 relative to 2016 and remained above 20.5 t (45,000 lb) until 2023. In 2019, the California Department of Fish and Wildlife launched an experimental fishery for brown box crabs.
