= Neolithodes duhameli =

Scientific classification
- Kingdom: Animalia
- Phylum: Arthropoda
- Class: Malacostraca
- Order: Decapoda
- Suborder: Pleocyemata
- Infraorder: Anomura
- Family: Lithodidae
- Genus: Neolithodes
- Species: N. duhameli

Binomial name
- Neolithodes duhameli Macpherson, 2004

Species of king crab

Neolithodes duhameli is a species of king crab that is found in the Crozet Islands in the southwestern Indian Ocean from a depth of 620–1,500 metres (2,030–4,920 ft).

== Description ==
Neolithodes duhameli has a dark red, pyriform carapace which is evenly covered in a combination of long, thick spines (of up to about 1/3 the carapace length) and many spinules. Females are known to grow up to 144 mm (5.7 in) in carapace width and 120 mm (4.7 in) in carapace length, and the rearmost walking legs are each about twice as long as the carapace.

== Taxonomy ==
Neolithodes duhameli was first described in 2004 by carcinologist Enrique Macpherson. It is among a subgroup of Neolithodes – alongside N. agassizii, N. asperrimus, and N. nipponensis – whose carapace, chelipeds, and walking legs are covered with many spinules or spine-like granules. The specific name duhameli honours Guy Duhamel of the National Museum of Natural History in France.
