= Tasman Fracture =

Ocean trench off the south west coast of Tasmania

Coordinates: 44°36′26.61″S 144°36′12.93″E

Location in Australian waters

The Tasman Fracture is a 4 kilometres (2.5 miles) deep ocean trench off the south west coast of Tasmania. It is located within the boundaries of the Tasman Fracture Commonwealth Marine Reserve which lies within the Tasmania Province of the Integrated Marine and Coastal Regionalisation of Australia.

== See also ==
- South-east Commonwealth Marine Reserve Network
