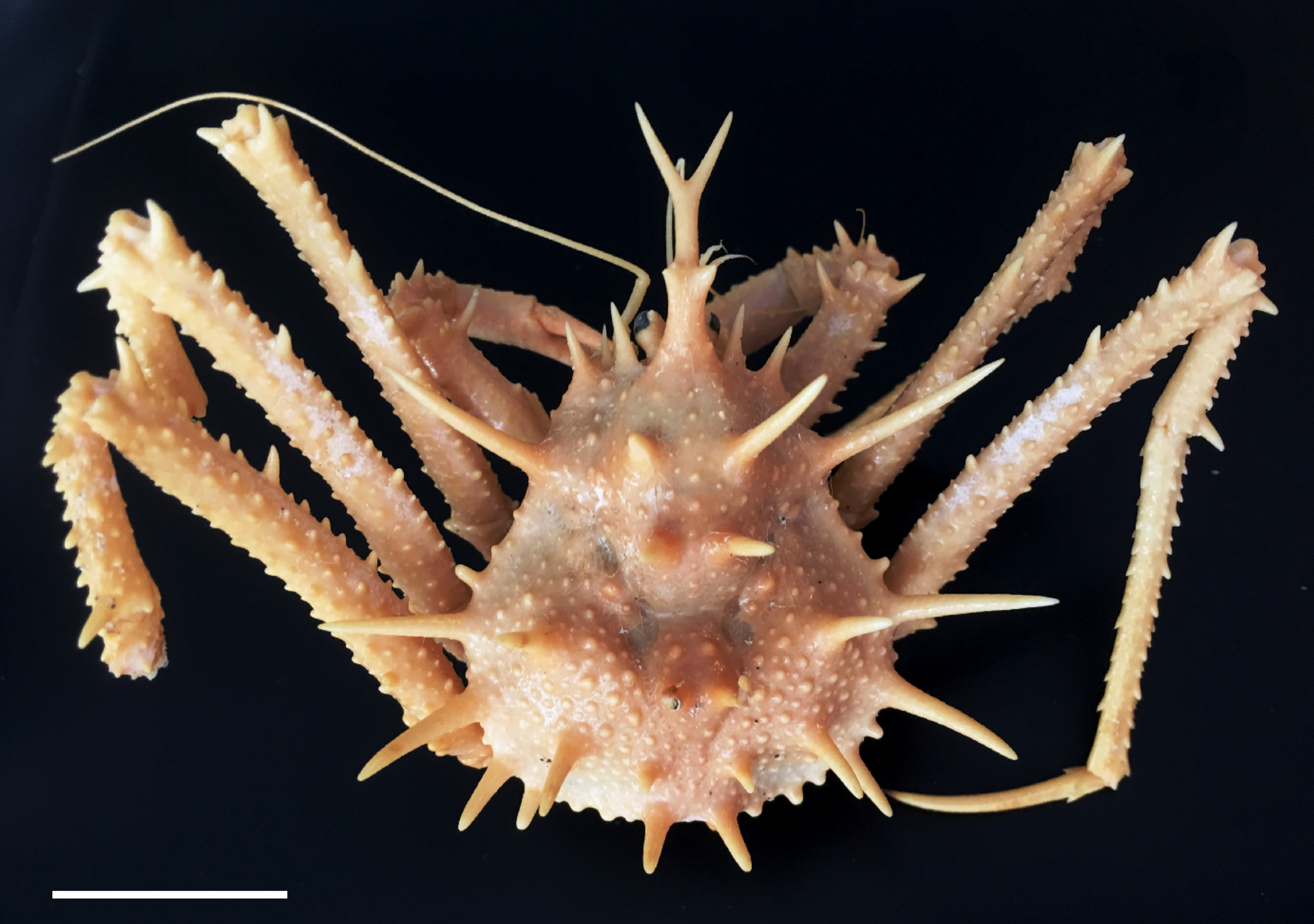
- L. couesi from the Burdwood Bank

Scientific classification
- Domain: Eukaryota
- Kingdom: Animalia
- Phylum: Arthropoda
- Class: Malacostraca
- Order: Decapoda
- Suborder: Pleocyemata
- Infraorder: Anomura
- Family: Lithodidae
- Genus: Lithodes
- Species: L. couesi

Binomial name
- Lithodes couesi Benedict, 1895

= Lithodes couesi =

Species of king crab

Lithodes couesi, also known as the scarlet king crab, is a species of king crab. It is typically found in the northeastern Pacific Ocean, but in 2019, it was found in the Burdwood Bank around the Scotia Arc at a depth of 605 m (1,985 ft).
