= L. panamensis =

L. panamensis may refer to:

- Lacmellea panamensis, a species of tree in the family Apocynaceae
- Lithodes panamensis, a species of king crab

== Synonyms ==
- Lacunaria panamensis, a synonym of Lacunaria crenata
- Laurona panamensis, a synonym of Hyalurga sora
