= L. ferox =

L. ferox may refer to:

- Laphria ferox, a species of robber fly
- Lithodes ferox, the fierce king crab, a species of king crab
- Lobivia ferox, a synonym of Echinopsis ferox, a species of cactus in the family Cactoideae
- Liopleurodon ferox, the holotype of the extinct pliosaurid Liopleurodon
