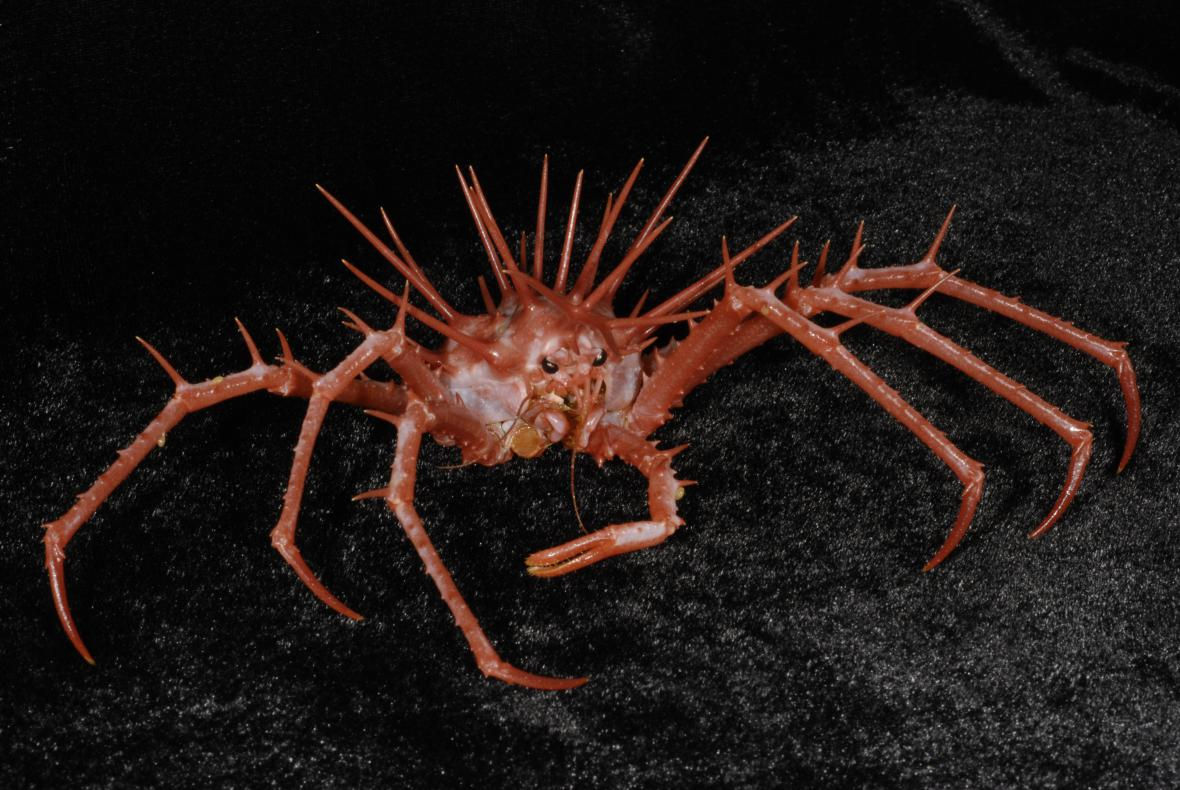
- Juvenile above, adult specimen below
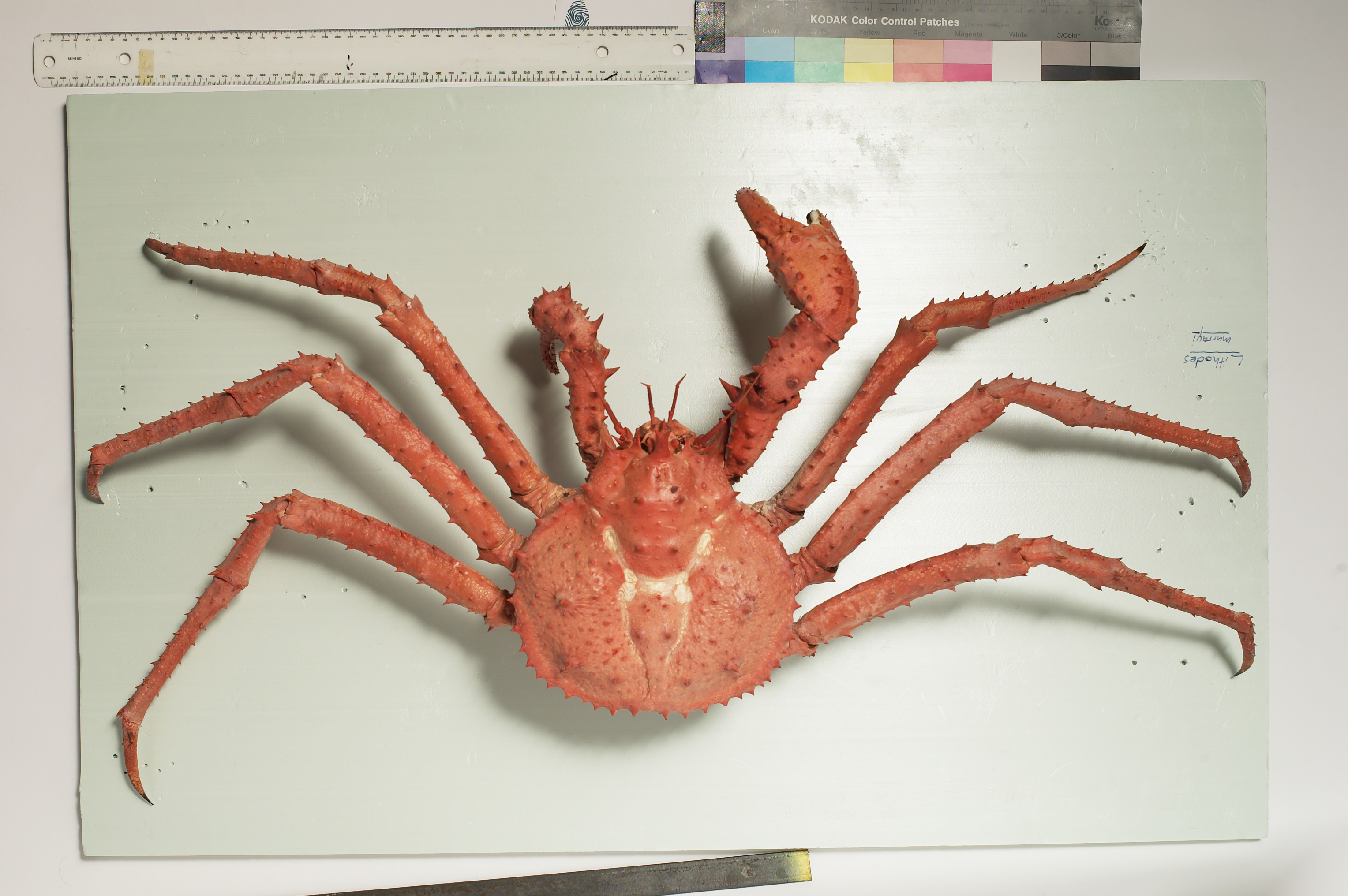

Conservation status
- Not Threatened (NZ TCS)

Scientific classification
- Kingdom: Animalia
- Phylum: Arthropoda
- Clade: Pancrustacea
- Class: Malacostraca
- Order: Decapoda
- Suborder: Pleocyemata
- Infraorder: Anomura
- Family: Lithodidae
- Genus: Lithodes
- Species: L. aotearoa

Binomial name
- Lithodes aotearoa Ahyong, 2010

= Lithodes aotearoa =

Species of king crab

Holotype site: NIWA 34924

Lithodes aotearoa is a species of king crab endemic to New Zealand. It had formerly been confused with L. longispina and L. murrayi, which until 2010 were thought to occur in the region. It is the second most widespread and common lithodid in New Zealand waters after Neolithodes brodiei, and the New Zealand Department of Conservation classifies it as "Not Threatened".

== Description ==
Lithodes aotearoa is deep-purplish red in colour and has a pyriform carapace. The carapace is covered with prominent, slender spines in juveniles and short, conical spines in adults. In between the spines are a smooth surface sparsely dotted with granules or small secondary spines. Its carapace has been measured as large as 195.0 mm (7.68 in) long (Note: Using postorbital carapace length (pcl), which is measured from the rear margin of the orbit and therefore excludes the rostrum. Including the rostrum, the carapace is 240.0 mm (9.45 in) long in the male and 230.5 mm (9.07 in) in the female.) and 199.1 mm (7.84 in) wide in a male specimen. The largest known female carapace measures 190.5 mm (7.50 in) in postrostral length and 183.9 mm (7.24 in) in width. Its rearmost pair of walking legs is the longest, and its legspan can be over 130 cm (51 in). It is the largest lithodid known from New Zealand.

== Fisheries ==
Lithodes aotearoa are commercially fished in the waters around New Zealand. They are included, with Neolithodes brodiei, in the total allowable commercial catch of up to 90 t (200,000 lb; 99 short tons) for king crabs under New Zealand's Quota Management System.
