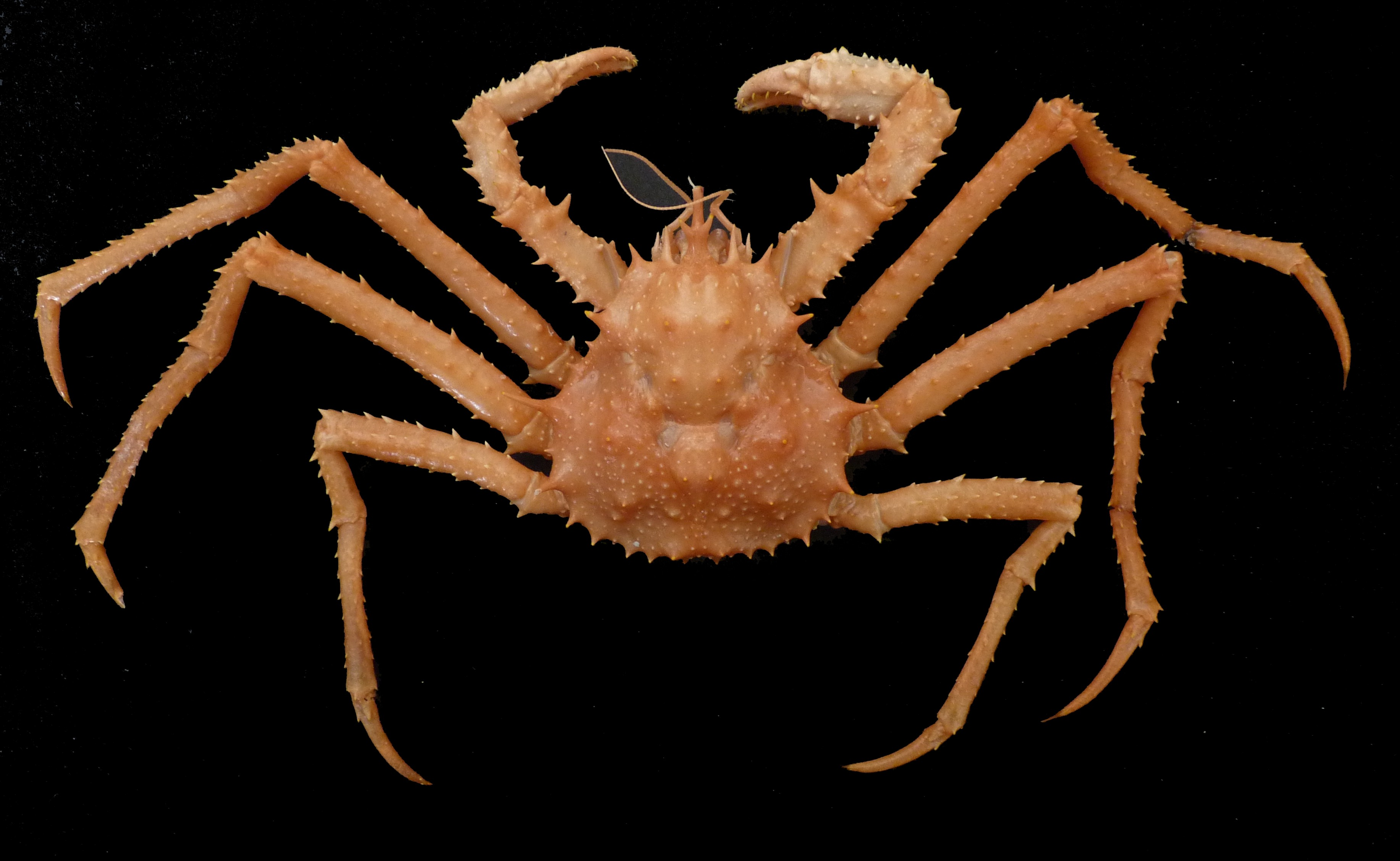
- L. turkayi from the Beagle Channel

Scientific classification
- Kingdom: Animalia
- Phylum: Arthropoda
- Class: Malacostraca
- Order: Decapoda
- Suborder: Pleocyemata
- Infraorder: Anomura
- Family: Lithodidae
- Genus: Lithodes
- Species: L. turkayi

Binomial name
- Lithodes turkayi Macpherson, 1988

= Lithodes turkayi =

Species of king crab

Lithodes turkayi is a species of king crab. It has been found at depths of 70–1,696 m (230–5,564 ft) and lives in the Pacific Ocean off the coast of Chile, the southern Atlantic Ocean near the Falkland Islands, and the Southern Ocean in the Bellingshausen Sea.

== Description ==
L. turkayi is reddish-brownish with red carapace spines and dark red legs. It has a pyriform carapace which has been measured in males to be as long as 109 mm (4.3 in) and as wide as 110 mm (4.3 in). It is morphologically similar to L. murrayi, but its legs distinguish it both in that they are longer proportionally and that they have more numerous but less prominent spines.
