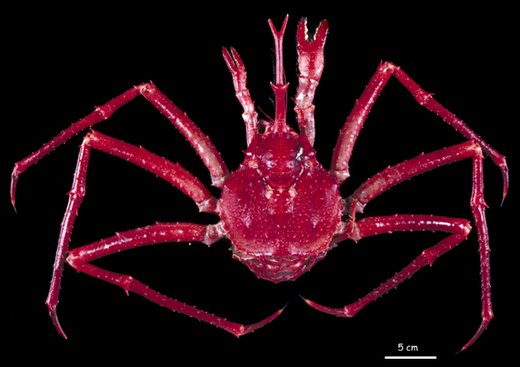

Scientific classification
- Kingdom: Animalia
- Phylum: Arthropoda
- Clade: Pancrustacea
- Class: Malacostraca
- Order: Decapoda
- Suborder: Pleocyemata
- Infraorder: Anomura
- Family: Lithodidae
- Genus: Lithodes
- Species: L. richeri

Binomial name
- Lithodes richeri Macpherson, 1990

= Lithodes richeri =

Species of king crab

Lithodes richeri is a species of king crab. It has been found in Vanuatu, New Caledonia, and eastern Australia at depths between 860–1,220 m (2,820–4,000 ft).

== Description ==
Lithodes richeri has a pyriform carapace and is overall deep-red in colour. The largest female carapace yet measured is 143 mm (5.6 in) in postorbital length (Note: Postorbital carapace length excludes the rostrum.) and 127 mm (5.0 in) in width, while the largest male carapace is 112.1 mm (4.41 in) in postorbital length and 105.8 mm (4.17 in) in width. When the rostrum – angled upward at about 30° – is included, it accounts for anywhere from slightly more to slightly less than half the length of the carapace. This is exceptionally long among king crabs from Australia and New Zealand. The chelipeds are unequal in size and are slightly larger relative to the postorbital carapace length in males compared to females. Its first pair of walking legs are the shortest and the third pair the longest; all three pairs of walking legs are longer relative to postorbital carapace length in males compared to females.

== Distribution ==
Lithodes richeri is found in Vanuatu, New Caledonia, and eastern Australia between depths of 860–1,220 m (2,820–4,000 ft). In 2004, a large female king crab from the Seram Sea was identified as L. richeri, but this was later identified in 2018 as L. ahyongi, a new species.

== Taxonomy ==
Lithodes richeri was described in 1990 by carcinologist Enrique Macpherson. It is named for Richer de Forges of the Office de la recherche scientifique et technique d'outre-mer (ORSTROM), who collected most of the type material. Adults can be easily distinguished from other king crabs in Australia and New Zealand by their exceptionally long rostrum, but juveniles in southeastern Australian waters may be confused for Lithodes australiensis – distinguished by sublter features like fused plates in L. richeri's second abdominal segment compared to unfused plates in L. australiensis'.
