= Lithodes galapagensis =

Scientific classification
- Domain: Eukaryota
- Kingdom: Animalia
- Phylum: Arthropoda
- Class: Malacostraca
- Order: Decapoda
- Suborder: Pleocyemata
- Infraorder: Anomura
- Family: Lithodidae
- Genus: Lithodes
- Species: L. galapagensis

Binomial name
- Lithodes galapagensis Hall & Thatje, 2009

Species of king crab

Lithodes galapagensis is a species of king crab described in 2009 that lives around the Galápagos Islands, where it's known from depths of 648 and 740 m (2,126 and 2,428 ft). The two specimens upon which it was described (the holotype male and a paratype female) had a carapace length of 11.4 and 8.4 cm (4.5 and 3.3 in), and the species quite resembles L. wiracocha from Peru.
