= Lithodes macquariae =

Conservation status
- Naturally Uncommon (NZ TCS)

Scientific classification
- Domain: Eukaryota
- Kingdom: Animalia
- Phylum: Arthropoda
- Class: Malacostraca
- Order: Decapoda
- Suborder: Pleocyemata
- Infraorder: Anomura
- Family: Lithodidae
- Genus: Lithodes
- Species: L. macquariae

Binomial name
- Lithodes macquariae Ahyong, 2010

Species of king crab

Lithodes macquariae is a species of king crab located off Macquarie Island, the Auckland Islands, and Peter I Island. It has been found at depths of 16–1,140 m (52–3,740 ft).

== Description ==
L. macquariae is deep-red in colour and has a pyriform carapace with short, conical spines. Its carapace has been measured to be as large as 145.1 mm (5.71 in) in length and 116.8 mm (4.60 in) in width. It was previously misidentified as L. murrayi.
