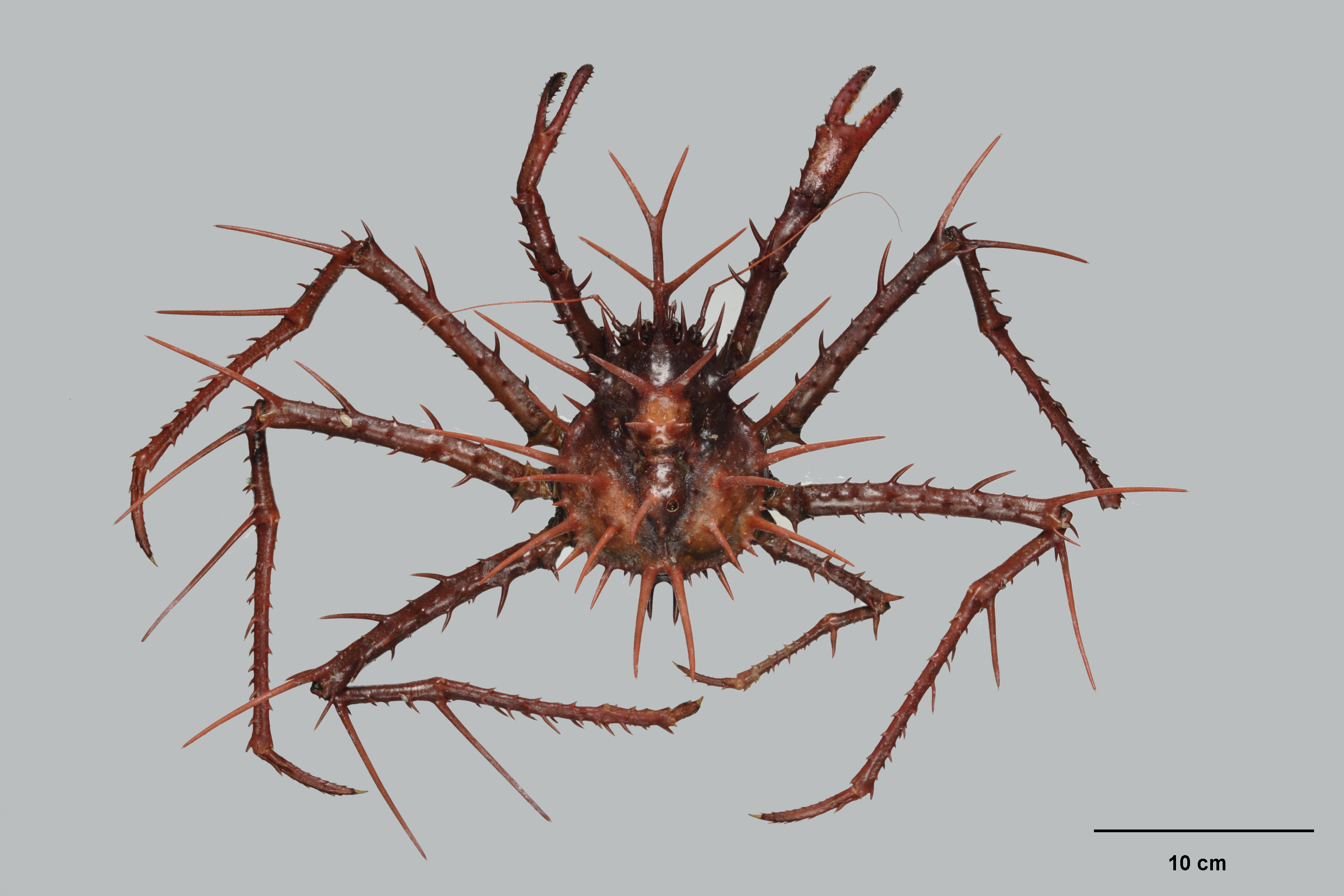

Scientific classification
- Kingdom: Animalia
- Phylum: Arthropoda
- Class: Malacostraca
- Order: Decapoda
- Suborder: Pleocyemata
- Infraorder: Anomura
- Family: Lithodidae
- Genus: Lithodes
- Species: L. chaddertoni

Binomial name
- Lithodes chaddertoni Ahyong, 2010

= Lithodes chaddertoni =

Species of king crab

Lithodes chaddertoni is a species of king crab. It is found southwest of Australia either on the Naturaliste Plateau or the Broken Ridge, although precise distribution information is not presently known.

== Description ==
Lithodes chaddertoni is deep-red in colour and has a pyriform carapace covered with long, slender spines and sparsely distributed granules. Its spines are the largest of any known Lithodes species, with the spines and rostrum being nearly 0.9x as long as the postorbital (Note: Without the rostrum) carapace length in adults. Along with Lithodes jessica, it is highly distinct from other Lithodes in that it retains its sharp juvenile spines – common in Lithodes – into adulthood.
