= L. rachelae =

L. rachelae may refer to:

- Lithodes rachelae, a species of king crab
- Lycia rachelae, the twilight moth, a species of moth in the family Geometridae
