= Lithodes paulayi =

Scientific classification
- Kingdom: Animalia
- Phylum: Arthropoda
- Clade: Pancrustacea
- Class: Malacostraca
- Order: Decapoda
- Suborder: Pleocyemata
- Infraorder: Anomura
- Family: Lithodidae
- Genus: Lithodes
- Species: L. paulayi

Binomial name
- Lithodes paulayi Macpherson & Chan, 2008

Species of king crab

Lithodes paulayi is a species of king crab which is known from Guam.

== Description ==
Lithodes paulayi is reddish in color and has a pyriform carapace. The dorsal carapace is covered in many small granules interspersed with long spines; it measures 113 mm × 102 mm (4.4 in × 4.0 in) in the male holotype and 45 mm × 39 mm (1.8 in × 1.5 in) in the male paratype. The second segment of its abdomen is armed with a few small spines. The rostrum is long, being about 80% as long as the rest of the carapace; it is armed with a long bifid projection at the end, a single pair of dorsal spines near the middle, and a strong, curved spine on the ventral side of the base.

Its chelipeds bear strong spines at the end of the merus and on the dorsal and outer surfaces of the carpus (wrist). Its fingers, about 40% longer than its palms, feature many tufts of setae. It has long walking legs, with its longest pair, the third (rearmost), measuring three times the carapace length.

== Distribution ==
Lithodes paulayi's type material was found off the southern coast of Guam in 1998 at a depth of 740 m (2,430 ft). As of 2026, this is its only known locality.

== Taxonomy ==
Lithodes paulayi was described from a male holotype and a smaller male paratype in 2008 by carcinologists Enrique Macpherson and Tin-Yam Chan. It is named after Gustav Paulay of the University of Florida, who loaned out the specimens used in its description. It most closely resembles L. longispina, L. megacantha, and L. formosae. It can be distinguished from L. longispina and L. megacantha by, among other traits, the number and position of long spines on its branchial region, and it is most easily distinguished from L. formosae by the length of its rostrum relative to the rest of its carapace, being much longer in L. paulayi.

== Works cited ==
- Ahyong, Shane T.; Chan, Tin-Yam (11 January 2010). "Lithodes formosae, a new species of king crab from Taiwan (Crustacea: Decapoda: Lithodidae)". Zootaxa. 2332 (1): 61–68. doi:10.11646/zootaxa.2332.1.5 – via ResearchGate.
- Macpherson, Enrique; Chan, Tin-Yam (2008). "Some lithodid crabs (Crustacea: Decapoda: Lithodidae) from Taiwan and adjacent waters, with the description of one new species from Guam". Zootaxa. 1924: 43–52. doi:10.5281/zenodo.184757 – via ResearchGate.
