= L. unicornis =

L. unicornis may refer to:

- Lithodes unicornis, a species of king crab
- Lobocheilos unicornis, a species of ray-finned fish in the family Cyprinidae
