= Lithodes unicornis =

Scientific classification
- Kingdom: Animalia
- Phylum: Arthropoda
- Class: Malacostraca
- Order: Decapoda
- Suborder: Pleocyemata
- Infraorder: Anomura
- Family: Lithodidae
- Genus: Lithodes
- Species: L. unicornis

Binomial name
- Lithodes unicornis Macpherson, 1984

Species of king crab

Lithodes unicornis is a species of king crab. It lives at the muddy bottoms of an oceanic plateau in the southern Atlantic Ocean's Walvis Ridge known as the Valdivia Bank, residing at a depth of about 935 m (3,068 ft).

== Description ==
L. unicornis is cream-coloured with pinkish-tinged walking legs and carapace, darker pinkish spines and dactyli, and yellowish setae which grow from its fingers. It has a pentagonal carapace which has been measured in males to be as long as 129 mm (5.1 in) and as wide as 124 mm (4.9 in). It is morphologically similar to L. murrayi, but it has a visibly thinner central rostral spine.
