= Hyalurga rufilinea =

Scientific classification
- Kingdom: Animalia
- Phylum: Arthropoda
- Class: Insecta
- Order: Lepidoptera
- Superfamily: Noctuoidea
- Family: Erebidae
- Subfamily: Arctiinae
- Genus: Hyalurga
- Species: H. rufilinea

Binomial name
- Hyalurga rufilinea (Walker, [1865])

Synonyms
- Laurona rufilinea Walker, [1865]

Species of moth

Hyalurga rufilinea is a moth of the family Erebidae. It was described by Francis Walker in 1865. It is found in Brazil.
