= Hyalurga whiteleyi =

Scientific classification
- Domain: Eukaryota
- Kingdom: Animalia
- Phylum: Arthropoda
- Class: Insecta
- Order: Lepidoptera
- Superfamily: Noctuoidea
- Family: Erebidae
- Subfamily: Arctiinae
- Genus: Hyalurga
- Species: H. whiteleyi

Binomial name
- Hyalurga whiteleyi H. Druce, 1911

Species of moth

Hyalurga whiteleyi is a moth of the family Erebidae. It was described by Herbert Druce in 1911. It is found in Ecuador and Peru.
