= Hyalurga modesta =

Scientific classification
- Domain: Eukaryota
- Kingdom: Animalia
- Phylum: Arthropoda
- Class: Insecta
- Order: Lepidoptera
- Superfamily: Noctuoidea
- Family: Erebidae
- Subfamily: Arctiinae
- Genus: Hyalurga
- Species: H. modesta

Binomial name
- Hyalurga modesta Möschler, 1878

Species of moth

Hyalurga modesta is a moth of the family Erebidae. It was described by Heinrich Benno Möschler in 1878. It is found in Suriname and French Guiana.
