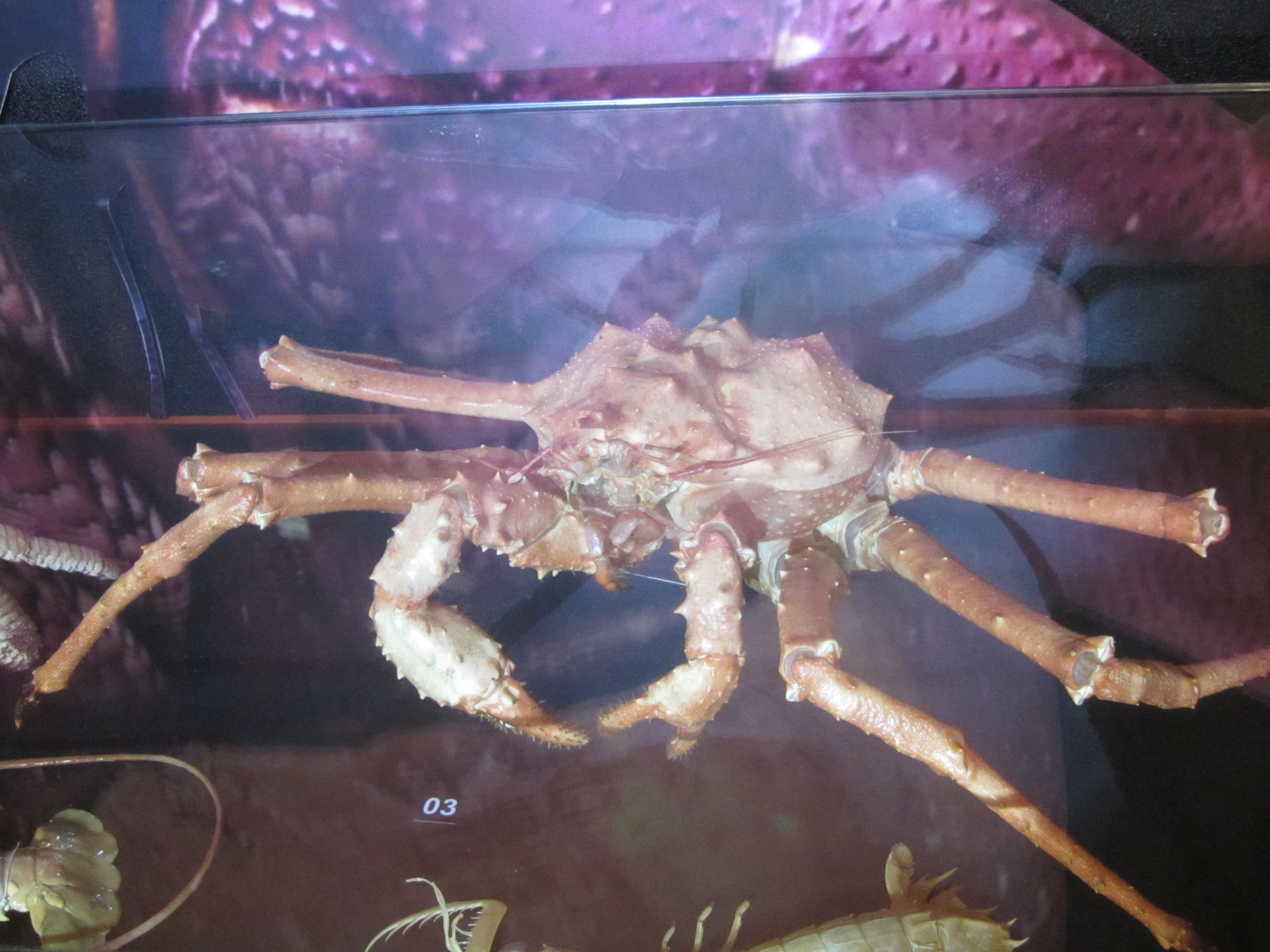

Scientific classification
- Kingdom: Animalia
- Phylum: Arthropoda
- Class: Malacostraca
- Order: Decapoda
- Suborder: Pleocyemata
- Infraorder: Anomura
- Family: Lithodidae
- Genus: Lithodes
- Species: L. turritus

Binomial name
- Lithodes turritus Ortmann, 1892

= Lithodes turritus =

Species of king crab

Lithodes turritus is a species of king crab. It is found in Japan, the East China Sea, Taiwan, and the Philippines at depths from 300–812 metres (984–2,664 ft).
