= Hyalurga partita =

Scientific classification
- Kingdom: Animalia
- Phylum: Arthropoda
- Class: Insecta
- Order: Lepidoptera
- Superfamily: Noctuoidea
- Family: Erebidae
- Subfamily: Arctiinae
- Genus: Hyalurga
- Species: H. partita

Binomial name
- Hyalurga partita (Walker, 1854)

Synonyms
- Dioptis partita Walker, 1854; Hyalurga transita Möschler, 1878

Species of moth

Hyalurga partita is a moth of the family Erebidae. It was described by Francis Walker in 1854. It is found in Brazil, Suriname, French Guiana and Venezuela.
