= Hyalurga uria =

Scientific classification
- Domain: Eukaryota
- Kingdom: Animalia
- Phylum: Arthropoda
- Class: Insecta
- Order: Lepidoptera
- Superfamily: Noctuoidea
- Family: Erebidae
- Subfamily: Arctiinae
- Genus: Hyalurga
- Species: H. uria

Binomial name
- Hyalurga uria Butler, 1871

Species of moth

Hyalurga uria is a moth of the family Erebidae. It was described by Arthur Gardiner Butler in 1871. It is found in Peru, Panama and the Amazon region.
