= Hyalurga discozellularis =

Scientific classification
- Domain: Eukaryota
- Kingdom: Animalia
- Phylum: Arthropoda
- Class: Insecta
- Order: Lepidoptera
- Superfamily: Noctuoidea
- Family: Erebidae
- Subfamily: Arctiinae
- Genus: Hyalurga
- Species: H. discozellularis

Binomial name
- Hyalurga discozellularis Strand, 1921

Species of moth

Hyalurga discozellularis is a moth of the family Erebidae. It was described by Strand in 1921. It is found in Venezuela.
