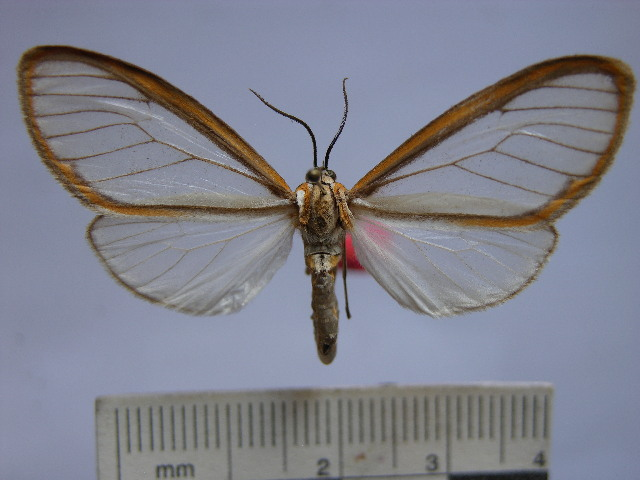

Scientific classification
- Domain: Eukaryota
- Kingdom: Animalia
- Phylum: Arthropoda
- Class: Insecta
- Order: Lepidoptera
- Superfamily: Noctuoidea
- Family: Erebidae
- Subfamily: Arctiinae
- Genus: Hyalurga
- Species: H. sixola

Binomial name
- Hyalurga sixola Schaus, 1910

= Hyalurga sixola =

Species of moth

Hyalurga sixola is a moth of the family Erebidae. It was described by William Schaus in 1910. It is found in Ecuador, French Guiana, Guatemala, Costa Rica and Mexico.
