= Hyalurga cinctella =

Scientific classification
- Domain: Eukaryota
- Kingdom: Animalia
- Phylum: Arthropoda
- Class: Insecta
- Order: Lepidoptera
- Superfamily: Noctuoidea
- Family: Erebidae
- Subfamily: Arctiinae
- Genus: Hyalurga
- Species: H. cinctella

Binomial name
- Hyalurga cinctella Strand, 1911

Species of moth

Hyalurga cinctella is a moth of the family Erebidae. It was described by Strand in 1911. It is found in Ecuador.
