= Hyalurga albovitrea =

Scientific classification
- Kingdom: Animalia
- Phylum: Arthropoda
- Class: Insecta
- Order: Lepidoptera
- Superfamily: Noctuoidea
- Family: Erebidae
- Subfamily: Arctiinae
- Genus: Hyalurga
- Species: H. albovitrea

Binomial name
- Hyalurga albovitrea Walker, [1865]

Synonyms
- Hyalurga irregularis Felder, 1874

Species of moth

Hyalurga albovitrea is a moth of the family Erebidae. It was described by Francis Walker in 1865. It is found in Brazil.
