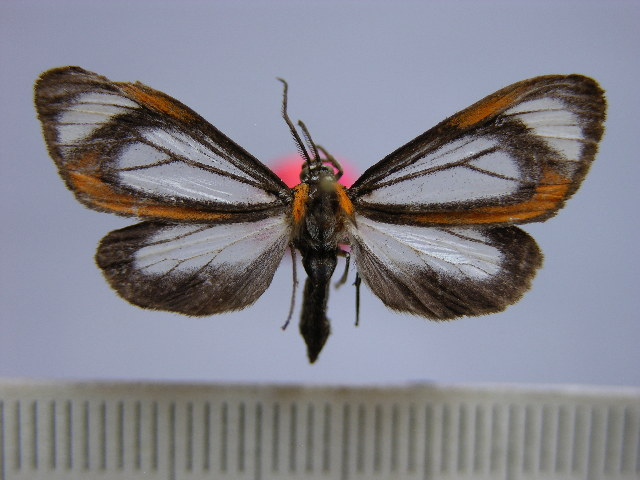

Scientific classification
- Domain: Eukaryota
- Kingdom: Animalia
- Phylum: Arthropoda
- Class: Insecta
- Order: Lepidoptera
- Superfamily: Noctuoidea
- Family: Erebidae
- Subfamily: Arctiinae
- Genus: Hyalurga
- Species: H. peritta

Binomial name
- Hyalurga peritta Hering, 1925

= Hyalurga peritta =

Species of moth

Hyalurga peritta is a moth of the family Erebidae. It was described by Hering in 1925. It is found in Brazil and Paraguay.
