= Lithodes ahyongi =

Scientific classification
- Kingdom: Animalia
- Phylum: Arthropoda
- Class: Malacostraca
- Order: Decapoda
- Suborder: Pleocyemata
- Infraorder: Anomura
- Family: Lithodidae
- Genus: Lithodes
- Species: L. ahyongi

Binomial name
- Lithodes ahyongi Takeda, 2018

Species of king crab

Lithodes ahyongi is a species of king crab. As of 2018, one specimen has been identified, found between a depth of 1,000 and 1,500 m (3,300 and 4,900 ft) in Indonesia's Seram Sea.

== Description ==
Lithodes ahyongi's single known specimen is an adult female. It is similar in appearance to Lithodes richeri, notably sharing its long rostrum. The specimen's carapace is 175 mm (6.9 in) long (Note: Using postorbital carapace length, which excludes the rostrum.) and 165 mm (6.5 in) wide. Its first and second walking legs are 415 mm (16.3 in) and 445 mm (17.5 in) long, respectively. (Note: The specimen's third pair of walking legs is incomplete.)

== Distribution ==
Lithodes ahyongi was found by local fishermen in October 1993. It was fished off Wahai on the northern coast of Seram Island in Indonesia's Maluku province at a depth between 1,000 and 1,500 m (3,300 and 4,900 ft).

== Taxonomy ==
Lithodes ahyongi was described in 2018 by carcinologist Masatsune Takeda. It is named for carcinologist Shane T. Ahyong, whose work in 2010 identified that the species' holotype had been misidentified as Lithodes richeri.

== See also ==
- Lithodes ceramensis, also found in the Seram Sea
