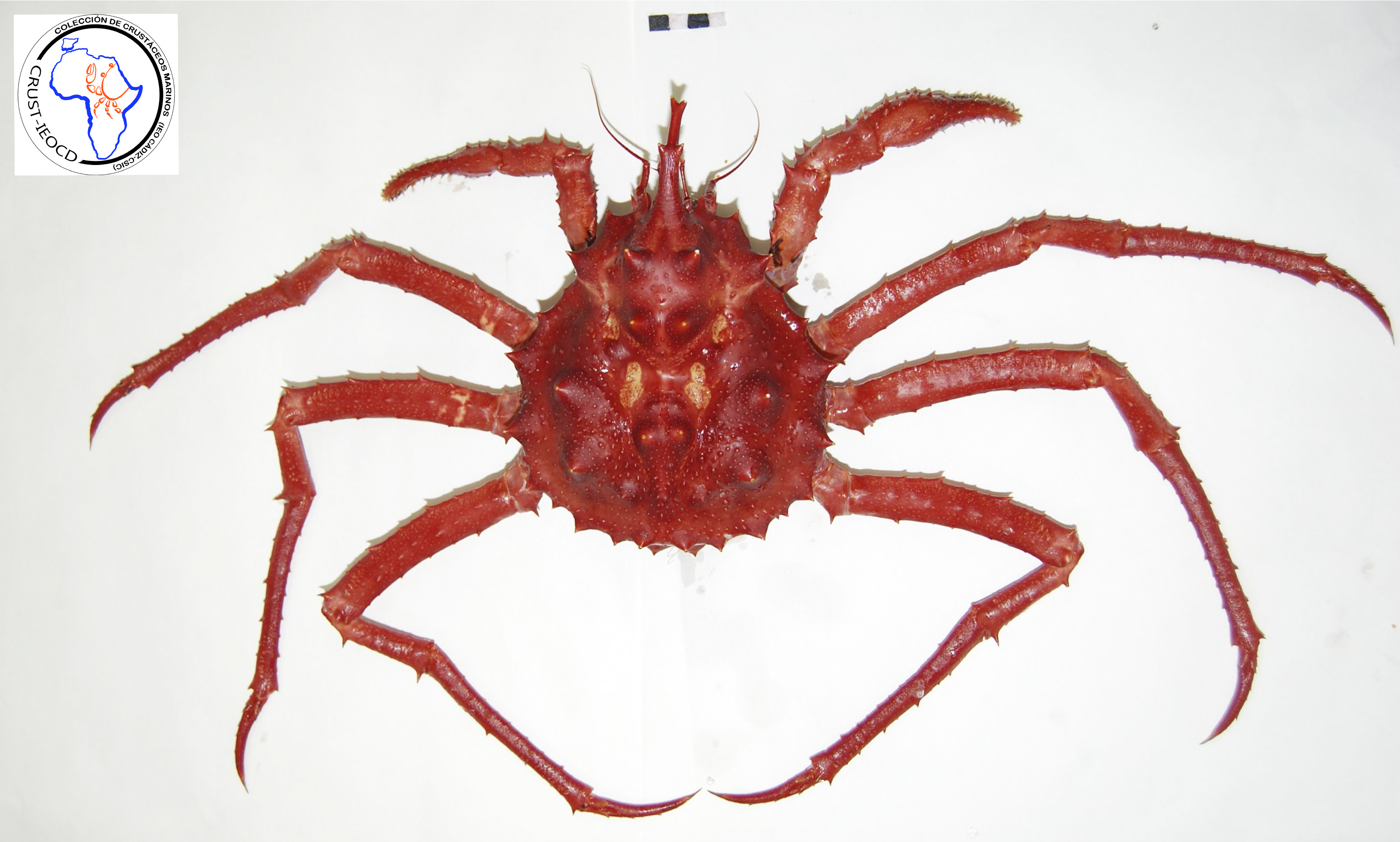

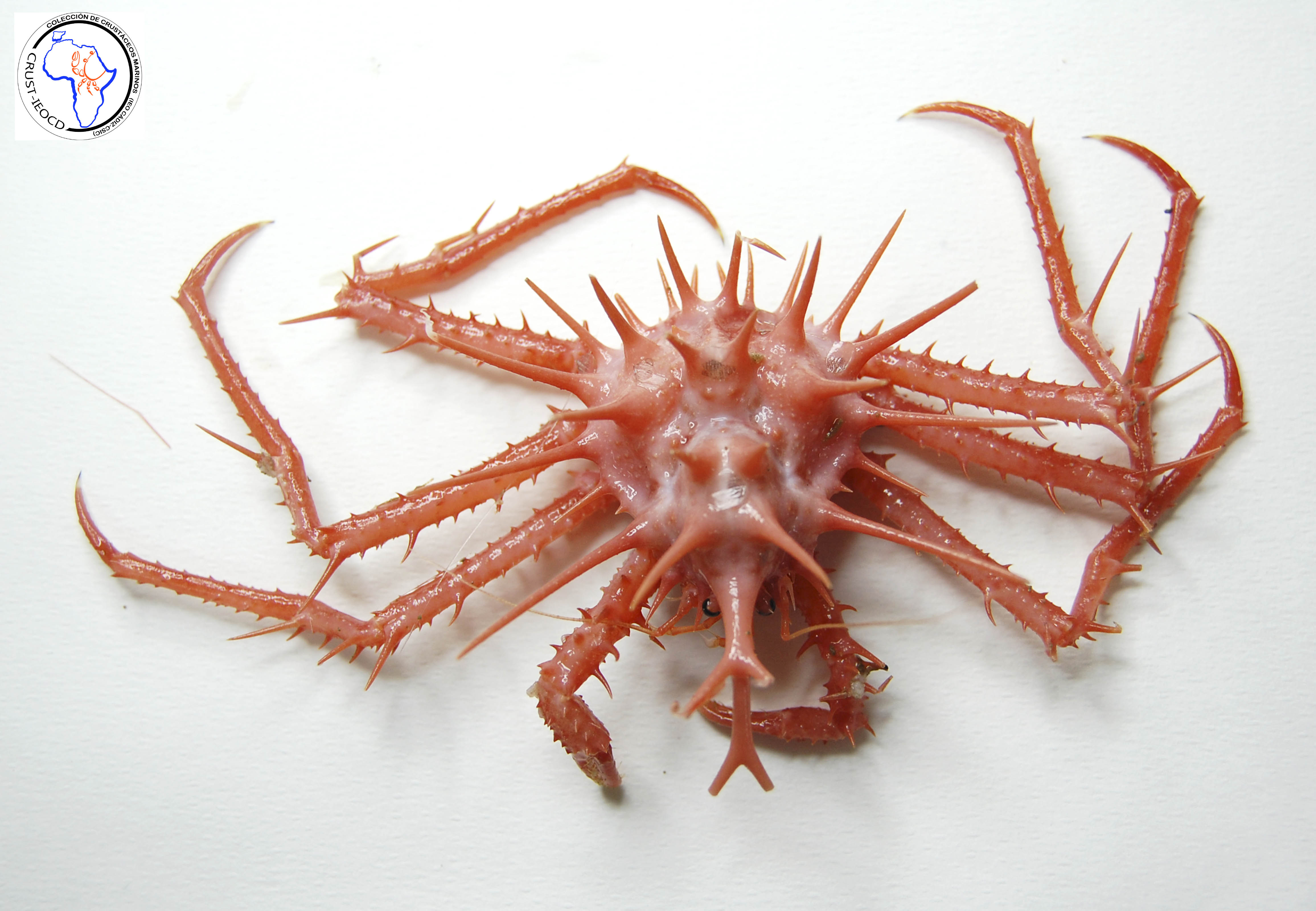
- Adult specimen (top); juvenile specimen (bottom)

Scientific classification
- Kingdom: Animalia
- Phylum: Arthropoda
- Clade: Pancrustacea
- Class: Malacostraca
- Order: Decapoda
- Suborder: Pleocyemata
- Infraorder: Anomura
- Family: Lithodidae
- Genus: Lithodes
- Species: L. mamillifer

Binomial name
- Lithodes mamillifer Macpherson, 1988

= Lithodes mamillifer =

Species of king crab

Lithodes mamillifer is a species of king crab. It has been found between the east coast of South Africa and the west coast of Madagascar at depths of 550–800 m (1,800–2,620 ft).
