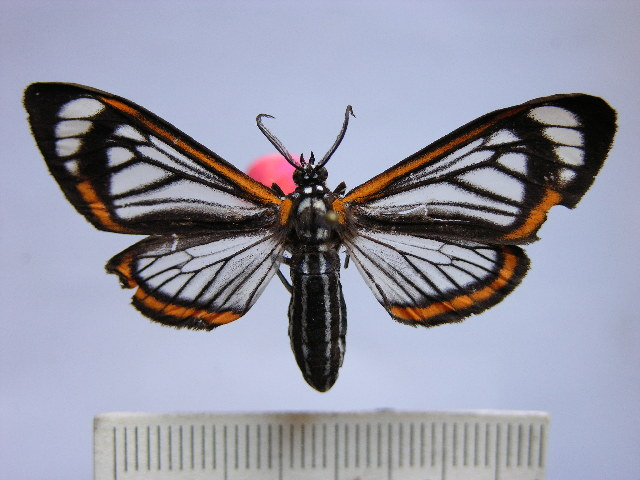

Scientific classification
- Domain: Eukaryota
- Kingdom: Animalia
- Phylum: Arthropoda
- Class: Insecta
- Order: Lepidoptera
- Superfamily: Noctuoidea
- Family: Erebidae
- Subfamily: Arctiinae
- Genus: Hyalurga
- Species: H. lauronoides

Binomial name
- Hyalurga lauronoides Hering, 1925

= Hyalurga lauronoides =

Species of moth

Hyalurga lauronoides is a moth of the family Erebidae. It was described by Hering in 1925. It is found in French Guiana.
