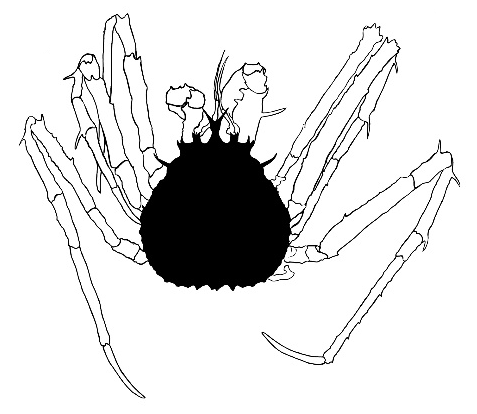

Scientific classification
- Kingdom: Animalia
- Phylum: Arthropoda
- Class: Malacostraca
- Order: Decapoda
- Suborder: Pleocyemata
- Infraorder: Anomura
- Family: Lithodidae
- Genus: Lithodes
- Species: L. manningi

Binomial name
- Lithodes manningi Macpherson, 1988

= Lithodes manningi =

Species of king crab

Lithodes manningi is a species of king crab. It has been found in Dominica and French Guiana at depths of 640–777 m (2,100–2,549 ft).
