= Hyalurga batesi =

Scientific classification
- Domain: Eukaryota
- Kingdom: Animalia
- Phylum: Arthropoda
- Class: Insecta
- Order: Lepidoptera
- Superfamily: Noctuoidea
- Family: Erebidae
- Subfamily: Arctiinae
- Genus: Hyalurga
- Species: H. batesi

Binomial name
- Hyalurga batesi (H. Druce, 1893)

Synonyms
- Lauron batesi H. Druce, 1893

Species of moth

Hyalurga batesi is a moth of the family Erebidae. It was described by Herbert Druce in 1893. It is found in Brazil.
