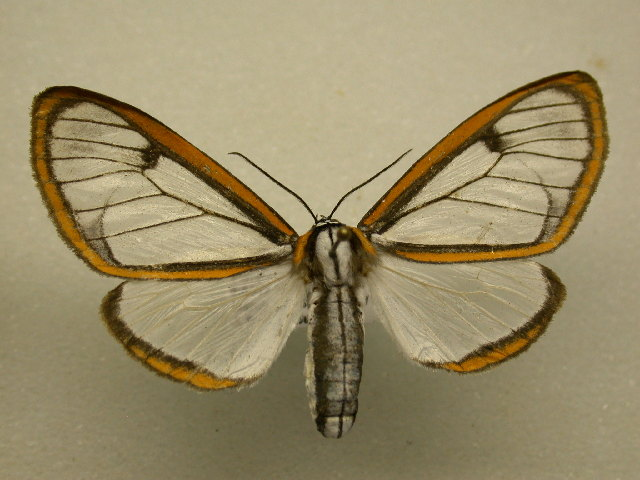
- Hyalurga urioides

Scientific classification
- Kingdom: Animalia
- Phylum: Arthropoda
- Clade: Pancrustacea
- Class: Insecta
- Order: Lepidoptera
- Superfamily: Noctuoidea
- Family: Erebidae
- Subfamily: Arctiinae
- Tribe: Arctiini
- Subtribe: Pericopina
- Genus: Hyalurga; Hübner, [1819]

Synonyms
- Lauron Walker, 1854; Gyara Walker, 1855; Ditaxis Boisduval, 1870; Cletorna Boisduval, 1870

= Hyalurga =

Genus of moths

Hyalurga is a genus of tiger moths in the family Erebidae. The genus was erected by Jacob Hübner in 1819.

== Species ==
- Hyalurga albovitrea Walker, [1865]
- Hyalurga batesi (Druce, 1893)
- Hyalurga caralis Druce, 1885
- Hyalurga chariata (Druce, 1893)
- Hyalurga choma (Druce, 1893)
- Hyalurga chthonophyle (Druce, 1885)
- Hyalurga cinctella Strand, 1911
- Hyalurga clara (Butler, 1873)
- Hyalurga discozellularis Strand, 1921
- Hyalurga dorsilinea Hering, 1925
- Hyalurga fenestra (Linnaeus, 1758)
- Hyalurga fenestrata (Walker, 1855)
- Hyalurga grandis Druce, 1911
- Hyalurga halizoa (Druce, 1907)
- Hyalurga hoppi Hering, 1925
- Hyalurga lauronoides Hering, 1925
- Hyalurga leucophaea (Walker, 1854)
- Hyalurga leucophlebia Hering, 1925
- Hyalurga melania Hering, 1925
- Hyalurga modesta Möschler, 1878
- Hyalurga mysis (Erichson, 1848)
- Hyalurga noguei Dognin, 1891
- Hyalurga orthotaenia Hering, 1925
- Hyalurga osiba (Druce, 1893)
- Hyalurga padua (Druce, 1893)
- Hyalurga partita (Walker, 1854)
- Hyalurga peritta Hering, 1925
- Hyalurga pura Butler, 1876
- Hyalurga putumayana Hering, 1925
- Hyalurga rica (Hübner, [1831])
- Hyalurga rufilinea (Walker, [1865])
- Hyalurga scotina Hering, 1925
- Hyalurga sixola Schaus, 1910
- Hyalurga sora (Boisduval, 1870)
- Hyalurga subafflicta (Walker, [1865])
- Hyalurga subnormalis Dyar, 1914
- Hyalurga supposita Hering, 1925
- Hyalurga syma (Walker, 1854)
- Hyalurga uria Butler, 1871
- Hyalurga urioides Schaus, 1910
- Hyalurga vinosa (Drury, [1773])
- Hyalurga whiteleyi Druce, 1911
- Hyalurga zetila (Boisduval, 1870)
