= Hyalurga clara =

Scientific classification
- Domain: Eukaryota
- Kingdom: Animalia
- Phylum: Arthropoda
- Class: Insecta
- Order: Lepidoptera
- Superfamily: Noctuoidea
- Family: Erebidae
- Subfamily: Arctiinae
- Genus: Hyalurga
- Species: H. clara

Binomial name
- Hyalurga clara (Butler, 1873)

Synonyms
- Gyara clara Butler, 1873

Species of moth

Hyalurga clara is a moth of the family Erebidae. It was described by Arthur Gardiner Butler in 1873. It is found in Brazil.
