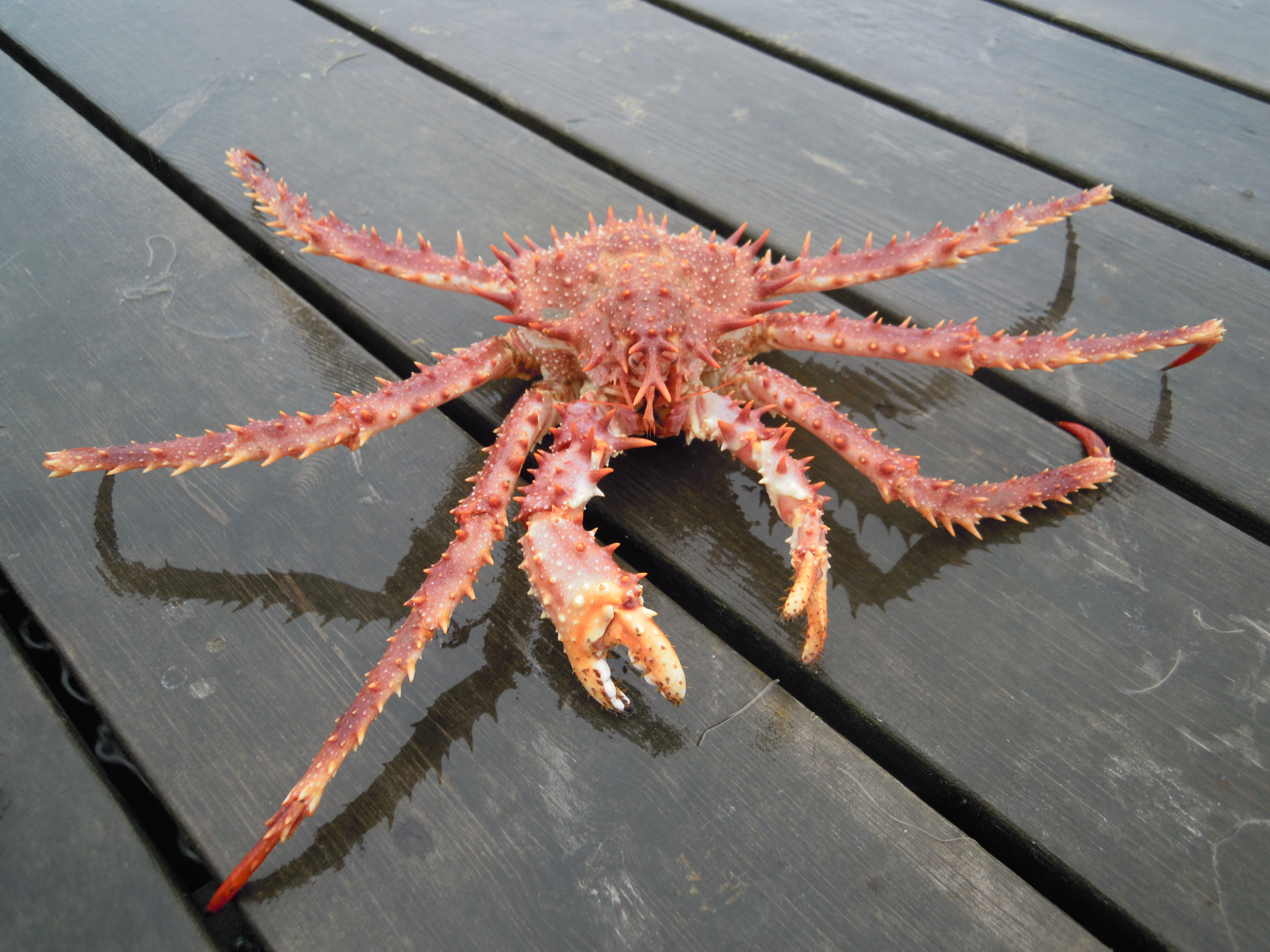

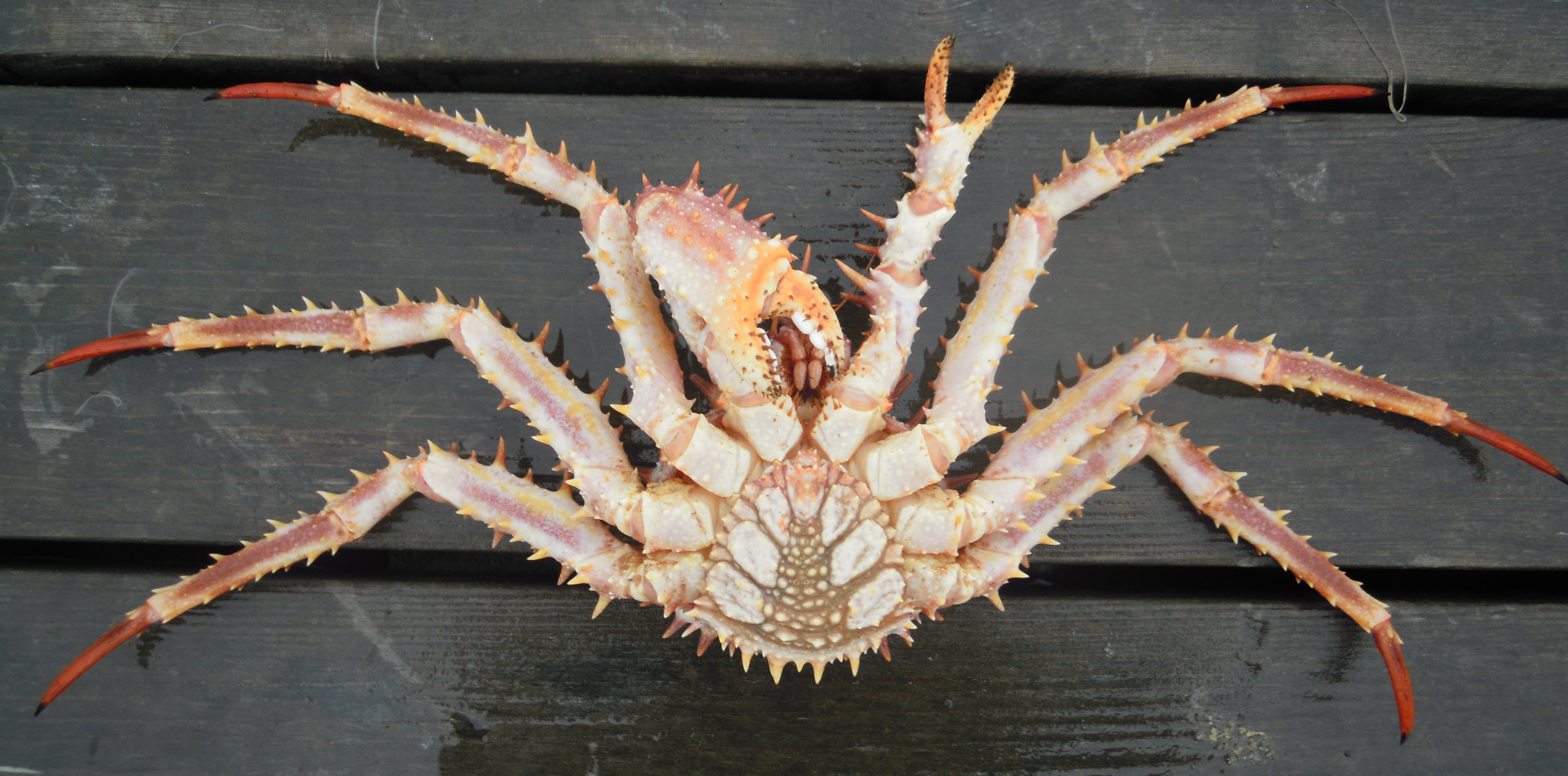
- Lithodes maja caught in Norway

Scientific classification
- Kingdom: Animalia
- Phylum: Arthropoda
- Class: Malacostraca
- Order: Decapoda
- Suborder: Pleocyemata
- Infraorder: Anomura
- Family: Lithodidae
- Genus: Lithodes
- Species: L. maja

Binomial name
- Lithodes maja (Linnaeus, 1758)

Synonyms
- Cancer horridus Pennant, 1777; Cancer Maja Linnaeus, 1758; Cancer spinosus Ascanius, 1776; Cancer spinosus amboinensis Seba, 1759; Inachus maja (Linnaeus, 1758); Lithodes arctica Latreille, 1806; Lithodes dubius Brandt, 1848; Lithodes maia (Linnaeus, 1758); Maia vulgaris Bosc, 1801; Maja eriocheles Lamarck, 1801; Parthenope maja (Linnaeus, 1758)

= Lithodes maja =

Species of king crab

Lithodes maja, also known as the Norway king crab or northern stone crab, is a species of king crab that occurs in colder North Atlantic waters off Europe and North America. It is found along the entire coast of Norway, including Svalbard, ranging south into the North Sea and Kattegat, the northern half of the British Isles (with a few records off southwest England), and around the Faroe Islands, Iceland, and off south-eastern Greenland. In the West Atlantic, it ranges from the Davis Strait between Greenland and Canada south to The Carolinas in the United States.

The carapace is almost circular and may reach a width of up to 13–14 cm (5.1–5.5 in). The whole body is brown or orange and is covered with large spikes. It lives on both soft and hard bottoms, at depths of 10 to 1,000 m (30–3,280 ft). Like most king crabs, females are asymmetrical, with the left side of the abdomen considerably larger than the right, although specimens with the reverse of this are occasionally found.

The low rate of egg production by this species, in comparison to species fished in the North Pacific, limits its abundance, making it unsuitable for commercial exploitation.

Larval development is lecithotrophic and takes about 7 weeks at a constant temperature of 9 °C (48 °F).

== See also ==
- Red king crab
