= Hyalurga halizoa =

Scientific classification
- Domain: Eukaryota
- Kingdom: Animalia
- Phylum: Arthropoda
- Class: Insecta
- Order: Lepidoptera
- Superfamily: Noctuoidea
- Family: Erebidae
- Subfamily: Arctiinae
- Genus: Hyalurga
- Species: H. halizoa

Binomial name
- Hyalurga halizoa (H. Druce, 1907)

Synonyms
- Lauron halizoa H. Druce, 1907

Species of moth

Hyalurga halizoa is a moth of the family Erebidae. It was described by Herbert Druce in 1907. It is found on Jamaica.
