= Hyalurga zetila =

Scientific classification
- Domain: Eukaryota
- Kingdom: Animalia
- Phylum: Arthropoda
- Class: Insecta
- Order: Lepidoptera
- Superfamily: Noctuoidea
- Family: Erebidae
- Subfamily: Arctiinae
- Genus: Hyalurga
- Species: H. zetila

Binomial name
- Hyalurga zetila (Boisduval, 1870)

Synonyms
- Epilais zetila Boisduval, 1870

Species of moth

Hyalurga zetila is a moth of the family Erebidae. It was described by Jean Baptiste Boisduval in 1870. It is found in Guatemala.
