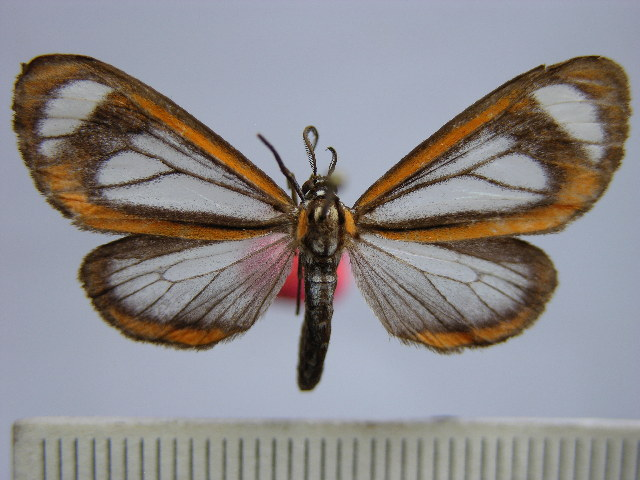
- An image of the moth, this moth has orange, black and white wings

Scientific classification
- Kingdom: Animalia
- Phylum: Arthropoda
- Class: Insecta
- Order: Lepidoptera
- Superfamily: Noctuoidea
- Family: Erebidae
- Subfamily: Arctiinae
- Genus: Hyalurga
- Species: H. leucophaea

Binomial name
- Hyalurga leucophaea (Walker, 1854)

Synonyms
- Lauron leucophaea Walker, 1854; Hyalurga gabrielis Bryk, 1953

= Hyalurga leucophaea =

Species of moth

Hyalurga leucophaea is a moth of the family Erebidae. It was described by Francis Walker in 1854. It is found in Venezuela and Peru.

== Subspecies ==
- Hyalurga leucophaea leucophaea (Venezuela)
- Hyalurga leucophaea gabrielis Bryk, 1953 (Peru)
