= Lithodes longispina =

Scientific classification
- Domain: Eukaryota
- Kingdom: Animalia
- Phylum: Arthropoda
- Class: Malacostraca
- Order: Decapoda
- Suborder: Pleocyemata
- Infraorder: Anomura
- Family: Lithodidae
- Genus: Lithodes
- Species: L. longispina

Binomial name
- Lithodes longispina Sakai, 1971

Species of king crab

Lithodes longispina is a species of king crab. It has been found in Japan and Taiwan. Before 2010, its reach was thought to be much greater than presently understood, such as Australia, New Zealand, and Guam. It has also allegedly been sighted in the Northwestern Hawaiian Islands.

It closely resembles L. megacantha, L. formosae, and L. paulayi.
