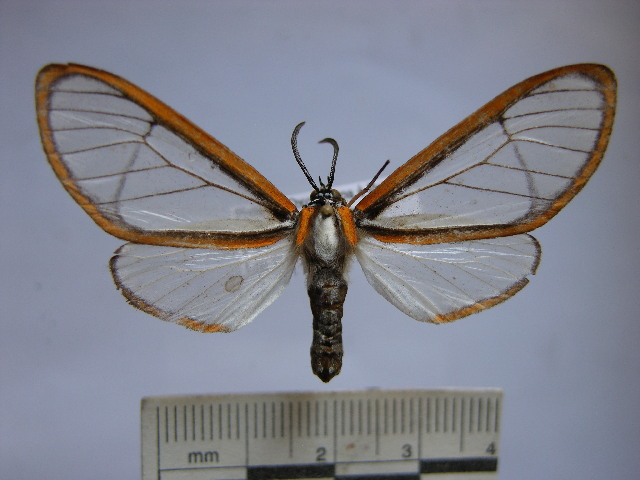

Scientific classification
- Domain: Eukaryota
- Kingdom: Animalia
- Phylum: Arthropoda
- Class: Insecta
- Order: Lepidoptera
- Superfamily: Noctuoidea
- Family: Erebidae
- Subfamily: Arctiinae
- Genus: Hyalurga
- Species: H. noguei

Binomial name
- Hyalurga noguei Dognin, 1891

= Hyalurga noguei =

Species of moth

Hyalurga noguei is a moth of the family Erebidae. It was described by Paul Dognin in 1891. It is found in Ecuador and Peru.
