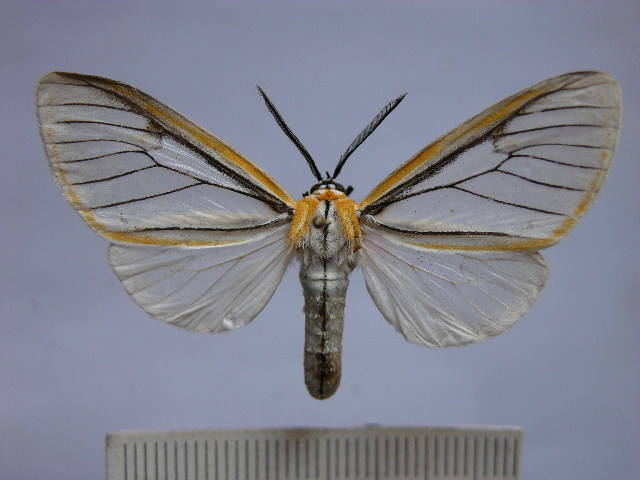

Scientific classification
- Kingdom: Animalia
- Phylum: Arthropoda
- Class: Insecta
- Order: Lepidoptera
- Superfamily: Noctuoidea
- Family: Erebidae
- Subfamily: Arctiinae
- Genus: Hyalurga
- Species: H. fenestrata

Binomial name
- Hyalurga fenestrata (Walker, 1855)

Synonyms
- Gyara fenestrata Walker, 1855

= Hyalurga fenestrata =

Species of moth

Hyalurga fenestrata is a moth of the family Erebidae. It was described by Francis Walker in 1855. It is found in Brazil and Paraguay.
