= Lithodes ceramensis =

Scientific classification
- Domain: Eukaryota
- Kingdom: Animalia
- Phylum: Arthropoda
- Class: Malacostraca
- Order: Decapoda
- Suborder: Pleocyemata
- Infraorder: Anomura
- Family: Lithodidae
- Genus: Lithodes
- Species: L. ceramensis

Binomial name
- Lithodes ceramensis Takeda & Nagai, 2004

Species of king crab

Lithodes ceramensis is a species of king crab. It has been found somewhere between a depth of 1,000 and 1,500 m (3,300 and 4,900 ft) in Indonesia's Seram Sea. It is notable for being left-handed, whereas lithodids are typically right-handed. It is named after the Seram Sea where its holotype was found.

== See also ==
- Lithodes ahyongi, also found in the Seram Sea
