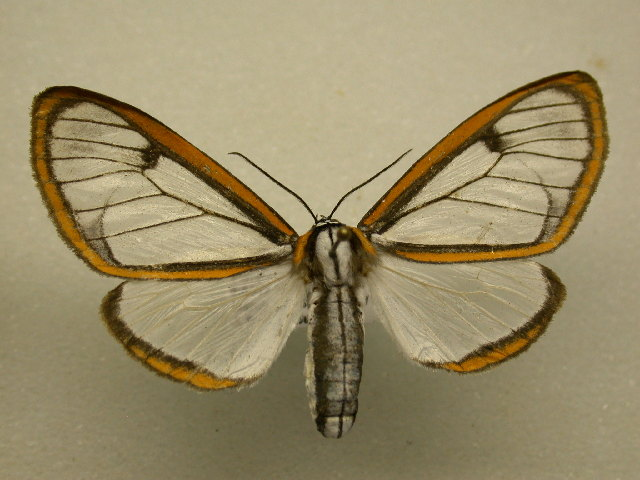

Scientific classification
- Kingdom: Animalia
- Phylum: Arthropoda
- Clade: Pancrustacea
- Class: Insecta
- Order: Lepidoptera
- Superfamily: Noctuoidea
- Family: Erebidae
- Subfamily: Arctiinae
- Genus: Hyalurga
- Species: H. urioides

Binomial name
- Hyalurga urioides Schaus, 1910

= Hyalurga urioides =

Species of moth

Hyalurga urioides is a moth of the family Erebidae. It was described by William Schaus in 1910. It is found in Costa Rica, Guatemala, Belize, Panama, Ecuador and Peru.
