= Hyalurga caralis =

Scientific classification
- Domain: Eukaryota
- Kingdom: Animalia
- Phylum: Arthropoda
- Class: Insecta
- Order: Lepidoptera
- Superfamily: Noctuoidea
- Family: Erebidae
- Subfamily: Arctiinae
- Genus: Hyalurga
- Species: H. caralis

Binomial name
- Hyalurga caralis H. Druce, 1885

Species of moth

Hyalurga caralis is a moth of the family Erebidae. It was described by Herbert Druce in 1885. It is found in Ecuador.
