= Lithodes robertsoni =

Conservation status
- Naturally Uncommon (NZ TCS)

Scientific classification
- Kingdom: Animalia
- Phylum: Arthropoda
- Class: Malacostraca
- Order: Decapoda
- Suborder: Pleocyemata
- Infraorder: Anomura
- Family: Lithodidae
- Genus: Lithodes
- Species: L. robertsoni

Binomial name
- Lithodes robertsoni Ahyong, 2010

Species of king crab

Lithodes robertsoni is a species of king crab. It has been found in New Zealand at depths between 935–1,259 m (3,068–4,131 ft). It is distributed from as far north as the Challenger Plateau to as far south as the Snares Islands. The largest yet-examined specimen is the male holotype whose carapace measures 128.1 mm (5.04 in) in length (Note: Using postorbital carapace length (pcl), which is measured from the rear margin of the orbit and therefore excludes the rostrum. Including the rostrum, the carapace is 186.6 mm (7.35 in) long.) and 117.0 mm (4.61 in) in width.
