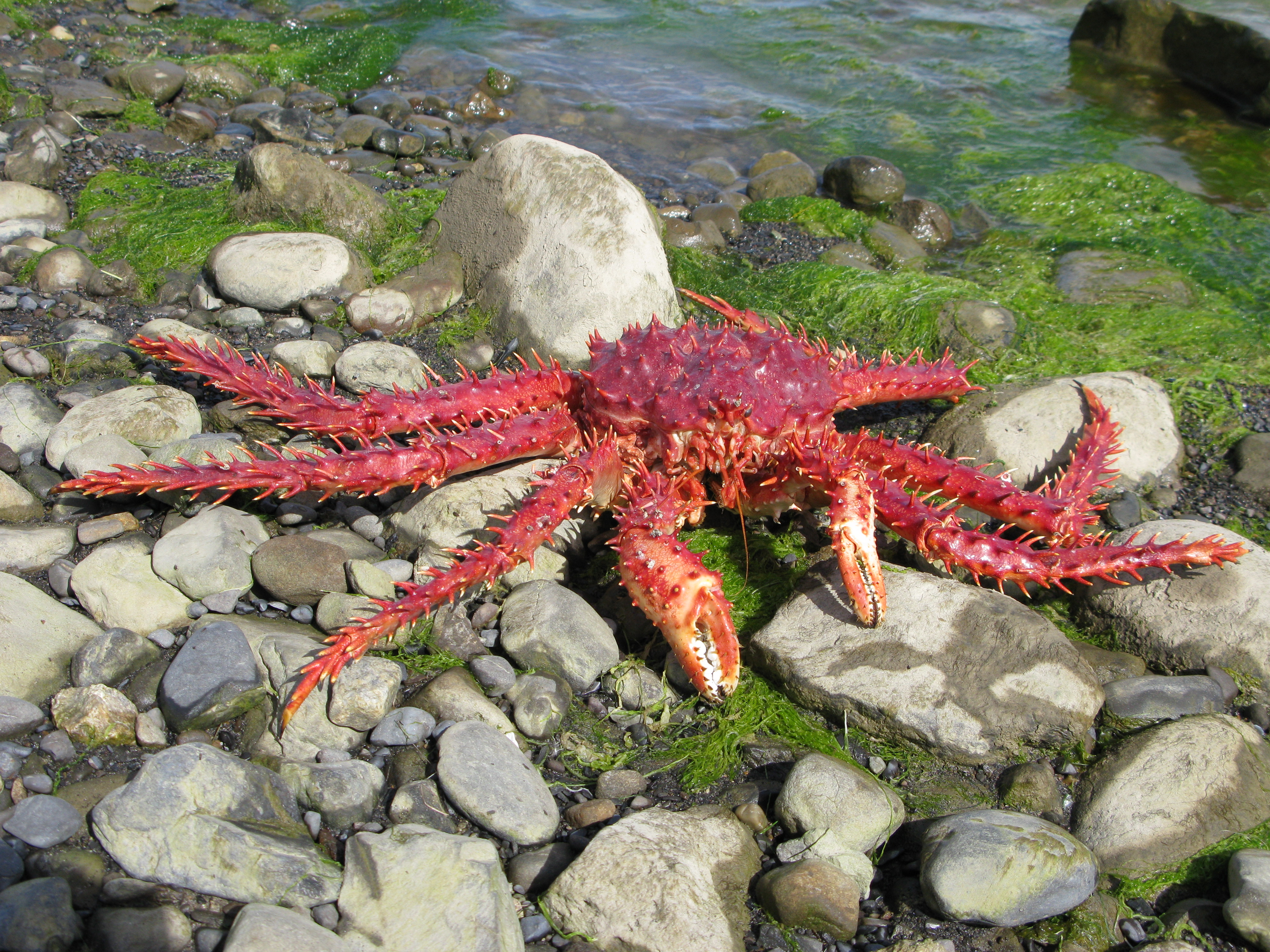
- Lithodes santolla

Scientific classification
- Kingdom: Animalia
- Phylum: Arthropoda
- Clade: Pancrustacea
- Class: Malacostraca
- Order: Decapoda
- Suborder: Pleocyemata
- Infraorder: Anomura
- Family: Lithodidae
- Subfamily: Lithodinae
- Genus: Lithodes; Latreille, 1806

Type species
- Lithodes maja (Linnaeus, 1758)

Synonyms
- Pseudolithodes Birstein & Vinogradov, 1972

= Lithodes =

Genus of king crabs

Lithodes is a genus of king crabs. Today there are about 30 recognized species, but others formerly included in this genus have been moved to Neolithodes and Paralomis. They are found in oceans around the world, ranging from shallow to deep waters, but mostly at depths of 100–1,000 m (300–3,300 ft). They are restricted to relatively cold waters, meaning that they only occur at high depths at low latitudes, but some species also shallower at high latitudes. They are medium to large crabs, and some species are or were targeted by fisheries.

== Species ==
Lithodes contains the following species:

Image	Scientific name	Common name	Distribution	References
	Lithodes aequispinus Benedict, 1895	Golden king crab	North Pacific	
	Lithodes ahyongi Takeda, 2018		Seram Sea	
	Lithodes aotearoa Ahyong, 2010		New Zealand	
	Lithodes australiensis Ahyong, 2010		Southeastern Australia	
	Lithodes ceramensis Takeda & Nagai, 2004		Seram Sea	
	Lithodes chaddertoni Ahyong, 2010		Indian Ocean (Naturaliste Plateau or Broken Ridge)	
	Lithodes confundens Macpherson, 1988		Southwestern Atlantic	
	Lithodes couesi Benedict, 1895	Scarlet king crab	Northeastern Pacific Ocean and Burdwood Bank	
	Lithodes ferox Filhol, 1885	Fierce king crab	Southeastern Atlantic Ocean	
	Lithodes formosae Ahyong & Chan, 2010		Taiwan	
	Lithodes galapagensis Hall & Thatje, 2009		The Galápagos Islands	
	Lithodes jessica Ahyong, 2010		Southern Lord Howe Rise	
	Lithodes longispina Sakai, 1971		Japan and Taiwan	
	Lithodes macquariae Ahyong, 2010		Macquarie Island, the Auckland Islands, and Peter I Island	
	Lithodes maja (Linnaeus, 1758)	Norway king crab, northern stone crab	North Atlantic	
	Lithodes mamillifer Macpherson, 1988		Between South Africa and Madagascar	
	Lithodes manningi Macpherson, 1988		Dominica and French Guiana	
	Lithodes megacantha Macpherson, 1991		French Polynesia	
	Lithodes murrayi Henderson, 1888	Subantarctic stone crab	Southwestern Indian Ocean	
	Lithodes nintokuae Sakai, 1976		Hawaiian–Emperor seamount chain	
	Lithodes panamensis Faxon, 1893		Pacific coast of South America from Panama to northern Chile	
	Lithodes paulayi Macpherson & Chan, 2008		Guam	
	Lithodes rachelae Ahyong, 2010		Southern coast of Australia	
	Lithodes richeri Macpherson, 1990		Vanuatu, New Caledonia, and Australia	
	Lithodes robertsoni Ahyong, 2010		New Zealand	
	Lithodes santolla (Molina, 1782)	Southern king crab, Chilean king crab, centolla	Southern Cone	
	Lithodes turkayi Macpherson, 1988		Pacific Ocean off the coast of Chile, Southern Atlantic Ocean near the Falkland Islands, and Bellingshausen Sea	
	Lithodes turritus Ortmann, 1892		Japan, the East China Sea, Taiwan, and the Philippines	
	Lithodes unicornis Macpherson, 1984		Valdivia Bank, Walvis Ridge	
	Lithodes wiracocha Haig, 1974		Northwestern coast of Peru	
