= Hyalurga syma =

Scientific classification
- Kingdom: Animalia
- Phylum: Arthropoda
- Class: Insecta
- Order: Lepidoptera
- Superfamily: Noctuoidea
- Family: Erebidae
- Subfamily: Arctiinae
- Genus: Hyalurga
- Species: H. syma

Binomial name
- Hyalurga syma (Walker, 1854)

Synonyms
- Lauron syma Walker, 1854; Lauron flammicollis Dognin, 1903; Lauron albiplaga Schaus, 1906

Species of moth

Hyalurga syma is a moth of the family Erebidae. It was described by Francis Walker in 1854. It is found in Brazil.
