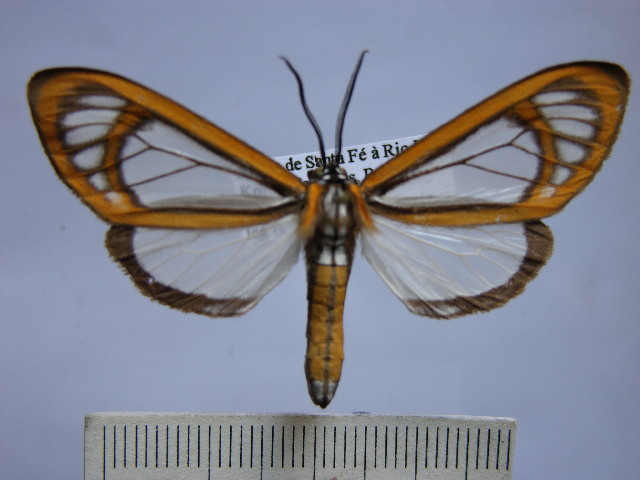

Scientific classification
- Kingdom: Animalia
- Phylum: Arthropoda
- Class: Insecta
- Order: Lepidoptera
- Superfamily: Noctuoidea
- Family: Erebidae
- Subfamily: Arctiinae
- Genus: Hyalurga
- Species: H. fenestra

Binomial name
- Hyalurga fenestra (Linnaeus, 1758)

Synonyms
- Phalaena fenestra Linnaeus, 1758; Sphinx egeon Cramer, [1775]; Hyalurga fenestrigera Hübner, [1819]; Hyalurga amazonica Butler, 1876

= Hyalurga fenestra =

Species of moth

Hyalurga fenestra is a moth of the family Erebidae. It was described by Carl Linnaeus in his 1758 10th edition of Systema Naturae. It is found in Costa Rica, Nicaragua, Panama, Bolivia, Suriname, French Guiana, Brazil, Peru and Venezuela, as well as on the Antilles.
