= Hyalurga grandis =

Scientific classification
- Domain: Eukaryota
- Kingdom: Animalia
- Phylum: Arthropoda
- Class: Insecta
- Order: Lepidoptera
- Superfamily: Noctuoidea
- Family: Erebidae
- Subfamily: Arctiinae
- Genus: Hyalurga
- Species: H. grandis

Binomial name
- Hyalurga grandis H. Druce, 1911

Species of moth

Hyalurga grandis is a moth of the family Erebidae. It was described by Herbert Druce in 1911. It is found in Peru.
