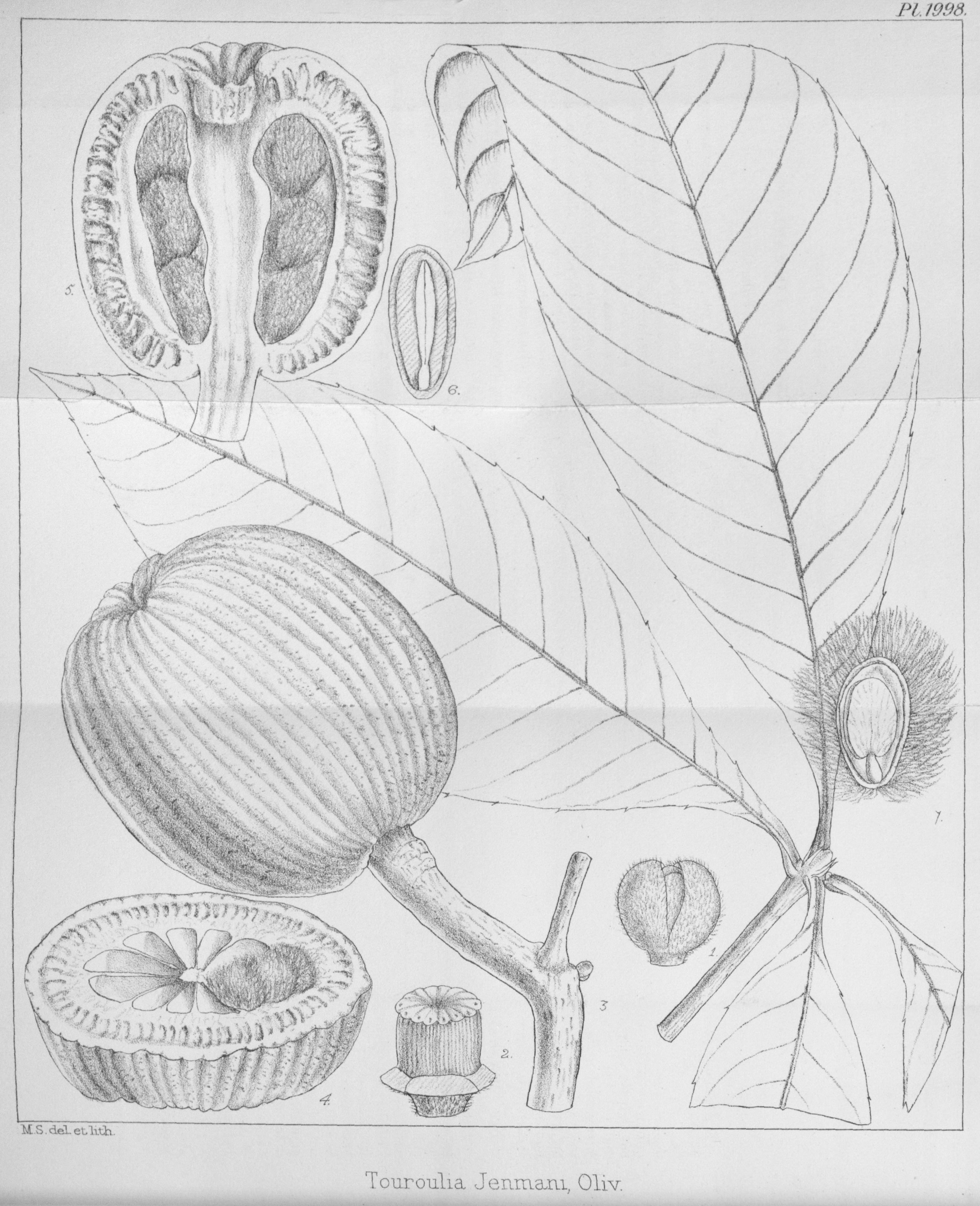
- Lacunaria jenmanii

Scientific classification
- Kingdom: Plantae
- Clade: Tracheophytes
- Clade: Angiosperms
- Clade: Eudicots
- Clade: Rosids
- Order: Malpighiales
- Family: Ochnaceae
- Subfamily: Quiinoideae
- Genus: Lacunaria; Ducke

= Lacunaria =

Genus of flowering plants

Lacunaria is a genus of flowering plants in the family Ochnaceae native to Central America and tropical South America.

== Species ==
As of February 2023, Plants of the World Online accepted the following species:

- Lacunaria crenata (Tul.) A.C.Sm.
- Lacunaria grandiflora Ducke
- Lacunaria grandifolia Ducke
- Lacunaria jenmanii (Oliv.) Ducke
- Lacunaria macrostachya (Tul.) A.C.Sm.
- Lacunaria oppositifolia Pires
- Lacunaria sampaioi Ducke
- Lacunaria umbonata Pires
