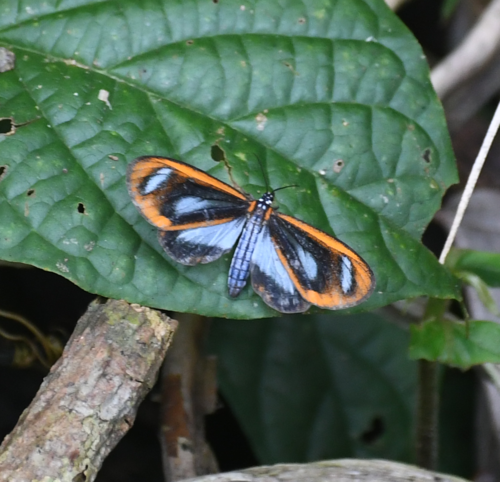

Scientific classification
- Domain: Eukaryota
- Kingdom: Animalia
- Phylum: Arthropoda
- Class: Insecta
- Order: Lepidoptera
- Superfamily: Noctuoidea
- Family: Erebidae
- Subfamily: Arctiinae
- Genus: Hyalurga
- Species: H. osiba

Binomial name
- Hyalurga osiba (H. Druce, 1893)

Synonyms
- Lauron osiba H. Druce, 1893

= Hyalurga osiba =

Species of moth

Hyalurga osiba is a species of moth in the family Erebidae. It was first described by Herbert Druce in 1893. It is found in Ecuador.
