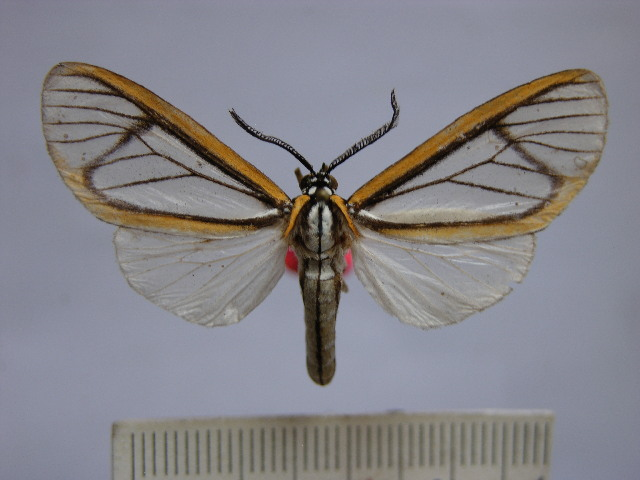

Scientific classification
- Domain: Eukaryota
- Kingdom: Animalia
- Phylum: Arthropoda
- Class: Insecta
- Order: Lepidoptera
- Superfamily: Noctuoidea
- Family: Erebidae
- Subfamily: Arctiinae
- Genus: Hyalurga
- Species: H. mysis

Binomial name
- Hyalurga mysis (Erichson, 1848)

Synonyms
- Glaucopis mysis Erichson, 1848

= Hyalurga mysis =

Species of moth

Hyalurga mysis is a moth of the family Erebidae. It was described by Wilhelm Ferdinand Erichson in 1848. It is found in Guyana.
