= Hyalurga rica =

Scientific classification
- Kingdom: Animalia
- Phylum: Arthropoda
- Clade: Pancrustacea
- Class: Insecta
- Order: Lepidoptera
- Superfamily: Noctuoidea
- Family: Erebidae
- Subfamily: Arctiinae
- Genus: Hyalurga
- Species: H. rica

Binomial name
- Hyalurga rica (Hübner, [1831])

Synonyms
- Dioptis rica Hübner, [1831]; Laurona rica

Species of moth

Hyalurga rica is a moth of the family Erebidae. It was described by Jacob Hübner in 1831. It is found on Cuba.
