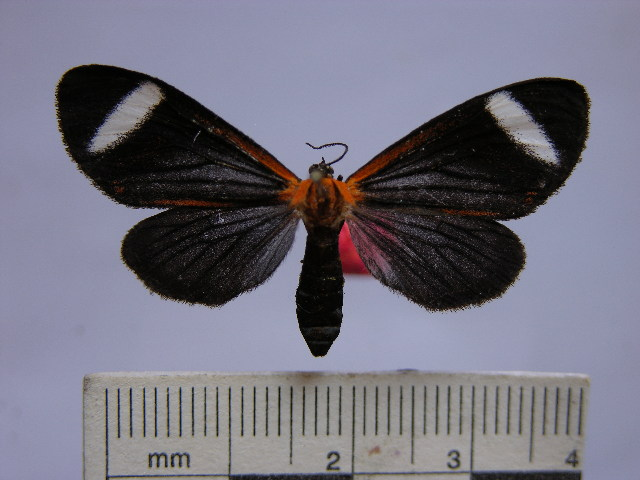

Scientific classification
- Domain: Eukaryota
- Kingdom: Animalia
- Phylum: Arthropoda
- Class: Insecta
- Order: Lepidoptera
- Superfamily: Noctuoidea
- Family: Erebidae
- Subfamily: Arctiinae
- Genus: Hyalurga
- Species: H. vinosa

Binomial name
- Hyalurga vinosa (Drury, [1773])

Synonyms
- Phalaena vinosa Drury, [1773]; Phalaena horologica Goeze, 1799; Lauron ergolis Walker, 1854; Lauron domingonis Butler, 1876; Hyalurga diastilba Hering, 1925

= Hyalurga vinosa =

Species of moth

Hyalurga vinosa is a moth of the family Erebidae first described by Dru Drury in 1773. It is found on Saint Kitts, Antigua, Jamaica and the Dominican Republic.

The larvae feed on Heliotropium indicum.
