= Hyalurga pura =

Scientific classification
- Domain: Eukaryota
- Kingdom: Animalia
- Phylum: Arthropoda
- Class: Insecta
- Order: Lepidoptera
- Superfamily: Noctuoidea
- Family: Erebidae
- Subfamily: Arctiinae
- Genus: Hyalurga
- Species: H. pura

Binomial name
- Hyalurga pura Butler, 1876

Species of moth

Hyalurga pura is a moth of the family Erebidae. It was described by Arthur Gardiner Butler in 1876. It is found in Brazil.
