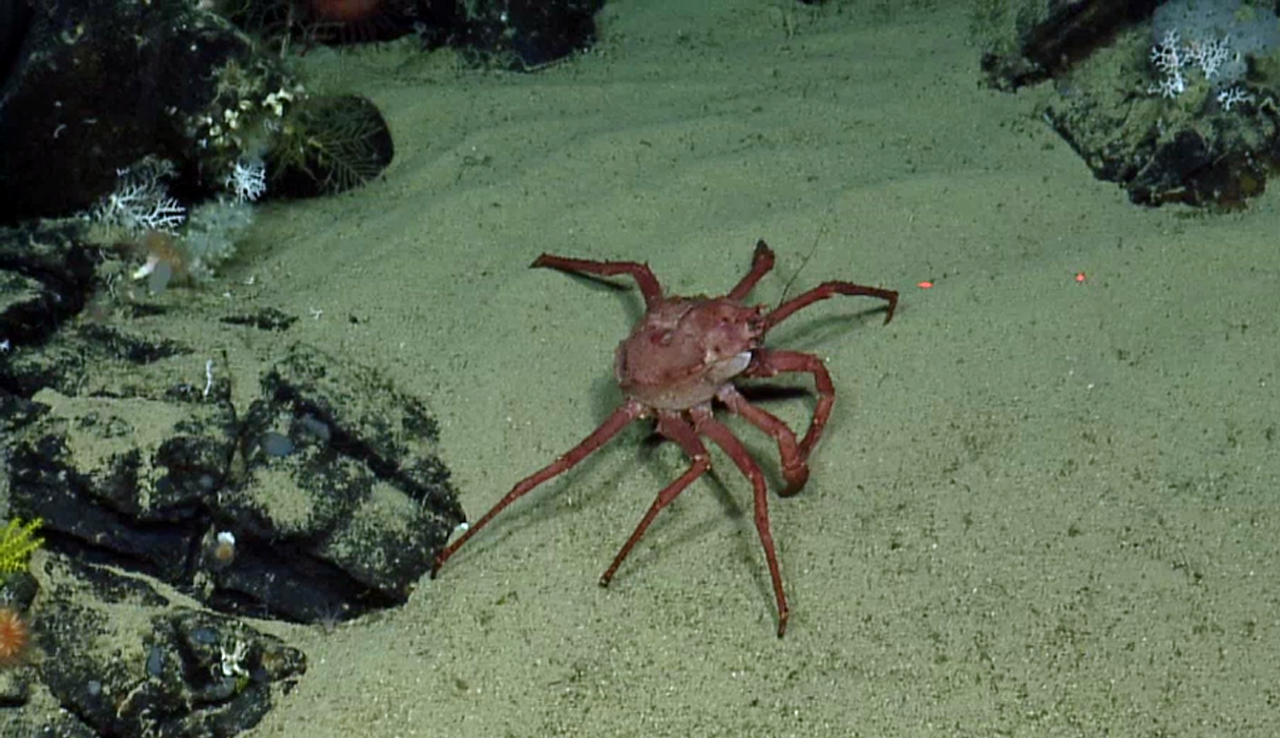

Scientific classification
- Kingdom: Animalia
- Phylum: Arthropoda
- Class: Malacostraca
- Order: Decapoda
- Suborder: Pleocyemata
- Infraorder: Anomura
- Family: Lithodidae
- Genus: Lithodes
- Species: L. panamensis

Binomial name
- Lithodes panamensis Faxon, 1893

= Lithodes panamensis =

Species of king crab

Lithodes panamensis is a species of king crab. It is distributed along the Pacific coast of South America from Panama to northern Chile.

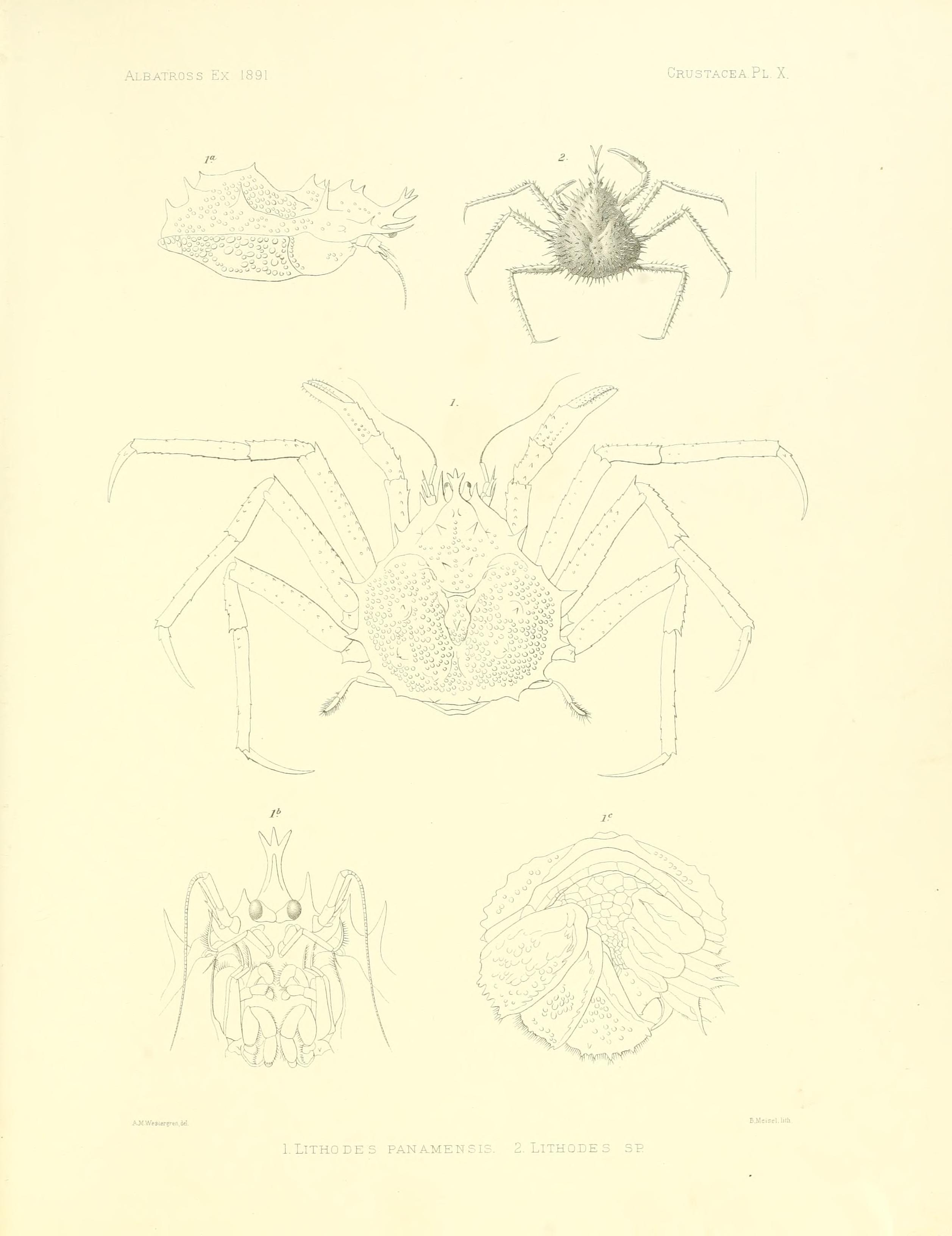
Fig. 1 L. panamensis.
