= Lithodes formosae =

Scientific classification
- Domain: Eukaryota
- Kingdom: Animalia
- Phylum: Arthropoda
- Class: Malacostraca
- Order: Decapoda
- Suborder: Pleocyemata
- Infraorder: Anomura
- Family: Lithodidae
- Genus: Lithodes
- Species: L. formosae

Binomial name
- Lithodes formosae Ahyong & Chan, 2010

Synonyms
- Paralomis formosa Henderson 1888

Species of king crab

Lithodes formosae is a species of king crab. It is presently known to be found in Taiwan from depths of 500–600 m (1,600–2,000 ft). It closely resembles Lithodes paulayi.
