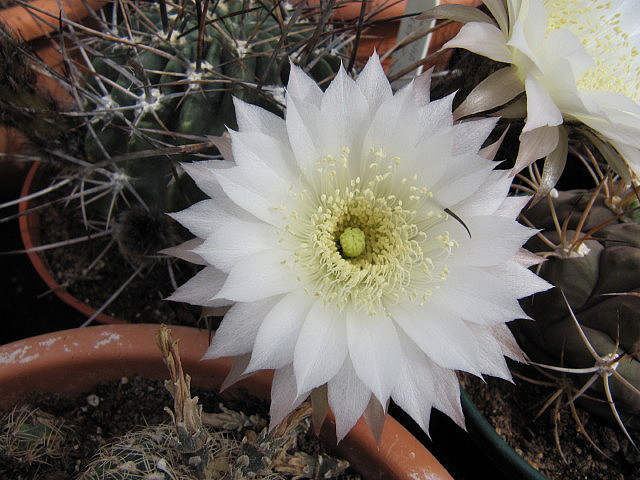

Conservation status
- Least Concern (IUCN 3.1)

Scientific classification
- Kingdom: Plantae
- Clade: Tracheophytes
- Clade: Angiosperms
- Clade: Eudicots
- Order: Caryophyllales
- Family: Cactaceae
- Subfamily: Cactoideae
- Genus: Echinopsis
- Species: E. ferox

Binomial name
- Echinopsis ferox (Britton & Rose) Backeb.

Synonyms
- Furiolobivia ferox (Britton & Rose) Y.Itô; Lobivia ferox Britton & Rose; Pseudolobivia ferox (Britton & Rose) Backeb.

= Echinopsis ferox =

Species of cactus

Echinopsis ferox, synonym Lobivia ferox, is a species of Echinopsis found in Bolivia, northwest Argentina, and north Chile.

== Description ==
Echinopsis ferox grows individually, spherical to briefly cylindrical and reaches a height of 20 to 30 (up to 50) cm and up to over 30 cm in diameter. The approximately 30 ribs run in a spiral shape and are covered with sharp-edged humps. The oval areoles are about 3 cm apart and have a light wool felt. The thorns can almost completely cover the body, are long, stiff, curved to straight, sometimes hooked, light brown to horn-colored, darker in new growth and later graying. There are 2 to 5, up to 18 cm long, upwardly curved central spines and 8 to 14 marginal spines that are 3 to 7 cm long and radiate out to the sides.

The funnel-shaped flowers reach a length of 9 to 11 (up to 13) centimeters and have a diameter of 6 to 8 (up to 10) centimeters. They appear laterally in the upper half of the shoot. The color of the petals varies between white, pink, purple, yellow and orange, the stamens are yellowish and protrude above the greenish hubs. The flower tube is greenish with pointed scales, the axils of which appear darker and are covered with gray wool. The spherical to barrel-shaped fruits are greenish and tearing. The black-brown seeds are 1.5 mm long and 0.7 mm thick.

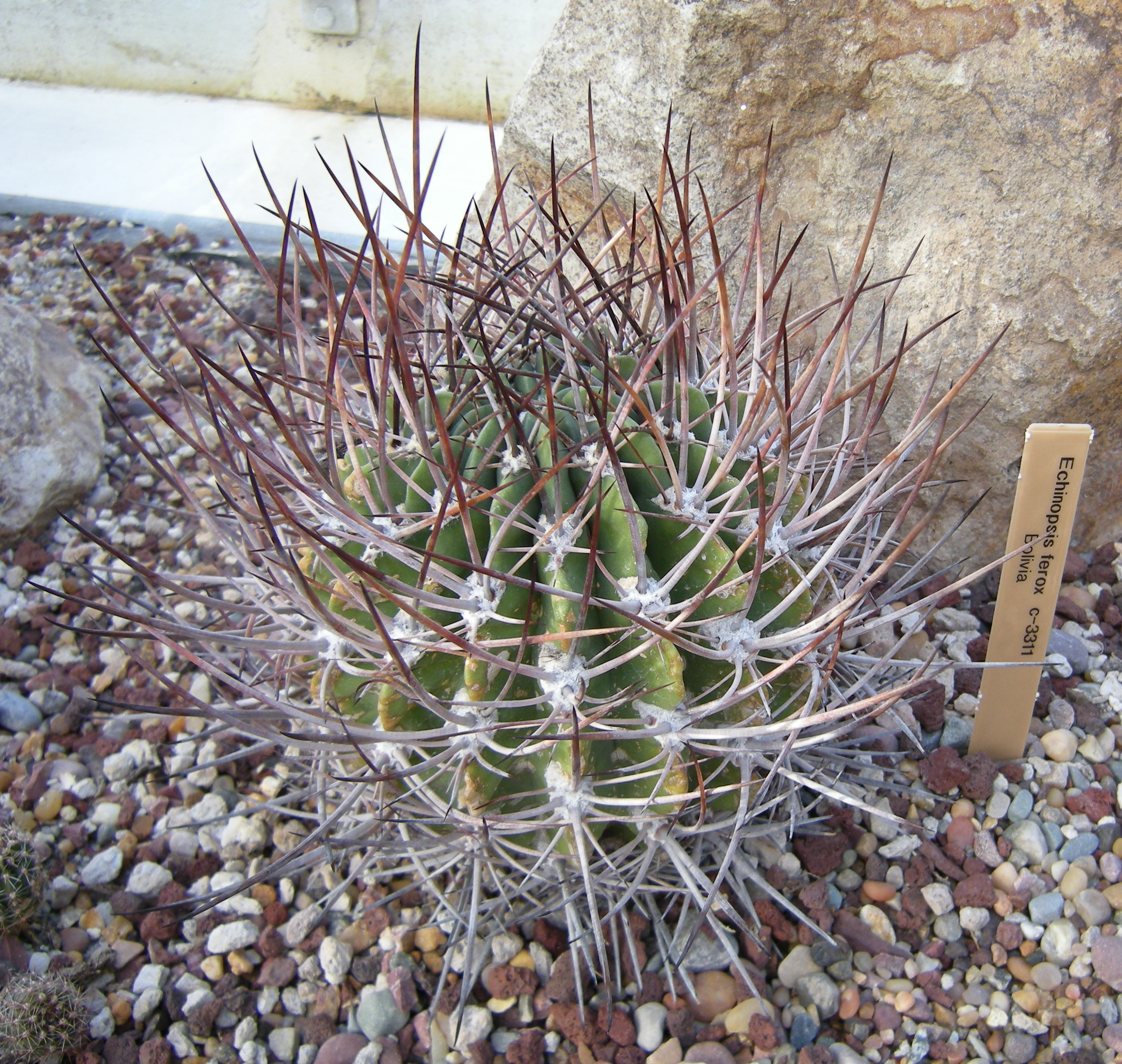

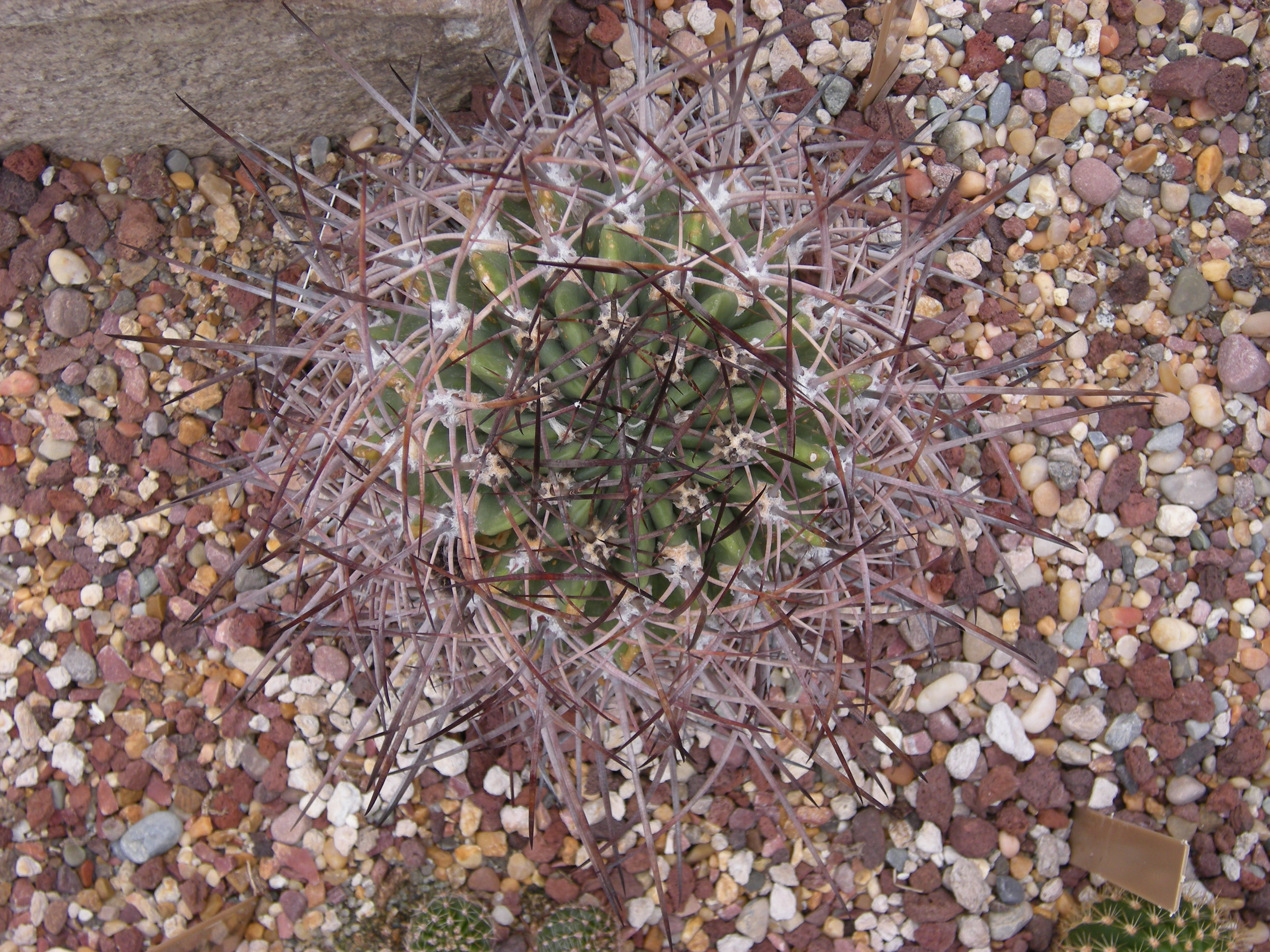

== Taxonomy ==
The species was first described by Nathaniel Lord Britton and Joseph Nelson Rose in 1922 as Lobivia ferox. The specific epithet ferox comes from Latin, means 'wild' and refers to the thorns of the species. In 1934, Curt Backeberg transferred the species to Echinopsis as Echinopsis ferox, the placement accepted by Plants of the World Online as of November 2025.

== Distribution ==
Echinopsis ferox is widespread in Bolivia in the departments of Oruro, Potosí, Chuquisaca and Tarija, in Argentina in the provinces of Jujuy and Salta and in Chile in the province of Iquique. It grows at altitudes from 2000 to 3500 m (in Chile up to 4000 m). The large distribution area results in a corresponding variety of forms.
