= Lithodes jessica =

Conservation status
- Data Deficient (NZ TCS)

Scientific classification
- Domain: Eukaryota
- Kingdom: Animalia
- Phylum: Arthropoda
- Class: Malacostraca
- Order: Decapoda
- Suborder: Pleocyemata
- Infraorder: Anomura
- Family: Lithodidae
- Genus: Lithodes
- Species: L. jessica

Binomial name
- Lithodes jessica Ahyong, 2010

Species of king crab

Lithodes jessica is a species of king crab in the genus Lithodes. It is found off the coast of New Zealand on the Lord Howe Rise at depths from 680–1,100 m (2,230–3,610 ft).

== Description ==
L. jessica has a pyriform carapace with long, slender spines, and its chelipeds are long and cylindrical. Its colour in life is unknown. Having been measured with at most a carapace length of 110.5 mm (4.35 in) and a carapace width of 58.1 mm (2.29 in), it is small enough to resemble early adults of other species within Lithodes.
