= Lithodes rachelae =

Scientific classification
- Kingdom: Animalia
- Phylum: Arthropoda
- Class: Malacostraca
- Order: Decapoda
- Suborder: Pleocyemata
- Infraorder: Anomura
- Family: Lithodidae
- Genus: Lithodes
- Species: L. rachelae

Binomial name
- Lithodes rachelae Ahyong, 2010

Species of king crab

Holotype site: Great Australian Bight'"`UNIQ--ref-00000006-QINU`"'

Lithodes rachelae is a species of king crab. It is distributed along the southern coast of Australia at depths of 930–1,500 m (3,050–4,920 ft), from the far southwest to the Great Australian Bight.
