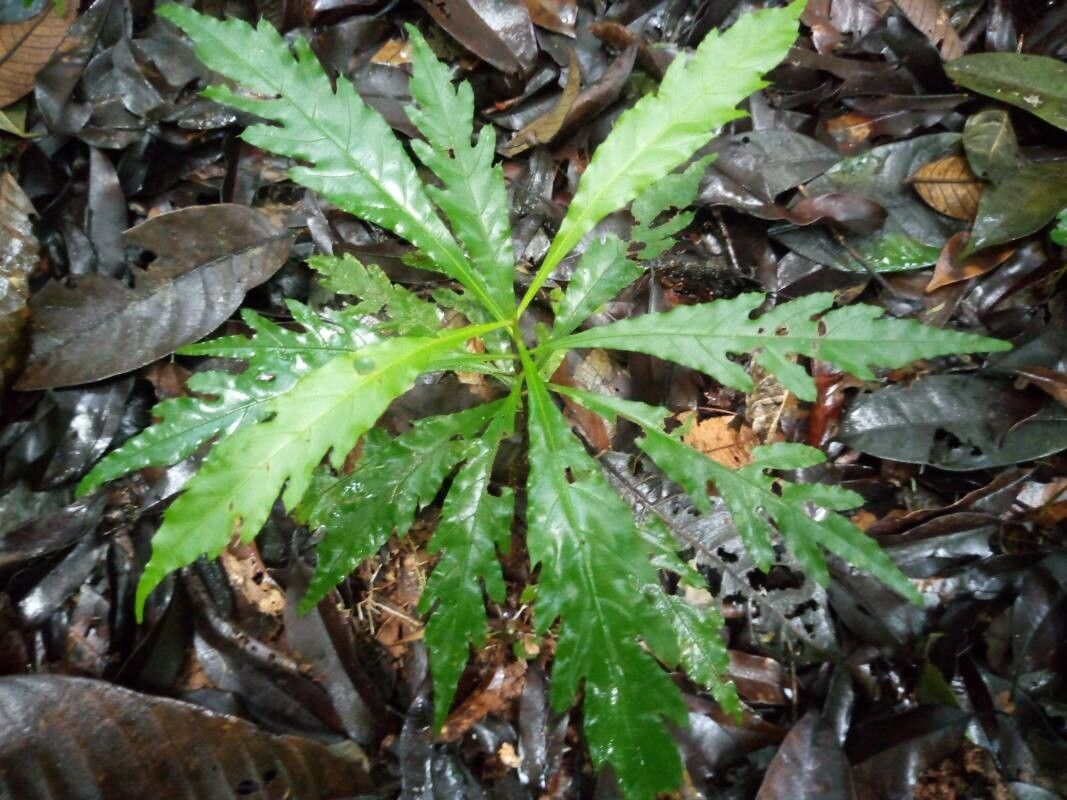

Scientific classification
- Kingdom: Plantae
- Clade: Tracheophytes
- Clade: Angiosperms
- Clade: Eudicots
- Clade: Rosids
- Order: Malpighiales
- Family: Ochnaceae
- Genus: Lacunaria
- Species: L. crenata

Binomial name
- Lacunaria crenata (Tul.) A.C.Sm.

Synonyms
- Quiina crenata Tul.

= Lacunaria crenata =

Species of plant

Lacunaria crenata is a species of flowering plant in the family Ochnaceae, native from Central America to Brazil. It was first described by Edmond Tulasne in 1849 as Quiina crenata.

== Distribution ==
Lacunaria crenata is native to Central America (Costa Rica, Honduras and Nicaragua and Panama) and northern South America (Brazil, Colombia, Ecuador, French Guiana, Guyana, Peru, Suriname and Venezuela).

== Subspecies ==
As of 2023, Plants of the World Online accepted two subspecies:

- Lacunaria crenata subsp. crenata
- Lacunaria crenata subsp. decastyla (Radlk.) J.V.Schneid. & Zizka

== Conservation ==
Lacunaria panamensis was assessed as "endangered" in the 1998 IUCN Red List, where it is said to be native only to Costa Rica, Honduras, and Panama. As of February 2023, L. panamensis was regarded as a synonym of L. crenata subsp. crenata, which has a much wider distribution, being found throughout the range of L. crenata.
