= Hyalurga sora =

Scientific classification
- Kingdom: Animalia
- Phylum: Arthropoda
- Clade: Pancrustacea
- Class: Insecta
- Order: Lepidoptera
- Superfamily: Noctuoidea
- Family: Erebidae
- Subfamily: Arctiinae
- Genus: Hyalurga
- Species: H. sora

Binomial name
- Hyalurga sora (Boisduval, 1870)

Synonyms
- Ditaxis sora Boisduval, 1870; Laurona panamensis Butler, 1876; Hyalurga soroides Hering, 1925

Species of moth

Hyalurga sora is a moth of the family Erebidae. It was described by Jean Baptiste Boisduval in 1870. It is found in Mexico, Guatemala and Panama.
