= Lithodes megacantha =

Scientific classification
- Kingdom: Animalia
- Phylum: Arthropoda
- Class: Malacostraca
- Order: Decapoda
- Suborder: Pleocyemata
- Infraorder: Anomura
- Family: Lithodidae
- Genus: Lithodes
- Species: L. megacantha

Binomial name
- Lithodes megacantha Macpherson, 1991

Species of king crab

Lithodes megacantha is a species of king crab in the genus Lithodes. They are bright red and have been found in French Polynesia at depths of around 1,000 m (3,300 ft).

It closely resembles Lithodes longispina.

== Taxonomy ==
The name "megacantha" means "large spine" from the Greek words "mega" and "acantha".
