= Lithodes australiensis =

Scientific classification
- Domain: Eukaryota
- Kingdom: Animalia
- Phylum: Arthropoda
- Class: Malacostraca
- Order: Decapoda
- Suborder: Pleocyemata
- Infraorder: Anomura
- Family: Lithodidae
- Genus: Lithodes
- Species: L. australiensis

Binomial name
- Lithodes australiensis Ahyong, 2010

Species of king crab

Holotype site'"`UNIQ--ref-00000006-QINU`"'

Lithodes australiensis is a species of king crab. They live in southeastern Australia, known as far north as Cape Hawke and as far south as the South Tasman Rise. They have been found at depths between 540–1,312 m (1,772–4,304 ft), but they typically live between 1,000–1,100 m (3,300–3,600 ft).

== Description ==
Lithodes australiensis is deep-red in colour. It has a pyriform carapace featuring prominent, slender spines sparsely interspersed with granules on its dorsal surface. The carapace has been measured as large as 199.7 mm (7.86 in) (Note: Postorbital carapace length 132.8 mm (5.23 in)) in length and 127.5 mm (5.02 in) in width in males. (Note: No current records exist of adult females.) It has a prominent rostrum, comprising about half of the carapace length in juveniles and about one-third in adults. Its chelipeds and walking legs have major spines separated by a smooth or mostly smooth surface, and the chelipeds are around half the length of the walking legs. The chelae bear small spines and tubercles, and the fingers have tufts of golden setae arranged in rows. Its frontmost pair of walking legs tend to be smaller than the other two, and all of its dactyli are curved. On its underside, the third through fifth segments of its abdomen have a median plate featuring nodules. Toward the posterior, its abdomen has a wrinkly second segment, and toward the front, it has a rounded telson.
