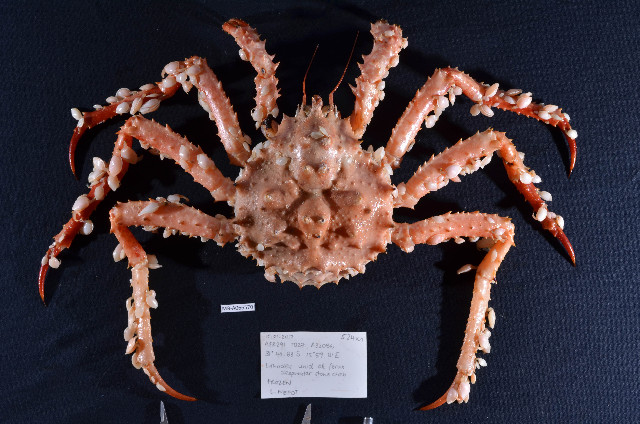

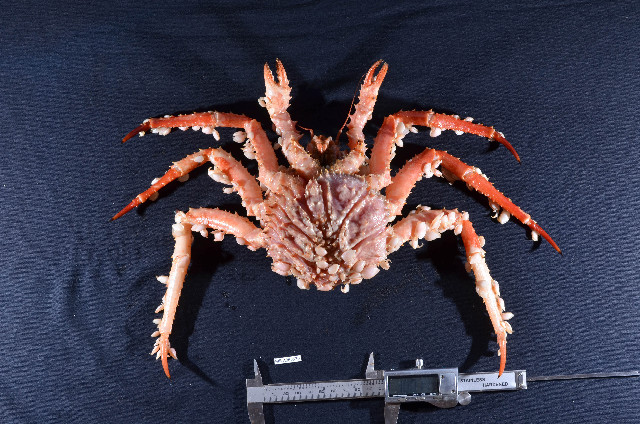

Scientific classification
- Kingdom: Animalia
- Phylum: Arthropoda
- Clade: Pancrustacea
- Class: Malacostraca
- Order: Decapoda
- Suborder: Pleocyemata
- Infraorder: Anomura
- Family: Lithodidae
- Genus: Lithodes
- Species: L. ferox

Binomial name
- Lithodes ferox Filhol, 1885

Synonyms
- Lithodes tropicalis A. Milne-Edwards, 1883; Pseudolithodes pyriforms Birstein & Vinogradov, 1972

= Lithodes ferox =

Species of king crab

Lithodes ferox, also known as the fierce king crab, is a species of king crab. It has been found on the muddy bottoms of the southeastern Atlantic Ocean at depths from 160–1,013 m (525–3,323 ft). It is distributed between the Gulf of Guinea, the northwesternmost coast of South Africa, and the island of Saint Helena.
