= Lithodes wiracocha =

Scientific classification
- Kingdom: Animalia
- Phylum: Arthropoda
- Clade: Pancrustacea
- Class: Malacostraca
- Order: Decapoda
- Suborder: Pleocyemata
- Infraorder: Anomura
- Family: Lithodidae
- Genus: Lithodes
- Species: L. wiracocha

Binomial name
- Lithodes wiracocha Haig, 1974

Species of king crab

Lithodes wiracocha is a species of king crab. It has been found off the northwestern coast of Peru at depths of 680–800 m (2,230–2,620 ft).
