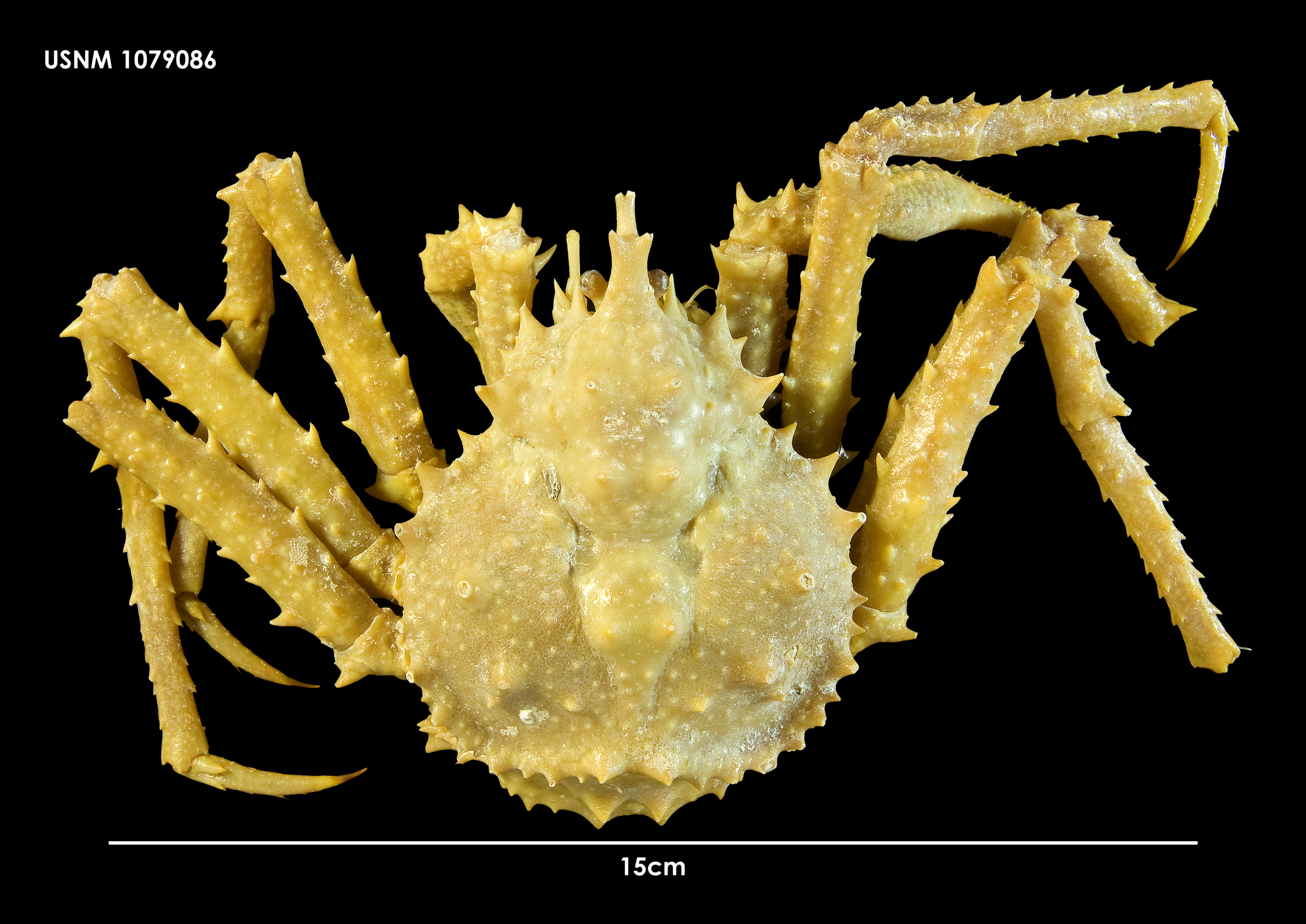
- Dorsal view of Lithodes murrayi

Scientific classification
- Kingdom: Animalia
- Phylum: Arthropoda
- Class: Malacostraca
- Order: Decapoda
- Suborder: Pleocyemata
- Infraorder: Anomura
- Family: Lithodidae
- Genus: Lithodes
- Species: L. murrayi

Binomial name
- Lithodes murrayi Henderson, 1888

= Lithodes murrayi =

Species of king crab

Lithodes murrayi, also known as the subantarctic stone crab, is a species of king crab. It lives near islands in the southwestern Indian Ocean on muddy bottoms at depths of 35–1,015 m (115–3,330 ft).
