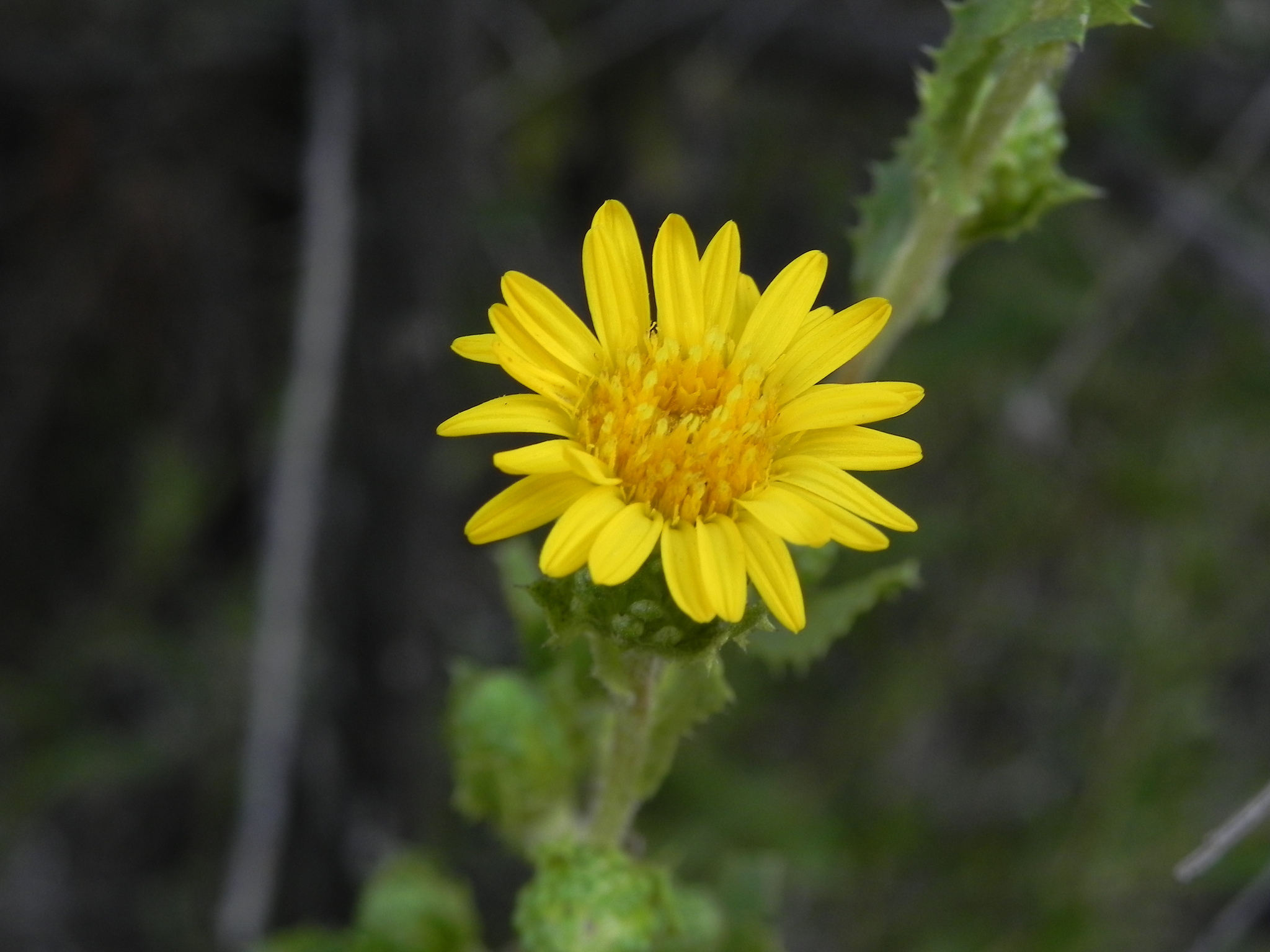
- In flower, San Diego, California

Scientific classification
- Kingdom: Plantae
- Clade: Tracheophytes
- Clade: Angiosperms
- Clade: Eudicots
- Clade: Asterids
- Order: Asterales
- Family: Asteraceae
- Genus: Hazardia
- Species: H. berberidis

Binomial name
- Hazardia berberidis (A.Gray) Greene 1894

Synonyms
- Haplopappus berberidis A.Gray 1884; Aplopappus berberidis A.Gray 1884; Aster berberidis (A.Gray) Kuntze

= Hazardia berberidis =

Species of flowering plant

Hazardia berberidis is a species of flowering plant in the family Asteraceae commonly known as the barberry-leaf goldenbush. A woody shrub, it is characterized by sawtooth leaves and yellow ray flowers that bloom from March to August. It is endemic to the coastal sage scrub and coastal succulent scrub habitats of Baja California, Mexico, but with populations of uncertain origin in San Diego County, California.

== Description ==
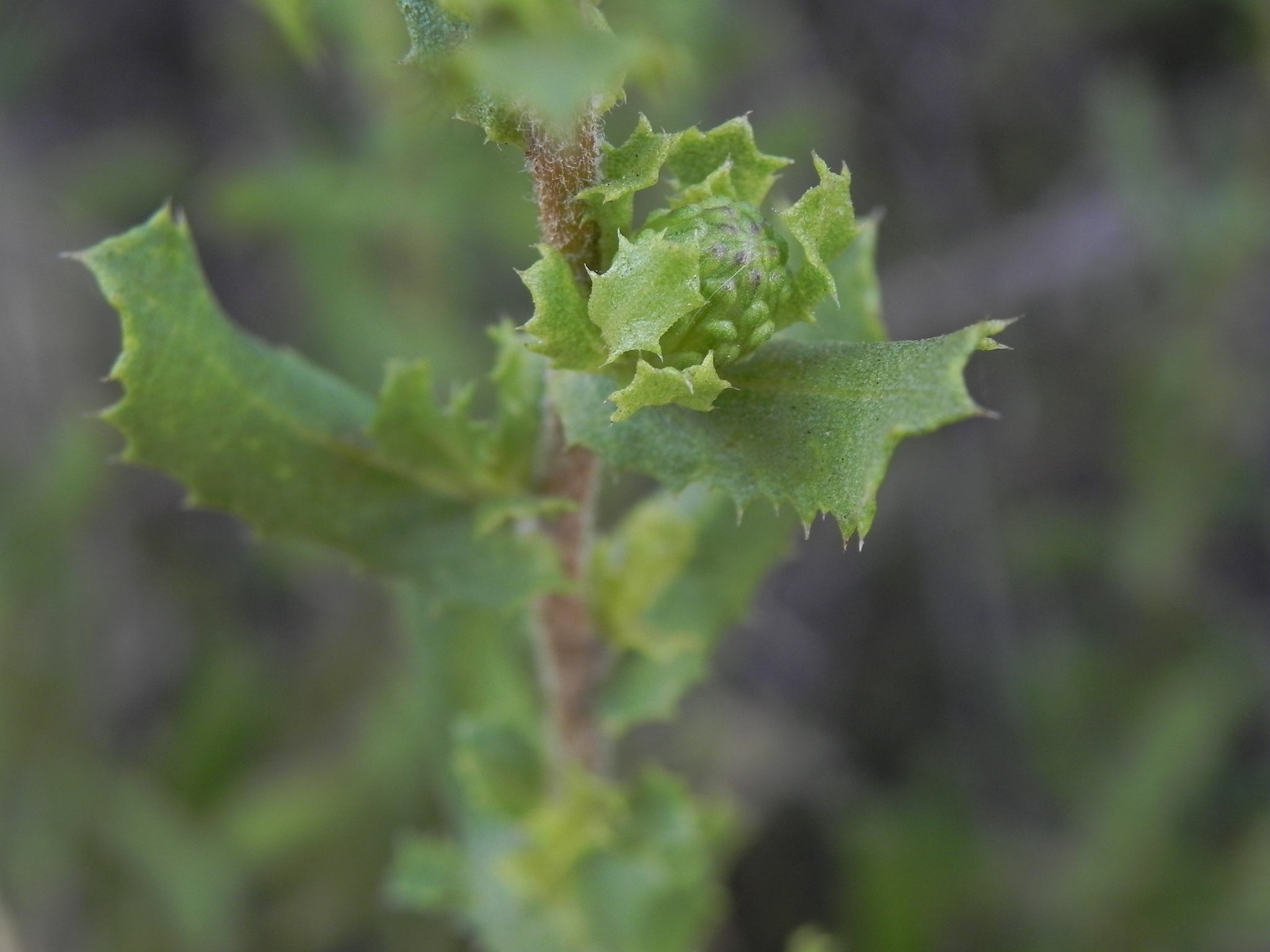
Leaves and a budding composite flower.

This species is a loosely-branched woody shrub that grows 0.5–2 m (1.6–6.6 ft) tall. The leaves have sawtooth-like edges, and are rigid and leathery, growing 1.5–5 cm (0.59–1.97 in) long. It is similar to Hazardia rosarica and Hazardia squarrosa, a shrubby congener with toothed leaves, with Hazardia berberidis being distinguished by its ray flowers and erect, non-squarrose involucral bracts.

=== Morphology ===
The branches of this species are 3–30 mm (0.12–1.18 in) in diameter and reach 5–10 dm (20–39 in) in length, and are covered with sparse, villous hairs (trichomes). The branches are leafy throughout, with the internodes measuring around 1–2.5 cm (0.39–0.98 in), usually with small fascicles in the axils. The leaves are sessile, and are shaped ovate-oblong to oblong, 1.5–5 cm (0.59–1.97 in) long and 3–18 mm (0.12–0.71 in) wide. Most of the leaf is usually free of hair. On the lower surface of the leaf is a prominent midrib, towards the base of which the only hairs on the leaf may be found. The margins of the leaf are distinctly dentate, with acute and spiny serrations throughout.

The composite flowers have a radiate head, with disk flowers in the center surrounded by ray flowers, colored yellow and aging to a dark red to purple. The composite flowers are borne either solitary at the ends of branches, sessile in a racemose capitulescence, or on leafy peduncles that grow up to 3 cm (1.2 in) long. The involucres are shaped like a broad, inverted cone or bell, and are shorter than the disk. The involucres measure 1–2 cm (0.39–0.79 in) high by 1–1.5 cm (0.39–0.59 in) wide, and have 30 to 60 erect bracts.

There are 15 to 25 ray florets surrounding the center of disk florets. The ray florets have ligules that measure 6–9 mm (0.24–0.35 in) long by 1.5–2 mm (0.059–0.079 in) wide, and are faintly 3-lobed at their tip. There are 30 to 60 disk florets in the center of the composite flower. In fruit, achenes about 4–5 mm (0.16–0.20 in) long form in both types of florets, with a pappus of 30 to 50 brown-colored bristles.

== Taxonomy ==
The type specimen of this species was collected in July 1882 at Bahía de Todos Santos, by a Miss F.E. Fish. It was later described in 1884 by Asa Gray, and combined into Hazardia berberidis by Edward Lee Greene in 1894. It is not presently Haplopappus as taxonomic research led to the split of that genus into many different segregates, including Hazardia, all known commonly as goldenbushes. There are 10 shrub species of Hazardia native to the Baja California region, including 8 endemics.

This species forms natural hybrids with Hazardia orcuttii and Hazardia ferrisiae. In 1928 H.M. Hall noted the similarity of H. berberidis to Haplopappus species in the section Polyphylla from South America, particularly Haplopappus deserticolus and Haplopappus mucronatus. Hall suggested that they may be close relatives, and the same chromosome number, n = 5, is found both in several South American species and in H. berberidis. In addition, hybrids between Hazardia and Haplopappus section Polyphylla have been made. However, studies of chemicals from both groups suggest they are generically distinct.

== Distribution and habitat ==
This species is endemic to Baja California, Mexico. It is found on the Islas Coronados, Islas Todos Santos and the adjacent coast south to El Rosario. It is primarily abundant in coastal areas, like beaches, bluffs and edges of sand dunes, and inland to hillsides and arroyos. It usually grows in the Mediterranean-type climate of coastal sage scrub and coastal succulent scrub, being associated with Agave, Artemisia, Simmondsia, Opuntia, Rhus, and Atriplex species.

Hazardia berberidis is present in San Diego County, California, but it is unknown whether the plants there represent native or introduced populations.
