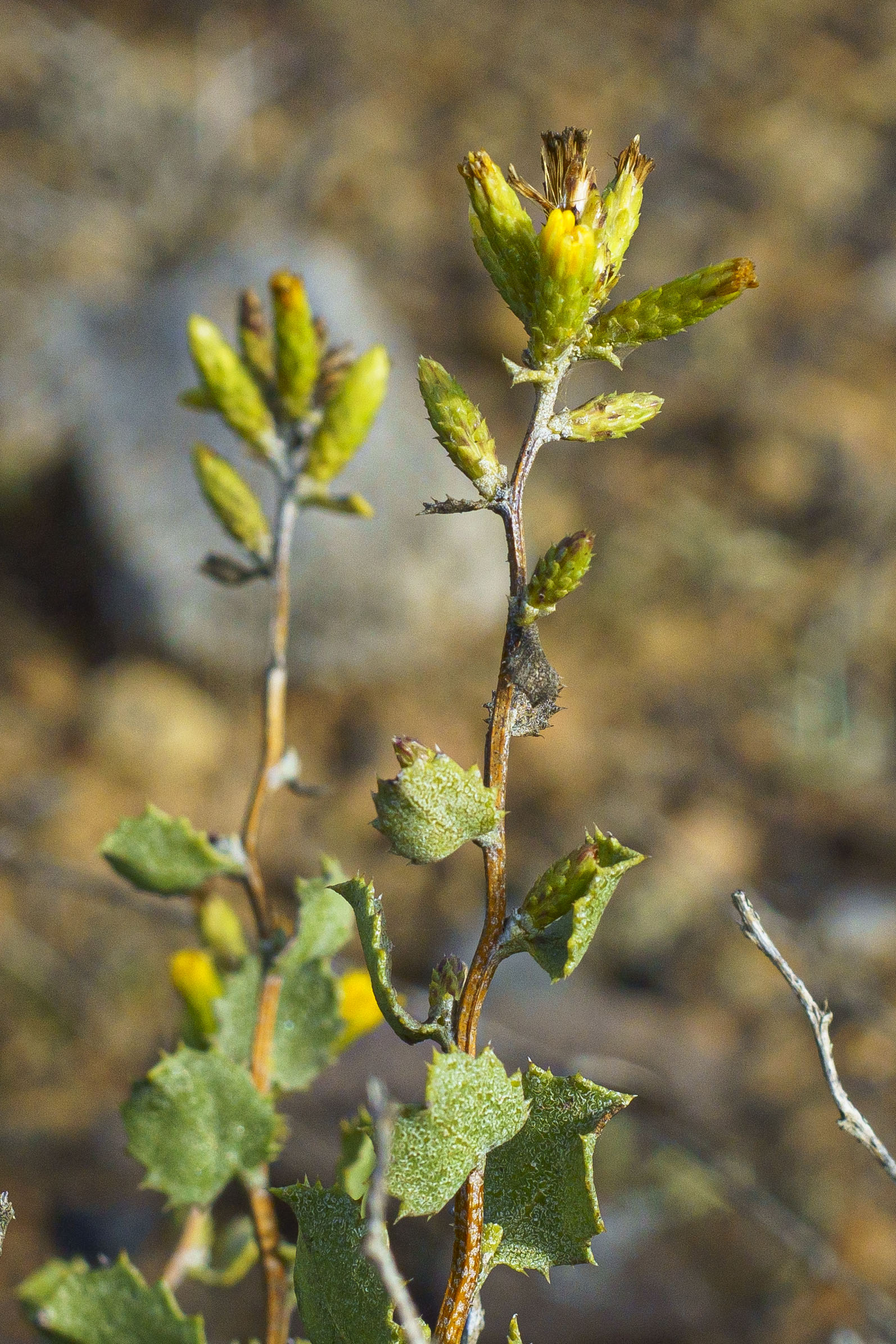
- The flower heads, leaves, and branchlets of Hazardia rosarica

Scientific classification
- Kingdom: Plantae
- Clade: Tracheophytes
- Clade: Angiosperms
- Clade: Eudicots
- Clade: Asterids
- Order: Asterales
- Family: Asteraceae
- Genus: Hazardia
- Species: H. rosarica

Binomial name
- Hazardia rosarica (Moran) W.D.Clark 1979

Synonyms
- Haplopappus rosaricus Moran 1969

= Hazardia rosarica =

Species of flowering plant

Hazardia rosarica is a species of flowering shrub in the family Asteraceae commonly known as the El Rosario goldenbush. Hazardia rosarica is a fragrant shrub characterized by its zigzagged branches, toothed glutinous leaves, and yellow flower heads of only disc flowers. This species is endemic to Mexico and is only found in the region near of the town of El Rosario in Baja California. It is usually found on north and east facing slopes and ridgetops close to the coast.

== Description ==
Hazardia rosarica is a shrub characterized by its lemony fragrance, glabrous zigzagged branches, toothed glutinous leaves, and yellow flower heads that only contain disc flowers. It is most similar to the polytypic Hazardia squarrosa, whose southern subspecies grindelioides approaches the range of H. rosarica, and both species share a lack of ray flowers. However, H. squarrosa is a much taller, larger shrub with a characteristic pubescence on its stems and a different fragrance, as opposed to H. rosarica with its smaller stature, completely hairless stems and sweet, lemony fragrance.

=== Morphology ===
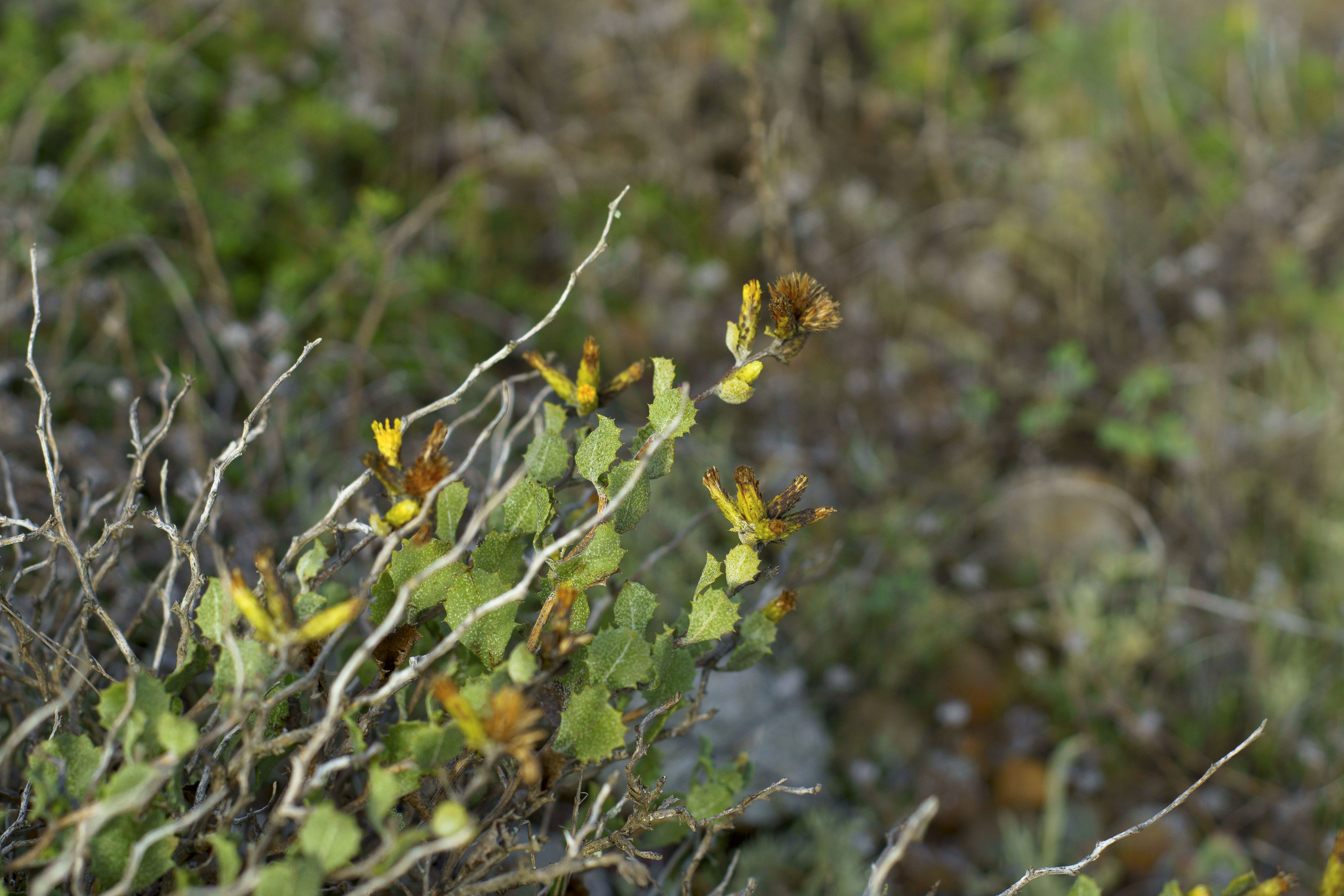
Hazardia rosarica on a mesa near El Rosario, Baja California.

Hazardia rosarica is a glutinous, fragrant shrub 2–9 dm (7.9–35.4 in) tall, with many erect to ascending branches emerging from a woody base. The branchlets are zigzag, and in youth are very tan and measure 1 mm (0.039 in) in diameter but become gray and measure up to 3 mm (0.12 in) thick in age. The internodes average around 5–15 mm (0.20–0.59 in), and the branchlets are glabrous and have glutinous to granular surfaces.

The leaves range from sessile to subpetiolate, rarely with auriculate-clasping or subclasping bases, and are shaped obovate to spatulate with obtuse to rounded-acute tips. The leaves measure 10–25 mm (0.39–0.98 in) long by 5–12 mm (0.20–0.47 in) and 1–2 mm (0.039–0.079 in) wide at the base. The leaf margins are mostly dentate, and have 2 to 8 teeth per margin, with a small white spine on the tip of each tooth, although sometimes the leaf margins may be entire on their lower half. The leaves have a coriaceous texture, and are conspicuously glandular-pitted or somewhat rugose in youth, and are typically green with a whitish exudate. The plant produces numerous flower heads each head with 12-30 yellow disc flowers but no ray flowers.

=== Cytology ===
The gametic chromosome number of Hazardia rosarica is n = 5.

== Taxonomy ==
This species was first described in 1969 in the Transactions of the San Diego Society of Natural History by Reid Moran as Haplopappus rosaricus. The type specimen was collected in July of 1967 from a north-facing slope at the Arroyo del Campo Viejo, about 7.2 miles north-northwest of El Rosario in northwestern Baja California.

In a 1979 issue of Madroño, W. Dennis Clark elevated Hazardia from a section within the genus Haplopappus to a generic rank, thus creating the new combination Hazardia rosarica. He also divided the genus into three sections; Machaerantheroides, Bracteofolia, and Hazardia, with H. rosarica placed in sect. Hazardia.

== Distribution and habitat ==
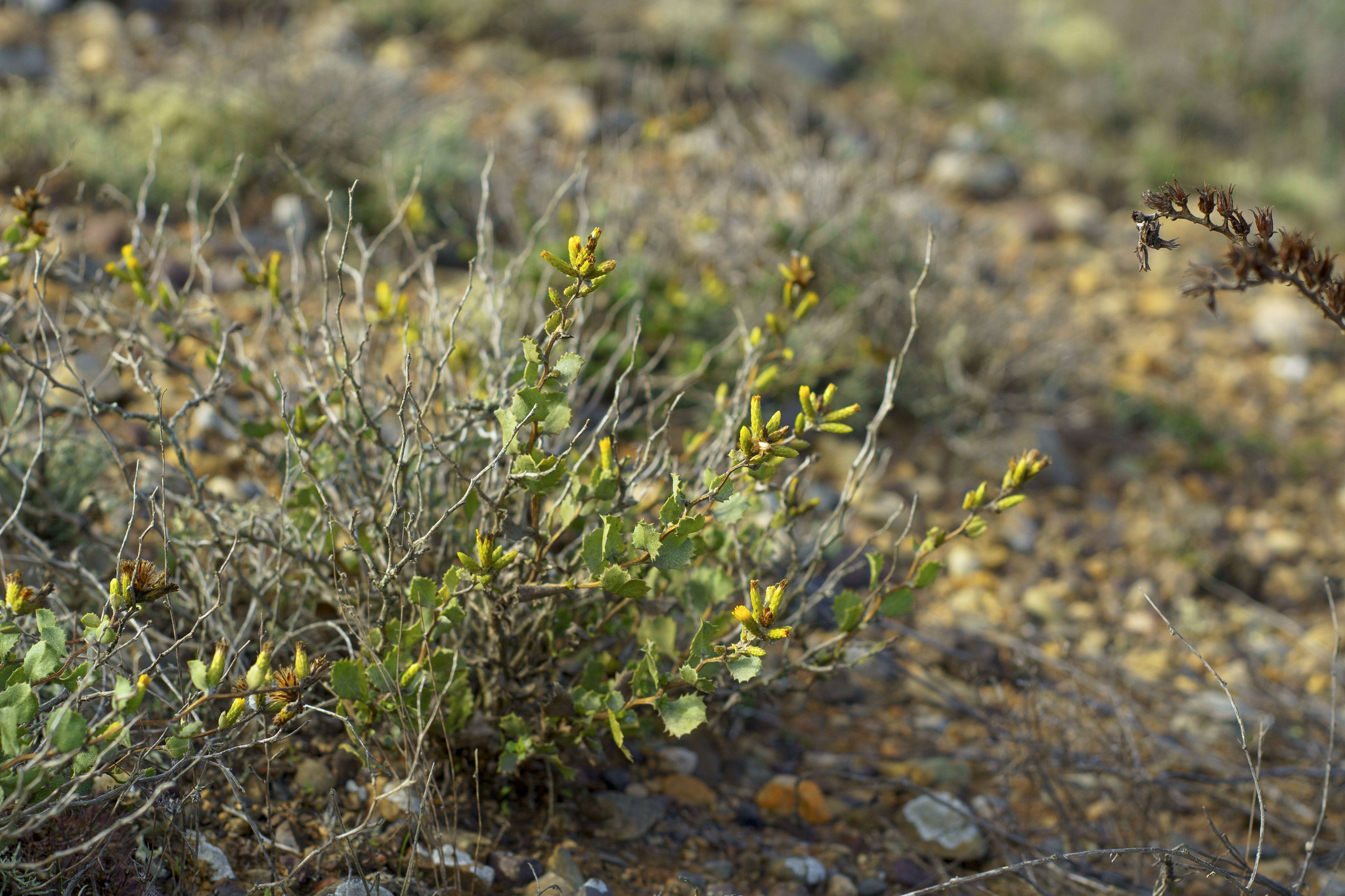
Hazardia rosarica in habitat.

Hazardia rosarica is endemic to Mexico, and is only found in the state of Baja California. It occurs along the coastal foothills from northeast of El Socorro to the southeast of the town of El Rosario, usually within 8 km (5.0 mi) to 12 mi (19 km) of the coast.

Hazardia rosarica is typically found at 75 m (246 ft) to 475 m (1,558 ft) in elevation on north and east facing slopes and ridgetops, and it usually grows in association with Agave shawii, Rosa minutifolia, Euphorbia misera, and Ambrosia chenopodiifolia. Other associates include Aesculus, Dudleya, and Bergerocactus, and Hazardia vernicosa. Although endemic to a small area, it is typically locally abundant where it is found.

== Uses ==
In the protologue, Moran reported that most natives of El Rosario did not have a name for the plant, but that one man said the plant was used in a remedy for toothache.
