= Furry crab =

Furry crab is an imprecise term which could refer to any of the following taxa:

- Chinese mitten crab, also known as the Shanghai hairy crab
- Kiwa (crustacean), a genus of deep-sea squat lobsters
- Hapalogaster cavicauda
