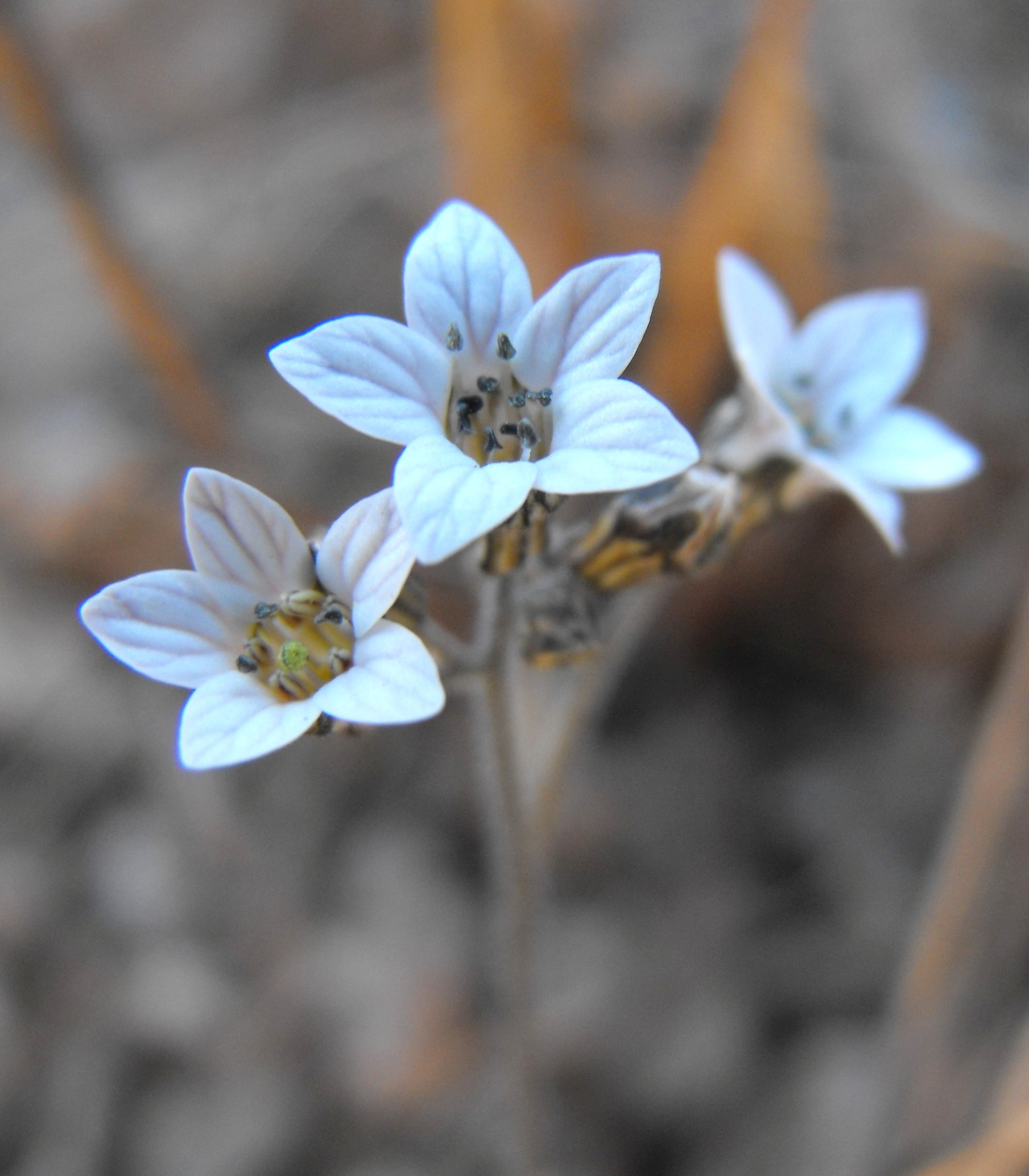

Conservation status
- Secure (NatureServe)

Scientific classification
- Kingdom: Plantae
- Clade: Tracheophytes
- Clade: Angiosperms
- Clade: Eudicots
- Order: Saxifragales
- Family: Saxifragaceae
- Genus: Jepsonia
- Species: J. parryi

Binomial name
- Jepsonia parryi (Torr.) Small

Synonyms
- Saxifraga parryi Torr.

= Jepsonia parryi =

Species of flowering plant

Jepsonia parryi is an uncommon species of flowering plant in the saxifrage family known by the common names coast jepsonia and Parry's jepsonia. It is a small geophytic plant that flowers briefly during fall, and often only has a single leaf that may appear above the ground after or during flowering. It is native to the coast and inland hills chaparral of southern California and Baja California.

== Description ==
This plant is a small perennial herb emerging from an enlarged underground stem, referred to as a caudex. The caudex is unbranched, shaped ovoid or rarely spherical. Typically, only one leaf is produced per plant on average, but if this leaf is injured another one may develop to replace it. The leaf is round or kidney-shaped and has a ruffled, lobed edge. Flowering is from October to February, producing a naked brown peduncle that is generally 3 to 28 cm tall, which holds a small inflorescence of fewer than four flowers. The tiny flower has tan to purplish-veined petals.

The leaves typically emerge after flowering has completed, although some emerge before this. In very dry years, no leaves may be produced at all. This species produces the fewest inflorescences per plant and the fewest flowers per inflorescence in the genus. It also has the shortest flowering period in the genus. This species is heterostylous, meaning that the flowers have styles of differing lengths. The heterostylous condition of the species makes pollination difficult. The pollinators for this plant are hover flies and halictid bees.

== Taxonomy ==
This plant was first collected between San Diego and San Luis Rey in 1850 by Charles C. Parry. This species was described as Saxifraga parryi by John Torrey in 1859. Torrey called this plant a "remarkable species," comparing it to a Heuchera. Torrey's description is comprehensive, but contains a number of errors, such as suggesting that the leaves wither after the flowers appear, and that singular plants may possess both long and short-styled flowers. In 1896, John K. Small later transferred Saxifraga parry to the current combination Jepsonia parryi, based on the distinctive habit and floral characteristics that separate them from Saxifraga. Small named the genus Jepsonia after Willis Linn Jepson.

== Distribution and habitat ==
This species is distributed in both the United States and Mexico, where it is found in the states of California and Baja California. In California, this species is found in the far southern coast and the Peninsular Ranges, distributed in Orange, Riverside and San Diego counties. In Baja California, this plant is uncommonly found from the vicinity of Tijuana south to El Rosario, also being found on the adjacent Coronado Islands.

This plant usually inhabits shrubby, rocky to brushy clay slopes, often north-facing, and usually below 1100–1200 m. It is also occasionally found in rich flatlands or shaded rock crevices. The habitat's climate is usually strongly influenced by the Pacific Ocean.

== Gallery ==
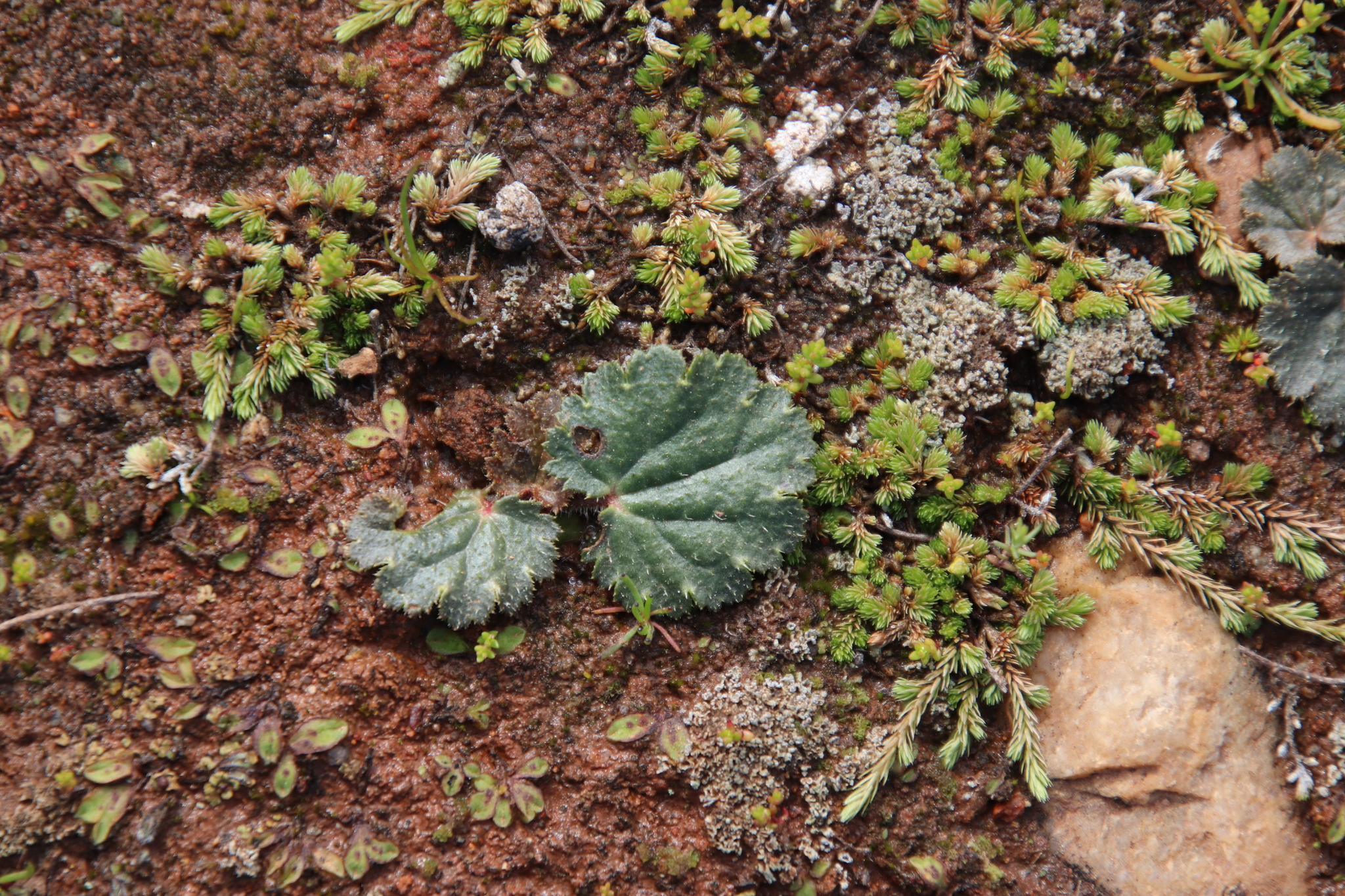
The leaves growing with Selaginella

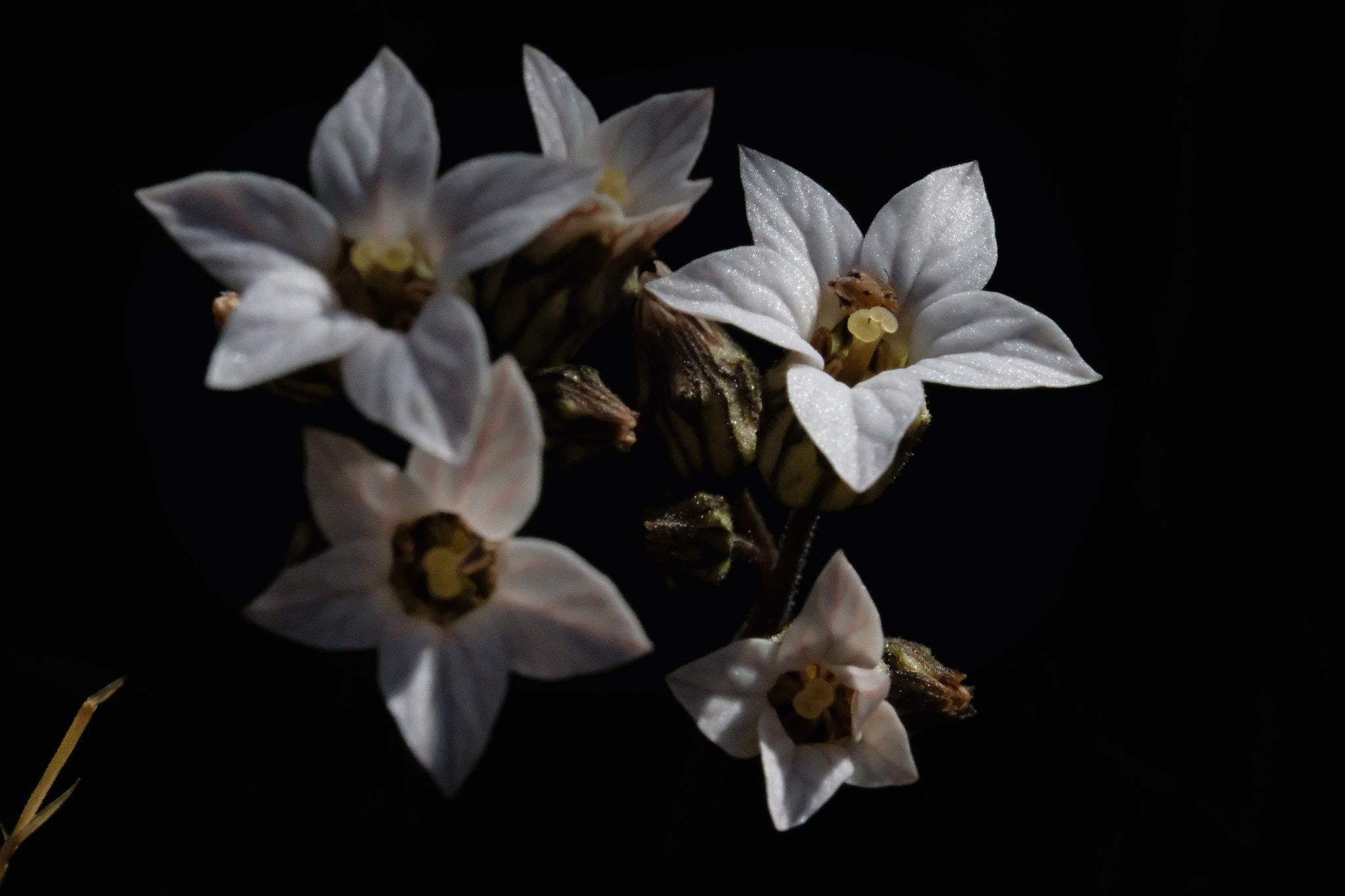
A frontal view of the flowers

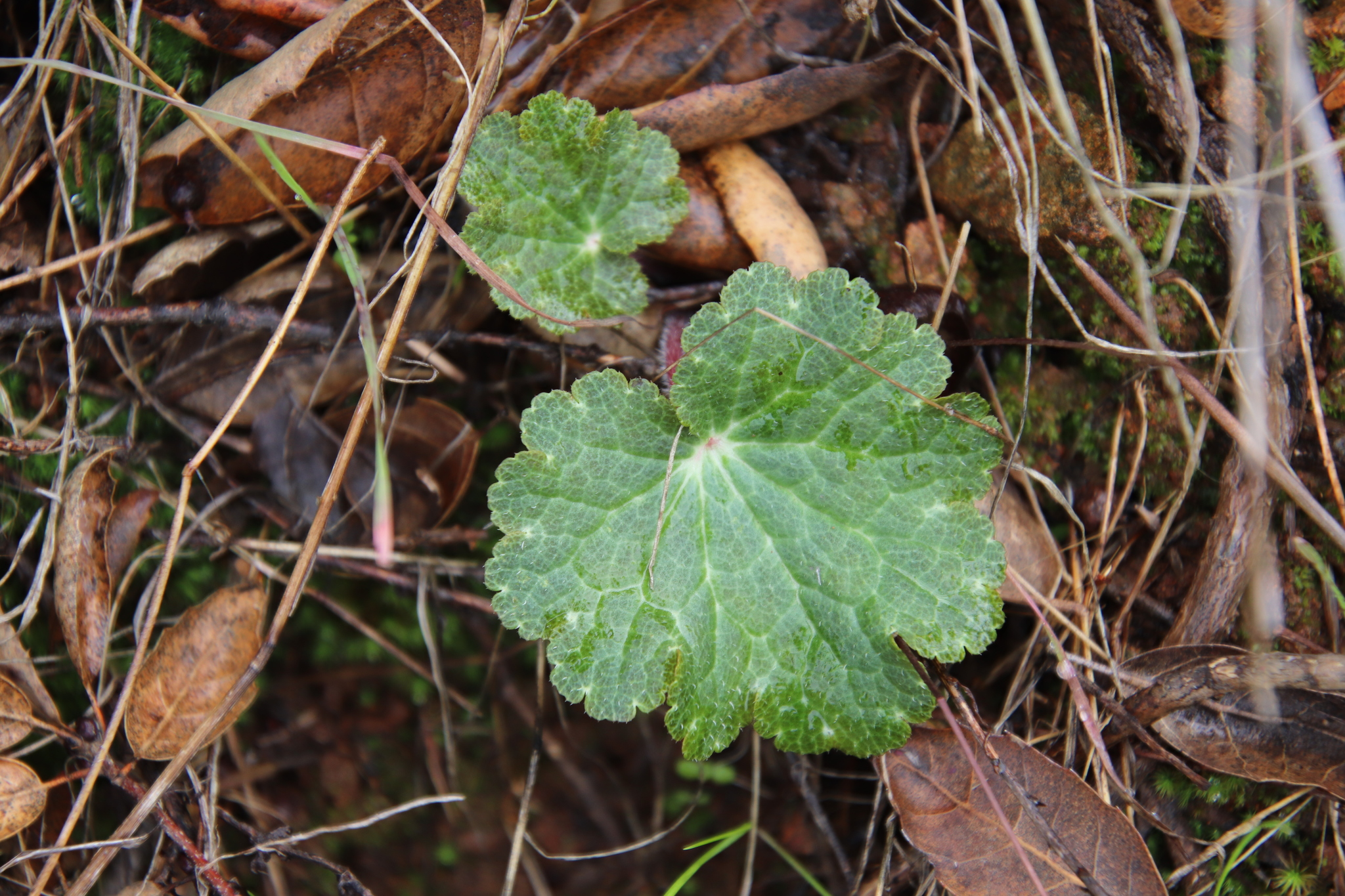
Two leaves emerged from the ground

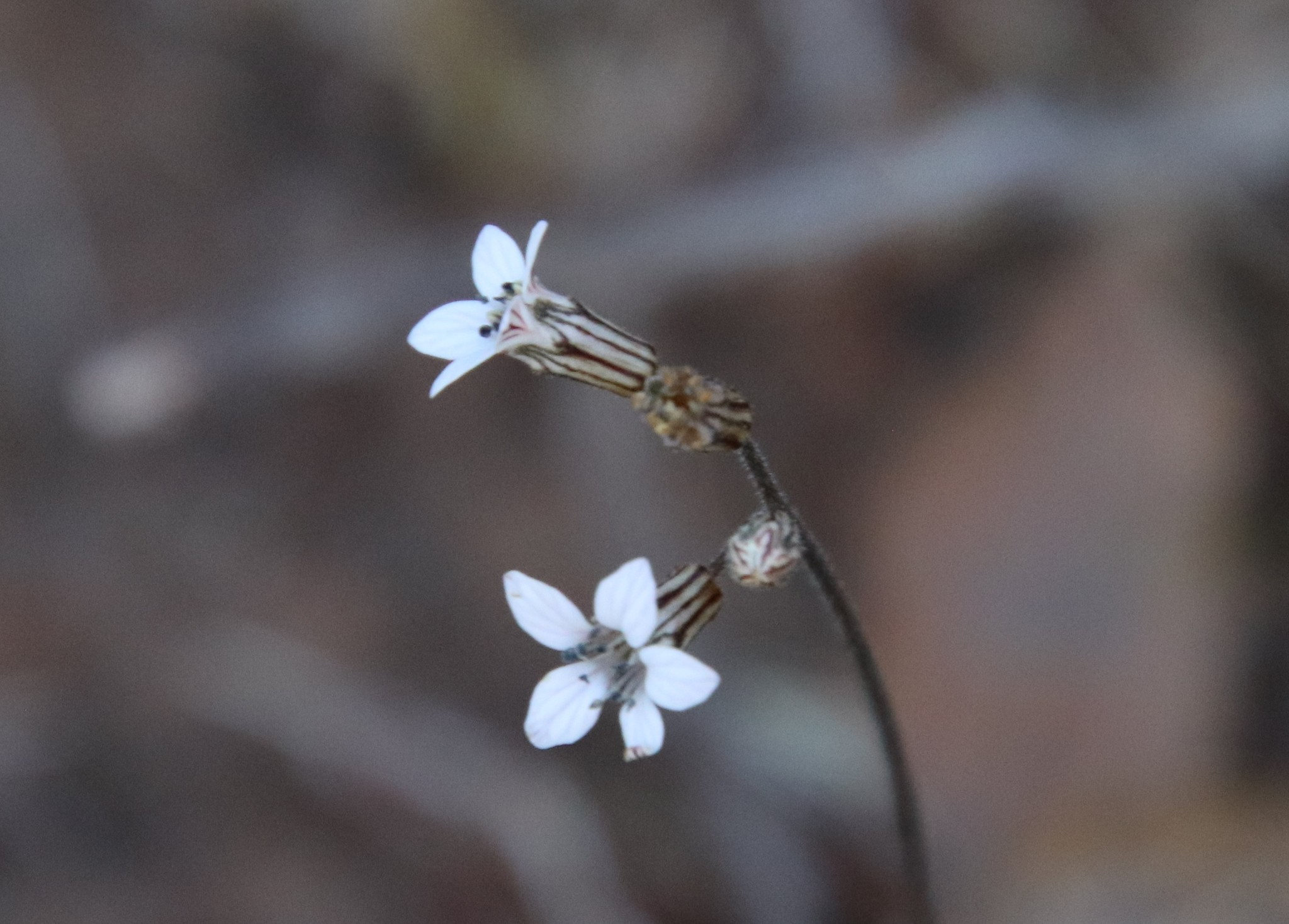
The flowers and inflorescence

== See also ==
- California chaparral and woodlands
