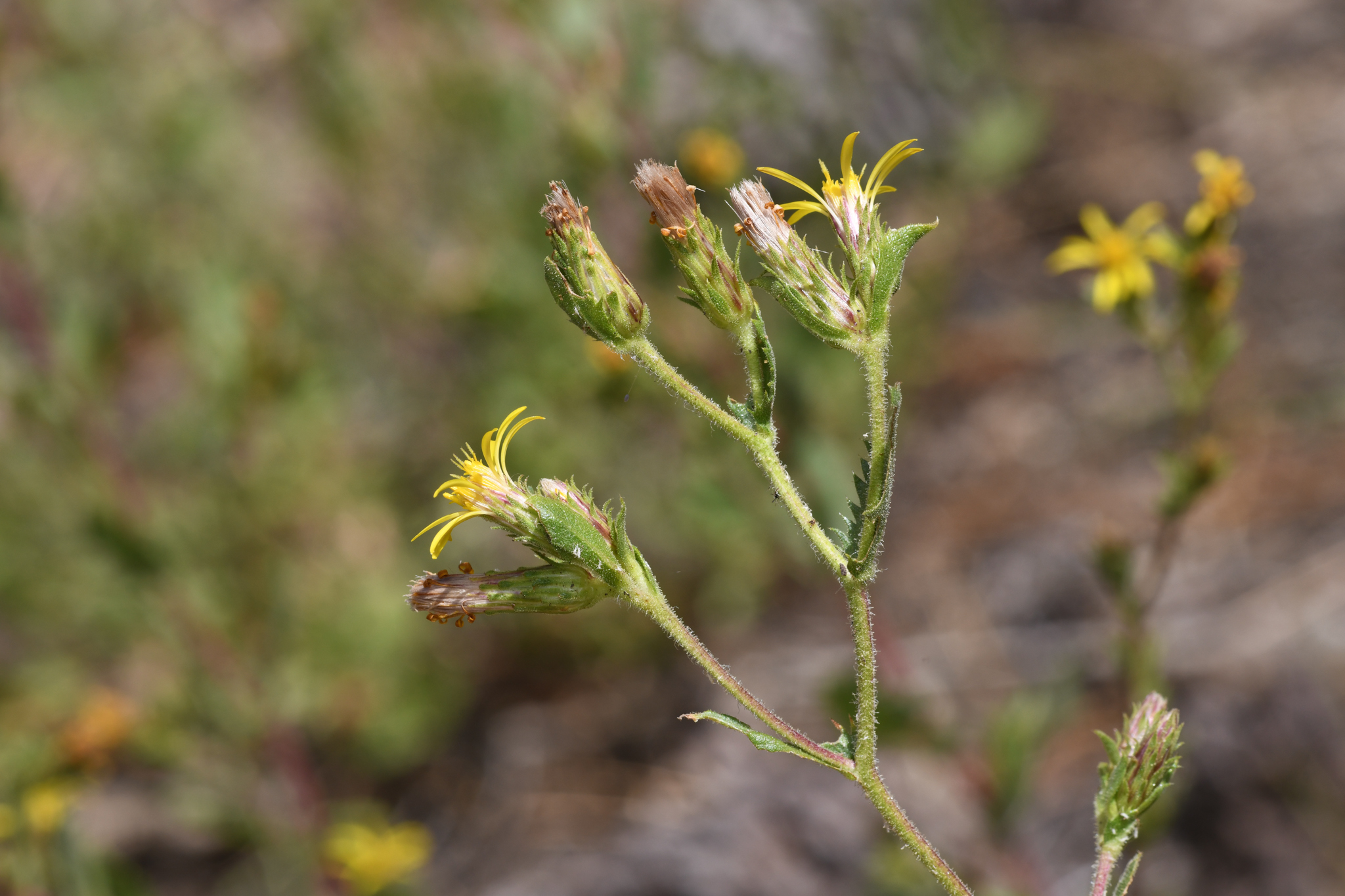
- Adeia whitenyi

Scientific classification
- Kingdom: Plantae
- Clade: Tracheophytes
- Clade: Angiosperms
- Clade: Eudicots
- Clade: Asterids
- Order: Asterales
- Family: Asteraceae
- Subfamily: Asteroideae
- Tribe: Astereae
- Subtribe: Machaerantherinae
- Genus: Adeia; G.L.Nesom (2021)

Species
- Adeia discoidea (J.T.Howell) G.L.Nesom; Adeia whitneyi (A.Gray) G.L.Nesom

= Adeia (plant) =

Genus of flowering plants

Adeia is a genus of flowering plants in the sunflower family, Asteraceae. It includes two species of perennial herbs native to California and Oregon.

- Adeia discoidea (J.T.Howell) G.L.Nesom – California and Oregon
- Adeia whitneyi (A.Gray) G.L.Nesom – California

The genus was described by Guy L. Nesom in 2021 to include the two varieties of Hazardia whitneyi, H. whitneyi var. whitneyi and H. whitneyi var. discoidea, which Nesom recognized as distinct species. The genus name comes from the Greek word adeia, meaning safety, security, and freedom from fear.

They differ from species of Hazardia, which are mostly shrubs, in having white bark, ray florets with sterile ovaries (rather than fertile ones), linear to narrowly linear-lanceolate style branch (disc floret) collecting appendages (rather than ovate-triangular ones), and elliptic-oblong to narrowly oblong-obovate and strongly flattened achenes with 8 to 12 nerves (rather than mostly subcylindric to fusiform or narrowly obovoid achenes with 4 to 5 nerves).
