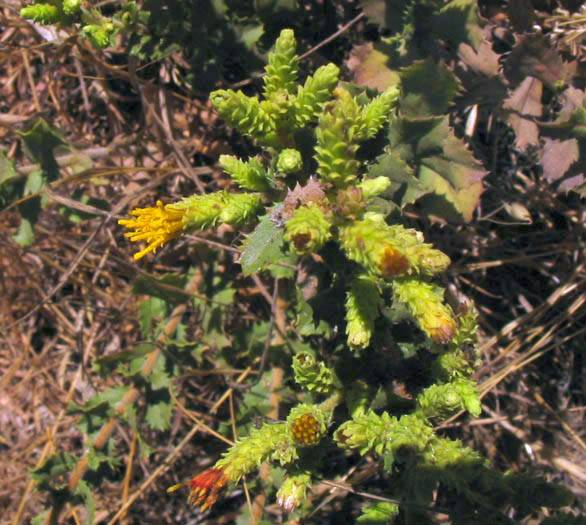
- Hazardia squarrosa

Scientific classification
- Kingdom: Plantae
- Clade: Embryophytes
- Clade: Tracheophytes
- Clade: Spermatophytes
- Clade: Angiosperms
- Clade: Eudicots
- Clade: Asterids
- Order: Asterales
- Family: Asteraceae
- Subfamily: Asteroideae
- Tribe: Astereae
- Subtribe: Machaerantherinae
- Genus: Hazardia; Greene (1887)

Species
- 11; see text

Synonyms
- Haplopappus sect. Hazardia (Greene) H.M.Hall

= Hazardia (plant) =

Bristleweeds

Genus of flowering plants

Hazardia is a small genus of North American flowering plants in the family Asteraceae. Plants in this genus may be called bristleweeds or goldenbushes.

Hazardia is native to the western United States and northwestern Mexico, including offshore islands in the Pacific. The genus is especially common in California, and on the Baja California Peninsula in Mexico, with a few species extending into Oregon and Nevada. They are short, hardy perennials or small leafy shrubs. Some species have sharply toothed leaves. Generally they bear yellow flowers, with some having ray florets and appearing somewhat daisylike while others have only disc florets.

The genus was named after amateur botanist Barclay Hazard of Santa Barbara, 1852–1938.

== Species ==
11 species are accepted.

- Hazardia berberidis Greene - Baja California, Baja California Sur
- Hazardia cana Greene - island hazardia, San Clemente Island hazardia - San Clemente Island and Guadalupe Island
- Hazardia detonsa Greene - island bristleweed - Santa Cruz Island
- Hazardia enormidens (Moran) W.D.Clark – Baja California
- Hazardia ferrisiae (S.F.Blake) W.D.Clark - Baja California
- Hazardia odontolepis (Moran) W.D.Clark – Baja California
- Hazardia orcuttii Greene - Baja California, San Diego County
- Hazardia rosarica (Moran) W.D.Clark - Baja California
- Hazardia squarrosa (Hook. & Arn.) Greene - sawtooth goldenbush - southern California
- Hazardia stenolepis (H.M.Hall) Hoover - serpentine bristleweed - California
- Hazardia vernicosa (Brandegee) W.D.Clark - Baja California

=== Formerly placed here ===
- Adeia discoidea (J.T.Howell) G.L.Nesom (as Hazardia whitneyi var. discoidea (J.T.Howell) W.D.Clark) – California and Oregon
- Adeia whitneyi (A.Gray) G.L.Nesom (as Hazardia whitneyi (A.Gray) Greene) – California
- Adiaphila brickellioides (S.F.Blake) G.L.Nesom (as Hazardia brickellioides (S.F.Blake) W.D.Clark ) - brickellbush goldenweed – California and Nevada
