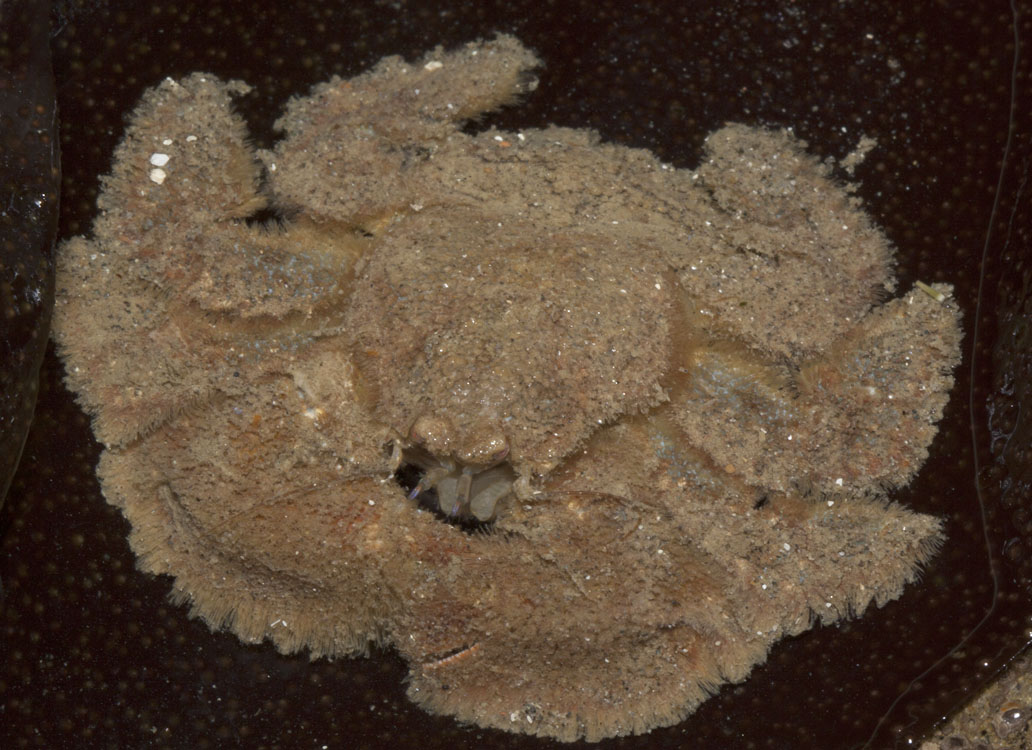

Scientific classification
- Domain: Eukaryota
- Kingdom: Animalia
- Phylum: Arthropoda
- Class: Malacostraca
- Order: Decapoda
- Suborder: Pleocyemata
- Infraorder: Anomura
- Family: Lithodidae
- Genus: Hapalogaster
- Species: H. cavicauda

Binomial name
- Hapalogaster cavicauda Stimpson, 1859

= Hapalogaster cavicauda =

Species of king crab

Hapalogaster cavicauda is a species of king crab that lives on the Pacific coast of North America.

== Description ==
Hapalogaster cavicauda is a flattened, crab-like crustacean. It grows to a carapace width of 20 millimetres (0.79 in), and is covered in setae (hairs). The hairs on the third maxilliped are used to filter plankton from the water, which the animal feeds on, together with algae scraped from rocks. The females carry their eggs on the tail in winter.

== Distribution ==
H. cavicauda is found along the Pacific coast of North America from Cape Mendocino in the north, through the Channel Islands, to Isla San Jerónimo, Mexico in the south. It usually lives beneath rocks in the lower part of the intertidal zone.

The related species H. mertensii occurs further north, but shares a similar ecology to that of H. cavicauda.

== Taxonomy ==
The species was first described by William Stimpson in 1859 (as a preprint of an article published in 1862). He based the description on a specimen collected by "Mr. A. S. Taylor" at Monterey, California.
