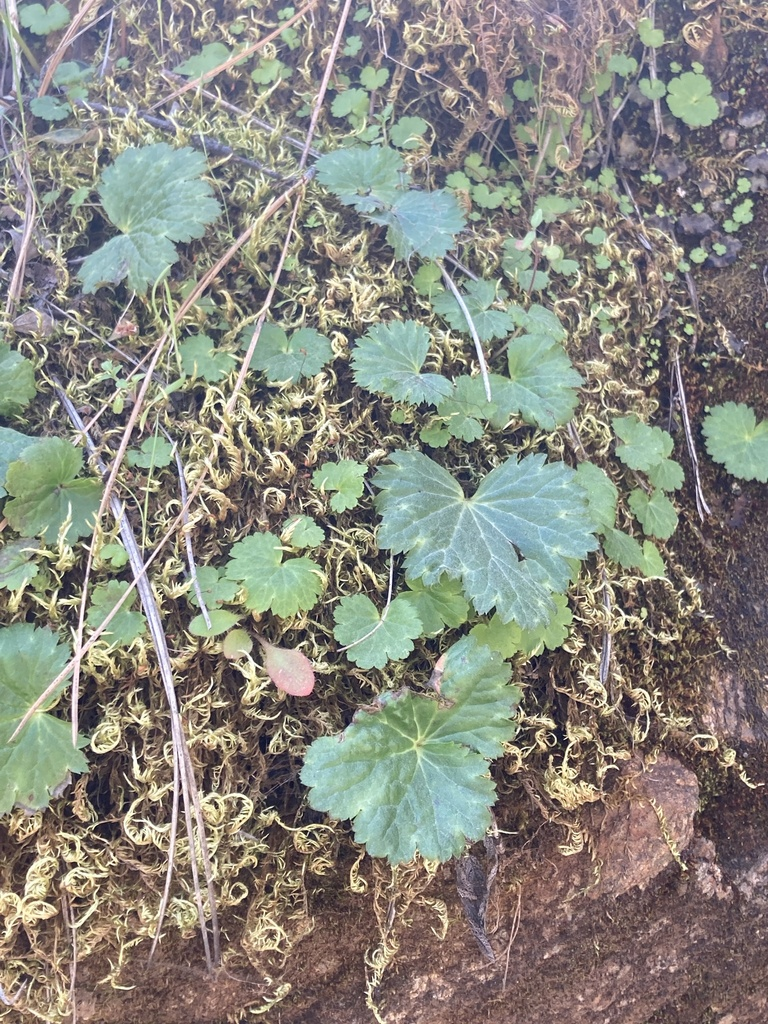

Scientific classification
- Kingdom: Plantae
- Clade: Tracheophytes
- Clade: Angiosperms
- Clade: Eudicots
- Order: Saxifragales
- Family: Saxifragaceae
- Genus: Jepsonia
- Species: J. heterandra

Binomial name
- Jepsonia heterandra Eastw.

= Jepsonia heterandra =

Species of flowering plant

Jepsonia heterandra is an uncommon species of flowering plant in the saxifrage family known by the common name foothill jepsonia. It is endemic to the foothills of the central section of the Sierra Nevada in California, where it grows in woodland and forest. This is a small perennial plant growing two or three leaves from a branching caudex. The flat, green leaves are round or kidney-shaped with frilly lobes along the edges. Flowering occurs in fall. The plant produces an inflorescence of several pinkish flowers on a tall peduncle. The fruit is a red-striped green or pink capsule.
