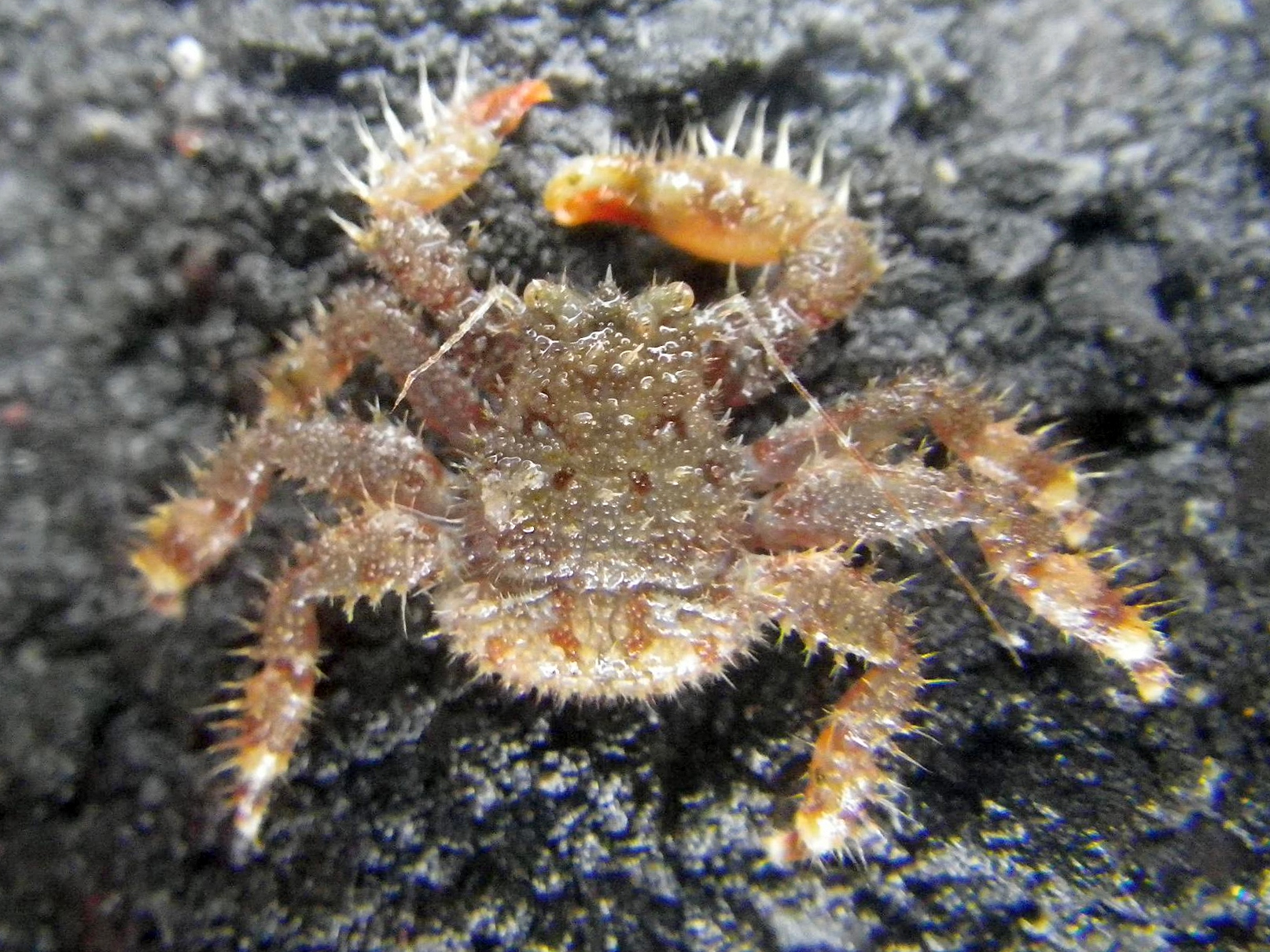
- Hapalogaster grebnitzkii

Scientific classification
- Kingdom: Animalia
- Phylum: Arthropoda
- Clade: Pancrustacea
- Class: Malacostraca
- Order: Decapoda
- Suborder: Pleocyemata
- Infraorder: Anomura
- Family: Lithodidae
- Subfamily: Hapalogastrinae
- Genus: Hapalogaster; Brandt, 1850

Type species
- Hapalogaster mertensii Brandt, 1850

= Hapalogaster =

Genus of king crabs

Hapalogaster is a genus of king crabs, containing the following four species:

Image	Scientific name	Common name	Distribution	References
	Hapalogaster cavicauda Stimpson, 1859		California and Mexico	
	Hapalogaster dentata (De Haan, 1849)	Stone crab, spiny stone crab	Yellow Sea, Sea of Japan, coast of Mainland Japan	
	Hapalogaster grebnitzkii Schalfeew, 1892		Sea of Japan to British Columbia	
	Hapalogaster mertensii Brandt, 1850			
