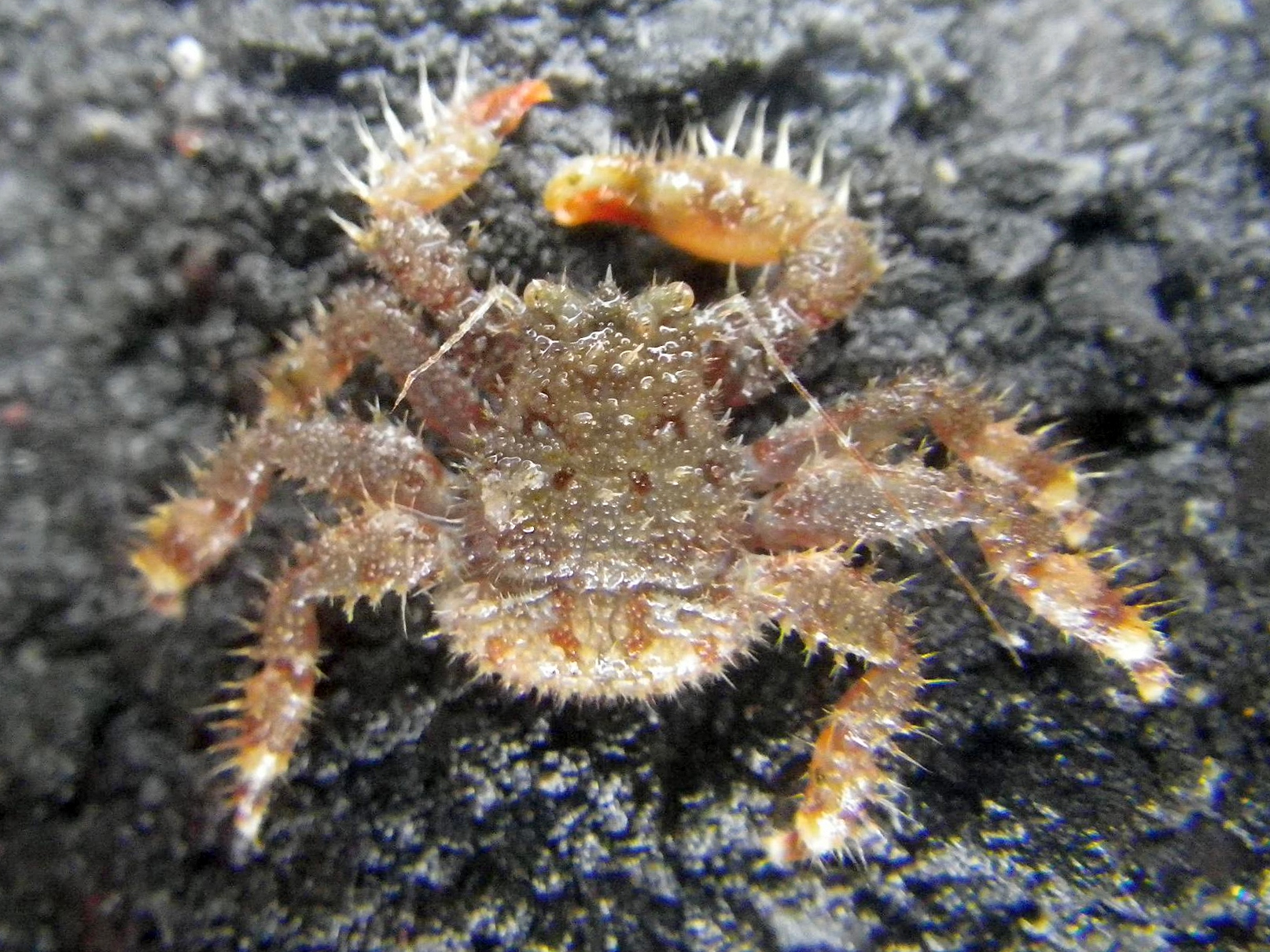

Scientific classification
- Kingdom: Animalia
- Phylum: Arthropoda
- Clade: Pancrustacea
- Class: Malacostraca
- Order: Decapoda
- Suborder: Pleocyemata
- Infraorder: Anomura
- Family: Lithodidae
- Genus: Hapalogaster
- Species: H. grebnitzkii

Binomial name
- Hapalogaster grebnitzkii Schalfeew, 1892

= Hapalogaster grebnitzkii =

Species of king crab

Hapalogaster grebnitzkii, commonly known as the fuzzy lithode crab, is a species of king crab in the subfamily Hapalogastrinae. It is endemic to the north Pacific Ocean – from the northern Sea of Japan in the west to northern British Columbia in the east. It has been found to a depth of 90 m (300 ft).

== Description ==
Hapalogaster grebnitzkii has a relatively flat carapace which is longer than it is wide and is covered in setae. The male's carapace measures about 23 mm × 24 mm (0.91 in × 0.94 in). Its abdomen is pale brown and covered in setae. Like all king crabs, the male's abdomen is symmetrical while the female's has larger segments on the left side than the right.

== Parasites ==
Like several other king crab species, Hapalogaster grebnitzkii is host to parasitic dinoflagellates in the genus Hematodinium.
