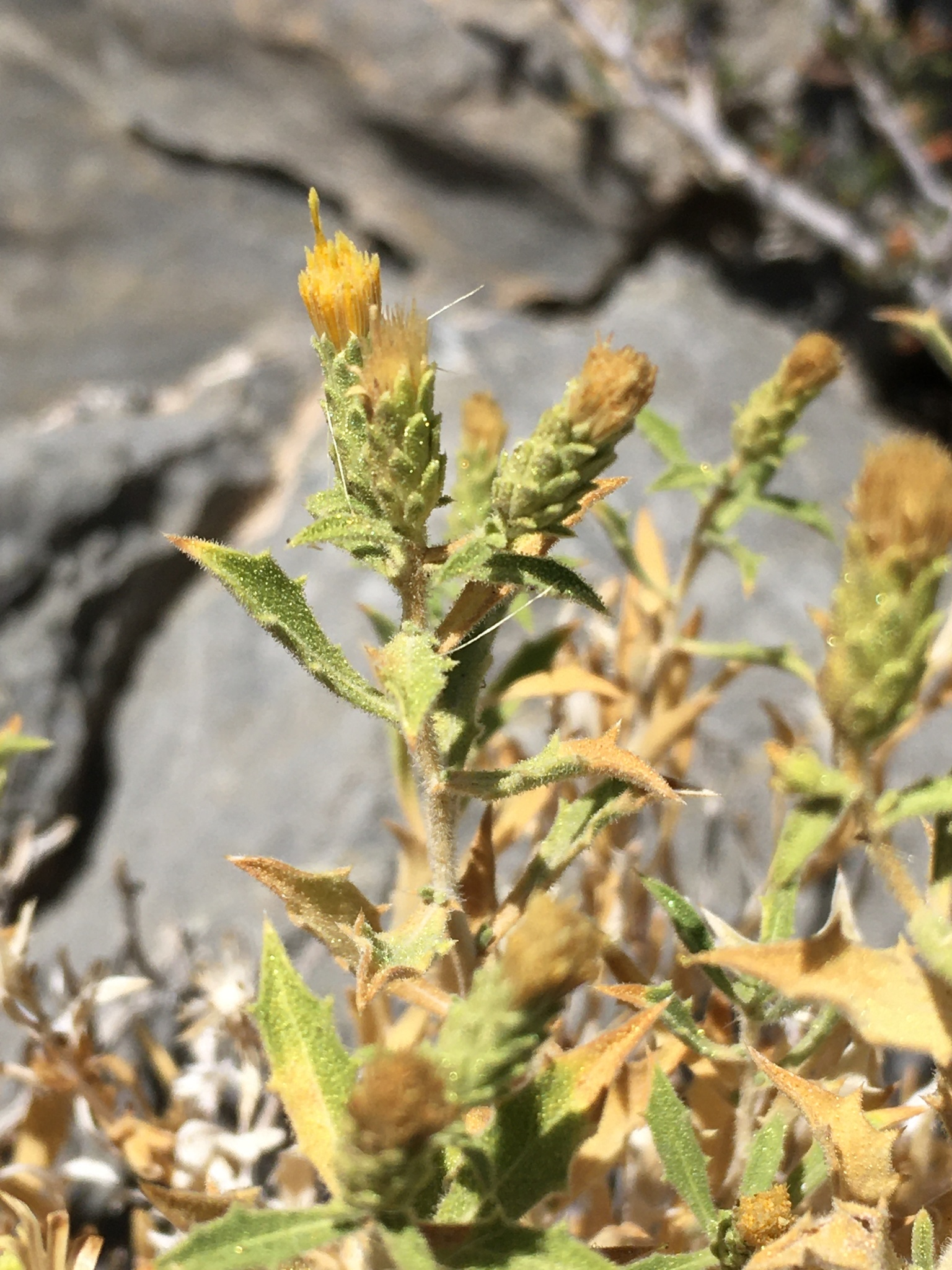

Conservation status
- Vulnerable (NatureServe)

Scientific classification
- Kingdom: Plantae
- Clade: Tracheophytes
- Clade: Angiosperms
- Clade: Eudicots
- Clade: Asterids
- Order: Asterales
- Family: Asteraceae
- Tribe: Astereae
- Subtribe: Machaerantherinae
- Genus: Adiaphila; G.L.Nesom (2021)
- Species: A. brickellioides

Binomial name
- Adiaphila brickellioides (S.F.Blake) G.L.Nesom (2021)

Synonyms
- Haplopappus brickellioides S.F.Blake (1922); Hazardia brickellioides (S.F.Blake) W.D.Clark (1979)

= Adiaphila =

Species of flowering plant

Adiaphila brickellioides is a species of shrub in the family Asteraceae known by the common name brickellbush goldenweed. It is native to the Mojave Desert of California and Nevada, where it grows in rocky limestone habitat.

Adiaphila brickellioides is a shrub producing a stem 20–80 centimetres (7.9–31.5 in) tall which is coated in rough hairs often tipped with yellowish resin glands. The hairy, leathery leaves are oval, up to about 3.5 centimetres (1.4 in) long, and usually lined with spiny teeth. The plant produces several flower heads each roughly a centimeter (0.4 inches) wide when open. The flower head is lined with roughly hairy, glandular phyllaries and contains disc florets surrounded with a fringe of tiny yellow ray florets. The fruit is a hairy white achene topped with a pappus of many white or brown bristles.

The species was first described as Haplopappus brickellioides in 1922 by Sidney Fay Blake. In 1979 W. Dennis Clark placed it in genus Hazardia as Hazardia brickellioides. In 2021 Guy L. Nesom placed it in its own genus, Adiaphila.
