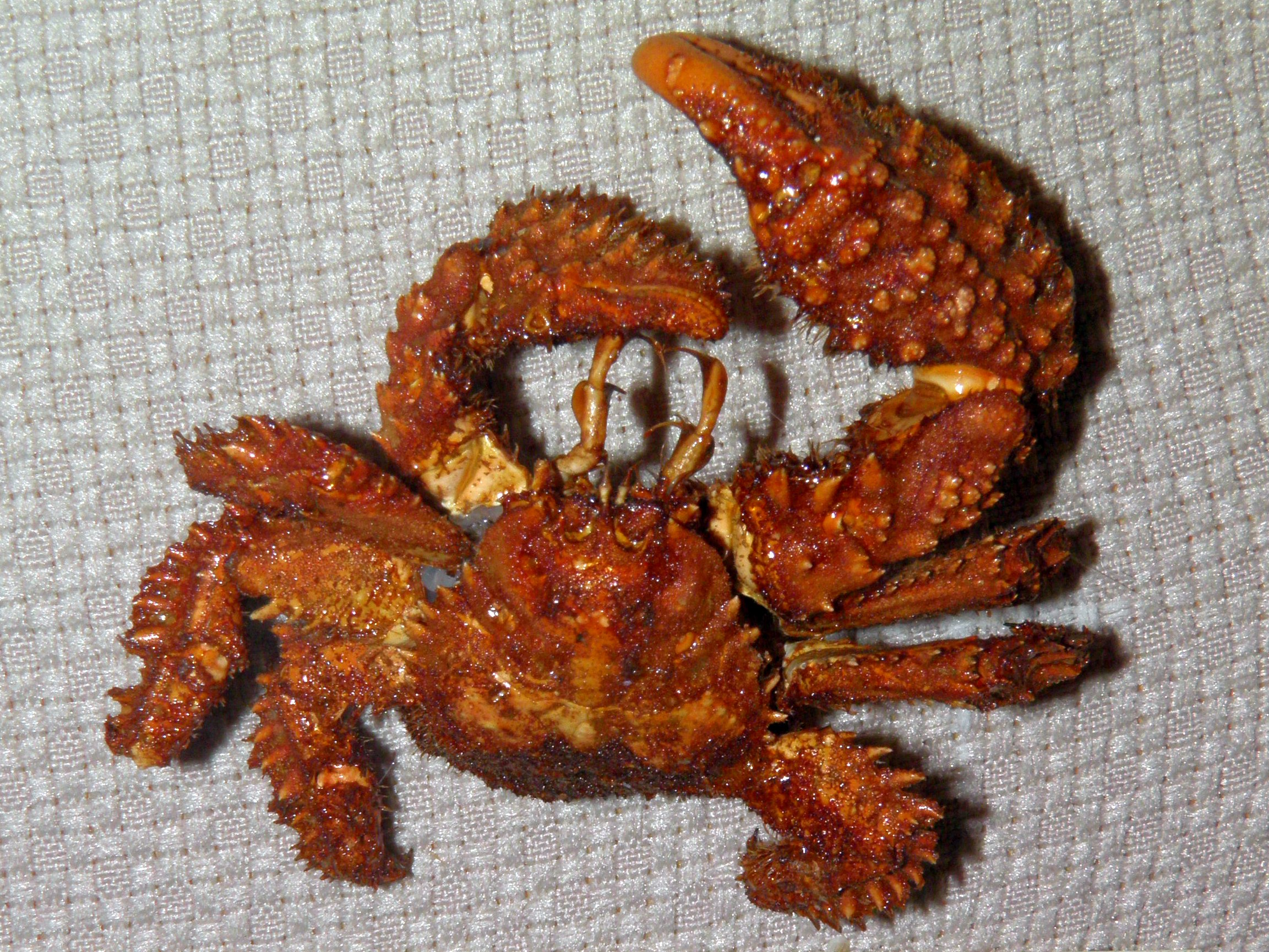

Scientific classification
- Kingdom: Animalia
- Phylum: Arthropoda
- Clade: Pancrustacea
- Class: Malacostraca
- Order: Decapoda
- Suborder: Pleocyemata
- Infraorder: Anomura
- Family: Lithodidae
- Genus: Hapalogaster
- Species: H. dentata

Binomial name
- Hapalogaster dentata (De Haan, 1849)

= Hapalogaster dentata =

Species of king crab

Hapalogaster dentata, also called the stone crab or the spiny stone crab, is a species of king crab. It is found in shallow waters in the Yellow Sea on the western Korean Peninsula, Peter the Great Gulf in the Sea of Japan, and along the coast of Japan as far north as Hokkaido and as far south as Kyushu.
