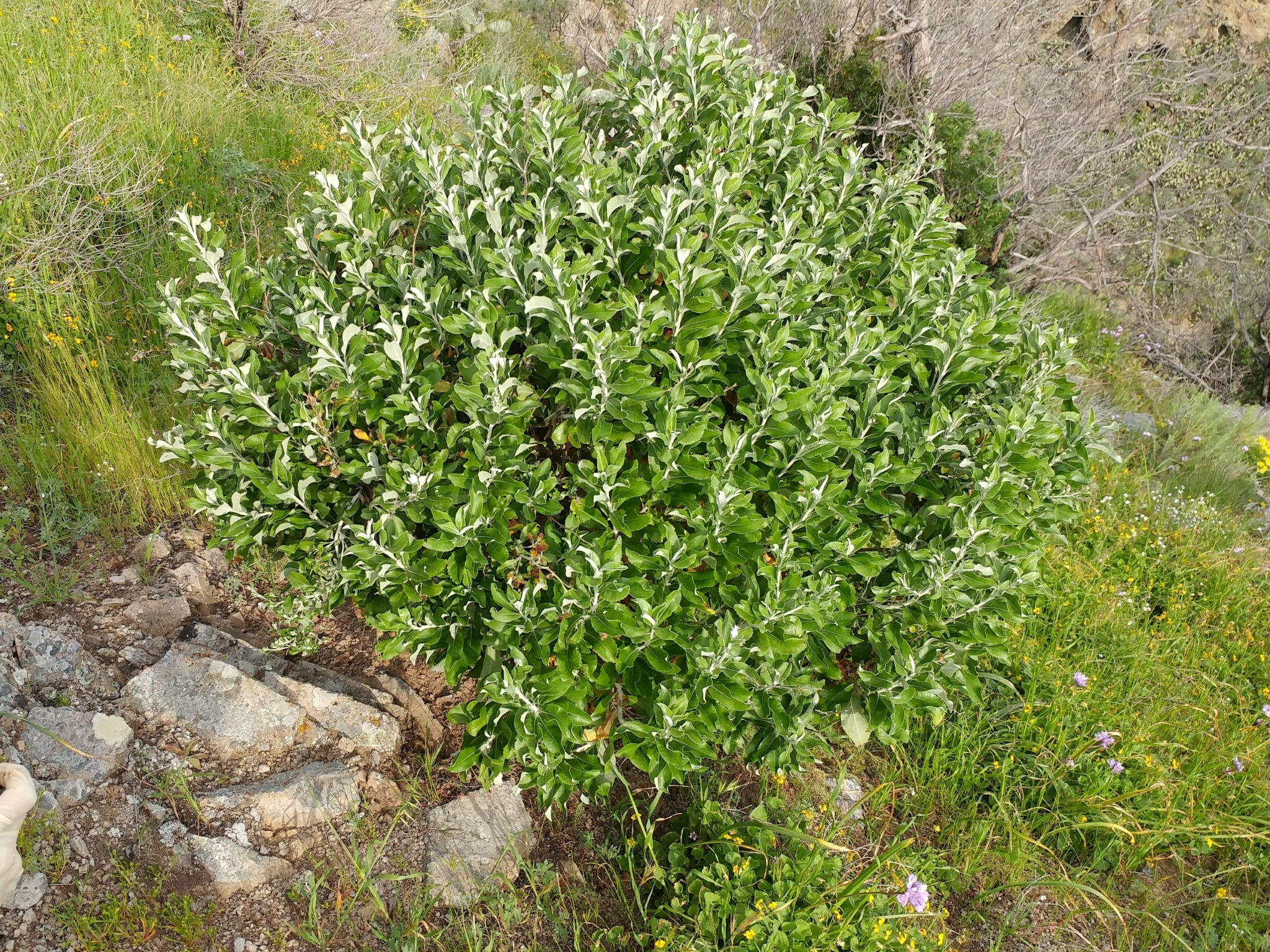

Conservation status
- Imperiled (NatureServe)

Scientific classification
- Kingdom: Plantae
- Clade: Tracheophytes
- Clade: Angiosperms
- Clade: Eudicots
- Clade: Asterids
- Order: Asterales
- Family: Asteraceae
- Genus: Hazardia
- Species: H. cana

Binomial name
- Hazardia cana (Gray) Greene 1887

Synonyms
- Corethrogyne cana (A.Gray) Greene; Diplostephium canum A.Gray; Haplopappus canus (A.Gray) S.F.Blake; Aplopappus canus (A.Gray) S.F.Blake

= Hazardia cana =

Species of flowering plant

Hazardia cana is a rare North American species of shrubs in the family Asteraceae known by the common names Guadalupe hazardia, San Clemente Island hazardia, or simply island hazardia. It is native to San Clemente Island, one of the Channel Islands of California, and to Guadalupe Island (part of the State of Baja California).

Hazardia cana is a bushy shrub reaching 1.5–2 metres (4 ft 11 in – 6 ft 7 in) high. It has woolly, glandular herbage of oblong, sometimes finely toothed leaves 4–12 centimetres (1.6–4.7 in) long. At the ends of its grayish stems it produces cylindrical flower heads. Each flower head has several rows of dark-colored phyllaries and an open end revealing disc florets and longer protruding ray florets. The florets are yellow when young but may age to red or purple. The main threat to this species on San Clemente Island was the presence of feral goats. The goats have been removed from the island and the plant is recovering.
