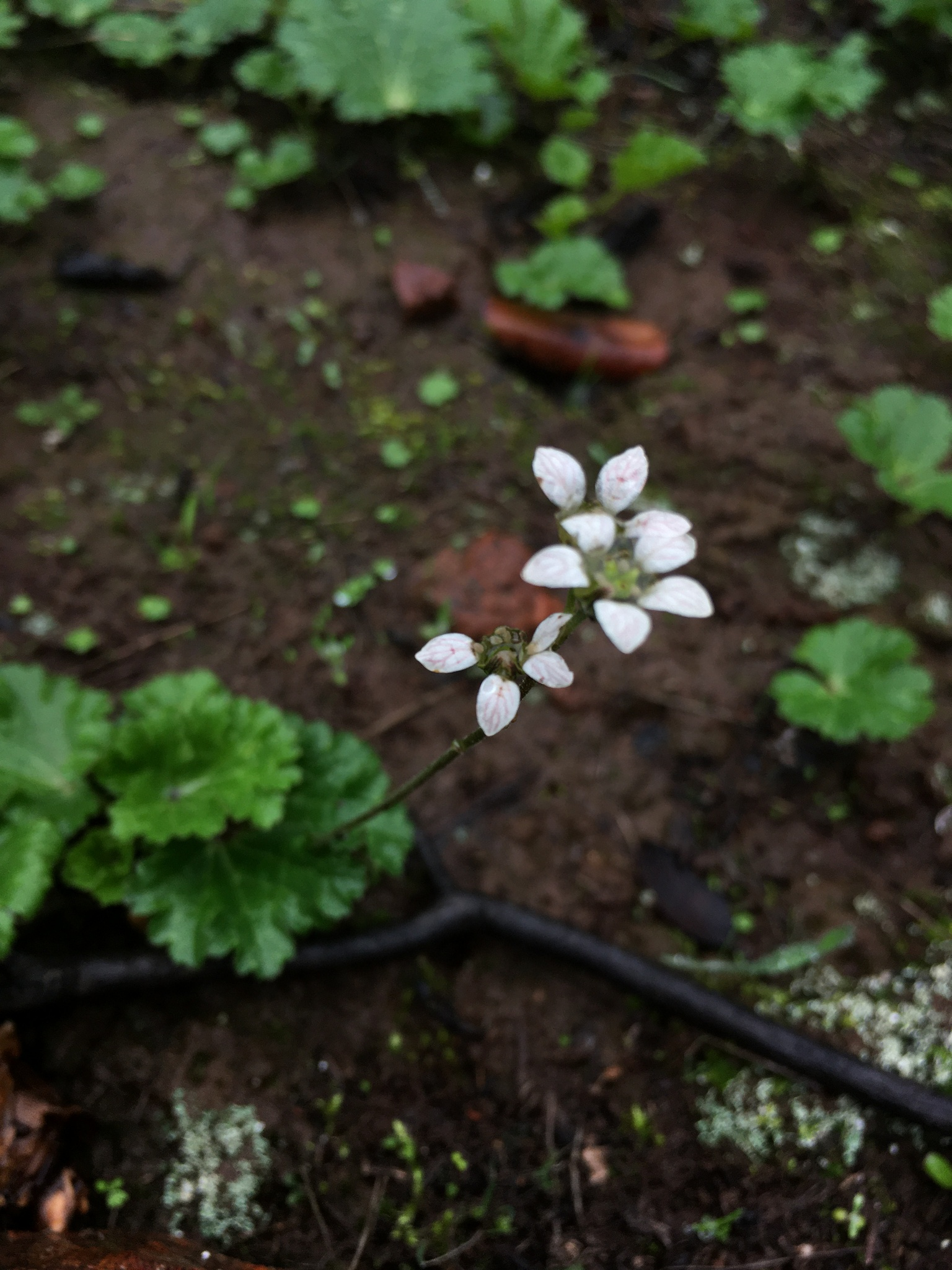

Scientific classification
- Kingdom: Plantae
- Clade: Tracheophytes
- Clade: Angiosperms
- Clade: Eudicots
- Order: Saxifragales
- Family: Saxifragaceae
- Genus: Jepsonia
- Species: J. malvifolia

Binomial name
- Jepsonia malvifolia (Greene) Small

= Jepsonia malvifolia =

Species of flowering plant

Jepsonia malvifolia is an uncommon species of flowering plant in the saxifrage family known by the common name island jepsonia or island button-saxifrage. It is found only on the Channel Islands of California and Guadalupe Island off Baja California. It grows in exposed rock and clay soils on the chaparral and scrub slopes of the islands. This is a small perennial herb growing up to 10 inches (25 centimetres) tall. It produces two or three leaves from a flat caudex. The green leaves are round or kidney-shaped and edged with ruffled lobes. The plant flowers in fall, producing an inflorescence on a tall peduncle. The tiny flowers have red-veined white, yellowish, or pinkish petals. The fruit is a tan-striped greenish capsule. Its chromosome number is 2n=14.
