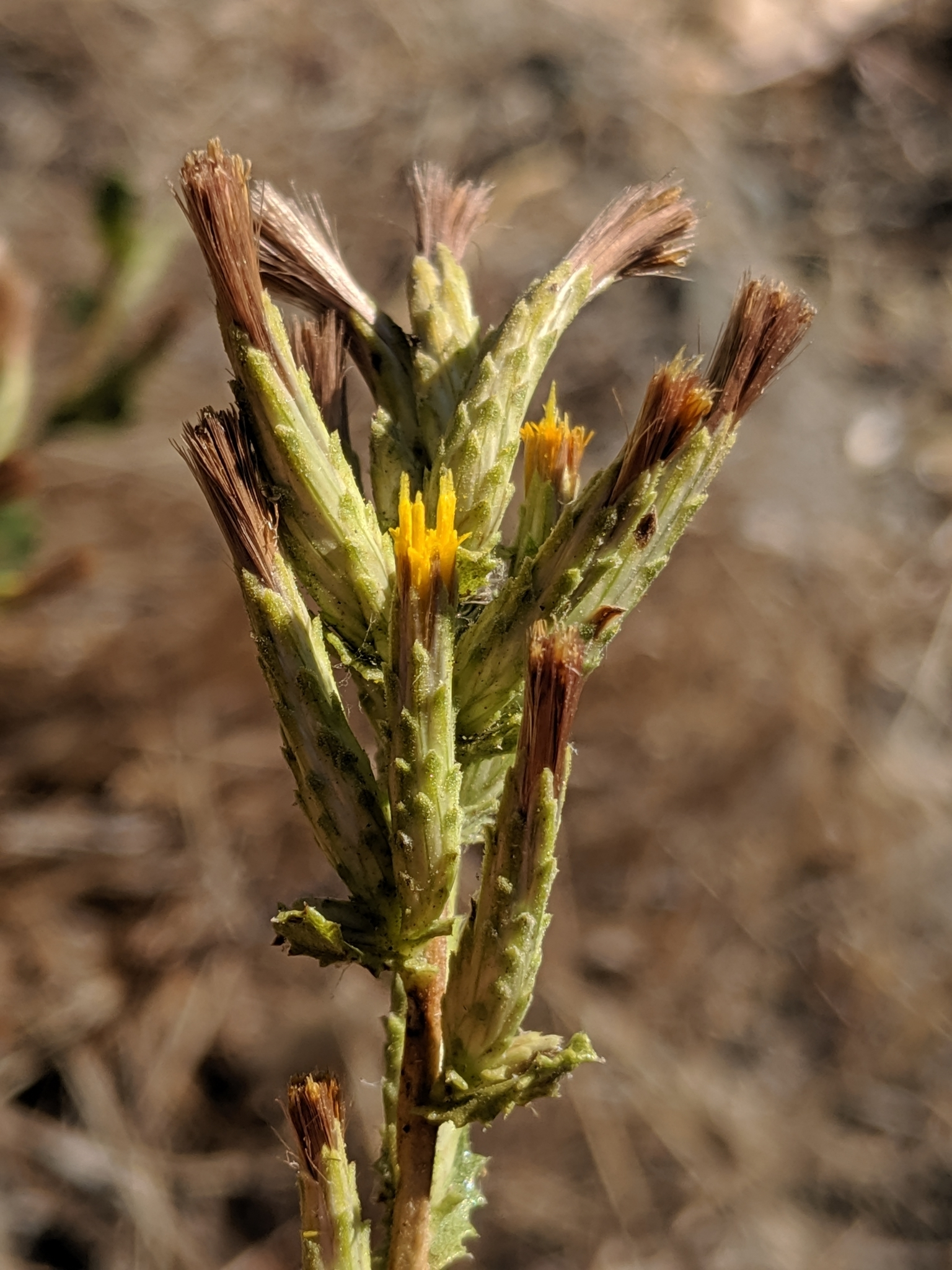
- In California

Scientific classification
- Kingdom: Plantae
- Clade: Tracheophytes
- Clade: Angiosperms
- Clade: Eudicots
- Clade: Asterids
- Order: Asterales
- Family: Asteraceae
- Genus: Hazardia
- Species: H. stenolepis

Binomial name
- Hazardia stenolepis (H.M.Hall) Hoover 1970

Synonyms
- Haplopappus squarrosus subsp. stenolepis H.M. Hall 1928

= Hazardia stenolepis =

Species of flowering plant

Hazardia stenolepis, the serpentine bristleweed, is a North American species of shrub in the daisy family. It has been found only in California in the western United States, and in Baja California in northwestern Mexico.

Hazardia stenolepis is a shrub up to 100 cm (39 in) tall. The plant produces numerous flower heads in a dense, elongated array at the top of the plant. Each head contains 8-10 disc flowers but no ray flowers. The species sometimes grows on serpentine soils.
