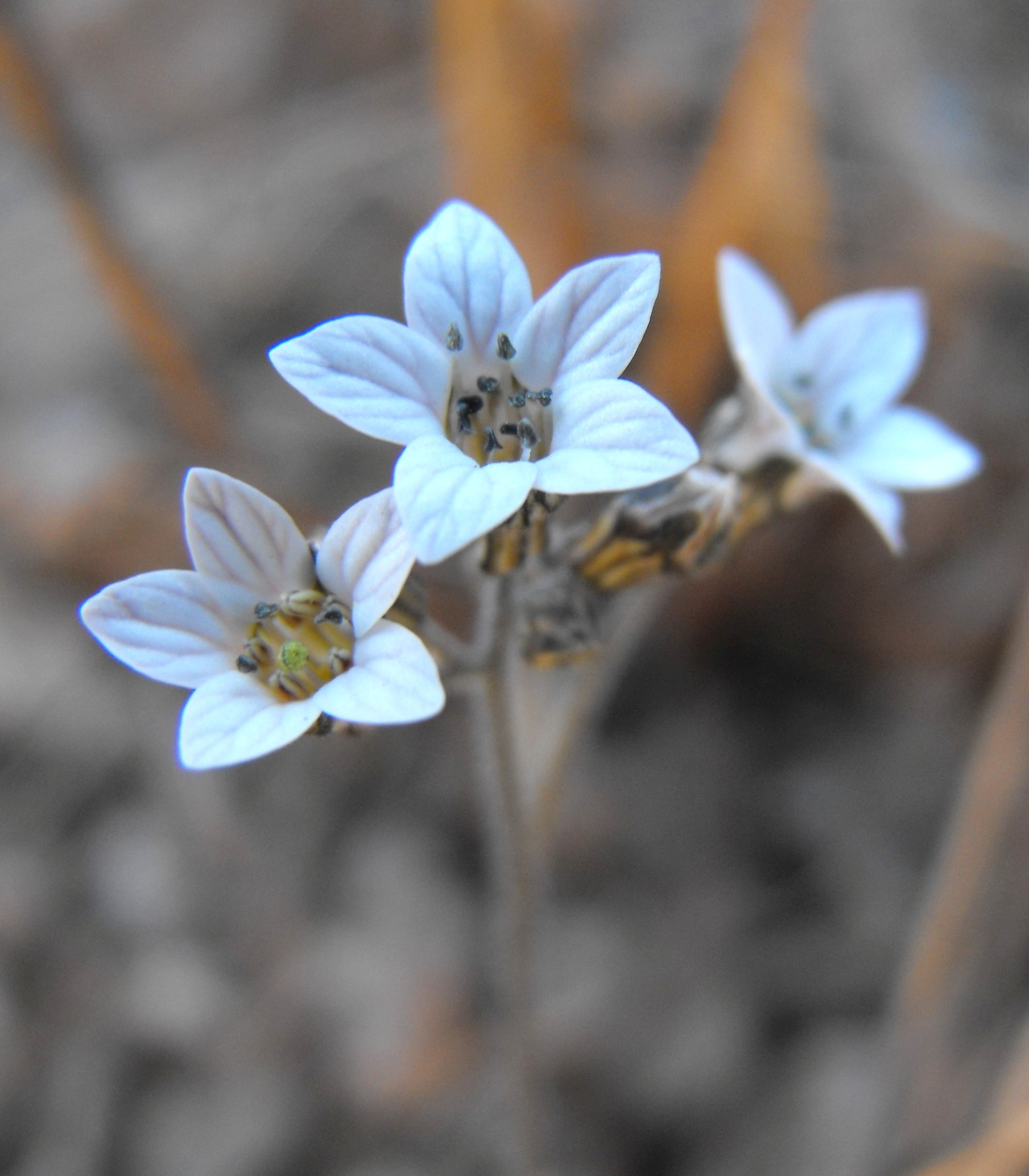
- Jepsonia parryi

Scientific classification
- Kingdom: Plantae
- Clade: Embryophytes
- Clade: Tracheophytes
- Clade: Spermatophytes
- Clade: Angiosperms
- Clade: Eudicots
- Order: Saxifragales
- Family: Saxifragaceae
- Genus: Jepsonia; Small (1896)

= Jepsonia =

Genus of flowering plants

Jepsonia is a small genus of flowering plants containing three species. The Jepsonia is a perennial with a cormlike caudex, toothed leaves, and a cyme inflorescence that blooms in the fall. Jepsonia plants are native to California and Baja California.

Species include:

- Jepsonia heterandra Eastw. – foothill jepsonia, California
- Jepsonia malvifolia (Greene) Small – island jepsonia, Channel Islands of California and Guadalupe Island
- Jepsonia parryi (Torr.) Small – Parry's jepsonia, California and Baja California Norte
