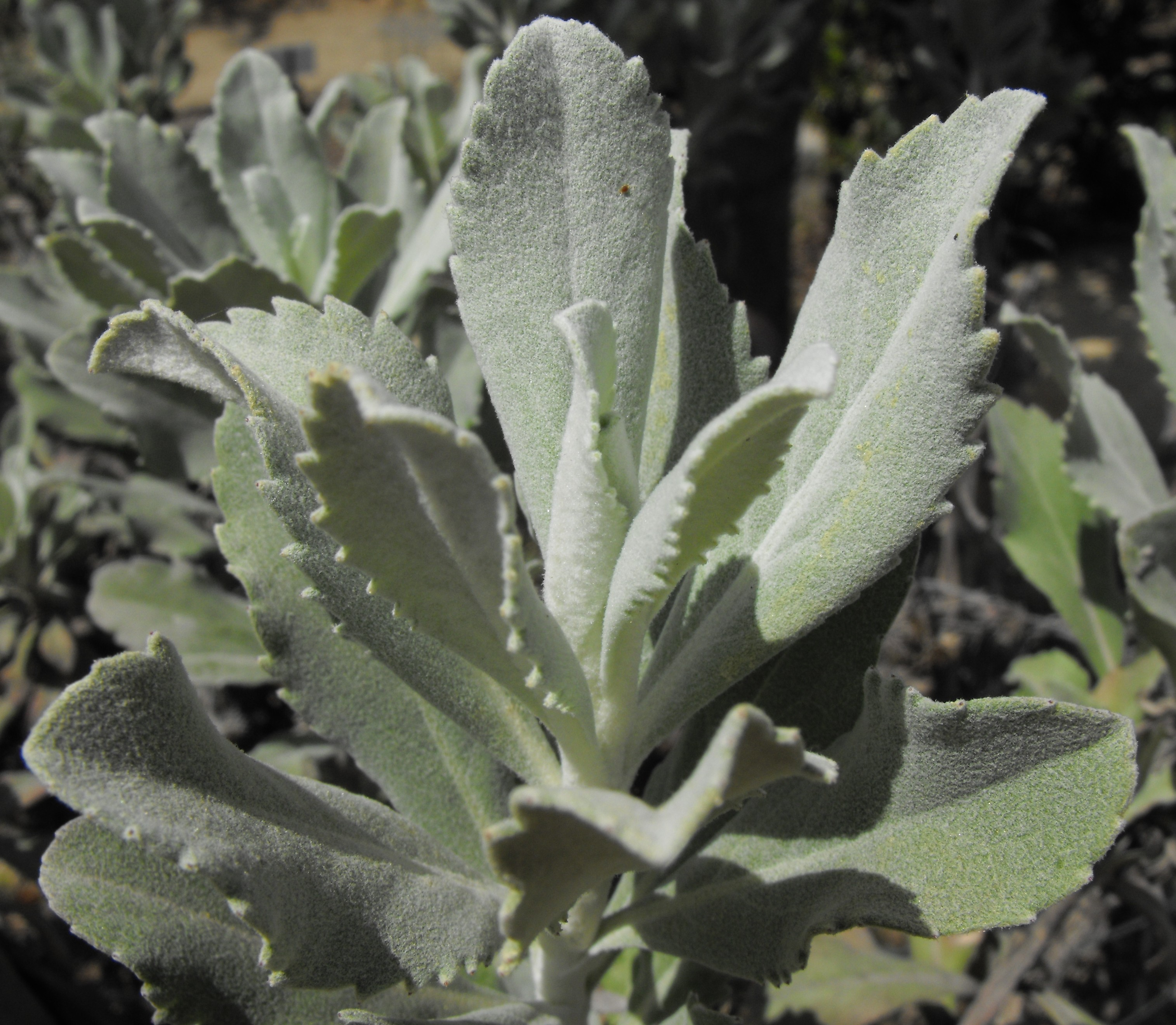

Conservation status
- Apparently Secure (NatureServe)

Scientific classification
- Kingdom: Plantae
- Clade: Tracheophytes
- Clade: Angiosperms
- Clade: Eudicots
- Clade: Asterids
- Order: Asterales
- Family: Asteraceae
- Genus: Hazardia
- Species: H. detonsa

Binomial name
- Hazardia detonsa Greene

Synonyms
- Corethrogyne detonsa Greene; Haplopappus detonsus (Greene) P.H.Raven

= Hazardia detonsa =

Plant species in the daisy family

Hazardia detonsa is a rare species of shrub in the family Asteraceae known by the common name island bristleweed. It is endemic to the Channel Islands of California, having been found on 4 islands (Santa Rosa, Santa Cruz, West Anacapa, and Middle Anacapa).

Hazardia detonsa is a bushy shrub reaching 60 centimetres (24 in) to 2.5 metres (8 ft 2 in) in height. It has densely woolly, glandular herbage of thick, serrated, oval-shaped leaves up to 14 centimetres (5.5 in) long. At the ends of its whitish stems it produces bell-shaped flower heads each about a centimeter long. Each flower head has several rows of white woolly phyllaries and an open end revealing disc florets and longer protruding ray florets. The florets are yellow and may age to red or purple. The main threat to this species on Santa Cruz Island was the presence of feral Santa Cruz sheep. The sheep have been removed, allowing the plant to begin its recovery there.

== Taxonomy ==
In 1887 the botanist Edward Lee Greene described Hazardia detonsa as a species. It is classified in the Hazardia genus within the Asteraceae family. It has two heterotypic synonyms. One, also described by Greene in 1883 is Corethrogyne detonsa. This was moved to Haplopappus by Peter H. Raven in 1963.
