= Hazardia vernicosa =

Scientific classification
- Kingdom: Plantae
- Clade: Tracheophytes
- Clade: Angiosperms
- Clade: Eudicots
- Clade: Asterids
- Order: Asterales
- Family: Asteraceae
- Genus: Hazardia
- Species: H. vernicosa

Binomial name
- Hazardia vernicosa (Brandegee) W.D.Clark 1979

Synonyms
- Haplopappus vernicosus Brandegee 1889; Aplopappus vernicosus Brandegee 1889

Species of flowering plant

Hazardia vernicosa is a Mexican species of shrub in the family Asteraceae. It has been found only in the state of Baja California in northwestern Mexico, specifically near El Rosario. It has not been found in the United States although one of the Mexican populations is less than 10 km (6 1/4 miles) south of the international border.

Hazardia vernicosa is a branching subshrub up to 45 cm (18 in) tall with several stems arising from a woody underground caudex. The plant produces numerous flower heads each head with 3-5 yellow disc flowers plus 3-5 ray flowers.
