= Hazardia ferrisiae =

Scientific classification
- Kingdom: Plantae
- Clade: Tracheophytes
- Clade: Angiosperms
- Clade: Eudicots
- Clade: Asterids
- Order: Asterales
- Family: Asteraceae
- Genus: Hazardia
- Species: H. ferrisiae

Binomial name
- Hazardia ferrisiae (S.F.Blake) W.D.Clark 1979

Synonyms
- Haplopappus ferrisiae S.F. Blake; Aplopappus ferrisiae S.F. Blake

Species of flowering plant

Hazardia ferrisiae is a Mexican species of shrub in the family Asteraceae. It has been found only in the state of Baja California in northwestern Mexico.

Hazardia ferrisiae grows on the coastal plain on the Pacific side of the peninsula. The plant produces flower heads singly or in small clusters of 2 or 3, each head with 5-6 disc flowers but no ray flowers.
