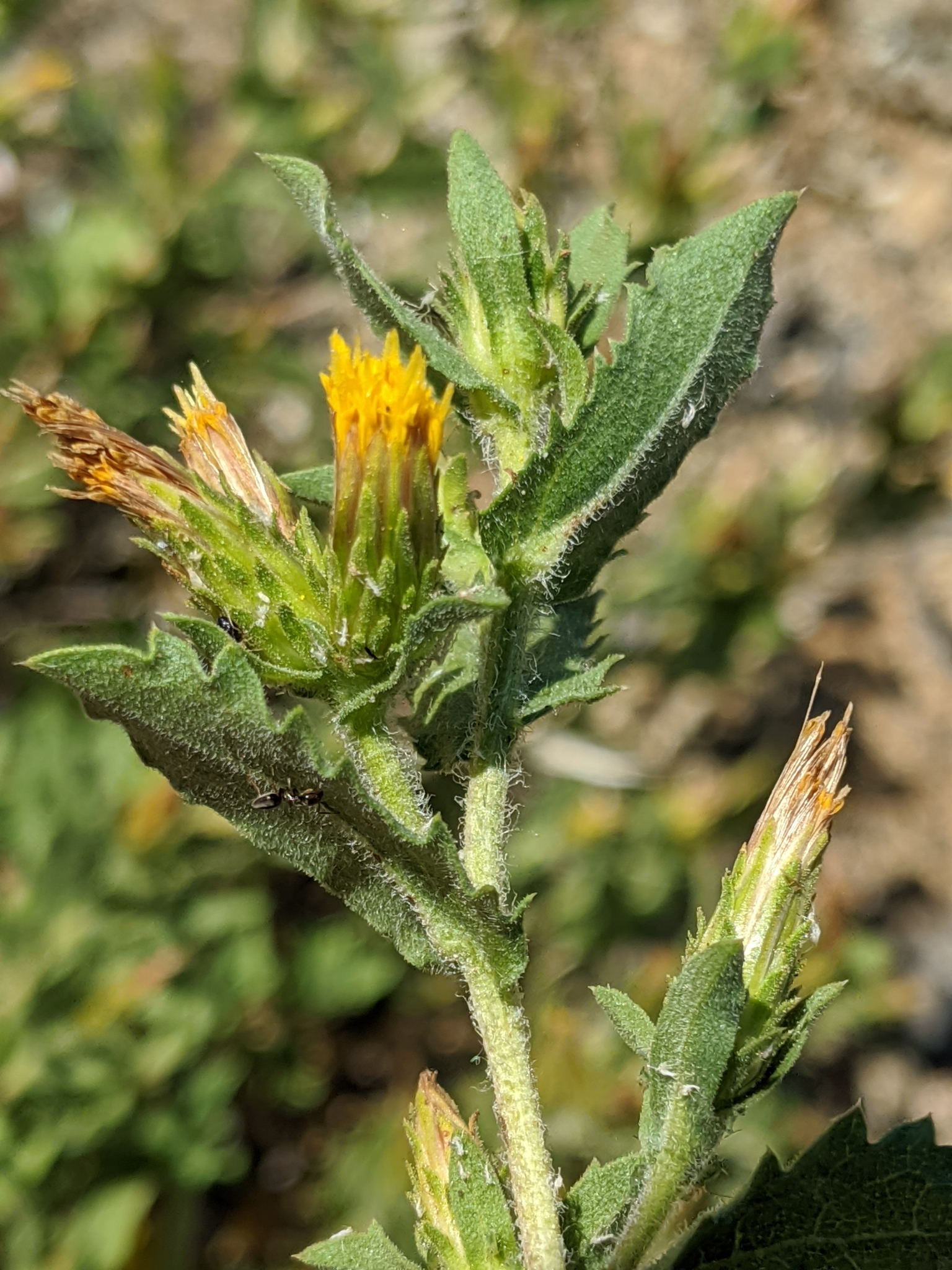

Scientific classification
- Kingdom: Plantae
- Clade: Tracheophytes
- Clade: Angiosperms
- Clade: Eudicots
- Clade: Asterids
- Order: Asterales
- Family: Asteraceae
- Tribe: Astereae
- Subtribe: Machaerantherinae
- Genus: Adeia
- Species: A. discoidea

Binomial name
- Adeia discoidea (J.T.Howell) G.L.Nesom (2021)

Synonyms
- Haplopappus whitneyi var. discoideus J.T.Howell (1950); Haplopappus whitneyi subsp. discoideus (J.T.Howell) D.D.Keck (1958); Hazardia whitneyi var. discoidea (J.T.Howell) W.D.Clark (1979)

= Adeia discoidea =

Species of flowering plant

Adeia discoidea is a species of flowering plant in the sunflower family, Asteraceae. It is a perennial herb or subshrub native to California and Oregon.

It is native the Northern Coast Ranges and Klamath Ranges of northwestern California and adjacent Oregon, where it grows in open montane conifer forest from 1000 to 2500 meters elevation.

The taxon was first described as Haplopappus whitneyi var. discoideus in 1950, and was renamed Hazardia whitneyi var. discoidea in 1979. In 2021, botanist Guy L. Nesom transferred Hazardia whitneyi to the newly erected genus Adeia as Adeia whitneyi, and raised var. discoidea to species rank as Adeia discoidea.
