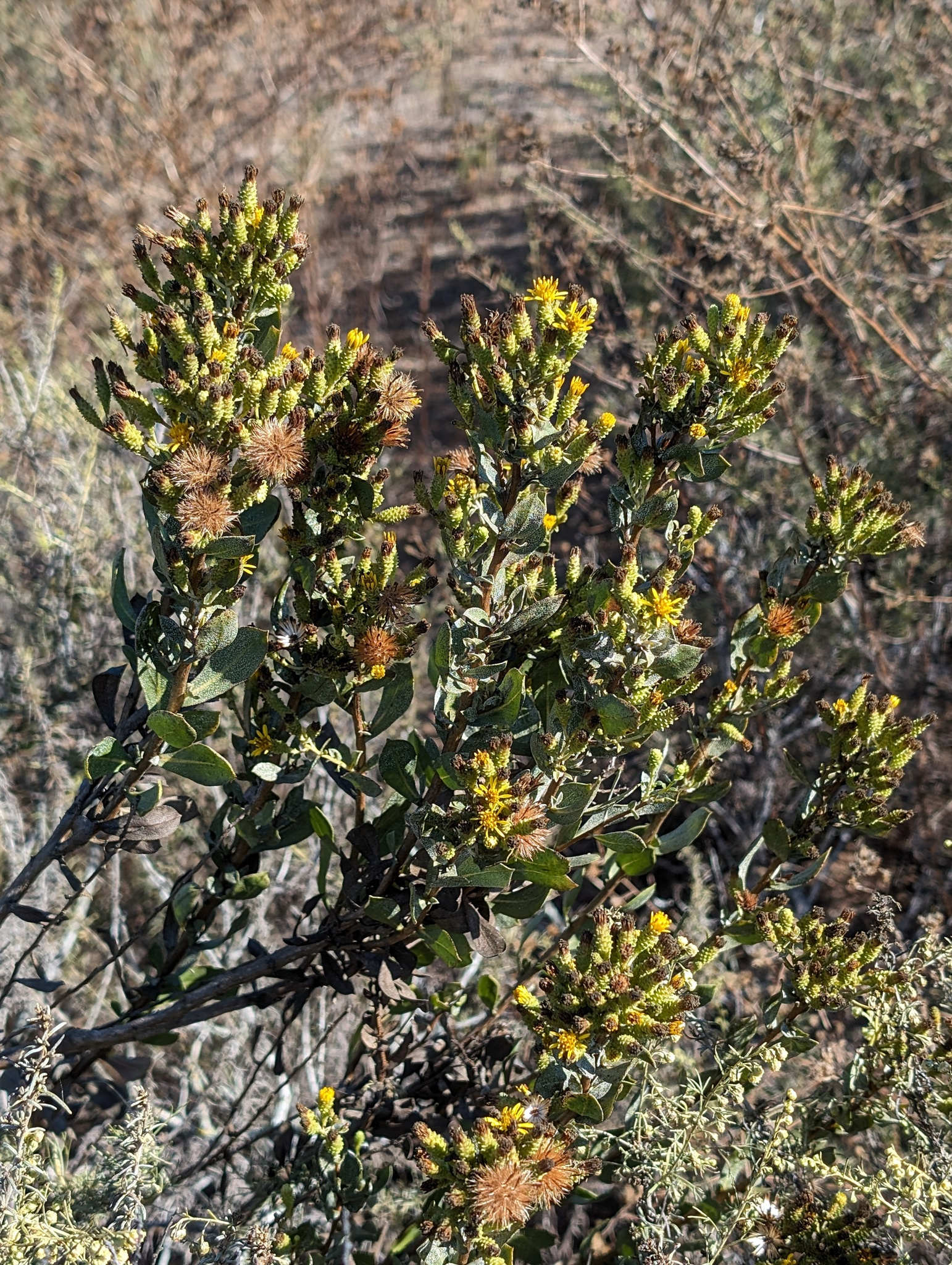

Conservation status
- Critically Imperiled (NatureServe)

Scientific classification
- Kingdom: Plantae
- Clade: Embryophytes
- Clade: Tracheophytes
- Clade: Spermatophytes
- Clade: Angiosperms
- Clade: Eudicots
- Clade: Asterids
- Order: Asterales
- Family: Asteraceae
- Genus: Hazardia
- Species: H. orcuttii

Binomial name
- Hazardia orcuttii (A.Gray) Greene 1894

Synonyms
- Haplopappus orcuttii A.Gray 1885; Aplopappus orcuttii A.Gray 1885

= Hazardia orcuttii =

Species of flowering plant

Hazardia orcuttii is a rare North American species of flowering plant in the family Asteraceae known by the common names Orcutt's bristleweed and Orcutt's goldenbush. It is native to California in the United States and Baja California in Mexico. It can be found in one location in California, in the city of Encinitas. There, it is located in and near a protected zone known as the Manchester Conservation Area. In Baja California it can be found at 11 to 17 locations.

Hazardia orcuttii is a resinous shrub growing up to 100 centimetres (39 in) tall. The leathery, pointed leaves are up to 5 by 1.5 centimetres (0.59 in) in size. The flower head is turbin-shaped and has several ray florets and disc florets surrounded by 40 to 60 resinous phyllaries. The fruit is a few millimeters long and is tipped with a brown pappus about half a centimeter long.

Hazardia orcuttii grows in coastal sage scrub and chaparral habitat on sandstone substrates. It lives approximately 2 miles from the ocean at its California locality. "The California population contains about 600 plants." Another rare plant, Acanthomintha ilicifolia, the San Diego thornmint, can be found nearby. In Baja California it can be found along a coastal strip extending south of the border from Tijuana to Colonet. In 1979 it was described as "locally common" in this region. More recently, the area has undergone development and cattle grazing and there are now fewer populations.

Hazardia orcuttii is a rare species faces a number of threats to its survival. Though the California population is within a protected area, it is not necessarily safe from habitat degradation. There are trails used by hikers and bicyclists, and off-leash dogs have been noted to disturb the habitat. Efforts are underway to prevent damage to the habitat. Plants have been noted to suffer damage from an insect or a fungus, as well; little is known about this factor. Also, the California population is quite vulnerable to wildfire, being located in a fire-adapted ecosystem which has not burned recently. In Mexico, rapid coastal development has altered the local habitat. None of the species' Baja occurrences are protected.
