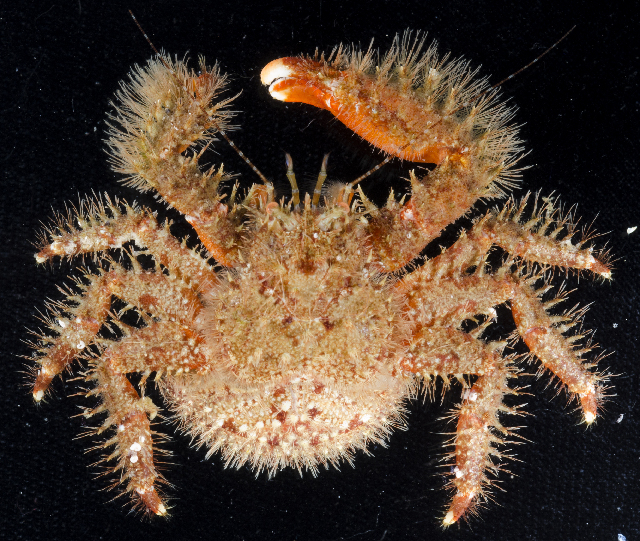

Scientific classification
- Domain: Eukaryota
- Kingdom: Animalia
- Phylum: Arthropoda
- Class: Malacostraca
- Order: Decapoda
- Suborder: Pleocyemata
- Infraorder: Anomura
- Family: Lithodidae
- Genus: Hapalogaster
- Species: H. mertensii

Binomial name
- Hapalogaster mertensii Brandt, 1850

= Hapalogaster mertensii =

Species of king crab

Hapalogaster mertensii is a species of king crab.
