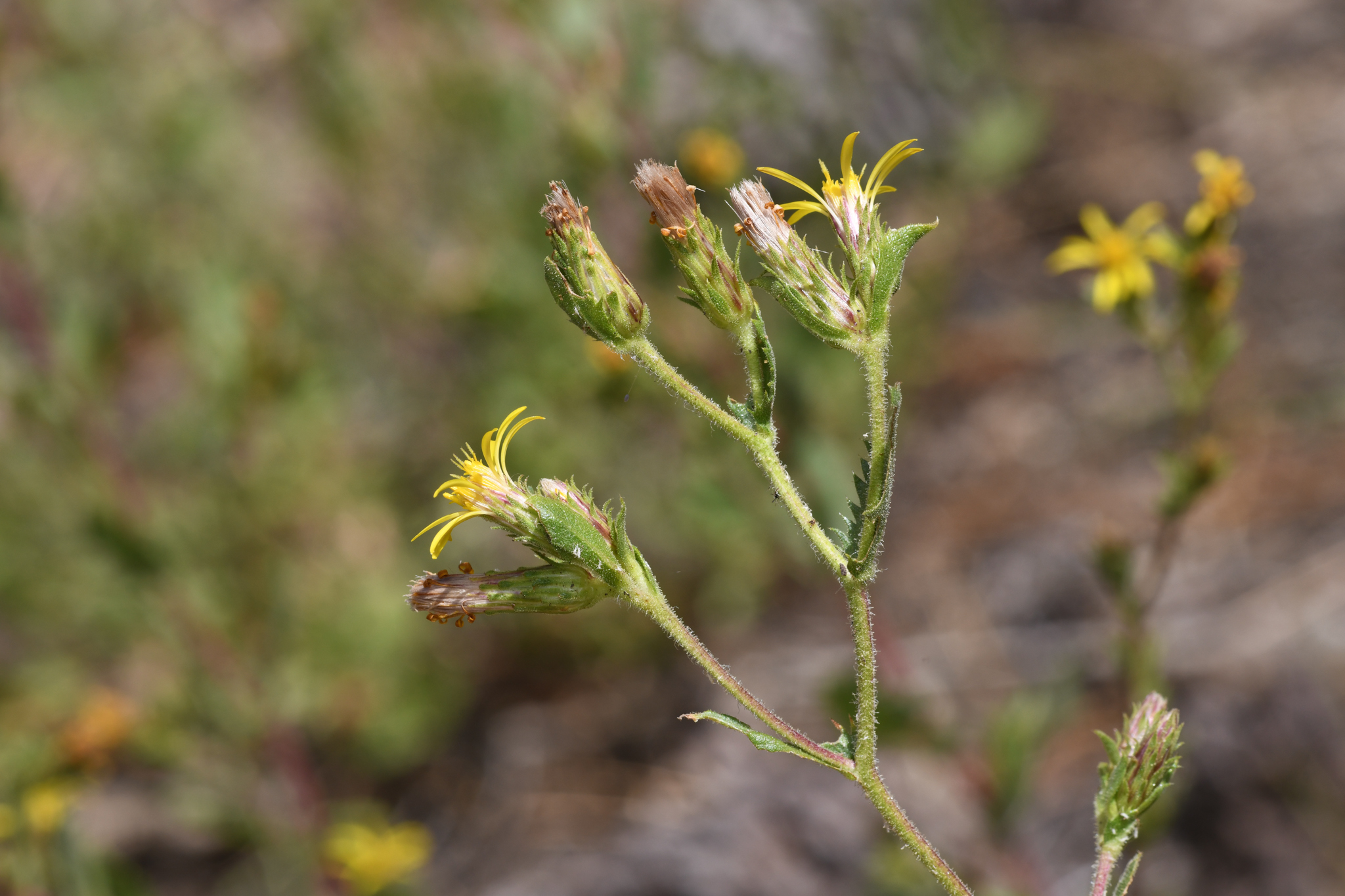

Conservation status
- Apparently Secure (NatureServe)

Scientific classification
- Kingdom: Plantae
- Clade: Tracheophytes
- Clade: Angiosperms
- Clade: Eudicots
- Clade: Asterids
- Order: Asterales
- Family: Asteraceae
- Subfamily: Asteroideae
- Tribe: Astereae
- Subtribe: Machaerantherinae
- Genus: Adeia
- Species: A. whitneyi

Binomial name
- Adeia whitneyi (A.Gray) G.L.Nesom (2021)

Synonyms
- Aster whitneyi (A.Gray) Kuntze (1891); Haplopappus whitneyi A.Gray (1868); Hazardia whitneyi (A.Gray) Greene (1896)

= Adeia whitneyi =

Species of flowering plant

Adeia whitneyi, common name Whitney's bristleweed, is a North American species of shrub in the daisy family. It has been found only in the state of California in the western United States.

Adeia whitneyi is a perennial herb or subshrub up to 50 cm (20 in) tall. The plant produces numerous flower heads in a dense, elongated array at the top of the plant. Each head contains 8-10 disc flowers but no ray flowers. The species sometimes grows on serpentine soils.

The species was first named Haplopappus whitneyi in 1868 by Asa Gray. In 2021 Guy L. Nesom placed the species into the new genus Adeia and elevated its former subspecies discoidea to a distinct species, Adeia discoidea.
