= Isla San Jerónimo =

Mexican island

- Location within Mexico

Geography
- Location: Gulf of California
- Coordinates: 29°47′32.89″N 115°47′28.12″W
- Highest elevation: 21 m (69 ft)

Administration
- Mexico
- State: Baja California

Demographics
- Population: uninhabited

Isla San Jerónimo, is an island in the Pacific Ocean on the west side of the Baja California Peninsula. The island is part of the large Ensenada Municipality and accessed from Punta Baja near the community of El Rosario, Baja California.

== Biology ==
Isla San Jerónimo has three species of reptiles: Anniella geronimensis (Baja California legless lizard), Salvadora hexalepis (western patch-nosed snake), and Uta stansburiana (common side-blotched lizard).
