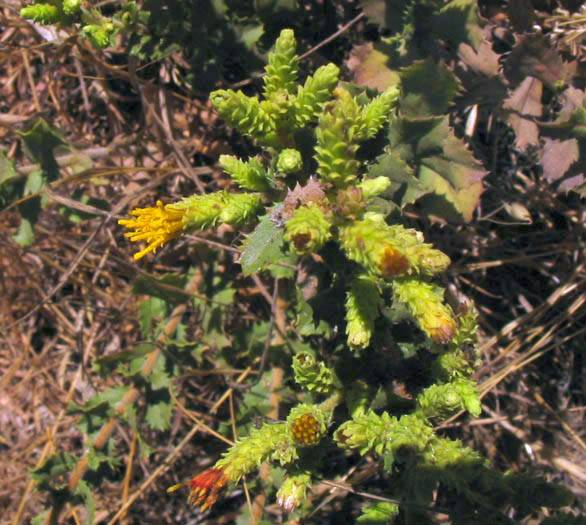

Scientific classification
- Kingdom: Plantae
- Clade: Tracheophytes
- Clade: Angiosperms
- Clade: Eudicots
- Clade: Asterids
- Order: Asterales
- Family: Asteraceae
- Genus: Hazardia
- Species: H. squarrosa

Binomial name
- Hazardia squarrosa (Hook. & Arn.) Greene 1894

Synonyms
- Haplopappus squarrosus Hook. & Arn. 1833; Aplopappus squarrosus Hook. & Arn. 1833; Homopappus squarrosus (Hook. & Arn.) Nutt.; Bigelowia squarrosa (Hook. & Arn.) M.E. Jones; Pyrrocoma grindelioides DC., syn of var. grindelioides; Hazardia obtusa Greene, syn of var. obtusa; Aster grindelioides (DC.) Kuntze, syn of var. grindelioides

= Hazardia squarrosa =

Species of flowering plant

Hazardia squarrosa is a North American species of shrub in the family Asteraceae known by the common name sawtooth goldenbush. It is native to California in the United States and Baja California in Mexico.

Hazardia squarrosa grows in coastal and inland scrub and chaparral habitats. It a shrub of variable size, from low and clumpy to sprawling over 2 metres (6 ft 7 in) tall. It is covered in thick, sharply toothed leaves a few centimeters long and is generally not very hairy or woolly. It bears numerous flower heads covered in greenish, pointed phyllaries and opening into an array of long yellow to slightly reddish disc florets but no ray florets.

Varieties

- Hazardia squarrosa var. grindelioides (DC.) W.D.Clark - from Monterey County to Baja California
- Hazardia squarrosa var. obtusa (Greene) Jeps. - Counties of Santa Barbara, Ventura, Los Angeles, Kern
- Hazardia squarrosa var. squarrosa - from San Benito County to San Diego County
