= El Rosario, Baja California =

- Town
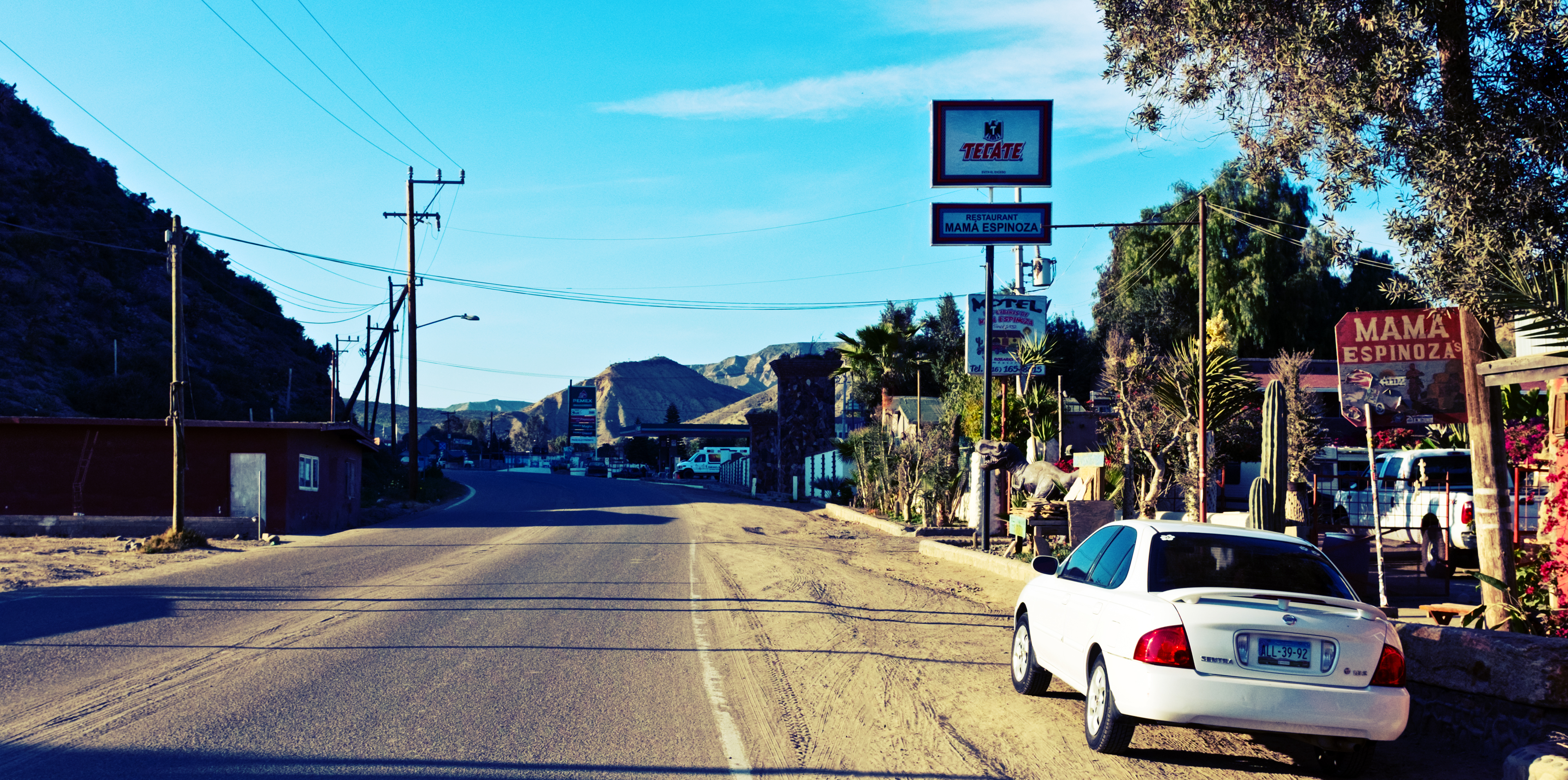
- Highway 1 passing through El Rosario

- Location in Mexico El Rosario (Mexico)
- Coordinates: 30°03′37″N 115°43′37″W
- Country: Mexico
- State: Baja California
- Municipality: San Quintín
- Elevation: 89 ft (27 m)

Population (2010)
  - Total: 1,704
- Time zone: UTC-8 (Northwest US Pacific)
  - Summer (DST): UTC-7 (Northwest)

El Rosario (Spanish for 'The Rosary') is a town in San Quintín Municipality, Baja California, located on the Pacific Coast of Mexico. The census of 2010 reported a population of 1,704 inhabitants.

== Geography ==
El Rosario is a small town on the west coast of the state of Baja California on Highway 1, 61 km south of San Quintín and 119 km north of Cataviña.

== Economy ==
The town historically has been primarily fishing and agricultural, with the major crop being onions. Other local crops include chilies, alfalfa, potatoes, and beans. There are several nearby fishing camps at Punta Baja and Isla San Jerónimo. Bocana Beach (Spanish: La Bocana) is located approximately five miles west of El Rosario through the arroyo and over the dunes.

=== Tourism ===
The town is located on Mexican Federal Highway 1 and also a stop on the Baja 1000 racing event. There are several markets in El Rosario, ranging from mini-markets and meat markets to traditional markets and liquor stores.

The town is one of many locations in Baja California visited by bird watchers, due to bird migration patterns. The Aplopappus vernicosus is a Mexican species of shrub in the family Asteraceae, that has been found almost exclusively in this town.

Just outside of the town of El Rosario (approximately 13 miles south) is the Las Pintas, a site for petroglyphs which dates back to over 2,000 years ago. There is also a nearby petrified forest.

== Missions ==
- Misión de El Rosario de Arriba
- Misión Nuestra Señora del Santísimo Rosario de Viñadaco
- Misión de El Rosario de Abajo, now in ruins.
