= Paw Paw Formation =

Geological formation in Texas

- Stratigraphic range: Late Albian; ~105–100 Ma
- Type: Geological formation
- Unit of: Comanche & Washita Groups

Lithology
- Primary: Mudstone

Location
- Coordinates: 32.9°N 97.3°W
- Approximate paleocoordinates: 30.2°N 59.8°W
- Region: Texas
- Country: United States
- Paw Paw Formation (the United States) Paw Paw Formation (Texas)

The Paw Paw Formation is a geological formation in Texas whose strata date back to the late Albian stage of the Early Cretaceous. Dinosaur remains are among the fossils that have been recovered from the formation.

== Fossil content ==
Color key: Taxon / Reclassified taxon / Taxon falsely reported as present / Dubious taxon or junior synonym / Ichnotaxon / Ootaxon / Morphotaxon	Notes; Uncertain or tentative taxa are in small text; ~~crossed out~~ taxa are discredited.

=== Reptiles ===
==== Dinosaurs ====
Dinosaurs reported from the Paw Paw Formation
Genus	Species	Presence	Material	Notes	Images
Nodosauridae indet.	Indeterminate	Tarrant County, Texas	Humerus, ilia, scapulocoracoid and specimen representing a baby	Juvenile nodosaurid remains that cannot be compared with Pawpawsaurus due to lack of overlapping elements. Informally referred to as the "Paw Paw Scuteling".	
Pawpawsaurus	P. campbelli	Tarrant County, Texas	Complete skull	A nodosaurid	
Texasetes	T. pleurohalio	Blue Mound	Partial skeleton	A nodosaurid	

==== Pterosaurs ====
Pterosaurs reported from the Paw Paw Formation
Genus	Species	Presence	Material	Notes	Images
Coloborhynchus	C. wadleighi	SMU locality 263	Jaw elements	Species moved to the genus Uktenadactylus	
Tapejarinae indet.	Indeterminate	SMU locality 263	Incomplete right metatarsal	Tapejarid bone with signs of scavenging by fish and sharks	
Uktenadactylus	U. wadleighi	SMU locality 263	Jaw elements	An anhanguerid	

==== Turtles ====
Turtles reported from the Paw Paw Formation
Genus	Species	Presence	Material	Notes	Images
Testudines indet.	Indeterminate	SMU locality 241		Remains of a turtle	

=== Fish ===
==== Bony fish ====
Bony fish reported from the Paw Paw Formation
Genus	Species	Presence	Material	Notes	Images
Allocyclostoma	A. alienus	Juniper Point locality	3 otoliths	A beardfish	
Apateodus	A. sp.	Juniper Point locality	6 otoliths	An aulopiform	
Argentina?	A. texana	Juniper Point locality	49 otoliths	An argentine	
Elopothrissus	E. pawpawensis	Juniper Point locality	139 otoliths	A bonefish	
Genartina	G. princeps	Juniper Point locality	486 otoliths	A fish of uncertain classification	
Ichthyodectiformes indet.	Indeterminate	SMU locality 241		Represents either Saurodon sp. or Saurocephalus sp.	
Ichthyotringa	I.? cuneata	Juniper Point locality	12 otoliths	An aulopiform	
Ichthyotringa	I. sp.	Juniper Point locality	An otolith	An aulopiform	
Paraulopus	P.? wichitae	Juniper Point locality	6 otoliths	An aulopiform	
Pteralbula	P. galtina	Juniper Point locality	7 otoliths	A bonefish	
Teleostei incertae sedis	Indeterminate	Juniper Point locality	3 otoliths	Teleost fish remains	
Texoma	T. cyclogaster	Juniper Point locality	5 otoliths	A beardfish	

==== Cartilaginous fish ====
Cartilaginous fish reported from the Paw Paw Formation
Genus	Species	Presence	Material	Notes	Images
Cretalamna	C. appendiculata	Roanoke; SMU locality 241	Teeth	An otodontid shark	
Cretodus	C. semiplicatus	Roanoke	15 teeth	A mackerel shark	
Cretoxyrhina	C. vraconensis	Northeast Texas	Seven teeth	A mackerel shark	
Leptostyrax	L. macrorhizus	Roanoke; Lake Texoma; SMU locality 241	Nine teeth	A mackerel shark	
Paraisurus	P. compressus	Roanoke; SMU locality 241	Incomplete tooth	A mackerel shark	
Protolamna	P. roanokeensis	Roanoke	Teeth	A mackerel shark	
Pseudohypolophus	P. sp.	SMU locality 241		A ray	
Squalicorax	S. aff. S. baharijensis		A tooth	An anacoracid shark	
Squalicorax	S. pawpawensis		Teeth	An anacoracid shark	
Squalicorax	S. priscoserratus		Teeth	An anacoracid shark	
Squalicorax	S. volgensis	Roanoke	Teeth	Material reassigned to S. pawpawensis	
Squalicorax	S. sp.		Teeth	Material reassigned to S. pawpawensis	

=== Invertebrates ===
==== Arthropods ====
Arthropods reported from the Paw Paw Formation
Genus	Species	Presence	Material	Notes	Images
Acanthaxius	A. carinatus	Near Fort Worth	Several specimens	An axiid	
Angulotergum	A. milviformis	Salvation Army locality	Numerous specimens	A barnacle	
Axiopsis	A. pawpawensis	Near Fort Worth	One specimen	An axiid	
Axiopsis	A. sampsonumae	Near Fort Worth	One specimen	An axiid	
Axiopsis	A. spinifera	Near Fort Worth	One specimen	An axiid	
Cenomanocarcinus	C. vanstraeleni	Tarrant County	Several specimens	A cenomanocarcinid crab	
Cretacoranina	C. punctata	Fort Worth; Haltom City	Approximately 260 specimens	A frog crab	
Dawsonius	D. tigris	Near Fort Worth	Several specimens	A ctenochelid	
Diotascalpellum	D. acies	Salvation Army locality	Multiple specimens	A barnacle	
Feldmannia	F. wintoni	SMU locality 241; Haltom City; Between Haltom City & Hurst; Benbrook	Numerous specimens	An etyiid crab originally named as Xanthosia wintoni	
Galathea	G. cretacea	Watauga	One specimen	A squat lobster	
Galathea	G.? limonitica	South of Fort Worth	One specimen	A squat lobster	
Ivolepas	I. worthensis	Salvation Army locality	Multiple specimens	A barnacle	
Linuparus	L. adkinsi	SMU locality 241		A spiny lobster	
Marylyreidus	M. punctatus	Tarrant County	3 specimens	A lyreidid crab	
Meticonaxius	M. rhacheochir	Near Fort Worth	One specimen	A micheleid	
Nephrops	N. americanus	Fort Worth	Numerous specimens	A lobster	
Nodosculda	N. fisherorum	Near Fort Worth	Several specimens	A mantis shrimp	
Paraxiopsis	P. erugatus	Near Fort Worth	Several specimens	An axiid	
Paraxiopsis	P. texensis	Near Fort Worth	Several specimens	An axiid	
Raninella	R. sp.	SMU locality 241		A frog crab	
Xanthosia	X. aspera	SMU locality 241; Fort Worth; Benbrook	Several specimens	An etyiid crab	
Xanthosia	X. pawpawensis	Haltom City; Between Haltom City & Hurst; Hurst; Benbrook	36 specimens	An etyiid crab	
Xanthosia	X. reidi	Keller; Haltom City	10 carapaces	An etyiid crab	
Xanthosia	X. wintoni	SMU locality 241; Haltom City; Between Haltom City & Hurst; Benbrook	Numerous specimens	Moved to the genus Feldmannia	

==== Bivalves ====
Bivalves reported from the Paw Paw Formation
Genus	Species	Presence	Material	Notes	Images
Lima	L. sp.	SMU locality 241		A limid	
Lopha	L. quadriplicata	SMU locality 241		An ostreid	
Neithea	N. sp.	SMU locality 241		A neitheid	
Stearnsia	S. robbinsi	SMU locality 241		A crassatellid	
Texigryphaea	T. washitaensis	SMU locality 241		A gryphaeid	
Trigonia	T. clavigera?	SMU locality 241		A trigoniid	

==== Cephalopods ====
Cephalopods reported from the Paw Paw Formation
Genus	Species	Presence	Material	Notes	Images
Anisoceras	A. armatum		5 fragments	An ammonite	
Cantabrigites	C. spinosum		Multiple specimens	An ammonite	
Cantabrigites	C. wenoensis		Multiple specimens	An ammonite	
Conlinites	C. wrighti	Northeast of Watagua; West of Roanoke	Several hundred specimens	An ammonite	
Engonoceras	E. serpentinum	Near Denison	Multiple specimens	An ammonite	
Engonoceras	E. sp.	SMU locality 241		An ammonite	
Enigmaticeras	E. riceae	Northeast of Watagua; East of Watagua; Near Haslet	12 specimens	An ammonite	
Ficheuria	F. americana	East of Watagua	One specimen	An ammonite	
Ficheuria	F. pernoni		One specimen	An ammonite	
Flickia	F. simplex	South of Rio Vista	One specimen	An ammonite	
Hamites	H. venetzianus	Keller	7 fragments	An ammonite	
Lechites	L. (Lechites) comanchensis		Multiple specimens	An ammonite	
Mariella	M. (Mariella) asper	Fort Worth; South of Rio Vista	Multiple specimens	An ammonite	
Mariella	M. (Mariella) worthensis	Fort Worth; Southwest of Haslet	Multiple specimens	An ammonite	
Mortoniceras	M. (Subschloenbachia) rostratum	South of Rio Vista	Internal mould	An ammonite	
Neophlycticeras	N. (Neophlycticeras) sp.		A single shell	An ammonite	
Neophlycticeras	N. (Paradolphia) occidentalis	East of Watagua	A single shell	An ammonite	
Scaphites	S. hilli	Fort Worth	Multiple specimens	An ammonite	
Stoliczkaia	S. (Lamnayella) worthense	Fort Worth	Several hundred specimens	An ammonite	
Stoliczkaia	S. (Shumarinaia) asiatica		2 specimens	An ammonite	
Stoliczkaia	S. (Stoliczkaia) clavigera		Fragments of phragmocone	An ammonite	
Tetragonites	T. sp.	Northeast of Watagua	Internal mould	An ammonite	
Worthoceras	W. worthense		Multiple specimens	An ammonite	

==== Echinoderms ====
Echinoderms reported from the Paw Paw Formation
Genus	Species	Presence	Material	Notes	Images
Alkaidia	A. sumralli	Fort Worth; Benbrook	36 fragments	A starfish	
Altairia	A. wintoni	Fort Worth	6 specimens	A starfish	
Asteroidea indet.	Indeterminate	SMU locality 241		A starfish	
Betelgeusia	B. reidi	Keller; Haltom City; Fort Worth; Benbrook; Hurst	Hundreds of specimens	A starfish	
Capellia	C. mauricei	Fort Worth	Several specimens	A starfish	
Crateraster	C. texensis	Fort Worth; Benbrook	Over 30 specimens	A starfish	
Denebia	D. americana	Fort Worth; Benbrook	Numerous specimens	A starfish	
Discocrinus	D. catastomus		Multiple specimens	A crinoid	
Echinoidea indet.	Indeterminate	SMU locality 241		A sea urchin	
Fomalhuatia	F. hortensae	Fort Worth; Benbrook	Numerous specimens	A starfish	
Goniasteridae indet.	Unknown	Fort Worth	3 marginal ossicles	A starfish	
Poecilocrinus	P. dispandus	SMU locality 241		A crinoid	
Poecilocrinus	P. dispandus forma discus		Few specimens	A crinoid	
Poecilocrinus	P. dispandus forma floriformis		Multiple specimens	A crinoid	
Roveacrinus	R. morganae	Fort Worth	One specimen	A crinoid	
Roveacrinus	R. proteus	Fort Worth	32 cups	A crinoid	

==== Gastropods ====
Gastropods reported from the Paw Paw Formation
Genus	Species	Presence	Material	Notes	Images
Turritella	T. sp.	SMU locality 241		A turritellid	

== See also ==
- List of dinosaur-bearing rock formations
