= Mud shrimp =

The term mud shrimp is used for a number of different mud-dwelling crustaceans:

- The former infraorder Thalassinidea, which included genera such as Callianassa, Pestarella and Upogebia
  - Infraorder Axiidea, comprising part of the former infraorder Thalassinidea
  - Infraorder Gebiidea, comprising part of the former infraorder Thalassinidea
- Corophium volutator, an amphipod of the North Atlantic
- Species of Solenocera, a genus of prawns
