= Callianassa (disambiguation) =

Callianassa can refer to:

- Callianassa, one of the Nereids
- Callianassa (genus), a genus of mud-shrimp including
  - C. filholi
  - C. subterranea
  - C. tyrrhena (now known as Pestarella tyrrhena)
