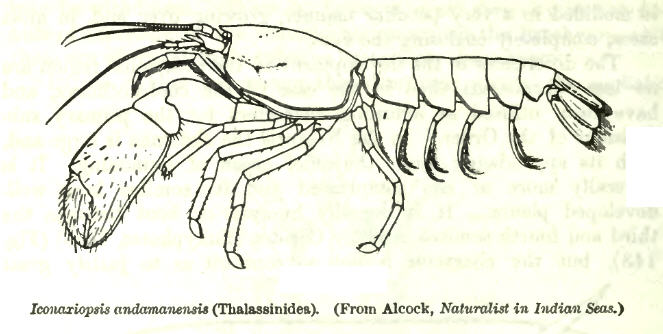

Scientific classification
- Kingdom: Animalia
- Phylum: Arthropoda
- Clade: Pancrustacea
- Class: Malacostraca
- Order: Decapoda
- Suborder: Pleocyemata
- Family: Axiidae
- Genus: Eiconaxius
- Species: E. andamanensis

Binomial name
- Eiconaxius andamanensis (Alcock, 1901)

Synonyms
- Iconaxiopsis andamanensis Alcock, 1901

= Eiconaxius andamanensis =

Species of crustacean

Eiconaxius andamanensis is a species in the family Axiidae. Although it is not a true lobster, is sometimes known by the common names "mud lobster" and "scorpion lobster". Its scientific name comes from the Andaman Sea, where it has been collected off the west coast of Andaman Islands at a depth of 238–290 fathoms (1,428–1,740 ft; 435–530 m).

Although very similar to Iconasioptis laccadivensis, a species which shelters itself in the branches of deep sea zoophytes, the exact habits of Eiconaxius andamanensis are unknown.
