= Ctenocheloides attenboroughi =

Scientific classification
- Domain: Eukaryota
- Kingdom: Animalia
- Phylum: Arthropoda
- Class: Malacostraca
- Order: Decapoda
- Suborder: Pleocyemata
- Family: Ctenochelidae
- Genus: Ctenocheloides
- Species: C. attenboroughi

Binomial name
- Ctenocheloides attenboroughi Anker, 2010

Species of ghost shrimp

Ctenocheloides attenboroughi is a species of ghost shrimp in the family Ctenochelidae. It was described in 2010 and named in honour of the British natural history broadcaster Sir David Attenborough. It is known from a single female specimen collected in shallow water on the north-western coast of Madagascar. The total length of the specimen is 19.8 millimetres (0.78 in), with a carapace 4.15 mm (0.163 in) long.

== Distribution ==
The single known specimen of Ctenocheloides was collected in 2008 from a "large, mud-cemented piece of rubble", dredged from a bay near Hell-Ville, Nosy Bé, in north-western Madagascar. The piece of rubble was lying at a depth of 1.5 metres (4 ft 11 in) in a bay filled with mangroves.

== See also ==
- List of things named after David Attenborough and his works
