= Guyanacaris caespitosa =

Scientific classification
- Domain: Eukaryota
- Kingdom: Animalia
- Phylum: Arthropoda
- Class: Malacostraca
- Order: Decapoda
- Suborder: Pleocyemata
- Family: Axiidae
- Genus: Guyanacaris
- Species: G. caespitosa

Binomial name
- Guyanacaris caespitosa Squires, 1979

Species of shrimp

Guyanacaris caespitosa is a species of ghost shrimp found in the eastern Pacific Ocean off the coast of Colombia. It was originally described as being in the genus Axiopsis and later in the genus Acanthaxius. It has been found at a depth of 90 metres (300 ft).
