= Eiconaxius albatrossae =

Scientific classification
- Domain: Eukaryota
- Kingdom: Animalia
- Phylum: Arthropoda
- Class: Malacostraca
- Order: Decapoda
- Suborder: Pleocyemata
- Family: Axiidae
- Genus: Eiconaxius
- Species: E. albatrossae

Binomial name
- Eiconaxius albatrossae Kensley, 1996

Species of crustacean

Eiconaxius albatrossae is a species of mud shrimp from the Pacific Ocean.
