= Eiconaxius cristagalli =

Scientific classification
- Domain: Eukaryota
- Kingdom: Animalia
- Phylum: Arthropoda
- Class: Malacostraca
- Order: Decapoda
- Suborder: Pleocyemata
- Family: Axiidae
- Genus: Eiconaxius
- Species: E. cristagalli

Binomial name
- Eiconaxius cristagalli (Faxon, 1893)

Species of crustacean

Eiconaxius cristagalli is a species of mud lobster from the Pacific Ocean.
