= Guyanacaris hirsutimana =

Scientific classification
- Domain: Eukaryota
- Kingdom: Animalia
- Phylum: Arthropoda
- Class: Malacostraca
- Order: Decapoda
- Suborder: Pleocyemata
- Family: Axiidae
- Genus: Guyanacaris
- Species: G. hirsutimana

Binomial name
- Guyanacaris hirsutimana Boesch & Smalley, 1972

Species of shrimp

Guyanacaris hirsutimana is a species of ghost shrimp found in the Atlantic Ocean off the coast of Guyana. It was originally described as being in the genus Calocaris, later in Acanthaxius, and finally in Axiopsis before being placed in Guyanacaris. It has been found at a depth of 50 metres (160 ft).
