= Estero de San Antonio State Marine Recreational Management Area =

Protected area in California, United States

Coordinates: 38.2701°N 122.9781°W

Estero de San Antonio State Marine Recreational Management Area (SMRMA) is a marine protected area 1.5 miles north of Dillon Beach in Marin County on California’s north-central coast. The marine protected area covers 0.09 square miles. Estero de San Antonio SMRMA prohibits taking all living marine resources, except the recreational hunting of waterfowl, unless otherwise restricted by hunting regulations.

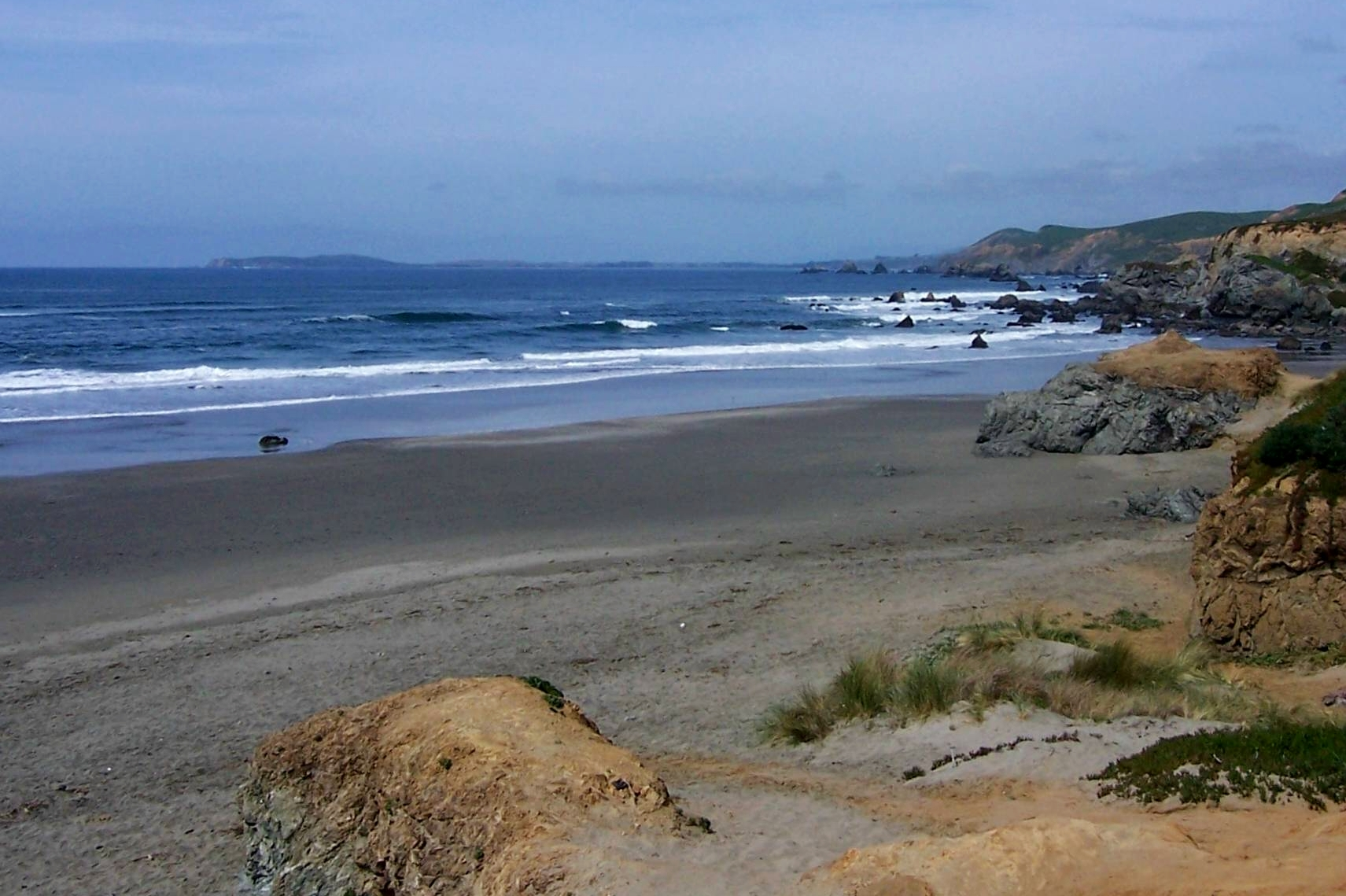
Bodega Bay from Dillon Beach

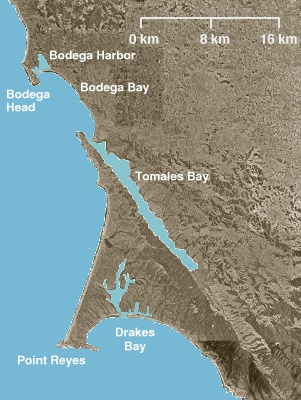

== History ==
Estero de San Antonio SMRMA is one of 22 marine protected areas adopted by the California Department of Fish and Game in August 2009, during the second phase of the Marine Life Protection Act Initiative. The MLPAI is a collaborative public process that creates a statewide network of protected areas along California’s coastline.

Local divers, fishermen, conservationists, and scientists who comprised the North Central Coast Regional Stakeholder Group designed the north-central coast's new marine protected area. Their job was to design a network of protected areas that would preserve sensitive sea life and habitats while enhancing recreation, study, and education opportunities.

The north-central coast marine protected areas took effect on May 1, 2010.

== Geography and natural features ==
Estero de San Antonio SMRMA is a marine protected area 1.5 miles north of Dillon Beach in Marin County on California’s north-central coast. The Estero springs north of the Marin-Sonoma county line and meanders south and west until Bodega Bay empties.

Estero de San Antonio SMRMA includes the waters below the mean high tide line within Estero de San Antonio westward of longitude 122° 57.40' W.

== Habitat and wildlife ==
The Estero de San Antonio has various habitat types, including freshwater ponds, mudflats, eelgrass, saltgrass areas, and wooded ravines, including 923 acres of associated wetlands. Tidewater goby, Ghost shrimp, and Mud shrimp, as well as significant seabird aggregations and other species depend upon this habitat. In the summer or early fall, a sandbar often forms at the mouth of the Estero, damming it until the winter rains arrive.

== Recreation and nearby attractions ==
Doran Regional Park, one mile south of Bodega Bay, provides a boat launch and campgrounds, while Salmon Creek Beach to the north is the most popular surf spot in Sonoma County.

Estero de San Antonio SMRMA prohibits the taking of living marine resources, except the recreational hunting of waterfowl, unless otherwise restricted by hunting regulations. However, California’s marine protected areas encourage recreational and educational uses of the ocean. Activities such as kayaking, diving, snorkeling, and swimming are allowed unless otherwise restricted.

== Scientific monitoring ==
As specified by the Marine Life Protection Act, select marine protected areas along California’s central coast are being monitored by scientists to track their effectiveness and learn more about ocean health. Similar studies in marine protected areas of the Santa Barbara Channel Islands have already detected gradual improvements in fish size and number.
