= Ctenocheloides =

Scientific classification
- Kingdom: Animalia
- Phylum: Arthropoda
- Class: Malacostraca
- Order: Decapoda
- Suborder: Pleocyemata
- Family: Ctenochelidae
- Genus: Ctenocheloides; Anker, 2010

Genus of crustaceans

Ctenocheloides is a genus of ghost shrimp in the family Ctenochelidae. Its first species, C. attenboroughi, was described in 2010 and named in honour of the British natural history broadcaster Sir David Attenborough.

It contains the following species:

- Ctenocheloides almeidai Anker & Pachelle, 2013
- Ctenocheloides attenboroughi Anker, 2010
- Ctenocheloides boucheti Poore, 2015

== Description ==
Ctenocheloides resembles the genus Ctenocheles, as reflected in the name of the genus, both genera having pectinate (comb-like) fingers to the chelae (claws). Ctenocheloides differs from Ctenocheles in having no rostrum, having well-developed eyes, and in having shorter, fatter claws.

== Taxonomy ==
The genus Ctenocheloides and its first species, C. attenboroughi, were described in 2010 by Arthur Anker, in a paper in the Journal of Natural History. The genus name reflects the close relationship of the genus to Ctenocheles, while the specific epithet "attenboroughi" commemorates the British natural history broadcaster David Attenborough. It was originally placed in the family Ctenochelidae, which was later reduced to a subfamily of a broader Callianassidae.
