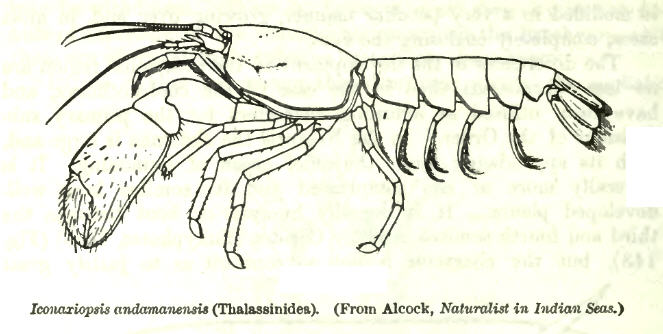
- Eiconaxius andamanensis

Scientific classification
- Domain: Eukaryota
- Kingdom: Animalia
- Phylum: Arthropoda
- Class: Malacostraca
- Order: Decapoda
- Suborder: Pleocyemata
- Family: Axiidae
- Genus: Eiconaxius; Bate, 1888

Type species
- Eiconaxius acutifrons Bate, 1888

= Eiconaxius =

Genus of crustaceans

Eiconaxius is a genus of mud lobster that includes the following species:

- Eiconaxius acutifrons Spence Bate, 1888
- Eiconaxius agassizi Bouvier, 1905
- Eiconaxius albatrossae Kensley, 1996
- Eiconaxius andamanensis (Alcock, 1901)
- Eiconaxius antillensis Bouvier, 1905
- Eiconaxius asper Rathbun, 1906
- Eiconaxius baja Kensley, 1996
- Eiconaxius borradailei Bouvier, 1905
- Eiconaxius budibudi Poore, 2020
- Eiconaxius caribbaeus (Faxon, 1896)
- Eiconaxius consobrinus (De Man, 1907)
- Eiconaxius cristagalli (Faxon, 1893)
- Eiconaxius demani Sakai, 1992
- Eiconaxius dongshaensis Poore & Dworschak, 2018
- Eiconaxius ebisco Poore, 2020
- Eiconaxius farreae Ortmann, 1891
- Eiconaxius gololobovi Poore & Dworschak, 2018
- Eiconaxius hakuhou Sakai & Ohta, 2005
- Eiconaxius heinrichi (Sakai, 2011)
- Eiconaxius indicus (De Man, 1907)
- Eiconaxius johannesi Poore, 2020
- Eiconaxius kensleyi Komai, Lin & Chan, 2010
- Eiconaxius kermadeci Spence Bate, 1888
- Eiconaxius kimbla Kensley, 1996
- Eiconaxius kumejimaensis Sakai, 2014
- Eiconaxius laccadivensis Alcock & Anderson, 1894
- Eiconaxius malaku Poore, 2017
- Eiconaxius mallacoota Poore & Collins, 2009
- Eiconaxius mortenseni Sakai, 1992
- Eiconaxius parvus Spence Bate, 1888
- Eiconaxius reconditus Komai, 2024
- Eiconaxius rubrirostris Komai, Lin & Chan, 2010
- Eiconaxius serratus Kou, Xu, Poore, Li & Wang, 2020
- Eiconaxius sibogae (De Man, 1925)
- Eiconaxius singularis (Zarenkov in Zarenkov & Khodkina, 1983)
- Eiconaxius spiniger (MacGilchrist, 1905)
- Eiconaxius vaubani Poore, 2017
- Eiconaxius weberi (De Man, 1907)
