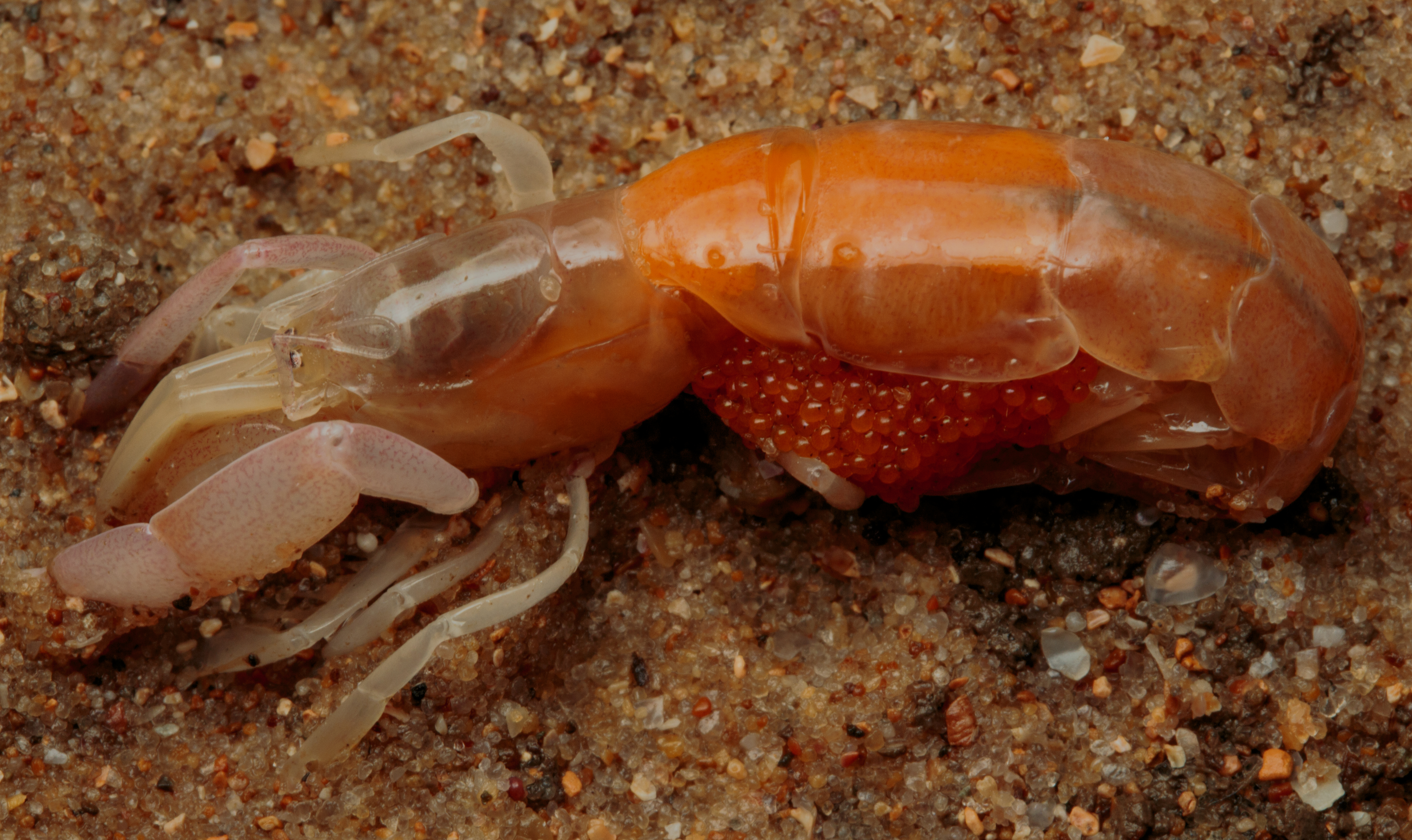
- Trypaea australiensis

Scientific classification
- Domain: Eukaryota
- Kingdom: Animalia
- Phylum: Arthropoda
- Class: Malacostraca
- Order: Decapoda
- Suborder: Pleocyemata
- Family: Callianassidae
- Subfamily: Callianassinae
- Genus: Trypaea; Dana, 1852
- Species: T. australiensis

Binomial name
- Trypaea australiensis Dana, 1852

= Trypaea =

Trypaea australiensis

Genus of crustaceans

Trypaea australiensis, known as the (marine) yabby or ghost nipper in Australia, or as the one-arm bandit due to their occasional abnormally large arm, and as the Australian ghost shrimp elsewhere, is a common species of mud shrimp in south-eastern Australia, and may be the only extant species in the genus Trypaea. T. australiensis is a popular bait used live or frozen by Australians targeting a range of species. It grows to a length of 6 centimetres (2.4 in) and lives in burrows in mudflats or sandbanks, especially in or near estuaries.

== Species ==
One extant and two extinct species belong to the genus Trypaea:

- Trypaea australiensis Dana, 1852 (Australian ghost shrimp) (Indo-West Pacific and Australia)
- † Trypaea inornata (Nagao & Huzioka, 1938)
- † Trypaea mizunamiensis Karasawa, 1993 (temperate Asia)
