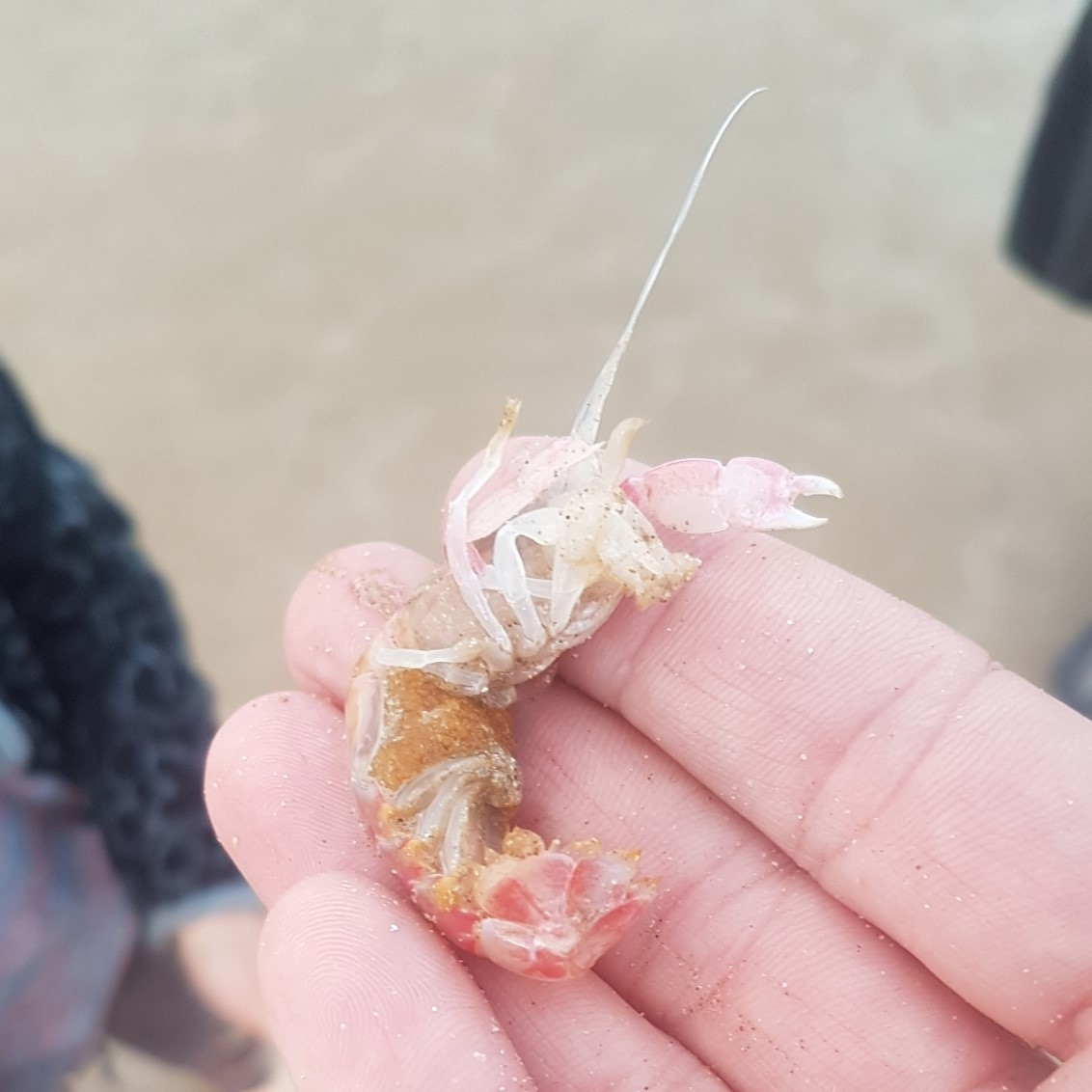

Scientific classification
- Kingdom: Animalia
- Phylum: Arthropoda
- Clade: Pancrustacea
- Class: Malacostraca
- Order: Decapoda
- Suborder: Pleocyemata
- Family: Callianassidae
- Genus: Biffarius; Manning & Felder, 1991

= Biffarius =

Genus of crustaceans

Biffarius is a genus of ghost shrimp in the family Callianassidae, containing species formerly included in the genus Callianassa. Its members are small and generally live in the intertidal zone. In April 2020, a new species was described from the northeastern Brazilian coast. Biffarius was named in honour of Thomas A. Biffar, and includes the following species:

- Biffarius biformis (Biffar, 1971)
- Biffarius botterae (Hernáez, Miranda & Tavares, 2020)
- Biffarius delicatulus Rodrigues & Manning, 1992
- Biffarius limosus (Poore, 1975)
