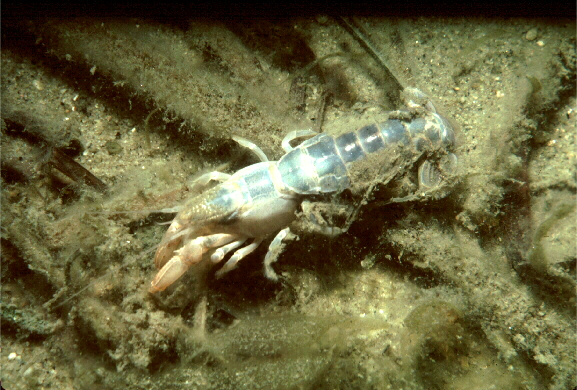
- Axius serratus

Scientific classification
- Domain: Eukaryota
- Kingdom: Animalia
- Phylum: Arthropoda
- Class: Malacostraca
- Order: Decapoda
- Suborder: Pleocyemata
- Family: Axiidae
- Genus: Axius; Leach, 1815

Type species
- Axius stirynchus Leach, 1815

= Axius (crustacean) =

Genus of crustaceans

Axius is a genus of mud lobster containing the following species:

- Axius armatus S. I. Smith, 1881
- †Axius hofstedtae Hyžný, Jakobsen & Fraaije, 2017
- †Axius lineadactylus (Fraaije, Van Bakel, Jagt & Mollen, 2011)
- †Axius reticulatus Rathbun, 1918
- Axius serratus Stimpson, 1852
- Axius stirynchus Leach, 1815
- †Axius texensis (Franţescu, 2014)
