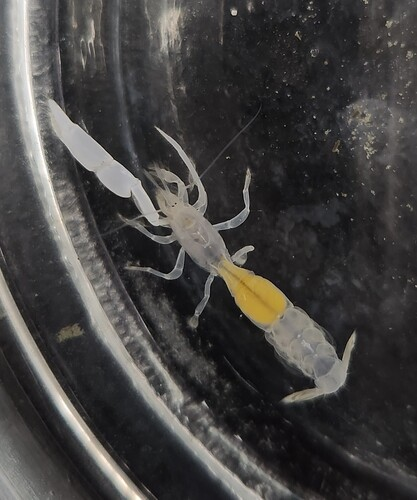

Scientific classification
- Kingdom: Animalia
- Phylum: Arthropoda
- Clade: Pancrustacea
- Class: Malacostraca
- Order: Decapoda
- Suborder: Pleocyemata
- Family: Callianassidae
- Genus: Fragillianassa; Poore, Dworschak, Robles, Mantelatto & Felder, 2019

= Fragillianassa =

Genus of crustaceans

Fragillianassa is a genus of ghost shrimp crustaceans belonging to the infraorder Axiidea, within the order Decapoda.

== Species ==
There are 3 species assigned to this genus of mud shrimp.

- Fragillianassa debilis (Hernández-Aguilera, 1998)
- Fragillianassa fragilis (Biffar, 1970)
- Fragillianassa joeli (Pachelle & Tavares, 2020)
