= Callianassa =

Callianassa Temporal range: 183.0–0 Ma

Scientific classification
- Kingdom: Animalia
- Phylum: Arthropoda
- Clade: Pancrustacea
- Class: Malacostraca
- Order: Decapoda
- Suborder: Pleocyemata
- Family: Callianassidae
- Subfamily: Callianassinae
- Genus: Callianassa; Leach, 1814

Type species
- Cancer (Astacus) subterraneus Montagu, 1808

Synonyms
- Montagua Leach, 1814

Genus of crustaceans

Callianassa is a genus of mud shrimps, in the family Callianassidae. Three of the species in this genus (C. candida, C. tyrrhena and C. whitei) have been split off into a new genus, Pestarella, while others such as Callianassa filholi have been moved to Biffarius. The genus is named after the Nereid of the Greco-Roman mythology.

== Species ==
Six species are currently recognised in the genus Callianassa:

- Callianassa australis Kensley, 1974
- Callianassa diaphora Le Loeuff & Intes, 1974
- Callianassa marchali Le Loeuff & Intes, 1974
- Callianassa ogurai Henmi, Itani, Osawa & Komai, 2022
- Callianassa subterranea (Montagu, 1808)
- Callianassa timiris (Sakai, Türkay, Beuck & Freiwald, 2015)

Incertae sedis

- Callianassa? anoploura Sakai, 2002
- Callianassa? chakratongae Sakai, 2002
- Callianassa? exilimaxilla Sakai, 2005
- Callianassa? gruneri Sakai, 1999
- Callianassa? nigroculata Sakai, 2002
- Callianassa? plantei Sakai, 2004
- Callianassa? stenomastaxa Sakai, 2002
- Callianassa? propriopedis Sakai, 2002
- Callianassa? tenuipes Sakai, 2002

Synonyms

- Callianassa acanthochirus (Stimpson, 1866) accepted as Glypturus acanthochirus (Stimpson, 1866)
- Callianassa acanthura Caroli, 1946 accepted as Necallianassa acanthura (Caroli, 1946)
- Callianassa acutirostella Sakai, 1988 accepted as Spinicallianassa acutirostella (Sakai, 1988)
- Callianassa adamas Kensley, 1974 accepted as Callichirus adamas (Kensley, 1974)
- Callianassa aequimana Baker, 1907 accepted as Eucalliaxiopsis aequimana (Baker, 1907)
- Callianassa affinis Holmes, 1900 accepted as Neotrypaea biffari (Holthuis, 1991)
- Callianassa agassizi Biffar, 1971 accepted as Anacalliax agassizi (Biffar, 1971)
- Callianassa algerica Lutze, 1938 accepted as Gilvossius candidus (Olivi, 1792)
- Callianassa amboinae (Bate, 1888) accepted as Scallasis amboinae Bate, 1888
- Callianassa amboinensis De Man, 1888 accepted as Rayllianassa amboinensis (De Man, 1888)
- Callianassa amplimaxilla Sakai, 2002 accepted as Aqaballianassa amplimaxilla (Sakai, 2002)
- Callianassa aqabaensis Dworschak, 2003 accepted as Aqaballianassa aqabaensis (Dworschak, 2003)
- Callianassa arenosa Poore, 1975 accepted as Arenallianassa arenosa (Poore, 1975)
- Callianassa argentinensis Biffar, 1971 accepted as Anacalliax argentinensis (Biffar, 1971)
- Callianassa armata A. Milne-Edwards, 1870 accepted as Glypturus armatus (A. Milne-Edwards, 1870)
- Callianassa articulata Rathbun, 1906 accepted as Articullichirus articulatus (Rathbun, 1906)
- Callianassa assimilis De Man, 1928 accepted as Corallianassa assimilis (De Man, 1928)
- Callianassa atlantica Rathbun, 1926 accepted as Gilvossius setimanus (De Kay, 1844)
- Callianassa audax De Man, 1911 accepted as Audacallichirus audax (De Man, 1911)
- Callianassa australiensis (Dana, 1852) accepted as Trypaea australiensis Dana, 1852
- Callianassa balssi Monod, 1933 accepted as Balsscallichirus balssi (Monod, 1933)
- Callianassa bangensis (Sakai, 2005) accepted as Rayllianassa bangensis (Sakai, 2005)
- Callianassa berylae (Heard & Manning, 1998) accepted as Necallianassa berylae Heard & Manning, 1998
- Callianassa biffari Holthuis, 1991 accepted as Neotrypaea biffari (Holthuis, 1991)
- Callianassa biformis Biffar, 1971 accepted as Biffarius biformis (Biffar, 1971)
- Callianassa bocourti A. Milne-Edwards, 1870 accepted as Lepidophthalmus bocourti (A. Milne-Edwards, 1870)
- Callianassa borradailei De Man, 1928 accepted as Corallianassa borradailei (De Man, 1928)
- Callianassa bouvieri Nobili, 1904 accepted as Paratrypaea bouvieri (Nobili, 1904)
- Callianassa brachyophthalma A. Milne-Edwards, 1870 accepted as Notiax brachyophthalma (A. Milne-Edwards, 1870)
- Callianassa brachytelson Sakai, 2002 accepted as Cheramoides brachytelson (Sakai, 2002)
- Callianassa branneri (Rathbun, 1900) accepted as Neocallichirus grandimana (Gibbes, 1850)
- Callianassa brevicaudata A. Milne-Edwards, 1870 accepted as Mucrollichirus mucronatus (Strahl, 1862)
- Callianassa brevirostris Sakai, 2002 accepted as Aqaballianassa brevirostris (Sakai, 2002)
- Callianassa bulimba Poore & Griffin, 1979 accepted as Calliaxina bulimba (Poore & Griffin, 1979)
- Callianassa caecigena Alcock & Anderson, 1894 accepted as Callianopsis caecigena (Alcock & Anderson, 1894)
- Callianassa caesari (Heard & Manning, 2000) accepted as Neotrypaea caesari (Heard & Manning, 2000)
- Callianassa caledonica Ngoc-Ho, 1991 accepted as Scallasis caledonica (Ngoc-Ho, 1991)
- Callianassa californiensis Dana, 1854 accepted as Neotrypaea californiensis (Dana, 1854)
- Callianassa calmani Nobili, 1904 accepted as Neocallichirus calmani (Nobili, 1904)
- Callianassa candida (Olivi, 1792) accepted as Gilvossius candidus (Olivi, 1792)
- Callianassa ceramica Fulton & Grant, 1906 accepted as Filhollianassa ceramica (Fulton & Grant, 1906)
- Callianassa chakratongae Sakai, 2002 incertae sedis as Callianassa? anoploura Sakai, 2002
- Callianassa coecigena Alcock & Anderson, 1894 accepted as Callianopsis caecigena (Alcock & Anderson, 1894)
- Callianassa collaroy Poore & Griffin, 1979 accepted as Articullichirus collaroy (Poore & Griffin, 1979)
- Callianassa contipes Sakai, 2002 accepted as Scallasis contipes (Sakai, 2002)
- Callianassa convexa de Saint Laurent & Le Loeuff, 1979 accepted as Gilvossius convexus (de Saint Laurent & Le Loeuff, 1979)
- Callianassa coriolisae Ngoc-Ho, 2014 accepted as Coriollianassa coriolisae (Ngoc-Ho, 2014)
- Callianassa costaricensis Sakai, 2005 accepted as Neotrypaea costaricensis (Sakai, 2005)
- Callianassa coutierei Nobili, 1904 accepted as Corallianassa coutierei (Nobili, 1904)
- Callianassa cristata Borradaile, 1911 taxon inquirendum as Paratrypaea cristata (Borradaile, 1910)
- Callianassa davyana (Risso, 1822) accepted as Gilvossius candidus (Olivi, 1792)
- Callianassa debilis (Hernández-Aguilera, 1999) accepted as Fragillianassa debilis (Hernández-Aguilera, 1998)
- Callianassa delicatula (de Almeida Rodrigues & Manning, 1992) accepted as Biffarius delicatulus Rodrigues & Manning, 1992
- Callianassa denticulata Lutze, 1937 accepted as Gourretia denticulata (Lutze, 1937)
- Callianassa diademata Ortmann, 1891 accepted as Lepidophthalmus turneranus (White, 1861)
- Callianassa ehsani Sepahvand, Tudge & Momtazi, 2018 accepted as Aqaballianassa ehsani (Sepahvand, Tudge & Momtazi, 2018)
- Callianassa eiseni (Holmes, 1904) accepted as Lepidophthalmus eiseni Holmes, 1904
- Callianassa exilimaxilla Sakai, 2005 incertae sedis as Callianassa? exilimaxilla Sakai, 2005
- Callianassa filholi A. Milne-Edwards, 1879 accepted as Filhollianassa filholi (A. Milne-Edwards, 1879)
- Callianassa fragilis Biffar, 1970 accepted as Fragillianassa fragilis (Biffar, 1970)
- Callianassa garthi Retamal, 1975 accepted as Callichirus garthi (Retamal, 1975)
- Callianassa gaucho (Rodrigues & Manning, 1992) accepted as Poti gaucho Rodrigues & Manning, 1992
- Callianassa gigas Dana, 1852 accepted as Neotrypaea gigas (Dana, 1852)
- Callianassa gilchristi Barnard, 1947 accepted as Balsscallichirus gilchristi (Barnard, 1947)
- Callianassa goniophthalma Rathbun, 1902 accepted as Callianopsis goniophthalma (Rathbun, 1902)
- Callianassa grandidieri Coutière, 1899 accepted as Lepidophthalmus grandidieri (Coutière, 1899)
- Callianassa grandimana Gibbes, 1850 accepted as Neocallichirus grandimana (Gibbes, 1850)
- Callianassa gravieri Nobili, 1906 accepted as Paratrypaea bouvieri (Nobili, 1904)
- Callianassa gruneri Sakai, 1999 incertae sedis as Callianassa? gruneri Sakai, 1999
- Callianassa guara Rodrigues, 1971 accepted as Neocallichirus guara (Rodrigues, 1971)
- Callianassa guassutinga Rodrigues, 1971 accepted as Neocallichirus guassutinga (Rodrigues, 1971)
- Callianassa guineensis De Man, 1928 accepted as Balsscallichirus guineensis (De Man, 1928)
- Callianassa harmandi Bouvier, 1901 accepted as Neotrypaea harmandi (Bouvier, 1901)
- Callianassa hartmeyeri Schmitt, 1935 accepted as Corallianassa hartmeyeri (Schmitt, 1935)
- Callianassa haswelli Poore & Griffin, 1979 accepted as Corallianassa martensi (Miers, 1884)
- Callianassa helgolandica Lutze, 1938 accepted as Callianassa subterranea (Montagu, 1808)

Several species are known from the fossil record, including:

- †Callianassa elegans Bohm 1922 (Java)
- †Callianassa moinensis Rathbun, 1919
