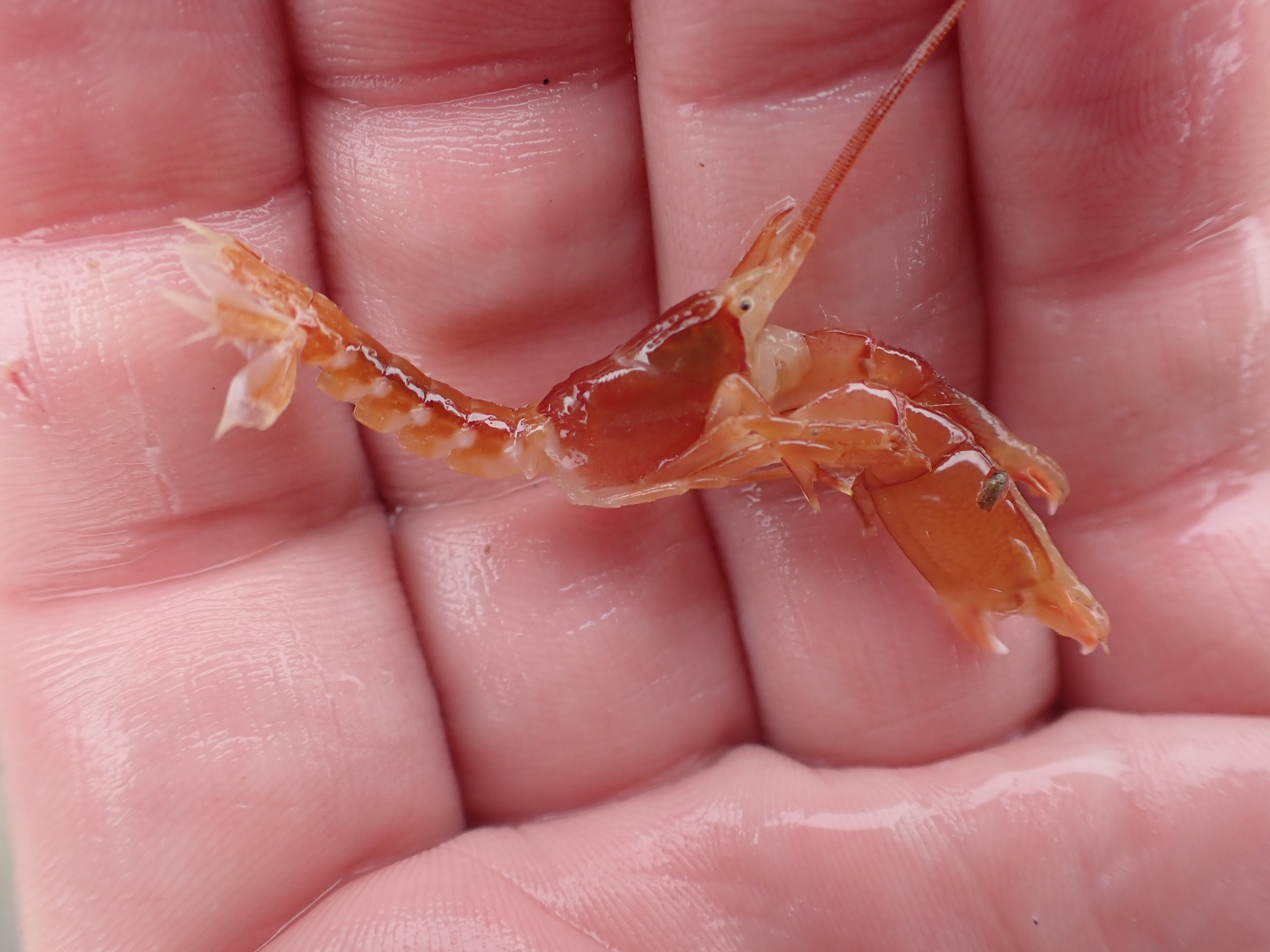
- Dorphinaxius kermadecensis being held

Scientific classification
- Domain: Eukaryota
- Kingdom: Animalia
- Phylum: Arthropoda
- Class: Malacostraca
- Order: Decapoda
- Suborder: Pleocyemata
- Family: Axiidae
- Genus: Dorphinaxius; Sakai & de Saint Laurent, 1989
- Species: D. kermadecensis

Binomial name
- Dorphinaxius kermadecensis (Chilton, 1911)

Synonyms
- Axiopsis appendiculis Poore & Griffin, 1979; Iconaxiopsis kermadecensis Chilton, 1911

= Dorphinaxius =

Genus of crustaceans

Dorphinaxius kermadecensis is a species of mud lobster native to the Norfolk Island, parts of New South Wales, and the Kermadec Islands of New Zealand. It is the only species in the genus Dorphinaxius. It has a depth range of 0–8 metres (0–26 ft).
