= Callianassa subterranea =

Scientific classification
- Kingdom: Animalia
- Phylum: Arthropoda
- Class: Malacostraca
- Order: Decapoda
- Suborder: Pleocyemata
- Family: Callianassidae
- Genus: Callianassa
- Species: C. subterranea

Binomial name
- Callianassa subterranea (Montagu, 1808)

Synonyms
- Callianassa (Callianassa) subterranea (Montagu, 1808); Callianassa (Cheramus) subterranea (Montagu, 1808); Callianassa helgolandica Lutze, 1938; Cancer (Astacus) subterraneus Montagu, 1808; Cancer lunulatus Nardo, 1847; Cheramus subterraneus (Montagu, 1808); Trypaea vilavelebita Sakai & Türkay, 2012

Species of crustacean

Callianassa subterranea is a species of burrowing ghost shrimp. This species is known by such generic common names as "mud shrimp" and "ghost shrimp".

== Description ==
Callianassa subterranea has an elongated body, a short small carapace, and a short rostrum. Its pale, translucent exoskeleton is not heavily calcified and remains relatively soft and flexible. Its large claws are unequal in size and are larger in males than in females. C. subterranea has very small eyes and grows up to 4 centimetres (1.6 in) in length.

Like many similar thalassinidean decapods, C. subterranea is a deposit-feeder that ingests sediment particles in order to scrape off and digest the organic coating called biofilm that sticks to them. To facilitate this type of foraging, its mouthparts, except for the mandible, are covered with a variety of setae designed for sediment denitrification. Its pereiopods are highly specialized for the digging activity of a deposit feeder and are not used for grooming.

== Range and habitat ==
C. subterranea has a widespread marine distribution from Norway to the Mediterranean Sea. It has been recorded in large numbers in the southern North Sea and the north-eastern Irish Sea. Its presence has been recorded on the south coast of Britain and the west coast of Scotland. In Ireland it has been recorded at a single site in the Kenmare River area. However, as it is a subterranean species, it likely has a more widespread range that has been recorded.

As its scientific name implies, this species has a burrowing habit and lives underneath the wet, sandy sediment of its benthic zone habitat. C. subterranea creates complex, multi-branched tunnel systems up to 81 cm deep from the lower shore to the shallow sublittoral. Each tunnel complex has several inhalant shafts which terminate on the surface with a funnel-shaped opening in the center of a conical mound of ejected sediment. Its burrows often interconnect in complex patterns with those inhabited by other species of burrowing fish and crabs such as Goneplax rhomboides, Cepola macrophthalma, Lesueurigobius friesii, and Nephrops norvegicus.

The construction of the burrows varies according to the characteristics of the sediment in which the individuals dwell and reach their maximum depth and complexity in Scottish sea lochs and other areas with fine-grained mud.
