= Gourretiidae =

Scientific classification
- Kingdom: Animalia
- Phylum: Arthropoda
- Clade: Pancrustacea
- Class: Malacostraca
- Order: Decapoda
- Suborder: Pleocyemata
- Infraorder: Axiidea
- Family: Gourretiidae; Sakai, 1999

Family of crustaceans

Gourretiidae is a family of crustaceans belonging to the infraorder Axiidea, within the order Decapoda.

== Phylogeny ==
The cladogram below shows Gourretiidae's placement within Axiidea, from analysis by Wolfe et al., 2019.

- Axiidea
  - Axiidae
  - - Callianideidae
    - - Gourretiidae
      - Callianassidae

== Genera ==
- Gourretia de Saint Laurent, 1973
- Heterogourretia Sakai, 2017
- Ivorygourretia Sakai, 2017
- Laurentgourretia Sakai, 2004
- Plantesgourretia Sakai, 2017
- Ruiyuliugourretia Sakai, 2017
- Tuerkaygourretia Sakai, 2017
