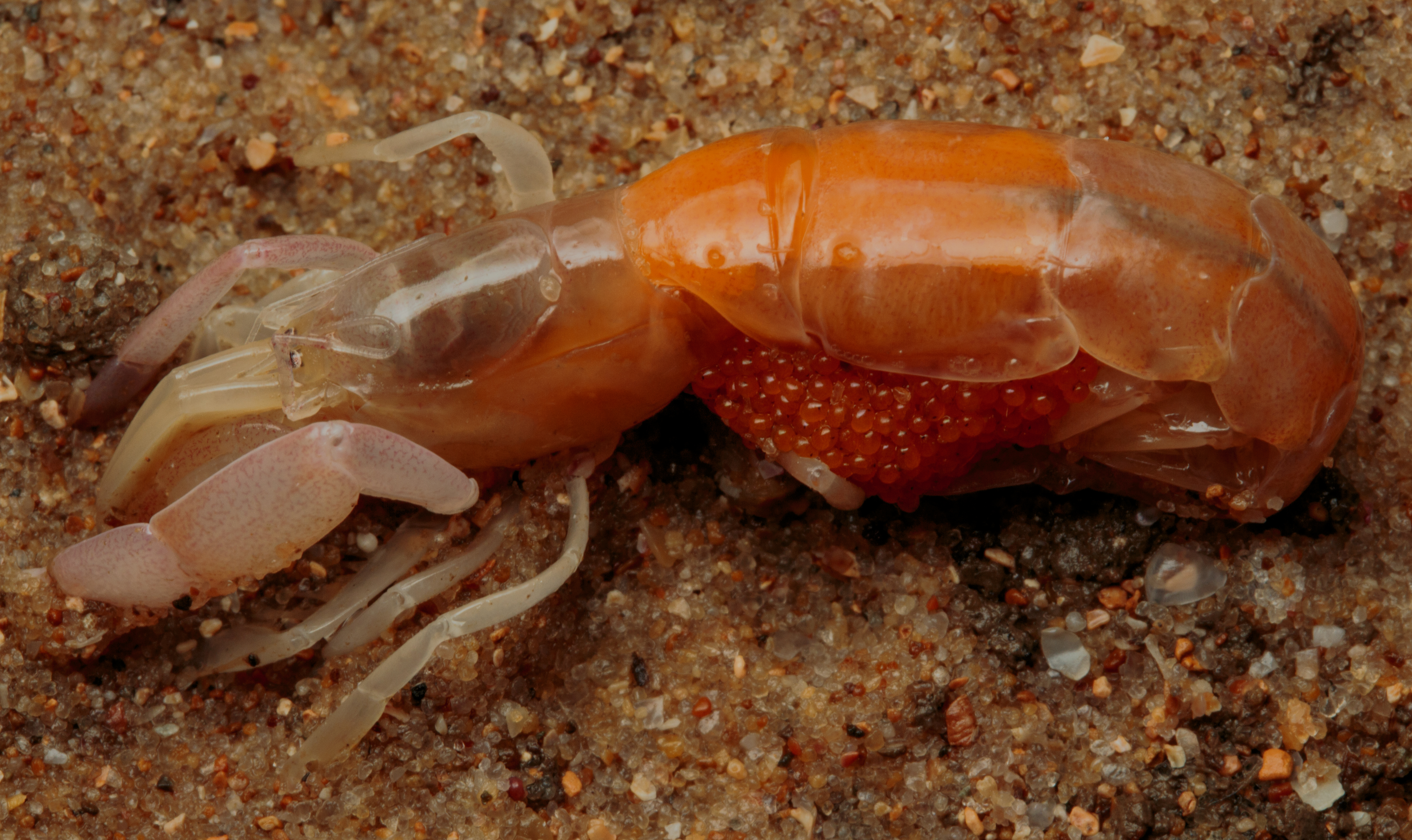

Scientific classification
- Domain: Eukaryota
- Kingdom: Animalia
- Phylum: Arthropoda
- Class: Malacostraca
- Order: Decapoda
- Suborder: Pleocyemata
- Family: Callianassidae
- Genus: Trypaea
- Species: T. australiensis

Binomial name
- Trypaea australiensis Dana, 1852

= Trypaea australiensis =

Species of crustacean

The Australian ghost shrimp, marine yabby, or ghost nipper (Trypaea australiensis) is a species of ghost shrimp in the family Callianassidae, found in Australia and the Indo-West Pacific region.

They are bio-irrigators and bioturbators in estuarine sediments, and are widely harvested by recreational anglers as fishing bait.
