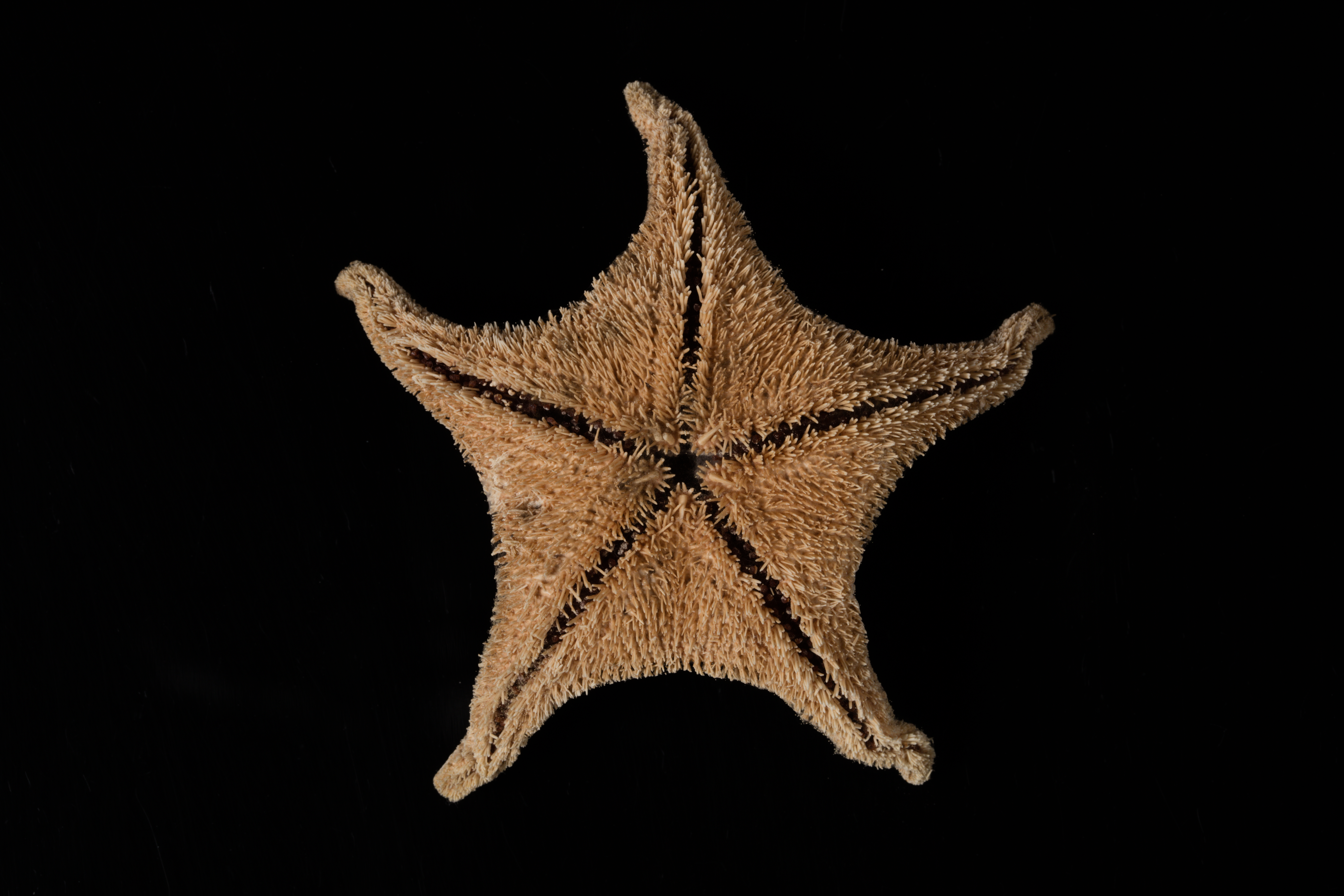
- Radiaster gracilis

Scientific classification
- Kingdom: Animalia
- Phylum: Echinodermata
- Class: Asteroidea
- Order: Paxillosida
- Family: Radiasteridae; Fisher, 1916

= Radiasteridae =

Family of echinoderms

Radiasteridae is a family of echinoderms belonging to the order Paxillosida.

Genera:

- Betelgeusia Blake & Reid, 1998
- Gephyriaster
- Indiaster Raghavendra Rao, 1957
- Radiaster Perrier, 1881
