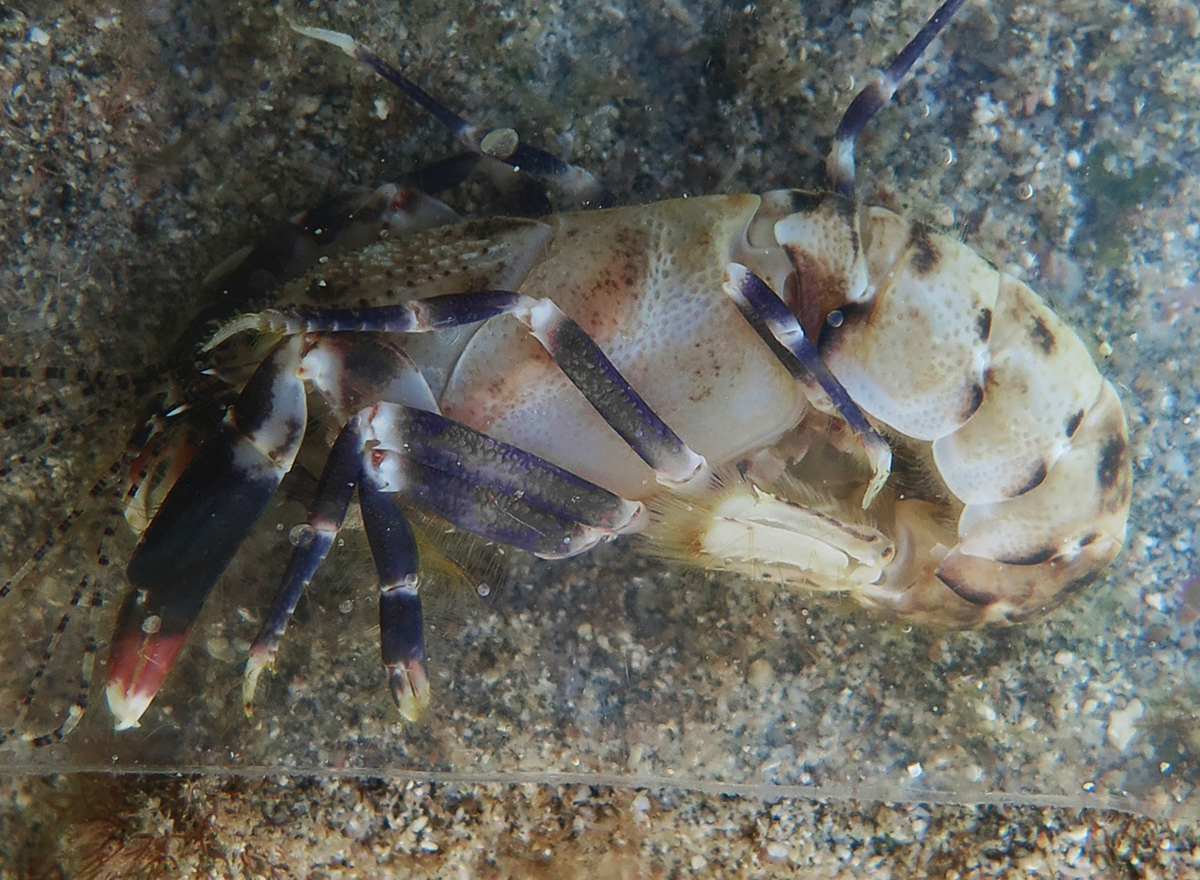
- Axiopsis pica

Scientific classification
- Kingdom: Animalia
- Phylum: Arthropoda
- Clade: Pancrustacea
- Class: Malacostraca
- Order: Decapoda
- Suborder: Pleocyemata
- Family: Axiidae
- Genus: Axiopsis; Borradaile, 1903

= Axiopsis =

Genus of crustaceans

Axiopsis is a genus of crustaceans belonging to the infraorder Axiidea, within the order Decapoda.

== Species ==
There are 8 species assigned to this genus of mud shrimp:

- Axiopsis baronai (Squires, 1977)
- Axiopsis brasiliensis (Coelho & Ramos-Porto, 1991)
- Axiopsis consobrina (De Man, 1905)
- Axiopsis irregularis (Edmondson, 1930)
- Axiopsis pica (Kensley, 2003)
- Axiopsis sculptimana (Ward, 1942)
- Axiopsis serratifrons (A. Milne-Edwards, 1873)
- Axiopsis tsushimaensis (Sakai, 1992)
