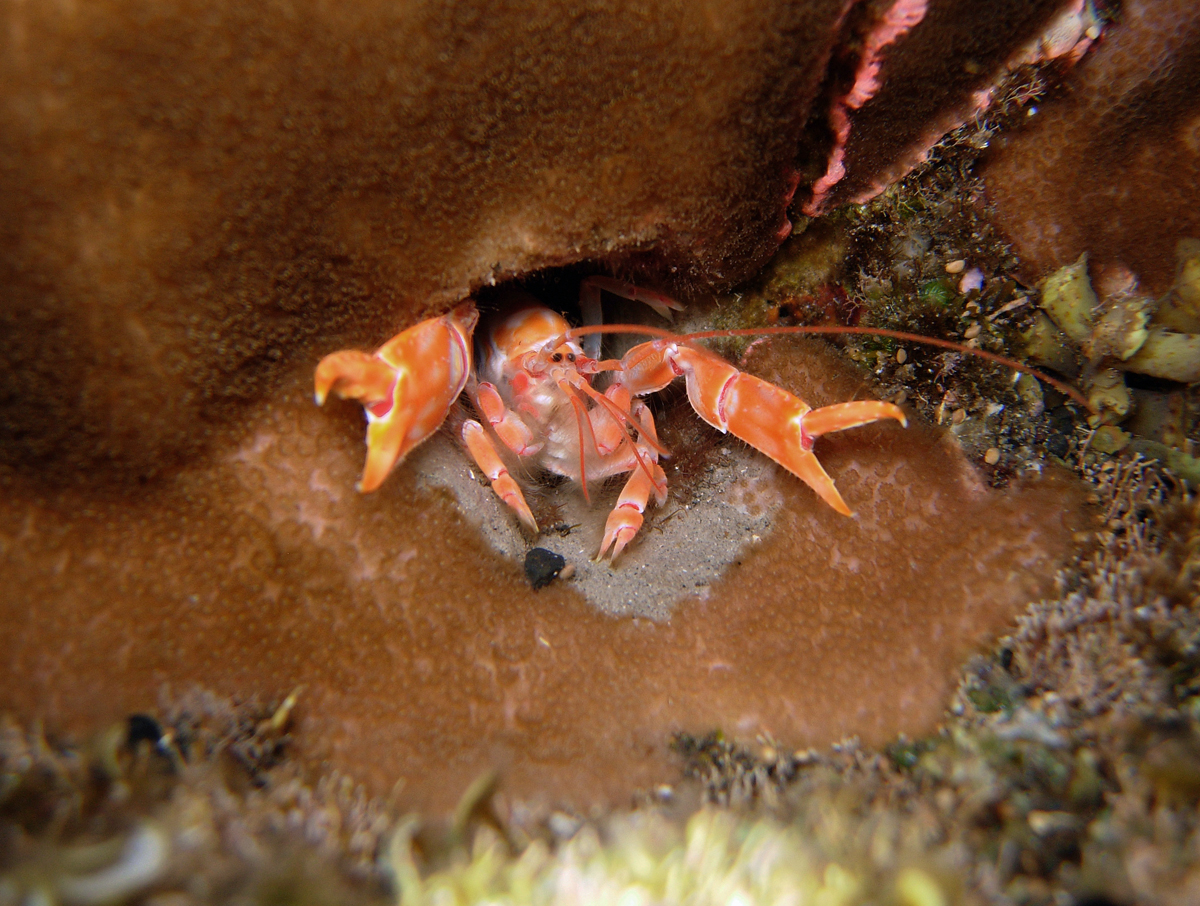
- Neaxius acanthus

Scientific classification
- Kingdom: Animalia
- Phylum: Arthropoda
- Clade: Pancrustacea
- Class: Malacostraca
- Order: Decapoda
- Suborder: Pleocyemata
- Infraorder: Axiidea
- Family: Strahlaxiidae; Poore, 1994

= Strahlaxiidae =

Family of crustaceans

Strahlaxiidae is a family of crustaceans belonging to the infraorder Axiidea, within the order Decapoda.

It contains the following genera:

- Neaxiopsis K.Sakai & de Saint Laurent, 1989
- Neaxius Borradaile, 1903
- Strahlaxius K.Sakai & de Saint Laurent, 1989
