= Ghost shrimp =

Ghost shrimp is a name applied to at least three different kinds of crustacean:

- Thalassinidea, crustaceans which live in deep burrows in the intertidal zone
- Caprellidae, amphipods with slender bodies more commonly known as "skeleton shrimps"
- Feeder shrimp (glass shrimp): Palaemonetes, small mostly transparent shrimp commonly sold for use in freshwater aquaria
  - Palaemonetes paludosus, a species common to the aquarium trade.

== See also ==
- Ghostshrimp (born 1980), pseudonym of Dan James, American graphic artist
