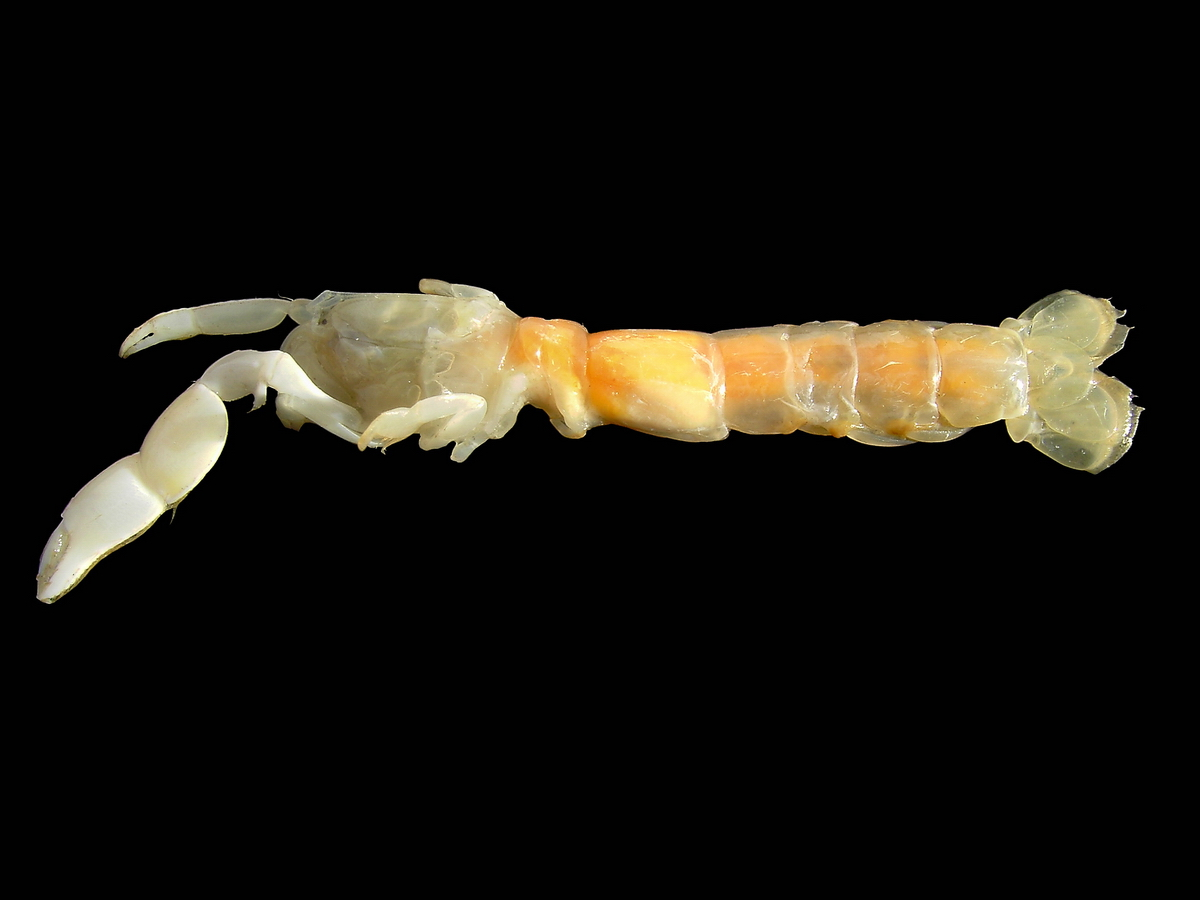
- Gilvossius tyrrhenus

Scientific classification
- Domain: Eukaryota
- Kingdom: Animalia
- Phylum: Arthropoda
- Class: Malacostraca
- Order: Decapoda
- Suborder: Pleocyemata
- Family: Callianassidae
- Genus: Gilvossius; Manning & Felder, 1992

Synonyms
- Gebios Bosc, 1813; Gebios Risso, 1822; Pestarella Ngoc-Ho, 2003

= Gilvossius =

Genus of crustaceans

Gilvossius is a genus of thalassinidean crustacean erected in 1992 from former members of the genus Callianassa. It is distinguished from Callianassa by the rounded, rather than squarish telson, and by the absence of the first two pleopods in males. The genus contains the following species:

- Gilvossius arguinensis Sakai, Türkay, Beuck & Freiwald, 2015
- Gilvossius candidus (Olivi, 1792)
- Gilvossius convexus (de Saint Laurent & Le Loeuff, 1979)
- Gilvossius fredericqae Felder & Robles, 2020
- Gilvossius howellorum Felder & Robles, 2020
- Gilvossius persicus (Sakai, 2005)
- Gilvossius rotundicaudatus (Stebbing, 1902)
- Gilvossius setimanus (De Kay, 1844)
- Gilvossius tyrrhenus (Petagna, 1792)
- Gilvossius whitei (Sakai, 1999)

Synonyms

- Gilvossius bouvieri (Nobili, 1904) accepted as Paratrypaea bouvieri (Nobili, 1904)
- Gilvossius brachytelson (Sakai, 2002) accepted as Cheramoides brachytelson (Sakai, 2002)
- Gilvossius chichijimaensis Sakai, 2015 accepted as Paratrypaea chichijimaensis (Sakai, 2015)
- Gilvossius diaphorus (Le Loeuff & Intes, 1975) accepted as Callianassa diaphora Le Loeuff & Intes, 1974
- Gilvossius gravieri (Nobili, 1906) accepted as Paratrypaea bouvieri (Nobili, 1904)
- Gilvossius marchali (Le Loeuff & Intes, 1974) accepted as Callianassa marchali Le Loeuff & Intes, 1974
- Gilvossius pacificus (Guzmán & Thatje, 2003) accepted as Neotrypaea pacifica (Guzmán & Thatje, 2003)
- Gilvossius tyrrhena (Petagna, 1792) accepted as Gilvossius tyrrhenus (Petagna, 1792)
- Gilvossius uncinatus (H. Milne Edwards, 1837) accepted as Neotrypaea uncinata (H. Milne Edwards, 1837)
