= Guyanacaris =

Scientific classification
- Domain: Eukaryota
- Kingdom: Animalia
- Phylum: Arthropoda
- Class: Malacostraca
- Order: Decapoda
- Suborder: Pleocyemata
- Family: Axiidae
- Genus: Guyanacaris; Sakai, 2011

Genus of shrimp

Guyanacaris is a genus of Axiidae shrimp. Its type species is Guyanacaris hirsutimana. It contains the following species:

- Guyanacaris caespitosa (Squires, 1979)
- Guyanacaris hirsutimana (Boesch & Smalley, 1972)
- Guyanacaris keralam (Padate, Cubelio & Takeda, 2022)
- Guyanacaris polychaetes (Sakai, 1994)
- Guyanacaris spinosissima (Rathbun, 1906)
- Guyanacaris thailandensis (Sakai, 2015)
- Guyanacaris xinzhengi Kou, Poore & Liu, 2024
