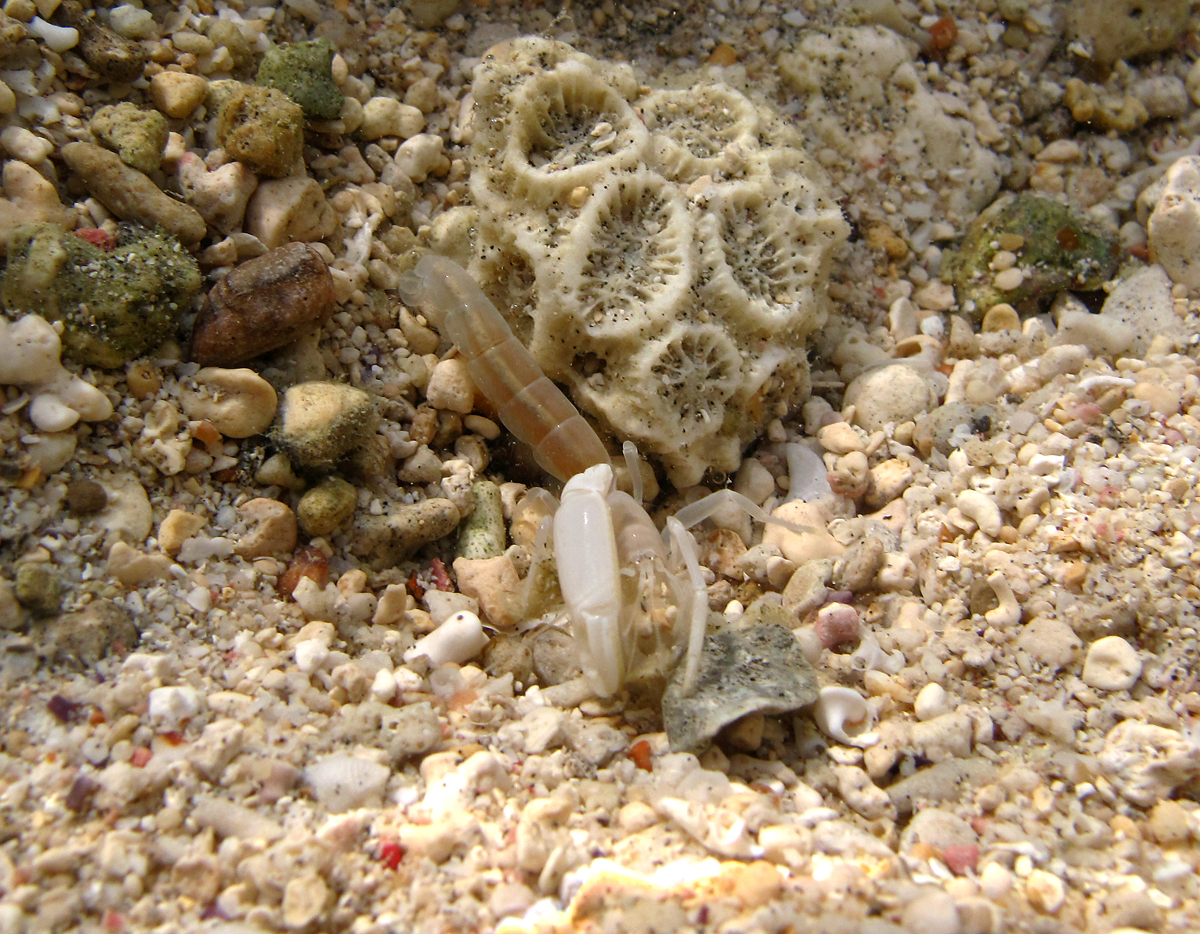
- Callianidea typa

Scientific classification
- Kingdom: Animalia
- Phylum: Arthropoda
- Clade: Pancrustacea
- Class: Malacostraca
- Order: Decapoda
- Suborder: Pleocyemata
- Clade: Reptantia
- Infraorder: Axiidea
- Family: Callianideidae; Kossmann, 1880

Synonyms
- Thomassiniidae

= Callianideidae =

Family of crustaceans

Callianideidae is a family of crustaceans belonging to the infraorder Axiidea, within the order Decapoda.

== Phylogeny ==
The cladogram below shows Callianideidae's placement within Axiidea, from analysis by Wolfe et al., 2019.

- Axiidea
  - Axiidae
  - - Callianideidae
    - - Gourretiidae
      - Callianassidae

== Genera ==
Callianideidae contains the following genera:

- Callianidea H.Milne Edwards, 1837
- Crosniera Kensley & Heard, 1991
- Heardaxius K.Sakai, 2011
- Mictaxius Kensley & Heard, 1991
- Paracallanidea Sakai, 1992
- Paracallianidea K.Sakai, 1992
- Thomassinia de Saint Laurent, 1979
