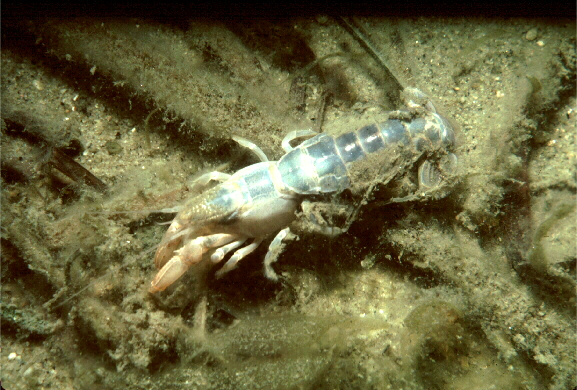

Scientific classification
- Kingdom: Animalia
- Phylum: Arthropoda
- Class: Malacostraca
- Order: Decapoda
- Suborder: Pleocyemata
- Family: Axiidae
- Genus: Axius
- Species: A. serratus

Binomial name
- Axius serratus Stimpson, 1852

= Axius serratus =

Species of crustacean

Axius serratus is a species of thalassinidean crustacean found off the Atlantic coast of Canada and the United States, from Nova Scotia to Maryland. It is capable of living in areas which are so polluted that other benthic animals cannot survive.
