= Etyiidae =

Etyiidae Temporal range: Cretaceous–Paleocene

Scientific classification
- Kingdom: Animalia
- Phylum: Arthropoda
- Clade: Pancrustacea
- Class: Malacostraca
- Order: Decapoda
- Suborder: Pleocyemata
- Infraorder: Brachyura
- Section: Dromiacea
- Superfamily: †Etyoidea
- Family: †Etyiidae; Guinot & Tavares, 2001

Extinct family of crabs

Etyiidae is a prehistoric family of dromiacean crabs only known from Cretaceous and a few Paleocene fossils.

== Genera ==
In their A classification of living and fossil genera of decapod crustaceans (2009), De Grave and colleagues include seven genera in Etyiidae:

- Caloxanthus A. Milne-Edwards, 1864
- Etyus Mantell, 1822
- Etyxanthosia Fraaije, Van Bakel, Jagt & Artal, 2008
- Feldmannia Guinot & Tavares, 2001
- Guinotosia Beschin, Busulini, De Angeli & Tessier, 2007
- Sharnia Collins & Saward, 2006
- Xanthosia Bell, 1863

More recently, several the more genera have been described and the family split into two. The World Register of Marine Species recognises eight genera in Etyidae and four in Feldmanniidae as follows:

†Etyidae Guinot & Tavares, 2001

- Etyus Leach in Mantell, 1844 †
- Etyxanthosia Fraaije, Van Bakel, Jagt & Artal, 2008 †
- Guinotosia Beschin, Busulini, De Angeli & Tessier, 2007 †
- Karyosia Schweitzer, Feldmann, Rader & Franţescu, 2016 †
- Rolerithosia Collins, Villier & Breton, 2013 †
- Secretanella Guinot & Tavares, 2001 †
- Sharnia Collins & Saward, 2006 †
- Steorrosia Schweitzer, Feldmann, Franţescu & Klompmaker, 2012 †

†Feldmanniidae Schweitzer, Feldmann, Franţescu & Klompmaker, 2012

- Bretonia Schweitzer, Feldmann, Franţescu & Klompmaker, 2012 †
- Caloxanthus A. Milne-Edwards, 1864 †
- Cantabroxanthus Ossó & Isa, 2014 †
- Feldmannia Guinot & Tavares, 2001 †
