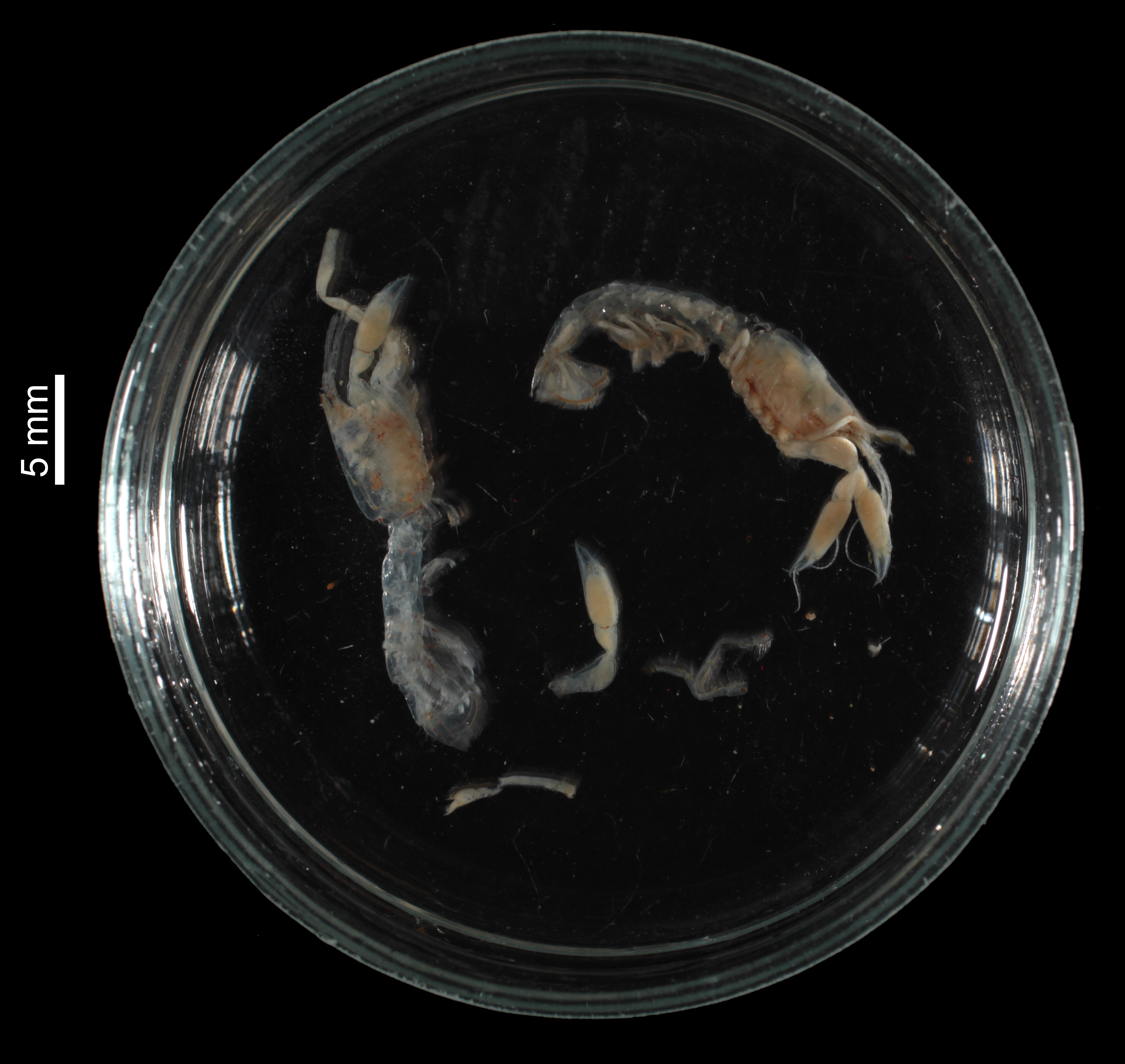
- PRESERVED_SPECIMEN; Tethisea indica Poore, 1994 ; Type status: PARATYPE; Identified by: Poore G.C.B.; Individual Count: 2 ; Event date: 1980-11-06T00:00:00Z

Scientific classification
- Kingdom: Animalia
- Phylum: Arthropoda
- Clade: Pancrustacea
- Class: Malacostraca
- Order: Decapoda
- Suborder: Pleocyemata
- Infraorder: Axiidea
- Family: Micheleidae; Sakai, 1992

= Micheleidae =

Family of crustaceans

Micheleidae is a family of crustaceans belonging to the infraorder Axiidea, within the order Decapoda.

It contains the following genera:

- †Amatukamius Karasawa & Ohara, 2019
- Marcusiaxius Rodrigues & de Carvalho, 1972
- Meticonaxius de Man, 1905
- Michelea Kensley & Heard, 1991
- †Paki Karasawa & Hayakawa, 2000
- Tethisea Poore, 1994
