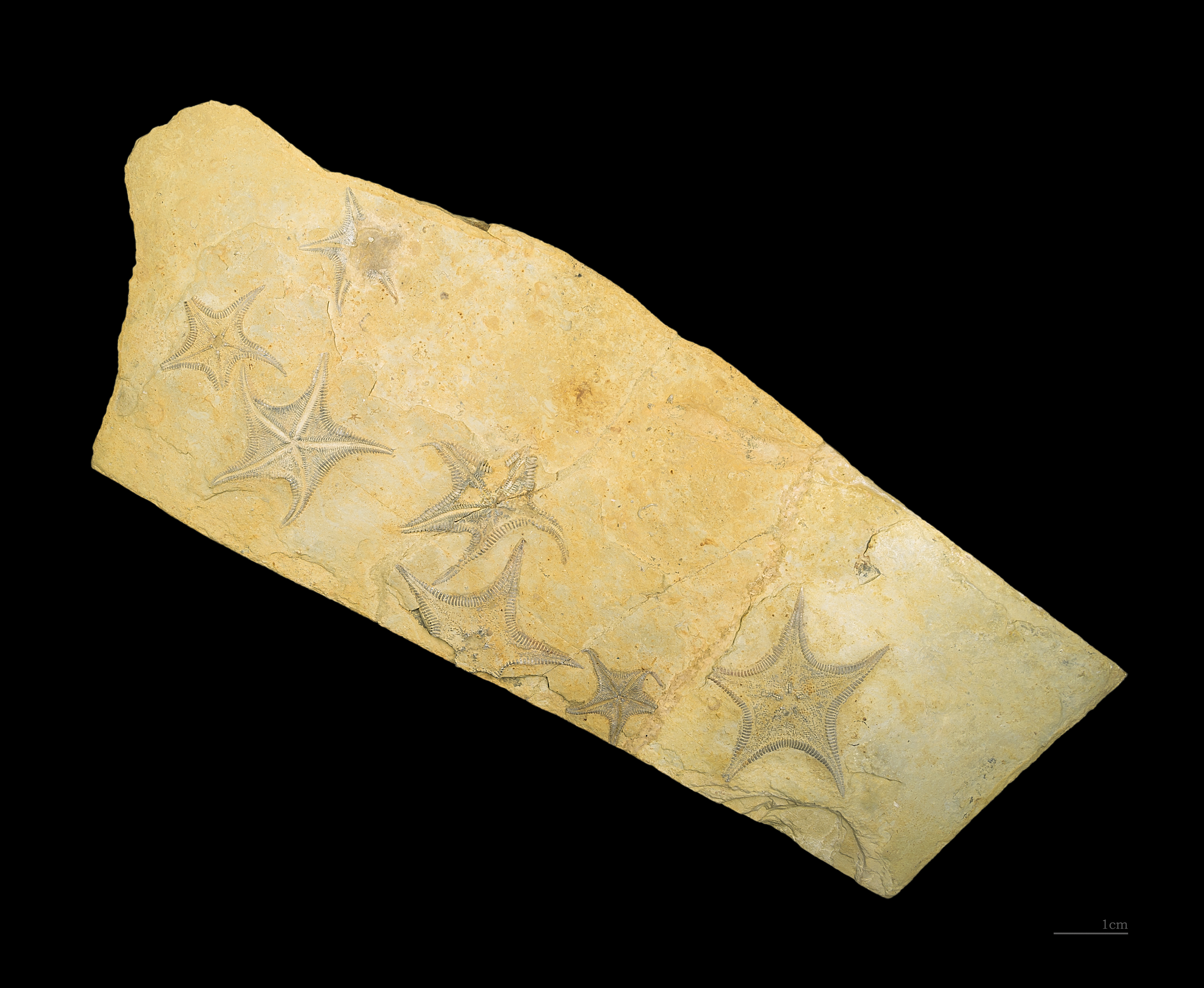
- B. orientalis - MHNT

Scientific classification
- Domain: Eukaryota
- Kingdom: Animalia
- Phylum: Echinodermata
- Class: Asteroidea
- Order: Paxillosida
- Family: Radiasteridae
- Genus: †Betelgeusia; Blake & Reid, 1998

Type species
- Betelgeusia riedi Blake & Reid, 1998

= Betelgeusia =

Betelgeusia Temporal range: Middle Jurassic–Cretaceous

Extinct genus of starfishes

Betelgeusia is an extinct genus of sea stars in the family Radiasteridae. It was described by Blake and Reid, in 1998, and existed in what is now the Netherlands, Texas, United States, Morocco, and India, during the Middle Jurassic through the Cretaceous period. It contains the species B. brezinai, B. exposita, B. riedi, and B. orientalis.
