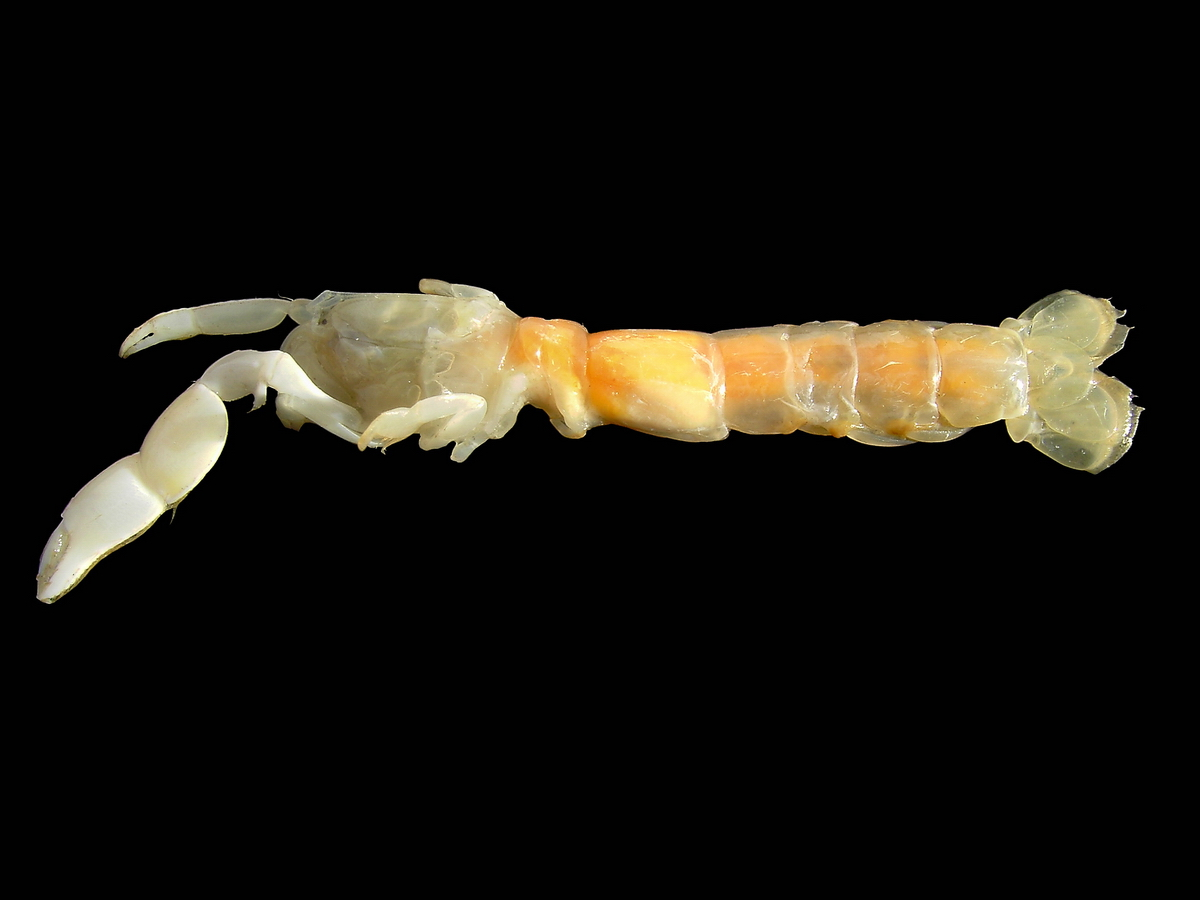

Scientific classification
- Kingdom: Animalia
- Phylum: Arthropoda
- Class: Malacostraca
- Order: Decapoda
- Suborder: Pleocyemata
- Family: Callianassidae
- Genus: Gilvossius
- Species: G. tyrrhenus

Binomial name
- Gilvossius tyrrhenus (Petagna, 1792)

Synonyms
- Callianassa laticauda Otto, 1821; Callianassa stebbingi Borradaile, 1903; Callianassa tyrrhena (Petagna, 1792); Pestarella tyrrhena (Petagna, 1792)

= Gilvossius tyrrhenus =

Species of crustacean

Gilvossius tyrrhenus (formerly Pestarella tyrrhena) is a species of mud shrimp which grows to a length of 70 mm (2.8 in). It lives in burrows in shallow sandy parts of the sea-bed in the Mediterranean Sea and northern Atlantic Ocean. It is the most common thalassinidean in the Mediterranean, and has been used as bait by fishermen for at least 200 years.

== Description ==
G. tyrrhenus is a small crustacean, up to 70 millimetres (2.8 in) long, with a soft exoskeleton apart from two large, unequal claws. It is whitish or greenish-grey, with pink or blue spots. Because of its burrowing lifestyle, G. tyrrhenus has small eyes on short stalks, and its maxillipeds can form an operculum; the telson is very short, and the rostrum is almost entirely absent.

Larval development is rapid and involves few stages. Eggs hatch into a zoeal stage, which is followed by a second zoea and then a megalopa stage before adulthood. This rapid development allows the larvae to settle down into their adult habitat of relatively undisturbed muddy substrates, before they have travelled too far as planktonic larvae. Larval development is retarded by low salinities and aided by warmer temperatures, giving G. tyrrhenus a shorter reproductive season in the north of its range than in the south.

== Distribution and ecology ==
G. tyrrhenus was first described from the Tyrrhenian Sea, and is found throughout the Mediterranean as well as in the Atlantic Ocean from Mauritania and the Canary Islands north to Ireland, in the Kattegat, and in the North Sea as far as southern Norway. Related species occur in the Black Sea, and G. tyrrhenus avoids water of low salinity, such as estuaries and the Baltic Sea.

The burrows of G. tyrrhenus may be up to 62 centimetres (24 in) deep. They comprise a spiral central shaft up to 20 mm wide, with one or more shallow U–shaped shafts (up to 11 mm or 0.43 in wide) which lead to the surface of the sediment where they emerge as holes or funnel–shaped depressions. These shafts may be linked by further sections, and a number of side–chambers are found filled with seagrass. The overall volume of the burrow may reach 300 millilitres (11 imp fl oz; 10 US fl oz). New tunnels are continually opened and old ones filled in. G. tyrrhenus feeds directly on the sediment, and receives nutrition from the debris collected in the debris chambers, as well as from the foraminiferans and algae which live on the walls of the burrow. The activity of G. tyrrhenus leads the walls of the burrow to be enriched with three times the ambient number of nematodes and more than 100 times the number of foraminiferans in the surrounding sediments.

G. tyrrhenus is parasitised by the isopod Ione thoracica and the barnacle Parthenopea subterranea.
