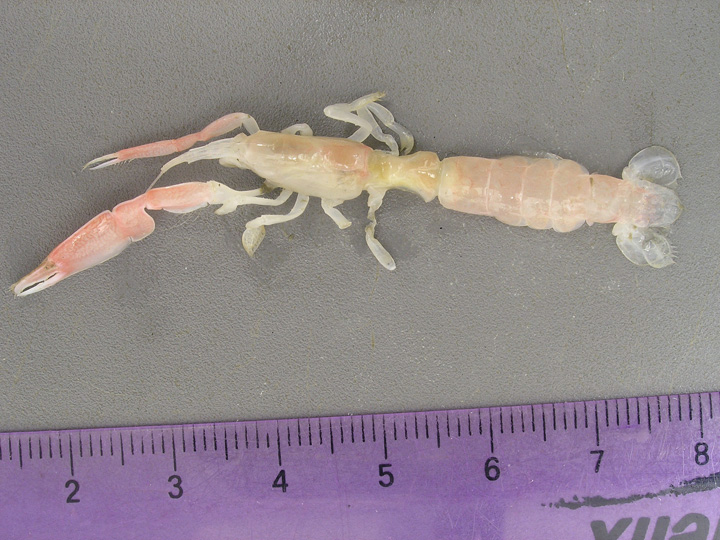
- Dawsonius latispinus

Scientific classification
- Kingdom: Animalia
- Phylum: Arthropoda
- Clade: Pancrustacea
- Class: Malacostraca
- Order: Decapoda
- Suborder: Pleocyemata
- Infraorder: Axiidea
- Family: Ctenochelidae; Manning & Felder, 1991

= Ctenochelidae =

Family of decapod crustaceans

Ctenochelidae is a family of decapods belonging to the infraorder Axiidea.

It contains the following genera:

- †Ahazianassa Karasawa, Kishimoto, Ohara & Ando, 2019
- †Cretagourretia Ossó, Charbonnier, Hyžný, Van Bakel & Devillez in Ossó, Charbonnier, Hyžný, Van Bakel, Devillez, Bover-Arnal & Moreno Bedmar, 2024
- Ctenocheles Kishinouye, 1926
- Ctenocheloides Anker, 2010
- Dawsonius R.B.Manning & Felder, 1991
- Gourretia de Saint Laurent, 1973
- Kiictenocheloides K.Sakai, 2013
- Laurentgourretia K.Sakai, 2004
- Paragourretia K.Sakai, 2004
