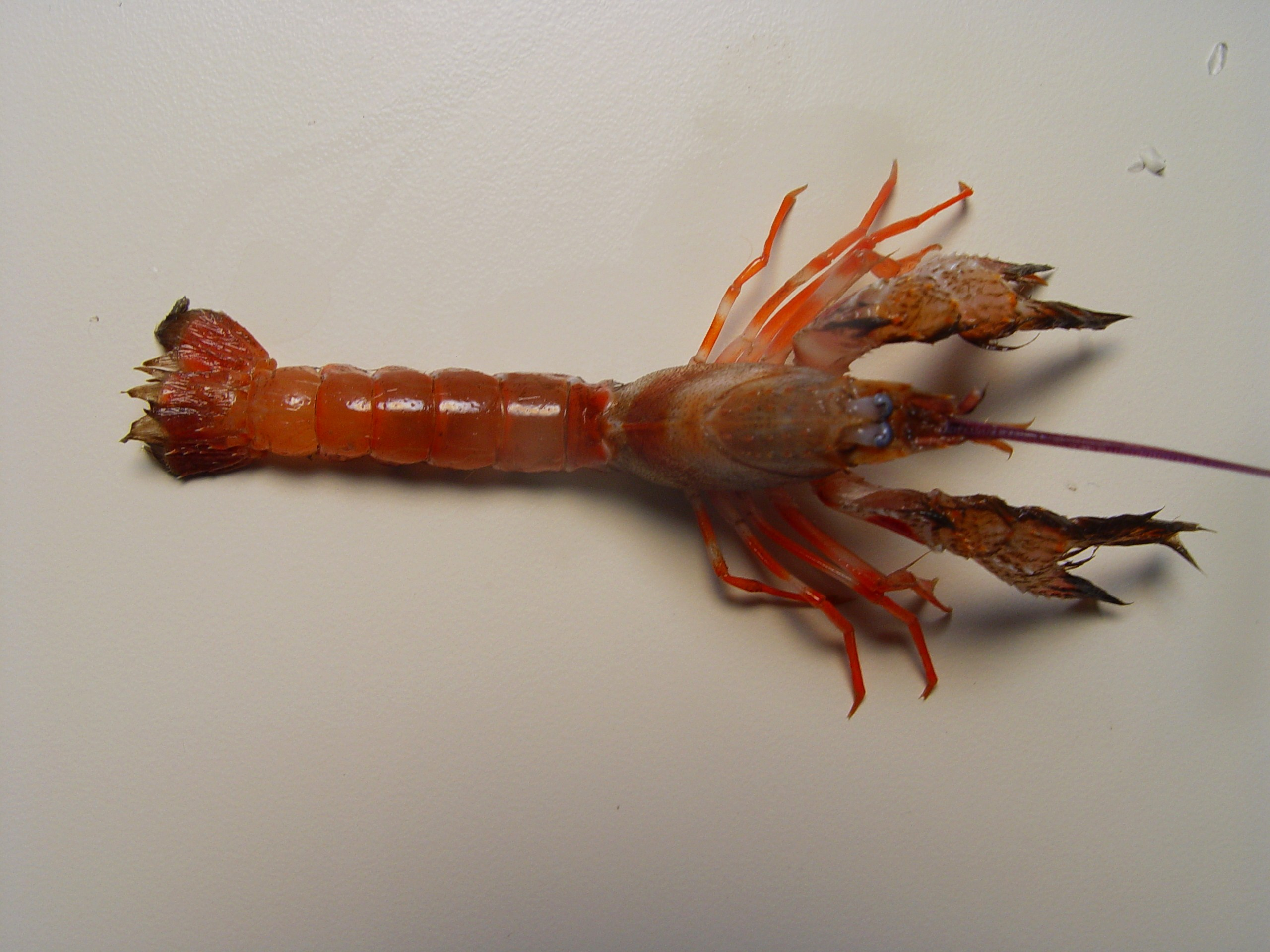
- Acanthaxius hirsutimanus

Scientific classification
- Domain: Eukaryota
- Kingdom: Animalia
- Phylum: Arthropoda
- Class: Malacostraca
- Order: Decapoda
- Suborder: Pleocyemata
- Family: Axiidae
- Genus: Acanthaxius; Sakai & de Saint Laurent, 1989

Type species
- Acanthaxius pilocheirus Sakai, 1987

= Acanthaxius =

Genus of crustaceans

Acanthaxius is a genus of mud lobster native to the Indo-Pacific oceans. It has a slender rostrum which is longer than the eyestalks, is spinose and has seven spines and has a depth range of 228–438 metres (748–1,437 ft).

== Species ==
The genus Acanthaxius includes the following species:

- †Acanthaxius carinatus Franţescu, 2014
- Acanthaxius formosa Kensley & Chan, 1998
- Acanthaxius garawa Poore & Collins, 2009
- Acanthaxius gathaagudu Poore & Collins, 2009
- Acanthaxius grandis Kensley & Chan, 1998
- Acanthaxius kashimaensis Sakai, 2017
- Acanthaxius miyazakiensis (Yokoya, 1933)
- Acanthaxius ningaloo Poore & Collins, 2009
- Acanthaxius pilocheirus (Sakai, 1987)
- Acanthaxius polyacanthus (Miyake & Sakai, 1967)
- Acanthaxius sapulo Poore, 2020

Three species of Acanthaxius have been found off the Solomon Islands.
