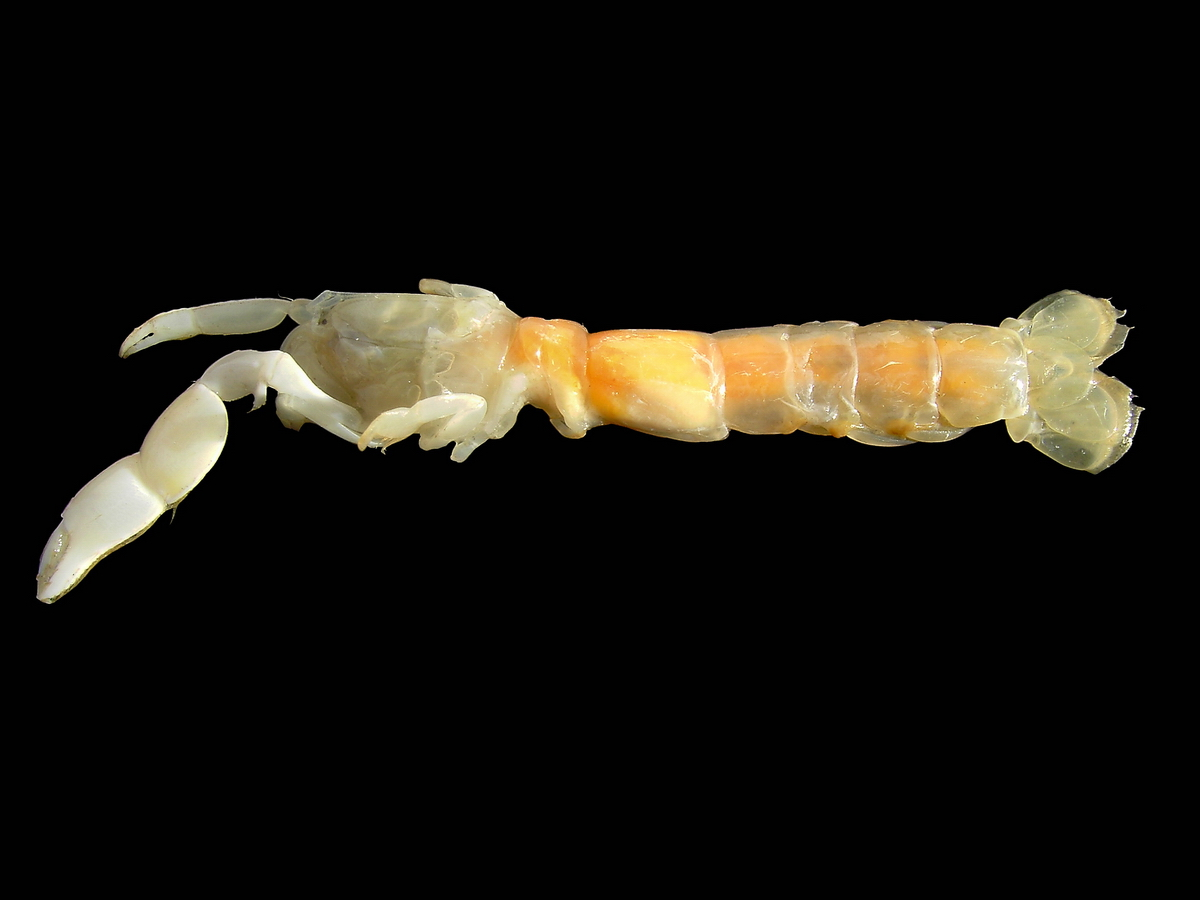
- Pestarella tyrrhena

Scientific classification
- Kingdom: Animalia
- Phylum: Arthropoda
- Clade: Pancrustacea
- Class: Malacostraca
- Order: Decapoda
- Suborder: Pleocyemata
- Clade: Reptantia
- Infraorder: Axiidea
- Family: Callianassidae; Dana, 1852

Genera
- See text

= Callianassidae =

Callianassidae Temporal range: 323–0 Ma Pennsylvanian to Recent (based on Ophiomorpha trace fossils)

Family of crustaceans

Callianassidae is a family of ghost shrimp crustaceans belonging to the infraorder Axiidea, within the order Decapoda.

== Phylogeny ==
The cladogram below shows Callianassidae's placement within Axiidea, from analysis by Wolfe et al., 2019.

- Axiidea
  - Axiidae
  - - Callianideidae
    - - Gourretiidae
      - Callianassidae

== Genera ==
Callianassidae is divided into 41 genera:

- Aqaballianassa Poore, Dworschak, Robles, Mantelatto & Felder, 2019
- Arenallianassa Poore, Dworschak, Robles, Mantelatto & Felder, 2019
- Biffarius R.B. Manning & Felder, 1991
- †Brecanclawu Schweitzer & Feldmann, 2001
- Callianassa Leach, 1814
- Callianopsis De Saint Laurent, 1973
- Caviallianassa Poore, Dworschak, Robles, Mantelatto & Felder, 2019
- Cheramoides K. Sakai, 2011
- Cheramus Bate, 1888
- †Comoxianassa Schweitzer, Feldmann, Ćosović, Ross & Waugh, 2009
- Coriollianassa Poore, Dworschak, Robles, Mantelatto & Felder, 2019
- †Cowichianassa Schweitzer, Feldmann, Ćosović, Ross & Waugh, 2009
- †Eoglypturus Beschin, De Angeli, Checchi & Zarantonello, 2005
- Filhollianassa Poore, Dworschak, Robles, Mantelatto & Felder, 2019
- Fragillianassa Poore, Dworschak, Robles, Mantelatto & Felder, 2019
- Gilvossius R.B. Manning & Felder, 1992
- Jocullianassa Poore, Dworschak, Robles, Mantelatto & Felder, 2019
- Lipkecallianassa K. Sakai, 2002
- †Melipal Schweitzer & Feldmann, 2006
- †Mesostylus Bronn & Roemer, 1852
- Necallianassa Heard & R.B. Manning, 1998
- Neotrypaea R.B. Manning & Felder, 1991
- Notiax R.B. Manning & Felder, 1991
- Paratrypaea Komai & Tachikawa, 2008
- †Pleuronassa Ossó-Morales, Garassino, Vega & Artal, 2011
- Poti Rodrigues & R.B. Manning, 1992
- Praedatrypaea Poore, Dworschak, Robles, Mantelatto & Felder, 2019
- †Protocallianassa Beurlen, 1930
- †Psammionassa Schweitzer, Feldmann, Kues & Bridge, 2017
- Pugnatrypaea Poore, Dworschak, Robles, Mantelatto & Felder, 2019
- †Rathbunassa Hyžný in Bermúdez, Gómez-Cruz, Hyžný, Moreno-Bedmar, Barragán, Sánchez & Vega, 2013
- Rayllianassa Komai & Tachikawa, 2008
- Rudisullianassa Poore, Dworschak, Robles, Mantelatto & Felder, 2019
- Scallasis Bate, 1888
- †Semiranina Bachmayer, 1954
- Spinicallianassa Poore, Dworschak, Robles, Mantelatto & Felder, 2019
- Tastrypaea Poore, Dworschak, Robles, Mantelatto & Felder, 2019
- Trypaea Dana, 1852
- †Turbiocheir Schweitzer, Feldmann, Casadío & Rodriguez Raising, 2012
- †Vecticallichirus Quayle & Collins, 2012
- †Vegarthron Schweitzer & Feldmann, 2002
