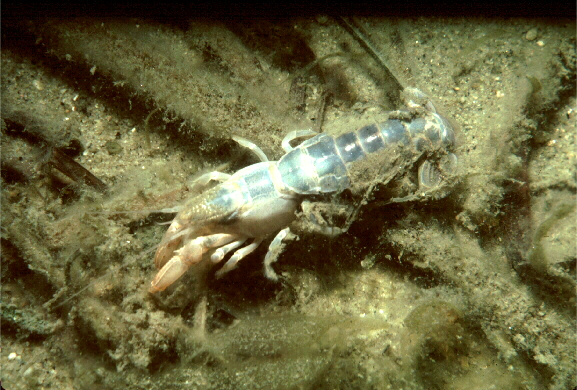
- Axius serratus

Scientific classification
- Kingdom: Animalia
- Phylum: Arthropoda
- Clade: Pancrustacea
- Class: Malacostraca
- Order: Decapoda
- Suborder: Pleocyemata
- Clade: Reptantia
- Infraorder: Axiidea de Saint Laurent, 1979

Families
- Anacalliacidae; Axiidae; Callianassidae; Callianideidae; Callianopsidae; Callichiridae; Ctenochelidae; Eucalliacidae; Micheleidae; Paracalliacidae; Strahlaxiidae; †Venipaguridae

= Axiidea =

Infraorder of crustaceans

Axiidea is an infraorder of decapod crustaceans. They are colloquially known as mud shrimp, ghost shrimp, or burrowing shrimp; however, these decapods are only distantly related to true shrimp. Axiidea and Gebiidea are divergent infraorders of the former infraorder Thalassinidea. These infraorders have converged ecologically and morphologically as burrowing forms. Based on molecular evidence as of 2009, it is now widely believed that these two infraorders represent two distinct lineages separate from one another. Since this is a recent change, much of the literature and research surrounding these infraorders still refers to the Axiidea and Gebiidea in combination as "thalassinidean" for the sake of clarity and reference. This division based on molecular evidence is consistent with the groupings proposed by Robert Gurney in 1938 based on larval developmental stages.

Axiidea are noted for the burrows with complex architecture that they make in the ocean floor sediment. These burrows can be classified based on their external characteristics in the sediment as well as the trophic group that the species falls into. The population density of most species of Axiidea tends to be high, so these organisms play an important role in the biogeochemical processes of the ocean floor sediments, and in the creation of habitats that favor various marine benthic communities.

== Classification ==
The infraorder Axiidea belongs to the group Reptantia, which consists of the walking/crawling decapods (lobsters and crabs). The cladogram below shows Axiidea as more basal than Gebiidea within the larger order Decapoda, from analysis by Wolfe et al., 2019.

- Decapoda
  - - Dendrobranchiata (prawns)
  - Pleocyemata
    - - Stenopodidea (boxer shrimp)
      - - Procarididea
        - Caridea ("true" shrimp)
    - Reptantia (crawling / walking decapods)
      - - Achelata (spiny lobsters and slipper lobsters)
        - - Polychelida (benthic crustaceans)
          - Glypheidea (glypheoid lobsters)
          - Astacidea (lobsters and crayfish)
      - - Axiidea (mud shrimp, ghost shrimp, and burrowing shrimp)
        - - Gebiidea (mud lobsters and mud shrimp)
          - - Anomura (hermit crabs and allies)
            - Brachyura ("true" crabs)

The infraorder Axiidea comprises the following families:

- Anacalliacidae Manning & Felder, 1991
- Axiidae Huxley, 1879
- Callianassidae Dana, 1852
- Callianideidae Kossmann, 1880
- Callianopsidae Manning & Felder, 1991
- Callichiridae Manning & Felder, 1991
- Ctenochelidae Manning and Felder, 1991
- Eucalliacidae Manning & Felder, 1991
- Micheleidae Sakai, 1992
- Paracalliacidae Sakai, 2005
- Strahlaxiidae Poore, 1994
- † Venipaguridae Collins, 2011

A few subfamilies of Axiidea have been proposed to become families, but have not for a variety of reasons. Examples of these subfamilies include the subfamily Gourretiidae, discovered by Sakai in 1999. Gourretiidae is a subfamily of the Ctenochelidae, and has been proposed to become a family instead, but phylogenetic analyses do not yet support that proposal. Similarly, molecular studies do not support the subfamily Eiconaxiidae being separate from family Axiidae. There is also no molecular evidence to separate the subfamily Calocardidae from Axiidae.

The cladogram below shows Axiidea's internal family relationships from analysis by Wolfe et al., 2019.

- Axiidea
  - Axiidae
  - - Callianideidae
    - - Gourretiidae
      - Callianassidae

== Description ==
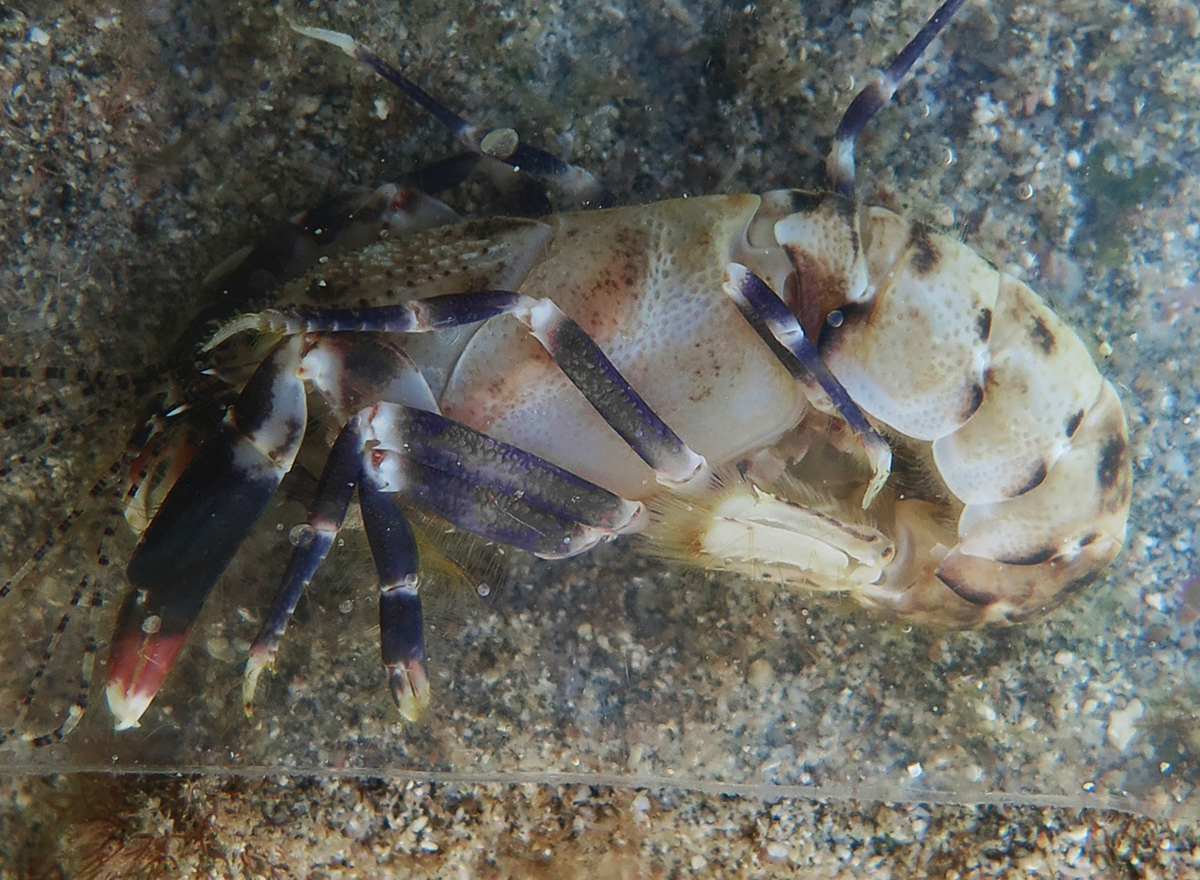
Axiopsis pica, a species under the Axiidae.

The length of an adult Axiidea can range from about 1.5 cm (0.6 in) in some species, to over 35 cm (14 in) in other species. The color of the Axiidea can range a variety of colors, including white, pink, red, orange, and dark brown. The rostrum can range from being nearly invisible, to fairly rigid and extending past the eyes. The carapace also ranges from fairly rigid to transparent, showing the organs underneath. Axiidea can range from having a well-calcified exoskeleton, to barely calcified elongated exoskeletons, which show an adaptation to burrowing in certain species.

The sex of the Axiidea can be determined by the pleopod structure on the underbelly of the organism. This structure is underdeveloped or absent in the males. The sex ratio in most species of Axiidea tends to be 1:1, although in certain habitats one sex can slightly outnumber the other.

Duration of egg incubation periods, and therefore also larval development, is dependent on the environmental factors surrounding the habitat of each individual species. Environmental factors tend to include developmental constraints, salinity of the marine environment, and temperature of the water. Furthermore, the duration of the zoeal, or larval, phase ranges quite a bit, and has been estimated to last as little as 2 to 3 days in some species of Axiidea, to 5 to 6 months in other species. The pre-zoeal hatching stage is marked by poor swimming ability and lack of setae, and the zoeal stages are planktonic. The megalopa stage represents the transition from plankton to their benthic habitats, and morphological development is marked by the growth of functional mouthparts resembling those of juveniles or adults.

== Burrows ==
Burrows can be divided into two groups in terms of external characteristics, depending on the existence of a mound of sediment around the entrance of the burrow. These two groups can be further divided based on whether they contain plant material within the burrow. Burrows tend to be narrow, and can range from Y or U shaped in certain species, to intricate branching tunnels and deep wells in other species.

Burrows can also differ within the classifications of external characteristics, based on the feeding mode for each organism. There are three general trophic groups that the families within the infraorder Axiidea can fall into. The first trophic group are the detritophages, or deposit feeders. The other two trophic groups are the drift catchers, which collect plant matter that drifts based on ocean currents, and the suspension feeders, which feed on plant matter that is suspended in the water.

Drift catcher burrows tend to lack the external characteristic of the mound around the entrance of the burrow, and their burrows tend to be very deep and contain chambers that are filled with seagrasses and other sea debris.

Suspension feeder burrows tend to be in the Y or U shapes, and also lack seagrasses and debris within them in contrast to the drift catchers; furthermore, the sediment within the lower parts of these burrows can also serve as food for the suspension feeders.

The burrows created by detritophage species of Axiidea are more likely to change over the life of the organism than the burrows of filter feeders because detritophage species of Axiidea can build new passages and chambers over the course of their feeding.

The feeding mode affects the burrow, because Axiidea consume amounts of sediment, and the sediment that is rejected makes up parts of the burrow. The seagrasses consumed by the Axiidea are therefore present in the burrows and provide a way to classify the species.

Each burrow is typically inhabited by one organism, however, certain species of Axiidea live in pairs.

== Distribution and ecology ==
Axiidea typically live in marine environments with soft-bottom sediments. Axiidea are found in most oceans and seas, except for high latitude polar seas. Distribution shows a clear gradient based on latitude, with low species numbers at higher latitudes and higher species numbers in low latitudes. Therefore, Axiidea are most diverse in temperate to tropical regions. Within the intertidal regions, Axiidea can be used as fishing bait or even for human consumption. Axiidea rarely range into the deep sea with depths more than 2,000 m (6,600 ft), instead with 95% of species preferring the shallow water of intertidal or subtidal (less than 200 m or 660 ft) areas.
