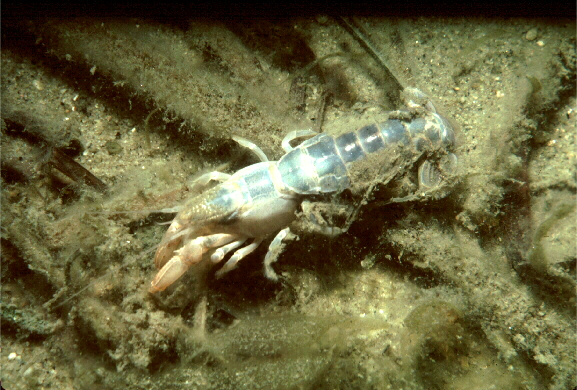
- Axius serratus

Scientific classification
- Kingdom: Animalia
- Phylum: Arthropoda
- Clade: Pancrustacea
- Class: Malacostraca
- Order: Decapoda
- Suborder: Pleocyemata
- Clade: Reptantia
- Infraorder: Axiidea
- Family: Axiidae; Huxley, 1879

Synonyms
- Calocarididae; Eiconaxiidae

= Axiidae =

Family of crustaceans

Axiidae is a family of crustaceans belonging to the infraorder Axiidea, within the order Decapoda.

== Phylogeny ==
The cladogram below shows Axiidae's placement within Axiidea, from analysis by Wolfe et al., 2019.

- Axiidea
  - Axiidae
  - - Callianideidae
    - - Gourretiidae
      - Callianassidae

== Genera ==
Axiidae includes the following genera:

- Acanthaxius Sakai & de Saint Laurent, 1989
- Alienaxiopsis Sakai, 2011
- Allaxiopsis Sakai, 2011
- Allaxius Sakai & de Saint Laurent, 1989
- Amakusaxius Sakai, 2011
- Ambiaxiopsis Komai, 2011
- Ambiaxius Sakai & de Saint Laurent, 1989
- Anophthalmaxius De Man, 1905
- †Aperiopyxis Schweigert, 2009
- †Aptaxiopsis Ferratges, Hyžný & Zamora, 2021
- Australocaris Poore & Collins, 2009
- Axiopsis Borradaile, 1903
- Axiorygma Kensley & Simmons, 1988
- Axius Leach, 1816
- Bathyaxius Sakai, 2014
- Boasaxius Sakai, 2011
- Bouvieraxius Sakai & de Saint Laurent, 1989
- Calastacus Faxon, 1893
- Calaxiopsis Sakai & de Saint Laurent, 1989
- Calaxius Sakai & de Saint Laurent, 1989
- Calocarides Wollebaek, 1908
- Calocaris Bell, 1846
- †Campanaxius Nyborg, Hyžný & Haggart, 2023
- Carolinaxius Kou, Poore & Li, 2021
- Coralaxius Kensley & Gore, 1981
- †Cretaxiopsis Charbonnier, Audo, Garassino & Hyžný, 2017
- †Devonoaxius Feldmann & Schweitzer, 2019
- Dorphinaxius Sakai & de Saint Laurent, 1989
- Eiconaxius Spence Bate, 1888
- †Etallonia Oppel, 1861
- Eucalastacus Sakai, 1992
- Eutrichocheles Wood-Mason, 1876
- Formosaxius Komai, Lin & Chan, 2010
- Guyanacaris Sakai, 2011
- †Hinecaris Karasawa, Kishimoto, Ohara & Ando, 2019
- †Huxleycaris Bravi & Garassino, 1998
- Leonardsaxius Sakai, 2011
- Levantocaris Galil & Clark, 1993
- †Libanoaxius Charbonnier, Audo, Garassino & Hyžný, 2017
- Litoraxius Komai & Tachikawa, 2007
- Lophaxiopsis Sakai, 2011
- Lophaxius Kensley, 1989
- †Magila Münster, 1839
- Manaxius Kensley, 2003
- Marianaxius Kensley, 1996
- †Megachela Schweigert, 2003
- Michelaxiopsis Poore & Collins, 2009
- Montanaxius Dworschak, 2016
- Oxyrhynchaxius Parisi, 1917
- Parascytoleptus Sakai & de Saint Laurent, 1989
- Paraxiopsis De Man, 1905
- Paraxius Bate, 1888
- Pilbaraxius Poore & Collins, 2009
- Pillsburyaxius Sakai, 2011
- Planaxius Komai & Tachikawa, 2008
- †Protaxius Beurlen, 1930
- Pseudoaxiopsis Sakai, 2011
- Ralumcaris Sakai, 2011
- †Schlueteria Fritsch in Fritsch & Kafka, 1887
- Scytoleptus Gerstaecker, 1856
- Spongiaxius Sakai & de Saint Laurent, 1989
