= Thalassinidea =

Infraorder of crustaceans

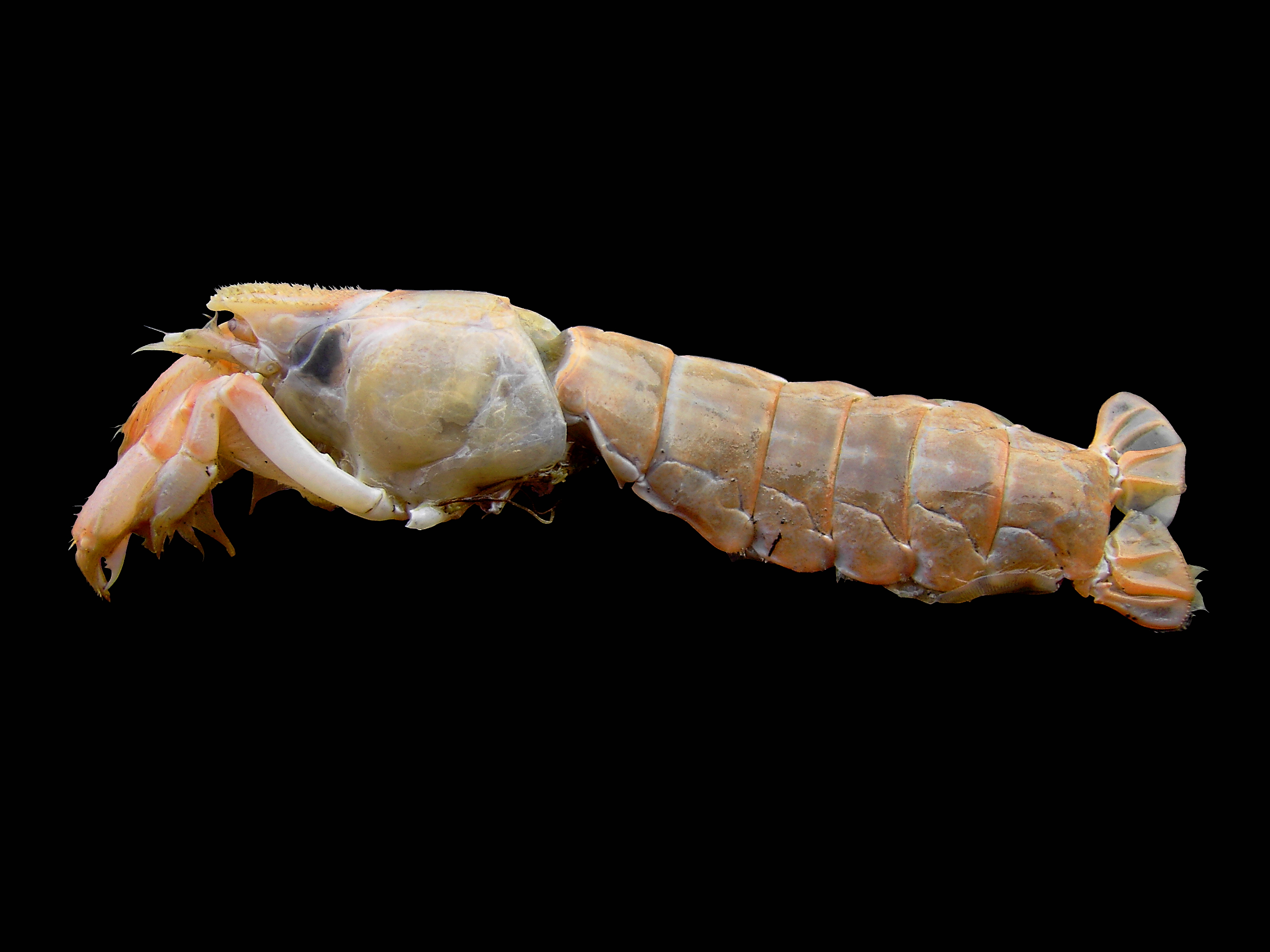
Upogebia deltaura (Gebiidea: Upogebiidae)

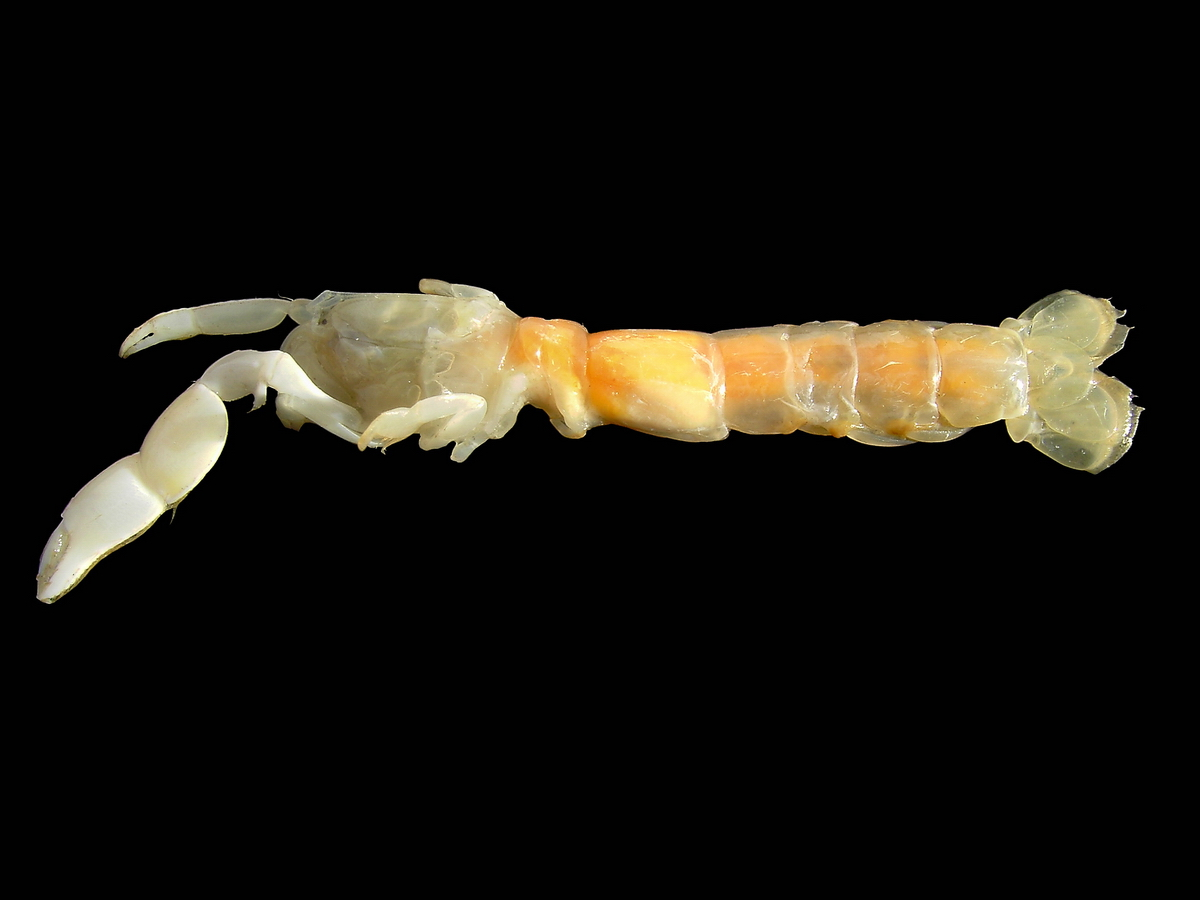
Pestarella tyrrhena (Axiidea: Callianassidae)

Thalassinidea is the former infraorder classification of decapod crustaceans that live in burrows in muddy bottoms of the world's oceans. In Australian English, the littoral thalassinidean Trypaea australiensis is referred to as the yabby (a term which also refers to freshwater crayfish of the genus Cherax), frequently used as bait for estuarine fishing; elsewhere, however, they are poorly known, and as such have few vernacular names, "mud lobster" and "ghost shrimp" counting among them. The burrows made by thalassinideans are frequently preserved, and the fossil record of thalassinideans reaches back to the late Jurassic.

The group was abandoned when it became clear that it represented two separate lineages, now both recognised as infraorders: Gebiidea and Axiidea. Recent molecular analyses have shown that thalassinideans are most closely related to Brachyura (crabs) and Anomura (hermit crabs and their allies). There are believed to be 556 extant species of thalassinideans in 96 genera, with the greatest diversity in the tropics, although with some species reaching latitudes above 60° north. About 95% of species live in shallow water, with only three taxa living below 2,000 metres (6,600 ft).

== See also ==
- Thalassinoides
