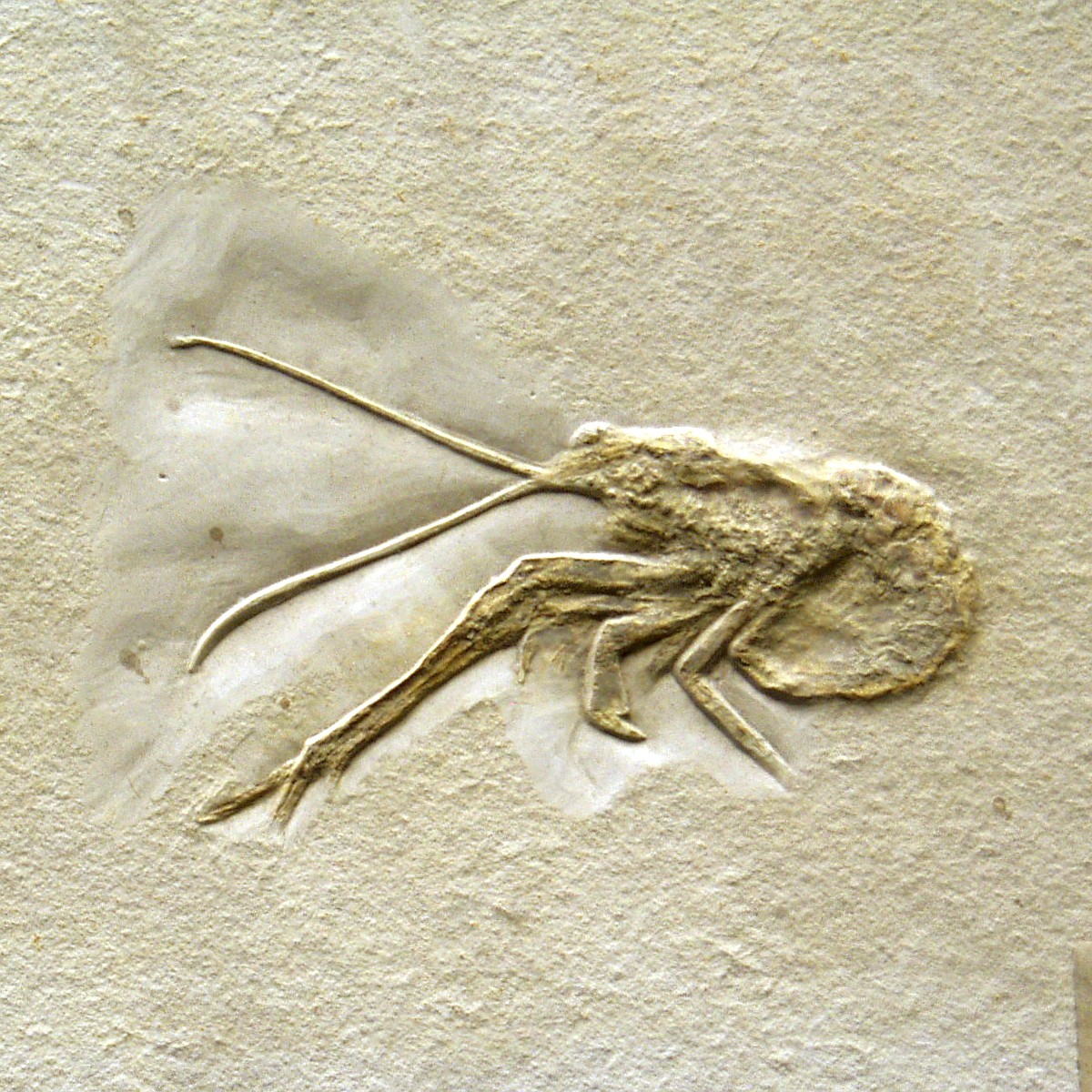
- fossil Mecochirus longimanatus

Scientific classification
- Kingdom: Animalia
- Phylum: Arthropoda
- Class: Malacostraca
- Order: Decapoda
- Suborder: Pleocyemata
- Clade: Reptantia
- Infraorder: Glypheidea; Winckler, 1882

Superfamilies
- Glypheoidea Winckler, 1882; †Erymoidea Van Straelen, 1924

= Glypheidea =

Glypheidea Temporal range: Early Triassic–Recent

Infraorder of crustaceans

Glypheidea is an infraorder of lobster-like decapod crustaceans, comprising a number of fossil forms and the two extant (living) genera Neoglyphea and Laurentaeglyphea: The infraorder was thought to be extinct until a living species, Neoglyphea inopinata, was discovered in 1975. They are now considered "living fossils", with over 256 fossil species discovered, and just two extant species.

== Phylogeny ==
Glypheidea belongs to the clade Reptantia within the order Decapoda, although its exact placement within Reptantia is difficult to determine. Some phylogenetic studies consider Glypheidea to be most closely related to the infraorder Astacidea, which consists of the lobsters and crayfish, whereas other studies instead consider Glypheidea to be more closely related to the infraorder Polychelida, a group of deep-sea blind lobsters.

== Taxonomy ==
Glypheoidea Winckler, 1882

- † Chimaerastacidae Amati, Feldmann & Zonneveld, 2004
  - † Chimaerastacus Amati, Feldmann & Zonneveld, 2004
- Glypheidae Winckler, 1882
  - † Cedrillosia Garassino, Artal & Pasini, 2009
  - † Glyphea von Meyer, 1835
  - Laurentaeglyphea Forest, 2006
  - Neoglyphea Forest & de Saint Laurent, 1975
  - † Squamosoglyphea Beurlen, 1930
  - † Trachysoma Bell, 1858
- †Litogastridae Karasawa, 2013
  - †Lissocardia von Meyer, 1851 (= Piratella Assmann, 1927)
  - †Litogaster von Meyer, 1847
  - †Paralitogaster Glaessner, 1969
  - †Pseudoglyphea Oppel, 1861
  - †Tridactylastacus Feldmann et al., 2012
- † Mecochiridae Van Straelen, 1924
  - † Huhatanka Feldmann & West, 1978
  - † Jabaloya Garassino, Artal & Pasini, 2009
  - † Mecochirus Germar, 1827
  - † Meyeria M'Coy, 1849
  - † Praeatya Woodward, 1869
  - † Selenisca von Meyer, 1847
- † Platychelidae Glaessner, 1969
  - † Platychela Glaessner, 1931
  - † Platypleon Van Straelen, 1936

† Erymoidea Van Straelen, 1924

- † Erymidae Van Straelen, 1924
  - † Clytiella Glaessner, 1931
  - † Clytiopsis Bill, 1914
  - † Enoploclytia M'Coy, 1849
  - † Eryma von Meyer, 1840
  - † Galicia Garassino & Krobicki, 2002
  - † Palaeastacus Bell, 1850
  - † Paraclytiopsis Oravec, 1962
  - † Protoclytiopsis Birshtein, 1958
  - † Pustulina Quenstedt, 1857
  - † Stenodactylina Beurlen, 1928
- † Pemphicidae Van Straelen, 1928
  - † Pemphix Meyer, 1840
  - † Pseudopemphix Wüst, 1903
  - † Oosterinkia Klompmaker and Fraaije, 2011

† Glaessnericaroidea Karasawa, Schweitzer & Feldmann, 2013

- † Glaessnericaridae Karasawa, Schweitzer & Feldmann, 2013
  - † Glaessnericaris Garassino & Teruzzi, 1993
