= Nicothoe tumulosa =

Scientific classification
- Domain: Eukaryota
- Kingdom: Animalia
- Phylum: Arthropoda
- Class: Copepoda
- Order: Siphonostomatoida
- Family: Nicothoidae
- Genus: Nicothoe
- Species: N. tumulosa

Binomial name
- Nicothoe tumulosa Cressey, 1976

Species of Maxillopoda

Nicothoe tumulosa is a species of copepod parasitic on the gills of the glypheoid lobster Neoglyphea inopinata. It was described as a new species in 1976 by Roger F. Cressey. It can be differentiated from related species by the setal formula, and the trunk's covering of small bumps, which give the species its name.

== Discovery ==
A damaged decapod was collected in 1908 by the USFC Albatross in the Philippines. It was deposited in the United States National Museum, where it remained unidentified until Michèle de Saint Laurent examined it in 1975. Her colleague Jacques Forest recognised that it represented the first known extant species of the infraorder Glypheidea, which was thought to have been extinct since the Eocene, a conclusion endorsed by Fenner A. Chace, Jr. and Raymond B. Manning.

Parasitic copepods were discovered on the gills of the Neoglyphea specimen, and were described in a 1976 paper by Roger F. Cressey. Five specimens were examined, all female, and all but one adults. The specific epithet tumulosa is from the Latin meaning "full of mounds", referring to the surface texture of the animal's back. N. tumulosa is the only species in the genus to parasitise animals other than clawed lobsters of the family Nephropidae (Homarus gammarus and species of Metanephrops).

== Description ==
The body of Nicothoe tumulosa is up to 1.24 millimetres (0.049 in) long, and up to 0.59 mm (0.023 in) wide. The preserved specimens are purple in colour. Most of the dorsal aspect is covered by three large plates; remaining areas of the trunk are covered with "small sclerotised bumps". N. tumulosa differs from other related species by the numbers of setae on its legs, and by the surface texture of the trunk.

Females bear large egg sacs, similar to those in other copepod species, and each containing 50–60 eggs; the males are unknown.
