= Jacforus =

Scientific classification
- Domain: Eukaryota
- Kingdom: Animalia
- Phylum: Arthropoda
- Class: Malacostraca
- Order: Decapoda
- Suborder: Pleocyemata
- Infraorder: Brachyura
- Family: Xanthidae
- Subfamily: Euxanthinae
- Genus: Jacforus; Ng & Clark, 2003
- Species: J. cavatus

Binomial name
- Jacforus cavatus (Rathbun, 1907)

Synonyms
- Cycloxanthops cavatus Rathbun, 1907; Euxanthus minutus Edmondson, 1925; Megametope sulcatus Edmondson, 1931; Cycloxanthops cavata (Rathbun, 1907); Neoxanthops cavata (Rathbun, 1907)

Genus of crabs

Jacforus cavatus is a species of crab in the monotypic genus Jacforus in the family Xanthidae.

== Description ==
Jacforus is a small crab, with a carapace around 5 millimetres (0.20 in) long and 7 mm (0.28 in) wide.

== Distribution ==
Jacforus cavatus has a wide distribution in the tropical Indo-Pacific, ranging from Kenya to Australia, Japan and Hawaii.

== Taxonomy ==
Jacforus cavatus was first described by Mary J. Rathbun in 1907 as Cycloxanthus cavatus. It was described again by Charles Howard Edmondson in 1925 as Euxanthus minutus, and again by Edmondson in 1931 as Megametope sulcatus, both of which are junior subjective (heterotypic) synonyms. The affinites of Rathbun's species with other genera have also been unclear; its apparent affinities with the genus Medaeus are superficial. When Danièle Guinot split the genus Cycloxanthops in 1968, creating the new genus Neoxanthops, C. cavatus was not explicitly placed in either genus. A new genus, Jacforus, was erected in 2003, commemorating Jacques Forest, and containing only J. cavatus.
