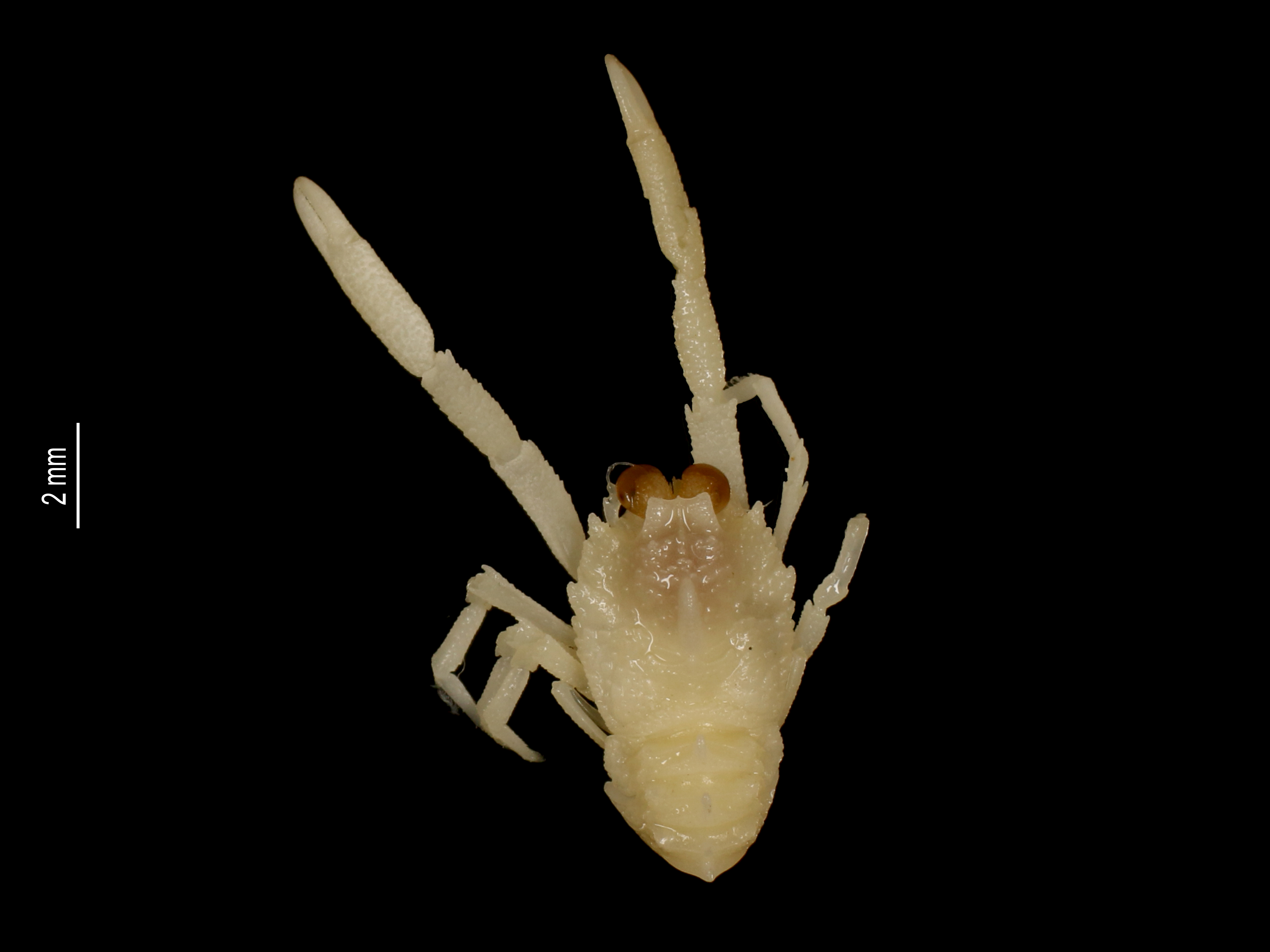
- Heteronida clivicola

Scientific classification
- Kingdom: Animalia
- Phylum: Arthropoda
- Clade: Pancrustacea
- Class: Malacostraca
- Order: Decapoda
- Suborder: Pleocyemata
- Infraorder: Anomura
- Family: Munididae
- Genus: Heteronida; Baba & de Saint Laurent, 1996

= Heteronida =

Genus of crustaceans

Heteronida is a genus of squat lobsters in the family Munididae. They occur in the western Pacific Ocean.

== Species ==
There are four recognized species:

- Heteronida aspinirostris (Khodkina, 1981)
- Heteronida barunae Baba & de Saint Laurent, 1996
- Heteronida ceres Macpherson, Rodriguez-Flores & Machordom, 2023
- Heteronida clivicola Macpherson & Baba, 2006
