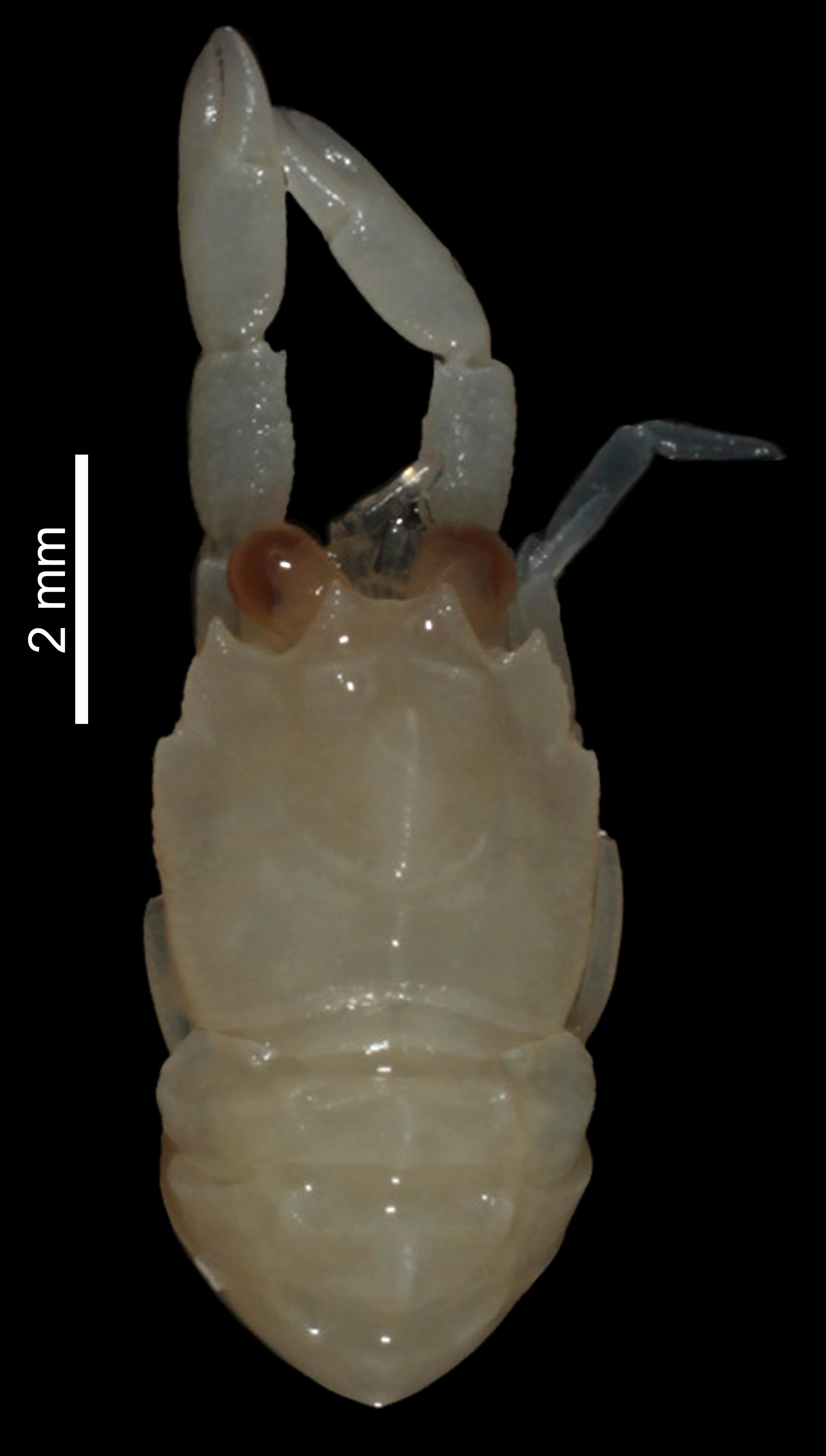

Scientific classification
- Kingdom: Animalia
- Phylum: Arthropoda
- Clade: Pancrustacea
- Class: Malacostraca
- Order: Decapoda
- Suborder: Pleocyemata
- Infraorder: Anomura
- Family: Munididae
- Genus: Heteronida
- Species: H. barunae

Binomial name
- Heteronida barunae Baba & de Saint Laurent, 1996

= Heteronida barunae =

Species of crustacean

Heteronida barunae is a species of squat lobster in the family Munididae. It is named for the research vessel Baruna Jaya I. The males usually measure between 2.2 and 2.8 millimetres (0.087 and 0.110 in). It is found off Indonesia and the Kei Islands, at depths between about 205 and 425 metres (673 and 1,394 ft).
