= Forestia =

Forestia may refer to:

- Forestia (crab), a genus of crabs in the family Xanthidae
- Forestia (video game), a 1998 edutainment video game
