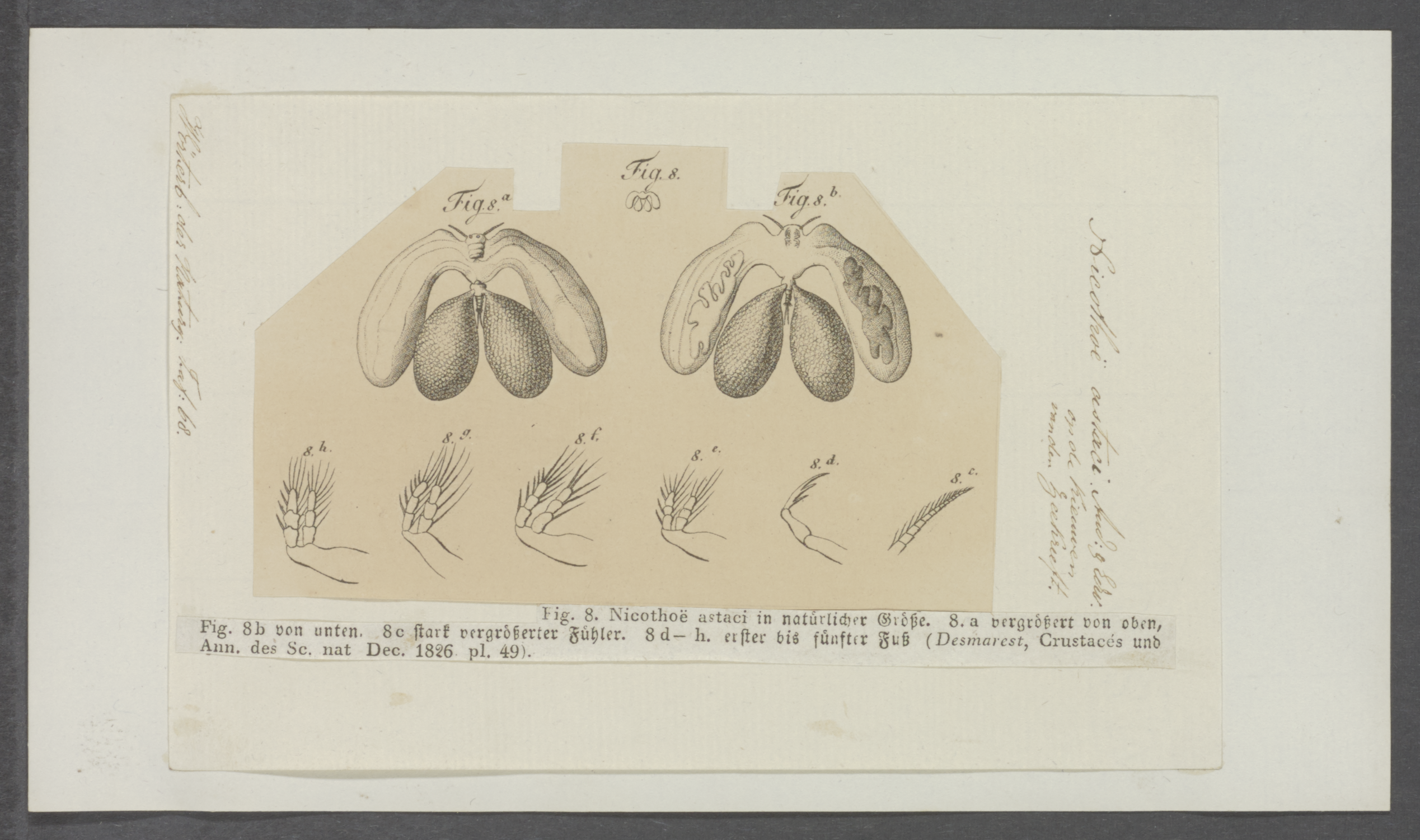
- A picture of Nicothoë astaci

Scientific classification
- Kingdom: Animalia
- Phylum: Arthropoda
- Class: Copepoda
- Order: Siphonostomatoida
- Family: Nicothoidae
- Genus: Nicothoe
- Species: N. astaci

Binomial name
- Nicothoe astaci Audouin & H. Milne-Edwards, 1826

= Nicothoe astaci =

Species of parasitic crustacean

Nicothoë astaci or the 'lobster louse' is an ectoparasitic copepod that parasitises the gills of the European lobster species Homarus gammarus. The lobster louse was first reported in 1826 by Audoin & Milne-Edwards. N. astaci has been found on lobsters inhabiting locations including Scotland, Lundy Island in the Bristol Channel and as far south as France and Portugal. The louse possesses a narrow suctorial mouthpart to feed on host haemolymph. Internally, In its adult form, Nicothoe is barely mobile and most likely remains in the same position for most of its life. The parasite occurs in groups, particularly near the base of the gills, and study has gone into its effects on the lobsters, which are considerably important, commercially. Not much is known about its life cycle, since there are significant gaps in knowledge of certain stages of its growth.

== Description ==
=== Female ===
The adult female consists of three parts, the cephalothorax, a thorax bearing two large lateral expansions or wings, and the abdomen which is responsible for carrying two oval egg-sacs. The female Nicothoe astaci abdomen tip measures 1.2–1.3 millimetres (0.047–0.051 in), and each wing measures 4 mm (0.16 in) long. The eggs sacs that are located in the abdomen measure up to 3 mm (0.12 in) in length. The head is fused to the first two segments, three other segments are visible dorsoventrally by three rings and are important in the formation of the wings. The wings interact with the posterior edge and the sixth thoracic segment which is fused to the first abdominal segment.

The adult female has a complete set of segments and limbs, and is considered to be a modification of, rather than a degeneration from its usual copepod form.

=== Male ===
The female Nicothoe astaci is the only individual to be definitely recognised, described and figured by scientists. Some female specimens have been studied and placed under the category of a male but have been traced to not be in the species. However, many wingless specimens have been found and observed in the lab to be analyzed. Specimens having full complement segments were described to be sexually mature males. Males and females at the larval stage either develop wings or stay wingless. The males mature without wings and the females become sexually mature with wings. Furthermore, several specimens have been studied in various stages of development and have been found to contain testes in the thorax and genital segment. The development of males occurs as cyclopids during the gap in the life history between cyclopid and last copepod stages. Male Nicothoe astaci do not settle on the lobster while females are present on the lobster during their final stage.

== Life cycle ==
Nicothoe larvae are released from the egg-sacs into surrounding water. These are cyclopid larvae. The morphology of a first-stage larva includes full mouthparts, two pairs and rudimentary third pair of legs, and a sucking mouth tube. The cephalothorax is as long as the rest of the body and some legs are free. There is a gap in knowledge of the life cycle of this parasite. It is unknown if this species requires any intermediate hosts; the earliest stage of Nicothoe seen on lobster gills was a last-stage copepodid. This last stage resembles the adult except for the absence of wings and egg-sacs. Growth continues, with a whole succession of juvenile stages, at which wings and gonads develop. Once the wings have reached a length of 2.0–2.2 mm (0.079–0.087 in), eggs are forced out of the gonads into egg-sacs and it is at which the organism becomes an adult.

The series of changes in the reproductive system of the juvenile and adult Nicothoe are divided into six stages:

- Immature – No development of ovaries are externally visible in juvenile; adult ovaries are empty or with few residual eggs.
- Egg-sacs contain spherical eggs.
- Developing – Ovaries become externally visible as granular with no definite oocytes visible. Larvae are in egg-sacs.
- Half-full – Ovaries are darker with oocytes externally visible. Young oocytes and dividing oogonia can be seen. Larvae in egg-sacs are showing signs of segmentation.
- Full – Ovaries are large and full with plots of oognia and oocytes (few are young). Larvae are showing rudimentary limbs.
- Ripe – Ovaries appear dense. Eggs are closely packed together and showing signs of maturation. Egg-sacs are full of cyclopid larvae with mouthparts and swimming legs. Fertilization by sperm occurs before the eggs enter the egg-sacs and the development into embryos happens once the egg-sacs are full of eggs. At this point, the ovaries have already begun forming new eggs.
- Spawning – Old egg-sacs are lost and larvae are released. New egg-sacs are being formed and the cycle is repeated.

== Feeding mechanism ==
The feeding mechanism of the female Nicothoe astaci has been studied extensively. The parasite feeds upon the haemolymph (blood) of the lobster by attaching to the gill filament using its circular ('oral disc') mouthparts and limbs. Recent cryo-scanning electron microscopy has revealed structural adaptations that facilitate attachment of these parasites to the gill filaments of their lobster host. It is thought that sharp mandibles pierce the wall of the gill filament before the suctorial oral disc attaches to the gill, which in conjunction with an observed peristaltic mechanism of the stomach, ensures a ‘vacuum seal’ to the host, extracting haemolymph to be ingested. The aperture of the feeding channel, through which host haemolymph is drawn, is only approximately 5 micrometers in diameter.

== Host response ==
The effect of Nicothoe astaci upon the host European lobster has only recently been studied. Internally, lobsters respond to the parasite by encapsulating haemocytes in an attempt to partition off damaged gill areas, and Wootton et al. (2011) hypothesized that this response may impair gill respiratory function. Various haemolymph factors can provide a general health indicator of crustaceans. For example, haemolymph levels of hyperglycaemic hormone, proteins, haemocyanin levels, nitrogenous wastes (including ammonia, urea and uric acid) and glucose change in response to environmental stressors such as temperature, salinity and hypoxia, as well as to physiological stressors such as moult stage and exogenous stressors such as temperature, handling, disease and parasitization. The data suggest that lobsters with gills damaged by the feeding activities of N. astaci respond by producing higher levels of haemocyanin, which is both a key defence response and may compensate for their decreased respiratory functioning (i.e. to bolster the oxygen transport capability of haemolymph).

== Lobster moults ==
The most important moulting season of the lobster in Scottish waters occurs between May and August. Male lobster cast their exoskeleton every year while female cast their exoskeleton every other year. It is important for Nicothoe astaci to enter the gills while the exoskeleton is soft right after the moult. Any further hardening of the exoskeleton prevents female Nicothoe astaci from attaching to the gills. If the gills are soft, the parasite is able to pierce its mandibles on the gills to attach. This enables the female to feed on the host's blood which leads to the formation and growth of their wings.
