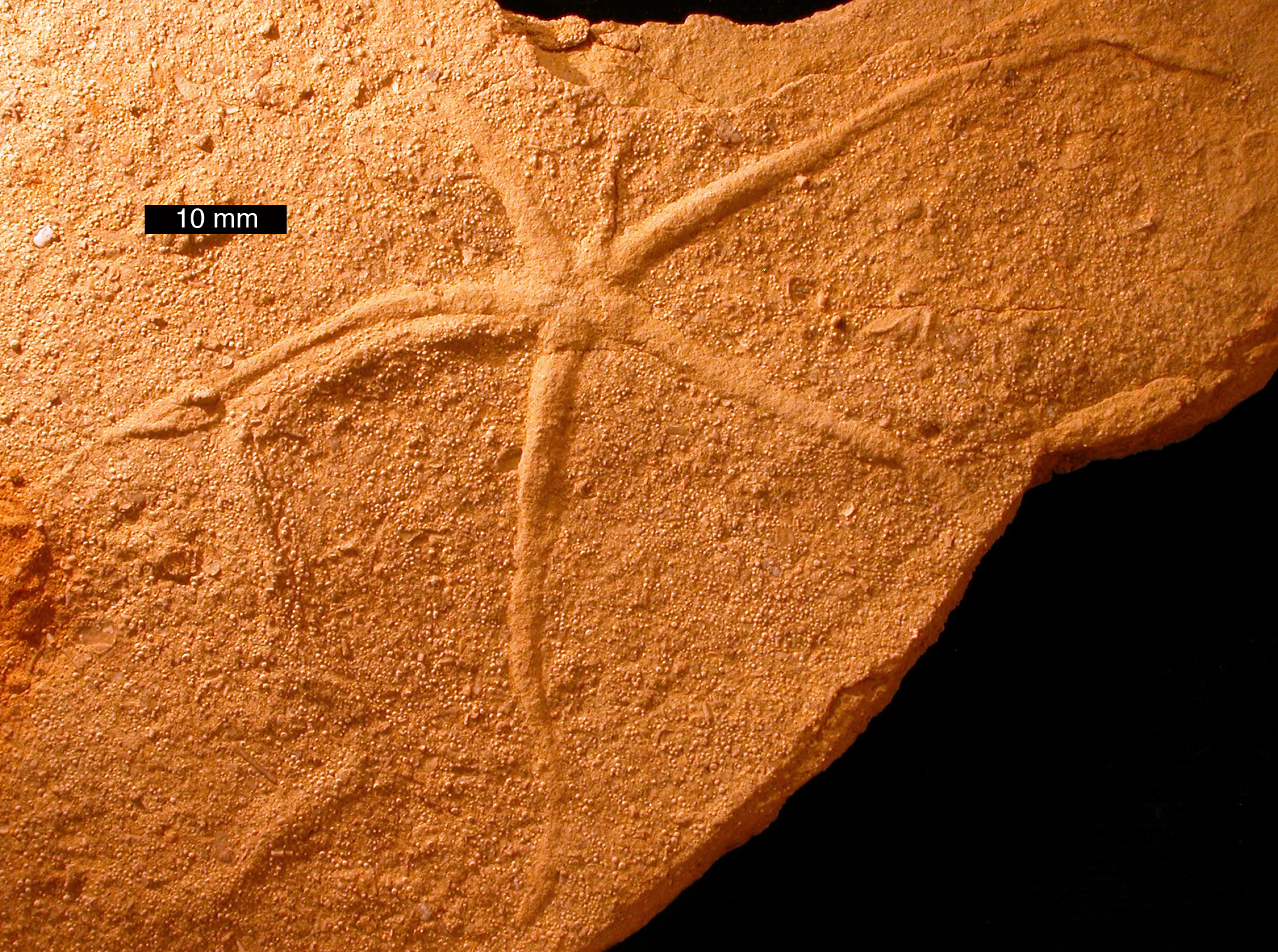
- Asteriacites lumbricalis, a trace fossil of an ophiuroid echinoderm; Carmel Formation (Middle Jurassic), near Gunlock, Utah

Trace fossil classification
- Ichnofamily: †Asteriacitidae
- Ichnogenus: †Asteriacites von Schlotheim, 1820

Ichnospecies
- †Asteriacites lumbricallis von Schlotheim, 1820; †Asteriacites stelliformis (Miller & Dyer, 1878) Osgood, 1970; †Asteriacites quinquefolius (Quenstedt, 1876) Seilacher, 1953

Synonyms
- Heliophycus Miller & Dyer, 1878; Spongaster Fritsch, 1908 non Ehrenberg, 1860

= Asteriacites =

Asteriacites Temporal range: Ordovician–Holocene

Star-like fossil imprints

Asteriacites is a type of five-rayed trace fossil found in marine sedimentary rocks. It records the burrows of ophiuroid and asteroid sea stars on the sea floor. Asteriacites is found in European and American rocks, from the Ordovician period onwards, and is especially numerous in the Triassic and Jurassic systems.

Dense assemblages of Asteriacites ('Asteriacites beds') are considered proxies for marine settings, low bioturbation intensity, shallow tiering, high sedimentation rate and/or event-bed deposition, significant levels of hydrodynamic energy, and low predation pressure.

== Gallery ==
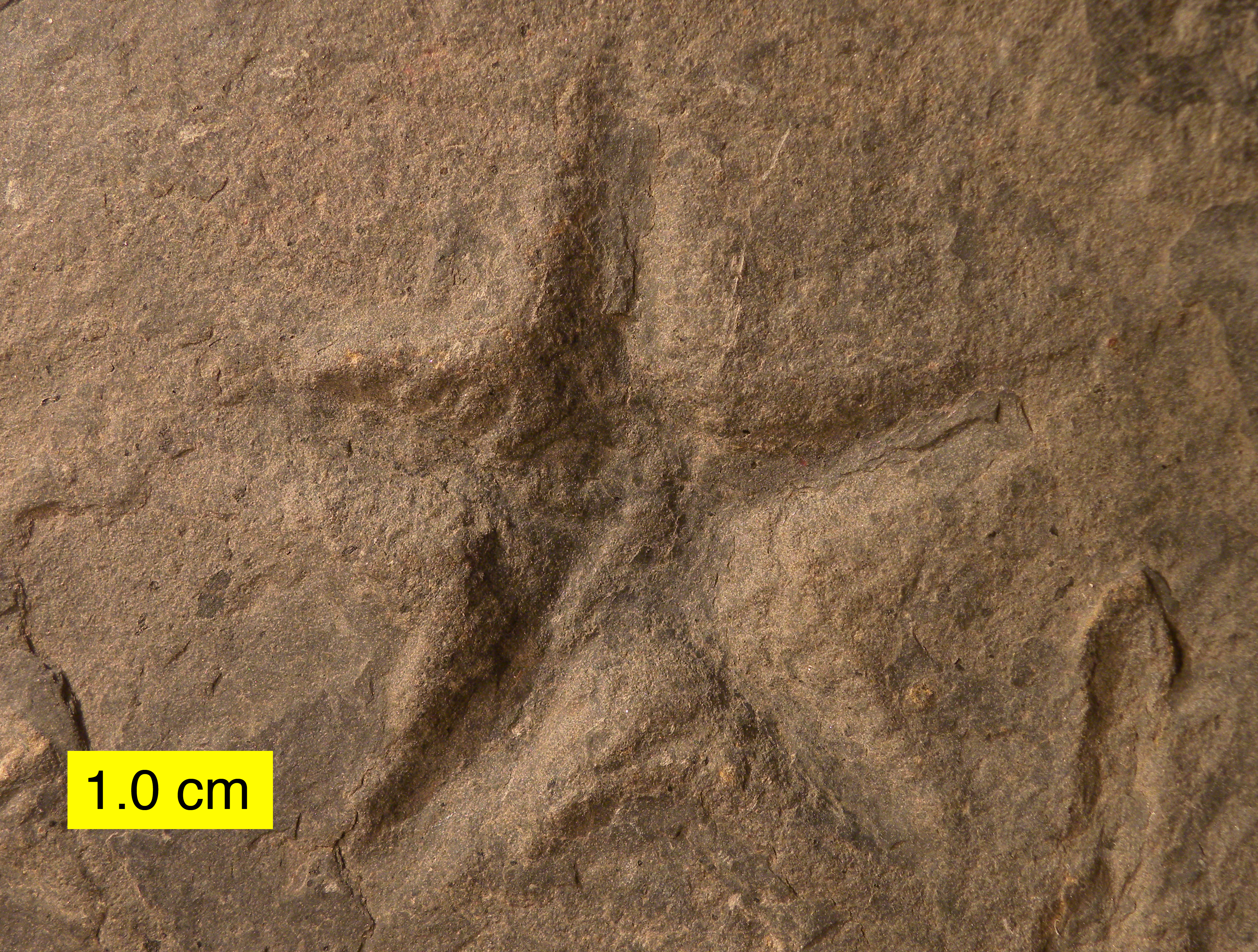
Asteriacites from the Devonian of northeastern Ohio; this trace was made by an asteroid echinoderm

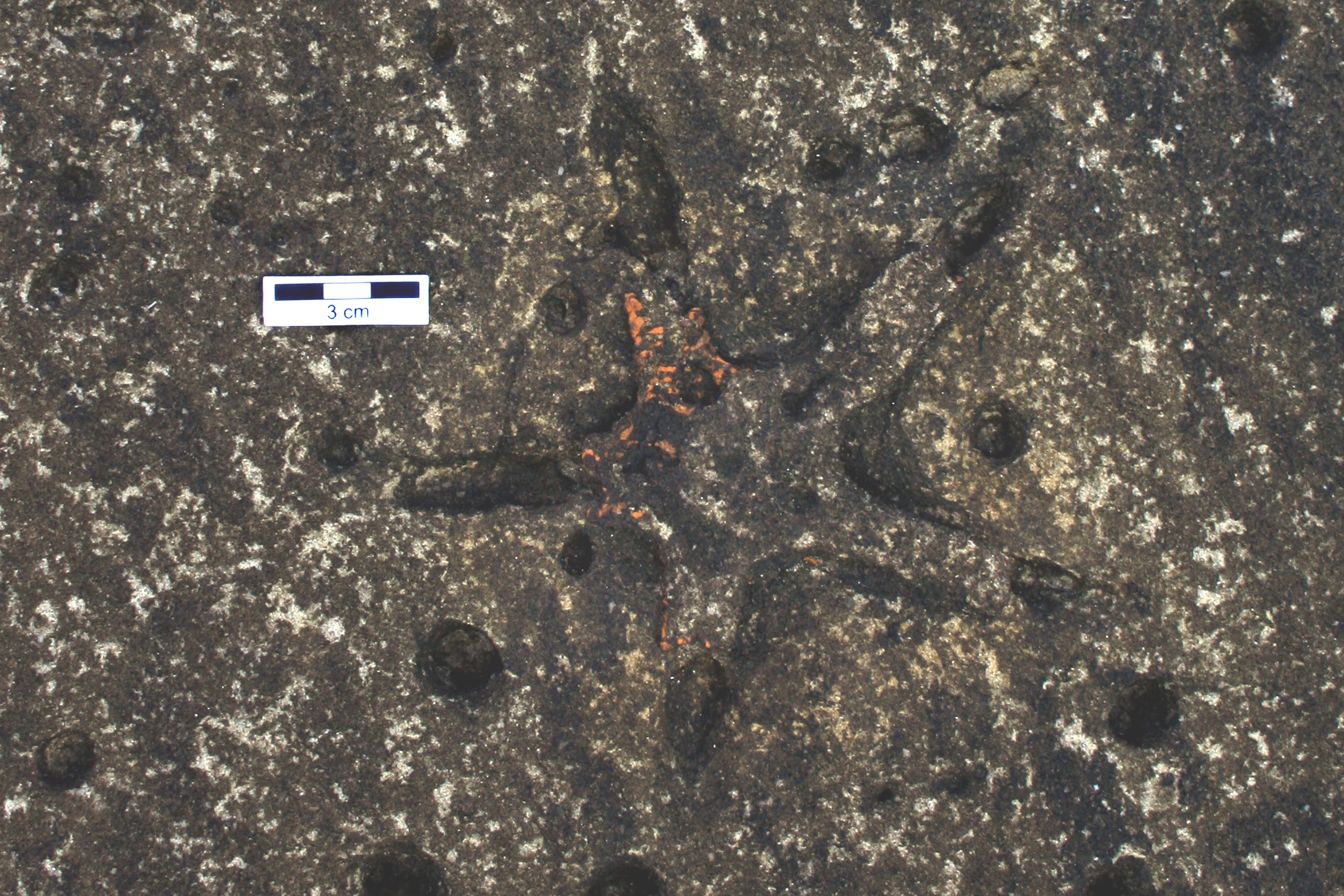
Bedding plane view of Asteriacites from the Snapper Point Formation (Permian), New South Wales
