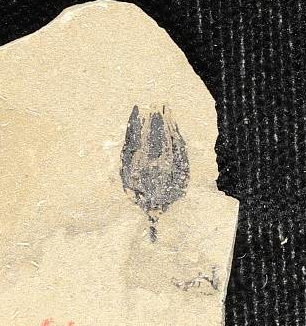
- Carpolithes caryophylloides holotype

Scientific classification
- Kingdom: Plantae
- Family: incertae sedis
- Genus: †Carpolithus

= Carpolithus =

Extinct species of fruit seeds

Carpolithus is a form taxon for fossilized seeds known from the fossil record.

== Etymology ==
The term Carpolithus derives from the Greek words karpos (καρπός), meaning "fruit," and lithos (λίθος), meaning "stone." It reflects the fossilized nature of the seeds and fruits classified under this genus.

== History and classification ==
The genus is classified as a form taxon and is extinct. The first fossils with "Carpolithus" traits appeared 359–347 million years ago in the Paleozoic Era, while the last were recorded between 0.13 and 0.01 million years ago in the Pleistocene epoch.

The concept of Carpolithus dates to the 18th century, as detailed in 1920 by Alfred Gabriel Nathorst, who revealed its first use by Swedish mineralogist Johan Gottschalk Wallerius in 1747. In 1750, Wallerius included early references to Carpolithus in his Mineralogie, oder mineralreich.

Years later, Carl Linnaeus referenced the genus in 1768. It was a generic name employed by Linnaeus for incorporating fossil fruits and seeds that could not be assigned to a natural plant group. Linnaeus referred to "Phytolithus fructus" as Carpolithus.

15 species were described as "Carpolithes" by Ernst Friedrich, Baron von Schlotheim in 1820. The term "Carpolites" was adopted by Kaspar Maria von Sternberg in 1825.

Early fossil genera like Carpolithus and Carpolithesserved as "form genera," which were catch-all categories to classify numerous unidentified fossil seeds, based on impressions, compressions, and casts, serving as a general repository. Since Carpolithus and Carpolithes were published before 31 December 1820, they are considered invalid under the 1966 International Code of Botanical Nomenclature.

== Species ==
There have been over 100 species assigned to Carpolithus.

- Carpolithus siliquarum
- Carpolithus quercinus
- Carpolithus caftanei
- Carpolithus conorum arborum
