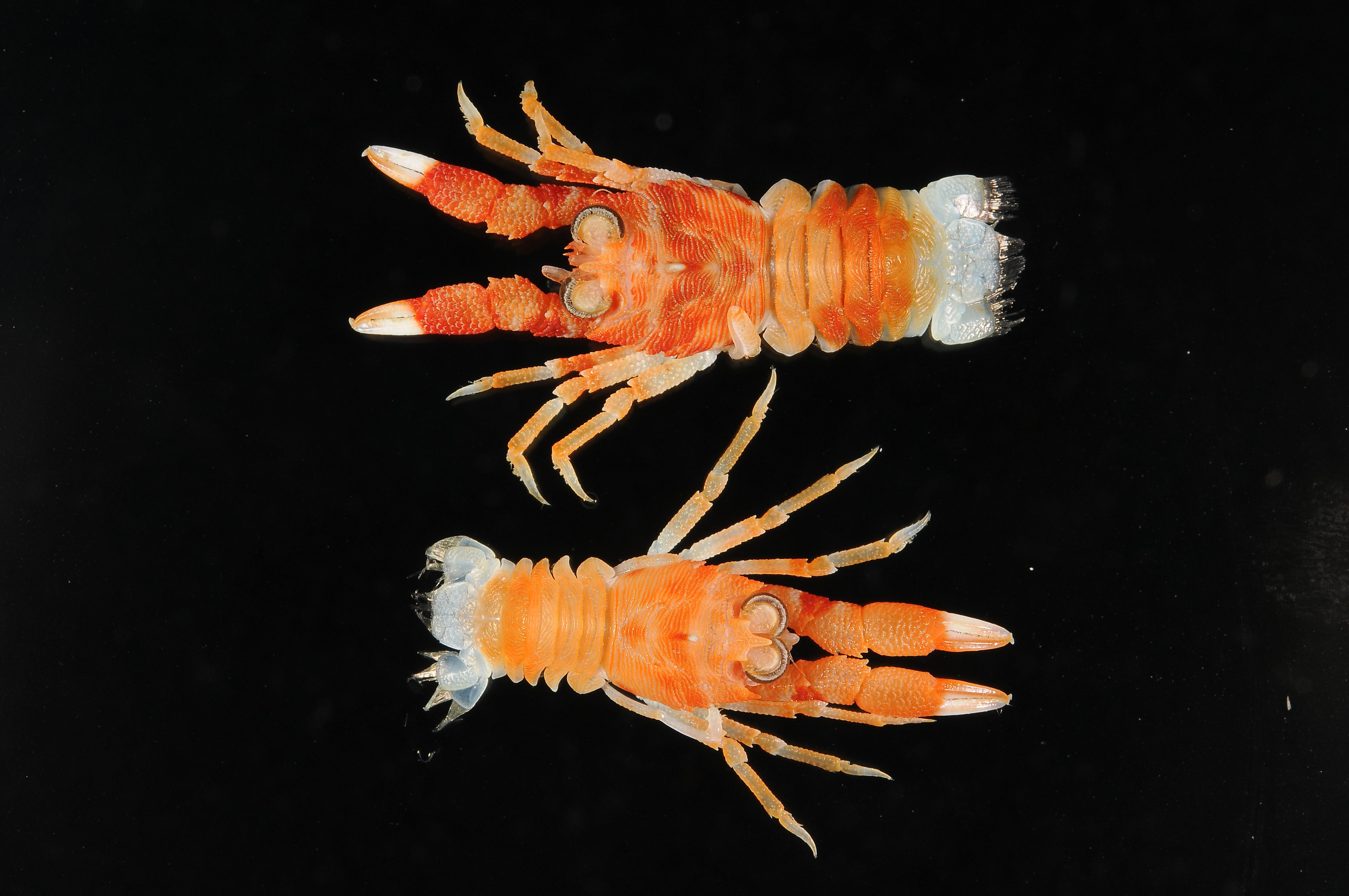

Scientific classification
- Domain: Eukaryota
- Kingdom: Animalia
- Phylum: Arthropoda
- Class: Malacostraca
- Order: Decapoda
- Suborder: Pleocyemata
- Infraorder: Anomura
- Family: Munididae
- Genus: Heteronida
- Species: H. aspinirostris

Binomial name
- Heteronida aspinirostris (Khodkina, 1981)

= Heteronida aspinirostris =

Species of crustacean

Heteronida aspinirostris is a species of squat lobster in the family Munididae. The males usually measure between 2.6 and 3.7 millimetres (0.10 and 0.15 in), with females measuring between 2.5 and 4.2 millimetres (0.098 and 0.165 in). It is found off of New Caledonia, Loyalty Islands, Vanuatu, and Chesterfield Islands, and near Norfolk Ridge, at depths between about 345 and 930 metres (1,132 and 3,051 ft).
