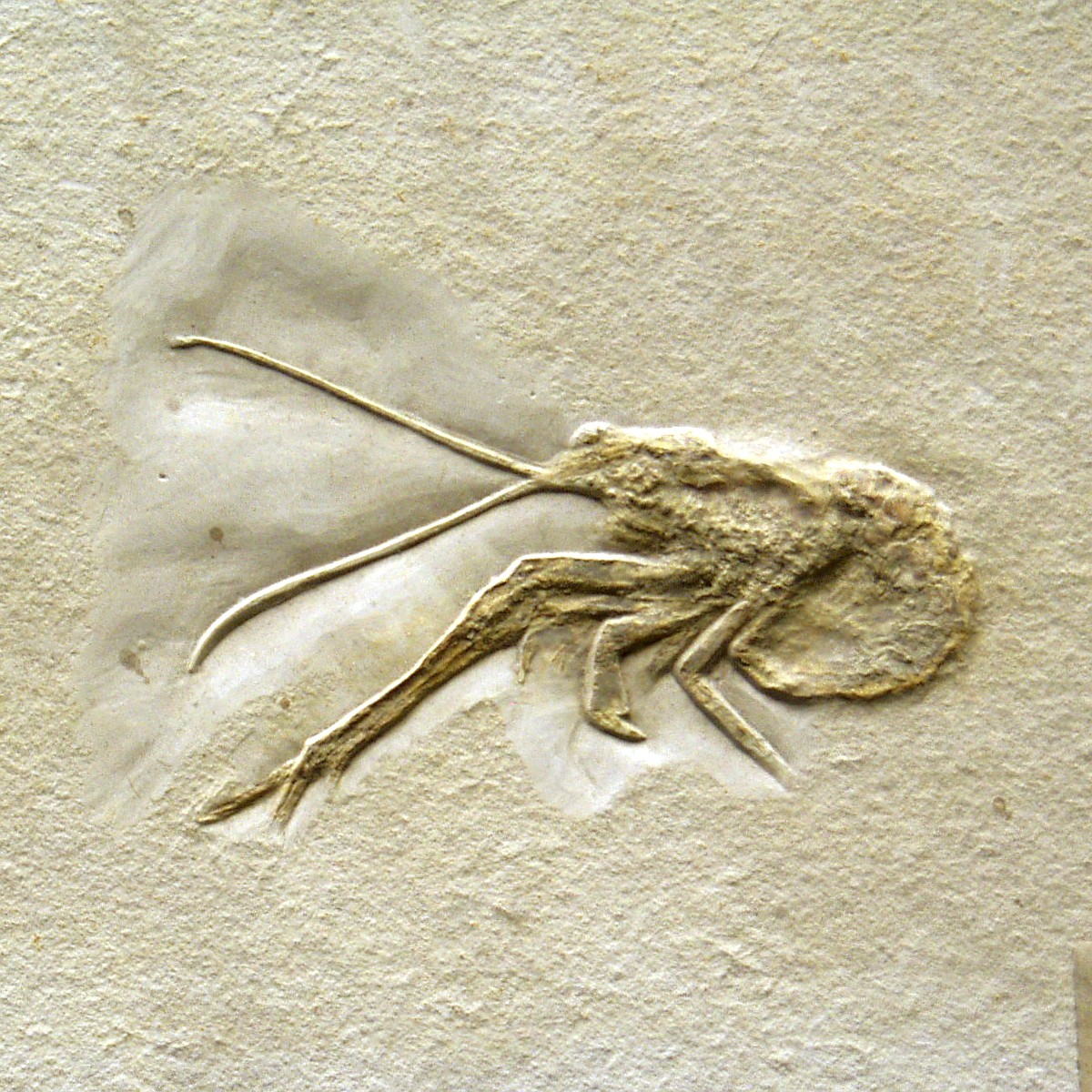
- Fossil from the Solnhofen limestones (Museum für Naturkunde, Berlin)

Scientific classification
- Domain: Eukaryota
- Kingdom: Animalia
- Phylum: Arthropoda
- Class: Malacostraca
- Order: Decapoda
- Suborder: Pleocyemata
- Family: †Mecochiridae
- Genus: †Mecochirus
- Species: †M. longimanatus

Binomial name
- †Mecochirus longimanatus Schlotheim, 1822

Synonyms
- Mecochirus longimanus

= Mecochirus longimanatus =

Mecochirus longimanatus Temporal range: Late Jurassic

Extinct species of crustacean

Mecochirus longimanatus is an extinct species of lobster-like decapod crustacean from the Jurassic of Europe.
