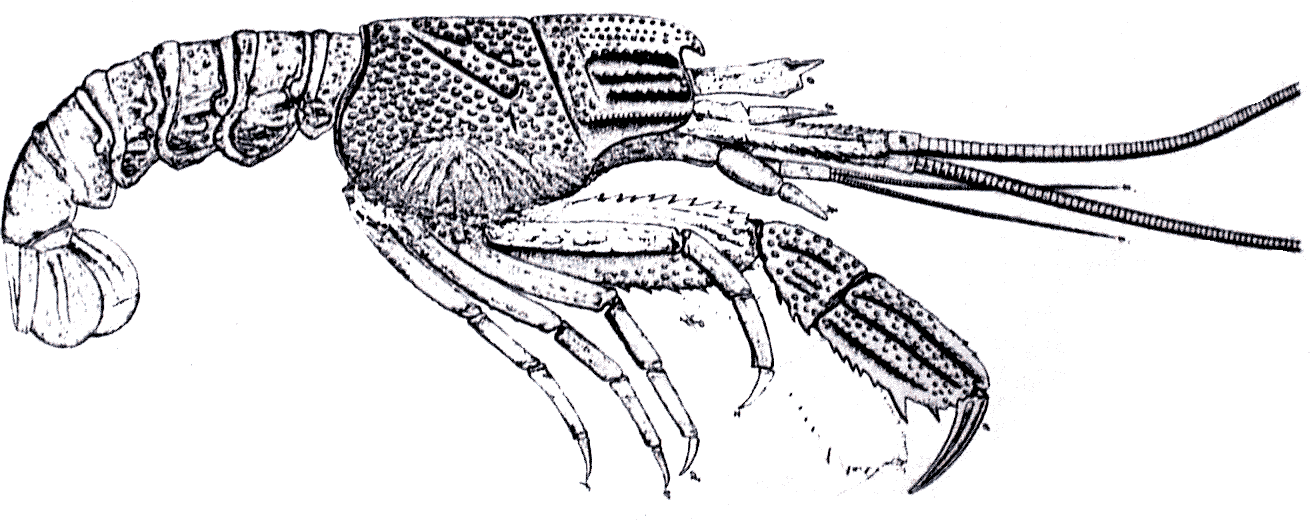
- Glyphea pseudastacus, Jurassic, Bavaria

Scientific classification
- Domain: Eukaryota
- Kingdom: Animalia
- Phylum: Arthropoda
- Class: Malacostraca
- Order: Decapoda
- Suborder: Pleocyemata
- Family: Glypheidae
- Genus: †Glyphea; Von Meyer, 1835

Type species
- Palinurus regleyanus Desmarest, 1822

= Glyphea =

Glyphea Temporal range: Jurassic–Eocene

Extinct genus of crustaceans

Glyphea is a genus of fossil glypheoid crustaceans that lived from the Jurassic to the Eocene. It includes the following species:

- Glyphea alexandri Taylor, 1979
- Glyphea arborinsularis Etheridge Jr., 1917
- Glyphea australensis Feldmann, Tshudy & Thomson, 1993
- Glyphea bathonica De Ferry, 1865
- Glyphea bohemica Fritsch, 1887
- Glyphea calloviensis H. Woods, 1927
- Glyphea carteri Bell, 1863
- Glyphea christeyi Feldmann & Maxwell, 1999
- Glyphea crassa Oppel, 1861
- Glyphea cretacea McCoy, 1854
- Glyphea damesi Garassino, 2000
- Glyphea foresti Feldmann & de Saint Laurent, 2002
- Glyphea franzini Breton, 2011
- Glyphea georgianus Taylor, 1979
- Glyphea gussmanni Schütze, 1907
- Glyphea jeletzkyi Feldmann & McPherson, 1980
- Glyphea liasina Von Meyer, 1840
- Glyphea lyrica Blake, 1876
- Glyphea muensteri (Voltz, 1835)
- Glyphea oculata J. Woods, 1957
- Glyphea prestwichi H. Woods, 1929
- Glyphea pseudastacus Schlotheim, 1822
- Glyphea pseudoscyllarus (Schlotheim, 1822)
- Glyphea regleyana (Desmarest, 1822)
- Glyphea reticulata Feldmann & Gazdzicki, 1997
- Glyphea robusta Feldmann & McPherson, 1980
- Glyphea rostrata (Phillips, 1829)
- Glyphea squamosa (Münster, 1839)
- Glyphea stilwelli Feldmann, 1993
- Glyphea tomesi Woodward, 1868
- Glyphea udressieri Von Meyer, 1840
- Glyphea vectensis H. Woods, 1927
- Glyphea willetti (Woodward, 1878)

== See also ==
- Neoglyphea and Laurentaeglyphea, the only extant glypheoids
