= Choniomyzon =

Scientific classification
- Domain: Eukaryota
- Kingdom: Animalia
- Phylum: Arthropoda
- Class: Copepoda
- Order: Siphonostomatoida
- Family: Nicothoidae
- Genus: Choniomyzon; Pillai, 1962

Genus of crustaceans

Choniomyzon is a genus of copepods, containing the following species: One species, C. inflatus, is a parasite of the eggs of the slipper lobster Ibacus novemdentatus.

- Choniomyzon inflatus Wakabayashi et al., 2013
- Choniomyzon libiniae Santos & Björnberg, 2004
- Choniomyzon panuiri Pillai, 1962
