= Nicothoe =

Scientific classification
- Domain: Eukaryota
- Kingdom: Animalia
- Phylum: Arthropoda
- Class: Copepoda
- Order: Siphonostomatoida
- Family: Nicothoidae
- Genus: Nicothoe; Audouin & H. Milne-Edwards, 1825

Genus of crustaceans

Nicothoe is a genus of copepods, containing the following species:

- Nicothoe analata Kabata, 1966
- Nicothoe astaci Audouin & Edwards, 1826
- Nicothoe brucei Kabata, 1967
- Nicothoe simplex Kabata, 1967
- Nicothoe tumulosa Cressey, 1976
