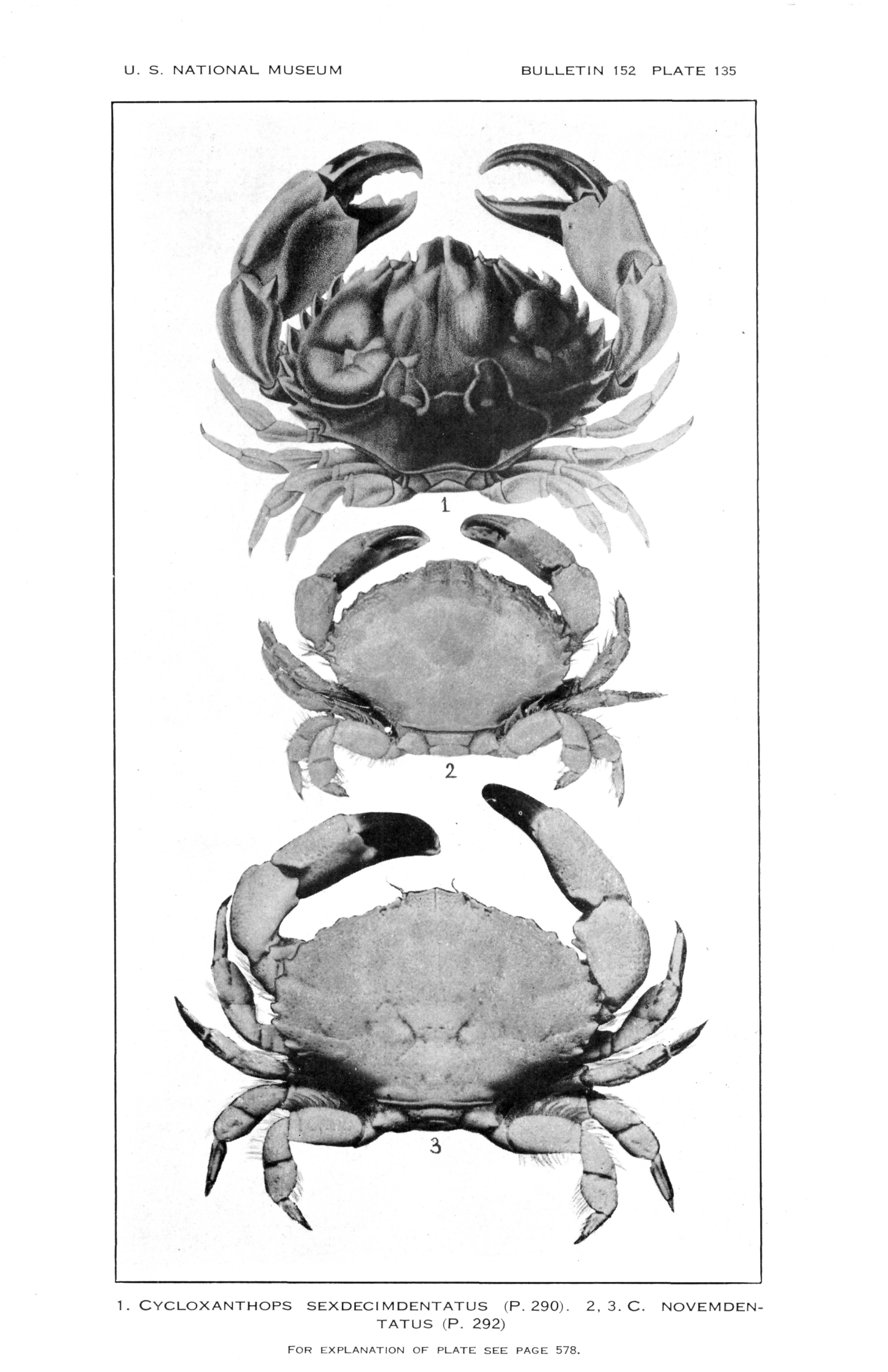
- Top: Cycloxanthops sexdecimdentatus, Middle and bottom: Cycloxanthops novemdentatus

Scientific classification
- Domain: Eukaryota
- Kingdom: Animalia
- Phylum: Arthropoda
- Class: Malacostraca
- Order: Decapoda
- Suborder: Pleocyemata
- Infraorder: Brachyura
- Family: Xanthidae
- Genus: Cycloxanthops
- Species: C. novemdentatus

Binomial name
- Cycloxanthops novemdentatus Lockington, 1877

Synonyms
- Xanthodes novemdentatus; Cycloxanthus californiensis; Cycloxanthus rugosa

= Cycloxanthops novemdentatus =

Species of crab

Cycloxanthops novemdentatus, commonly referred to as the ninetooth pebble crab, is a small crab in the family Xanthidae.

== Description ==
Cycloxanthops novemdentatus is typically brown or red in color, but can also be purple. Individuals of this species often have dark or light markings on their shell which are still present after molting, however, shell color may change over time. This organism gets its common name from the two sets of anterolateral teeth on the front edge of its carapace, each set consisting of nine teeth. The carapace can reach up to 3.75 inches in width.

Immature individuals can be distinguished from adults by the width of the third and sixth abdominal segments, the length of marginal abdominal hair, a sparse layer of hair on the swimmerets, and the presence of a structure known as a lock mechanism in males. After individuals reach approximately 6.5 mm in carapace width, sexual dimorphism is apparent due to the different size and shape of abdominal segments.

Cycloxanthops novemdentatus is the largest member of the family Xanthidae found in California.

== Distribution and habitat ==
Cycloxanthops novemdentatus can be found in the eastern Pacific Ocean, from Monterey, CA to Baja California, but is most abundant in the southernmost portions of coastal southern California.

Cycloxanthops novemdentatus lives in rocky intertidal and subtidal habitats to a depth of 240 m. Younger crabs are typically found in higher regions of the intertidal than adults.

== Ecology ==
=== Diet ===
Cycloxanthops novemdentatus has been observed cracking open and feeding upon purple sea urchins. It is also known to eat other crab species.

=== Defense ===
When threatened, C. novemdentatus may freeze in place. It is thought that this is an attempt to remain undetected.
