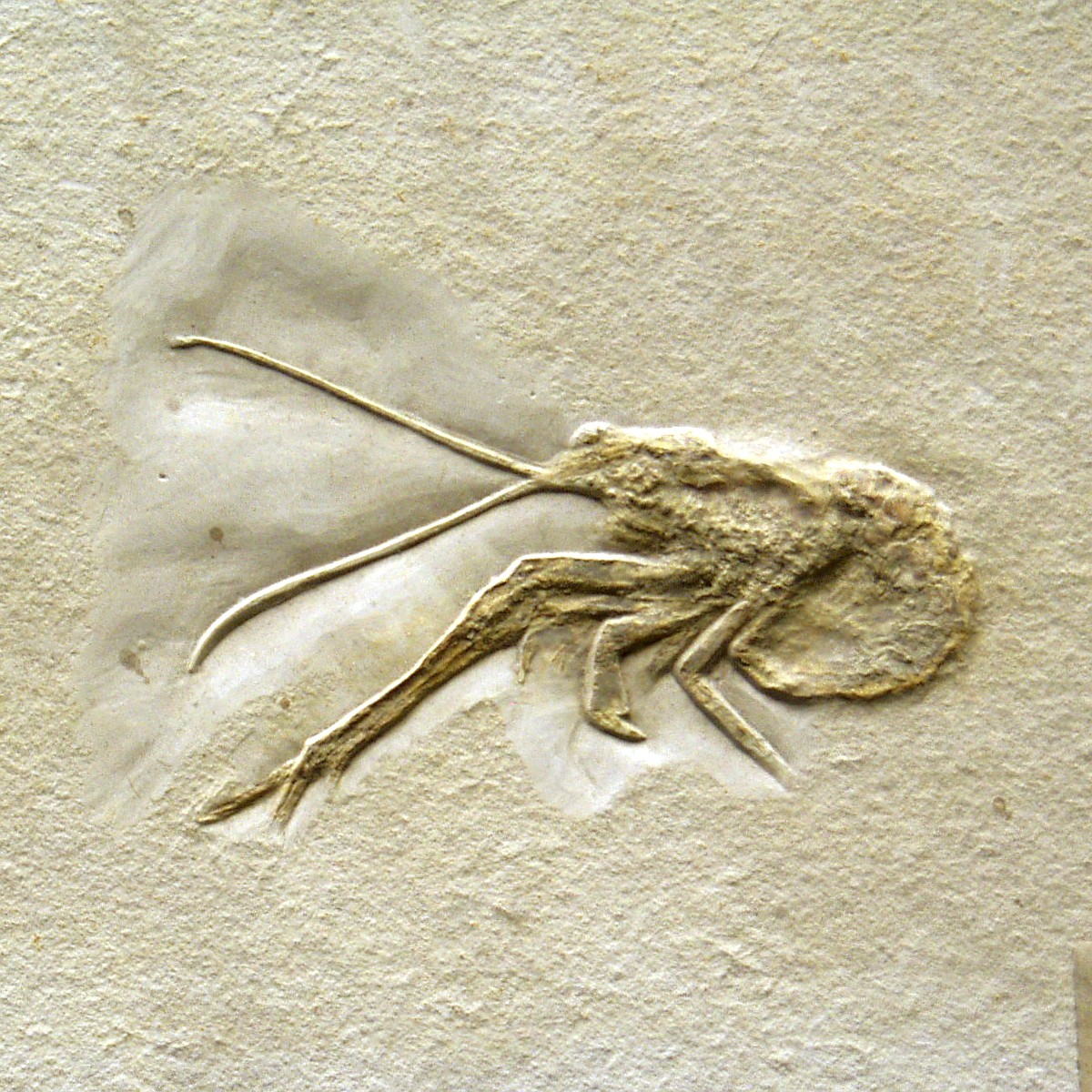
- Fossil of Mecochirus longimanatus, from the Solnhofen limestones

Scientific classification
- Domain: Eukaryota
- Kingdom: Animalia
- Phylum: Arthropoda
- Class: Malacostraca
- Order: Decapoda
- Suborder: Pleocyemata
- Family: †Mecochiridae
- Genus: †Mecochirus; Germar, 1827

Type species
- Mecochirus longimanatus Schlotheim, 1822

= Mecochirus =

Mecochirus Temporal range: Late Jurassic–Cenomanian

Extinct genus of crustaceans

Mecochirus is an extinct genus of lobster-like decapod crustaceans, containing 17 species. The Maxberg Specimen of Archaeopteryx was initially assigned to the type species, Mecochirus longimanatus before it was realised that it belonged to Archaeopteryx lithographica.

== Paleoecology ==
Mecochirus rapax may have lived inside or produced Thalassinoides burrows.
