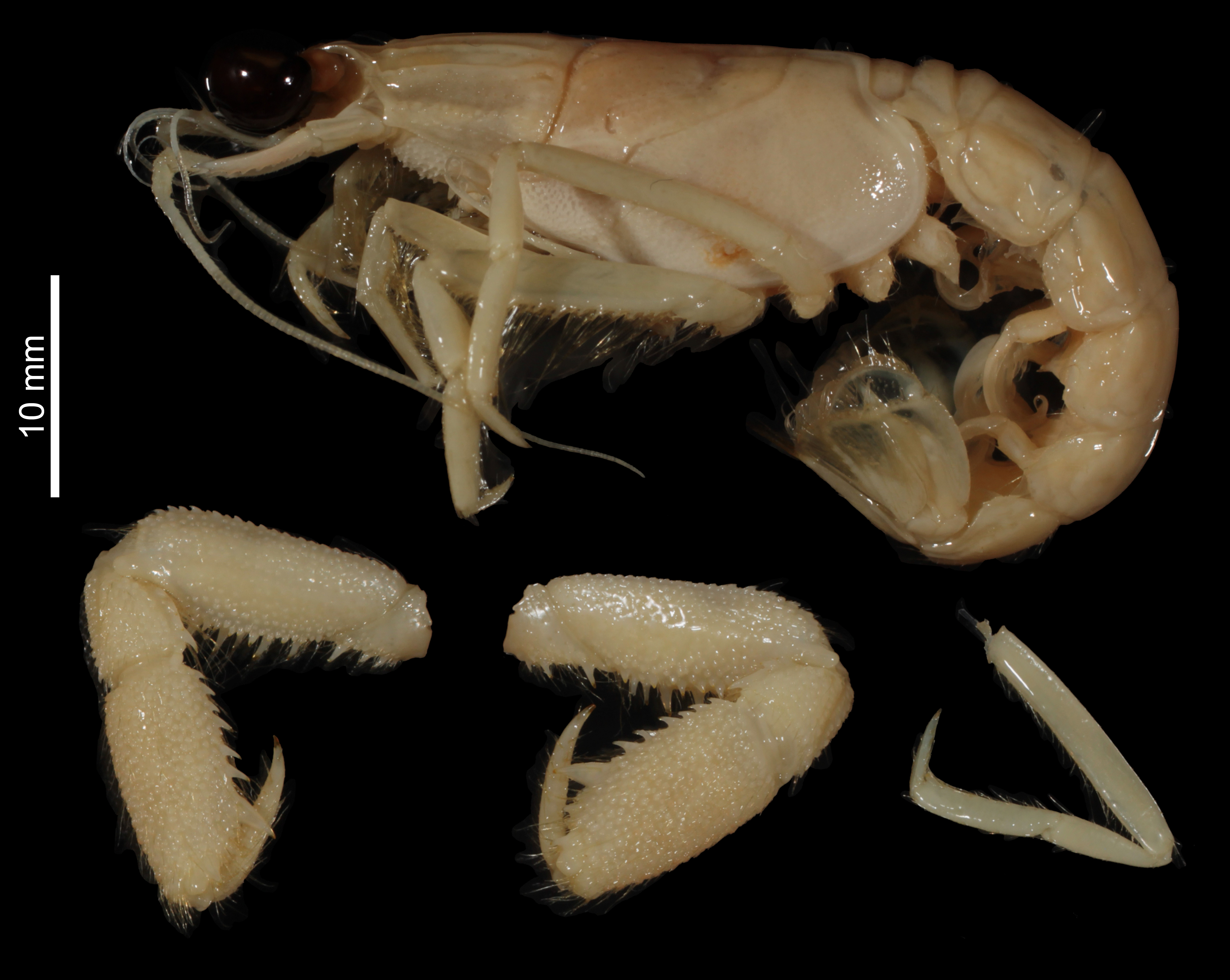

Conservation status
- Data Deficient (IUCN 3.1)

Scientific classification
- Domain: Eukaryota
- Kingdom: Animalia
- Phylum: Arthropoda
- Class: Malacostraca
- Order: Decapoda
- Suborder: Pleocyemata
- Family: Glypheidae
- Genus: Laurentaeglyphea; Forest, 2006
- Species: L. neocaledonica

Binomial name
- Laurentaeglyphea neocaledonica (Richer de Forges, 2006)

Synonyms
- Neoglyphea neocaledonica Richer de Forges, 2006

= Laurentaeglyphea =

Laurentaeglyphea neocaledonica

Genus of crustaceans

Laurentaeglyphea neocaledonica is a species of glypheoid lobster, and the only species in the genus Laurentaeglyphea. It is known from a single specimen collected on a guyot in the Coral Sea between Australia and New Caledonia. It is thought to be an active predator with colour vision, unlike its nearest living relative, Neoglyphea inopinata.

== Description ==
Laurentaeglyphea is known from a single adult female specimen, with a carapace 26.6 by 9 millimetres (1.05 in × 0.35 in) in size. In life, the animal is whitish and marked with red patches, especially on the abdomen and the distal segments of the first pereiopods; the markings are much fainter on the carapace.

Laurantaeglyphea has large reniform (kidney-shaped) eyes, more developed in the lower half than the upper. The epistome, behind the two pairs of antennae on the ventral side, is large, but considerably shorter than that of Neoglyphea. Laurantaeglyphea has five pairs of pereiopods, all without true chelae (claws).

== Distribution ==
The single known specimen of Laurentaeglyphea was collected at a depth of 367–536 metres (1,204–1,759 ft) on Banc Capel (Chesterfield Plateau; 24°45.70′S 159°42.13′E) in the Coral Sea.

== Ecology ==
The ecology of Laurentaeglyphea is very different from that of its closest living relative, Neoglyphea inopinata. Banc Capel is a guyot – a former atoll with steep sides and a flat top – and is swept by strong currents. There are no sandy or muddy substrates, the surface being occupied by rocks or gravel scree. It is dominated by sponges, including the genus Phloedictyon and gorgonians. Other decapods found in the same trawls including the slipper lobster Ibacus brucei, the crab Randallia and swimming crabs.

On the basis of its large eyes, Laurentaeglyphea is thought to be an active predator, perhaps one with similar hunting behaviour to that of stomatopods. The presence of patterned pigmentation on an animal that lives at a depth of around 400 m (1,300 ft) suggests that it does not live in a burrow. In the clear waters of the Coral Sea, sufficient light penetrates to these depths for a wide range of colours to be represented among the fauna. The eyes of Laurentaeglyphea are thought to be adapted to colour vision, even if it is biased towards the shorter wavelengths (blues and greens).

The collected specimen of Laurentaeglyphea was observed to be very active and aggressive, using its semichelate first pereiopods to attack.

== Taxonomy ==
Laurentaeglyphea neocaledonica was originally described by Bertrand Richer de Forges in 2006, on the basis of a single specimen (the holotype). He named the species Neoglyphea neocaledonica, where the specific epithet neocaledonica refers to New Caledonia, the nearest land to the site where the holotype was collected. Later that year, Jacques Forest erected the new genus Laurentaeglyphea for the new species, separating it from Neoglyphea inopinata, the only other species in the genus Neoglyphea. (Note: Although Forest had intended to publish the new genus name in an article in Comptes Rendus Biologies, companion papers in the journal Crustaceana had actually appeared first, where the name appeared without any description or diagnosis (i.e. as a nomen nudum).) The genus name Laurentaeglyphea commemorates Michèle de Saint Laurent, who had discovered and co-described the first Recent specimen of the infraorder Glypheidea.

The two species of living glypheids are considered "living fossils".
