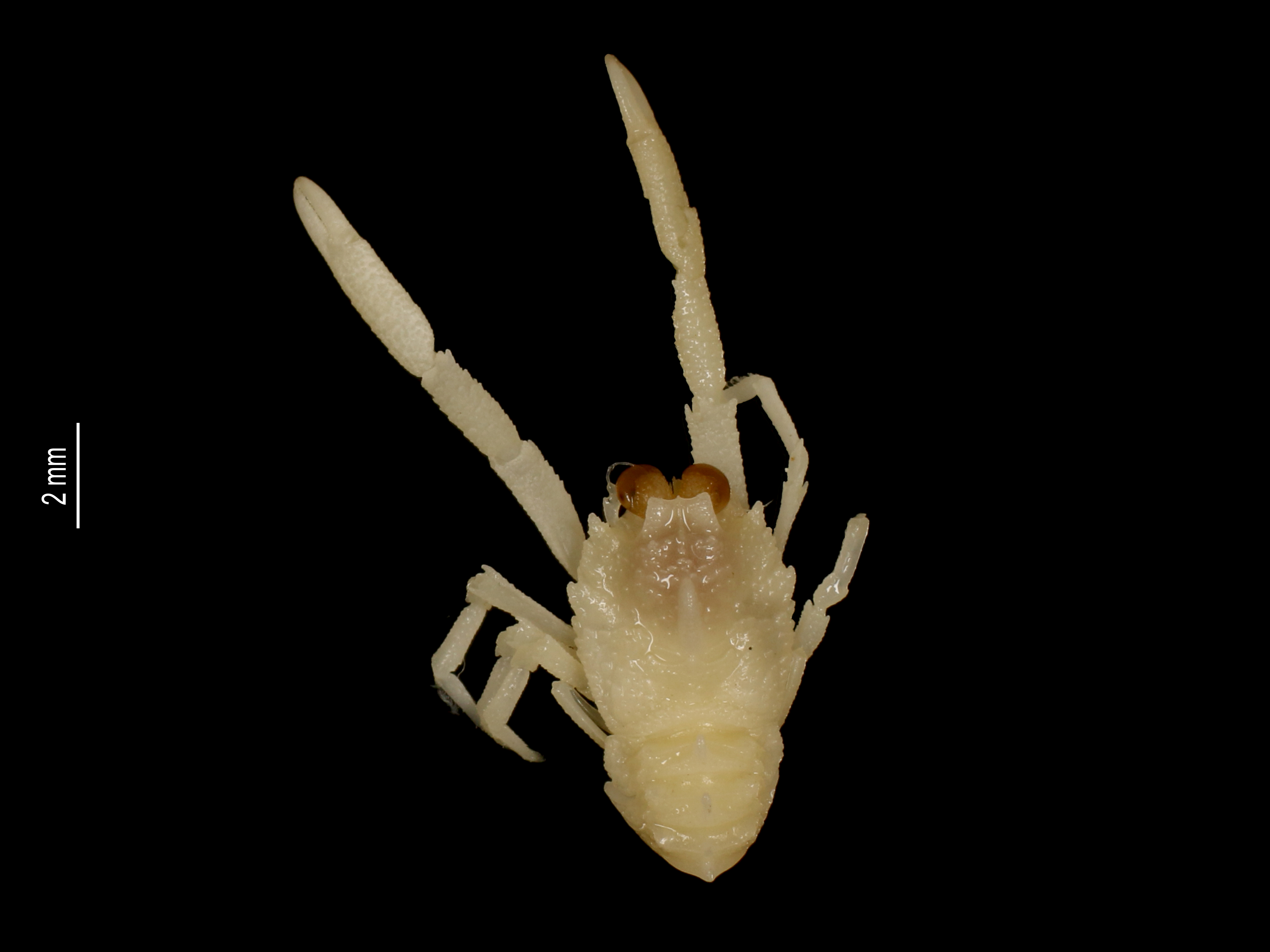

Scientific classification
- Kingdom: Animalia
- Phylum: Arthropoda
- Clade: Pancrustacea
- Class: Malacostraca
- Order: Decapoda
- Suborder: Pleocyemata
- Infraorder: Anomura
- Family: Munididae
- Genus: Heteronida
- Species: H. clivicola

Binomial name
- Heteronida clivicola Macpherson & Baba, 2006

= Heteronida clivicola =

Species of crustacean

Heteronida clivicola is a species of squat lobster in the family Munididae. The name refers to the Roman goddess Clivicola. The males usually measure between 2.9 and 3.9 millimetres (0.11 and 0.15 in). It is found off of French Polynesia, at depths between about 325 and 700 metres (1,066 and 2,297 ft).
