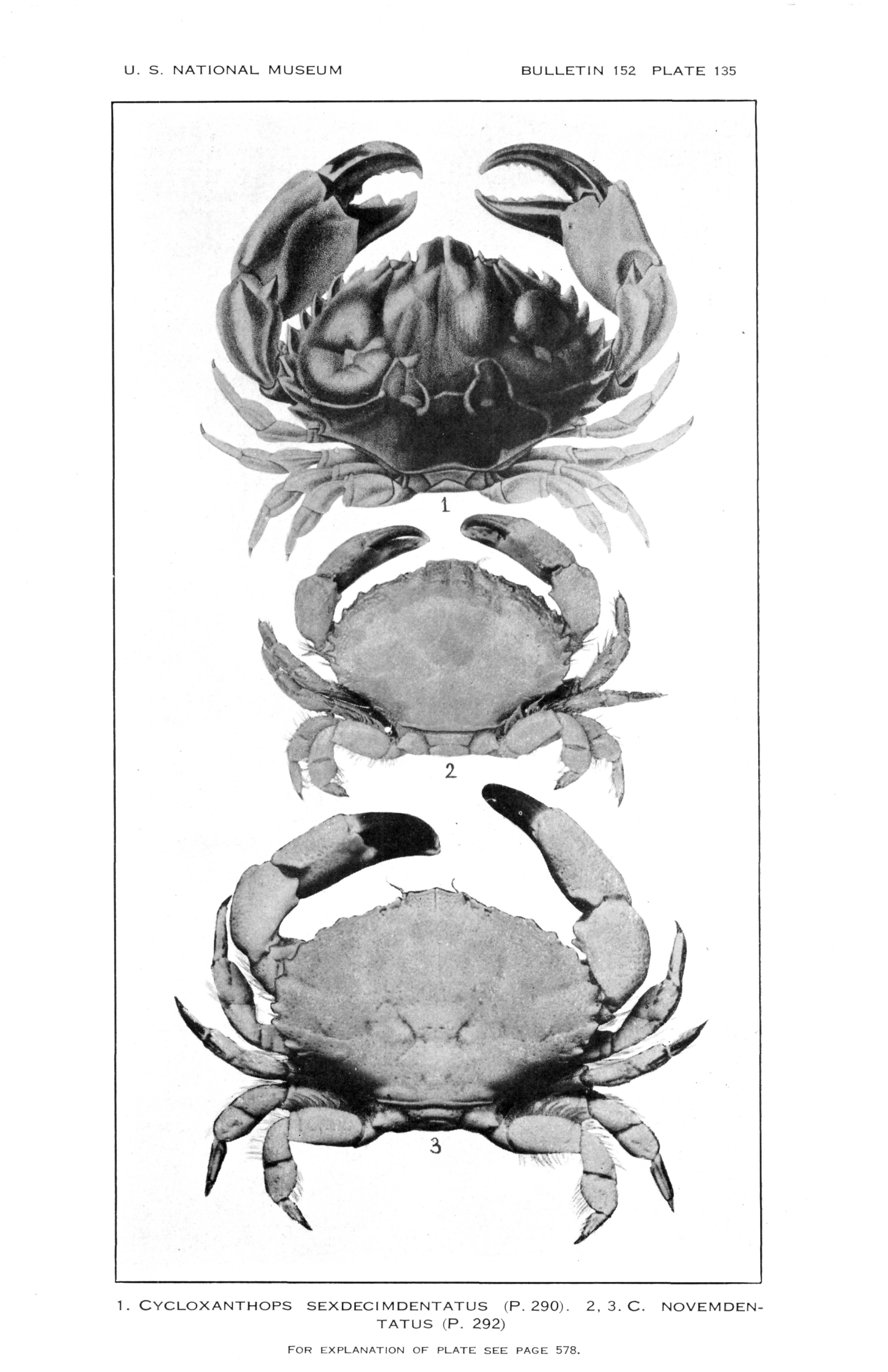
- Top: Cycloxanthops sexdecimdentatus, Middle and bottom: Cycloxanthops novemdentatus

Scientific classification
- Domain: Eukaryota
- Kingdom: Animalia
- Phylum: Arthropoda
- Class: Malacostraca
- Order: Decapoda
- Suborder: Pleocyemata
- Infraorder: Brachyura
- Family: Xanthidae
- Subfamily: Xanthinae
- Genus: Cycloxanthops; Rathbun, 1897

= Cycloxanthops =

Genus of crabs

Cycloxanthops is a genus of crabs in the family Xanthidae, containing the following species:

- Cycloxanthops novemdentatus (Lockington, 1877)
- Cycloxanthops occidentalis (A. Milne Edwards, 1868)
- Cycloxanthops sexdecimdentatus (H. Milne Edwards & Lucas, 1843)
- Cycloxanthops vittatus (Stimpson, 1860)
