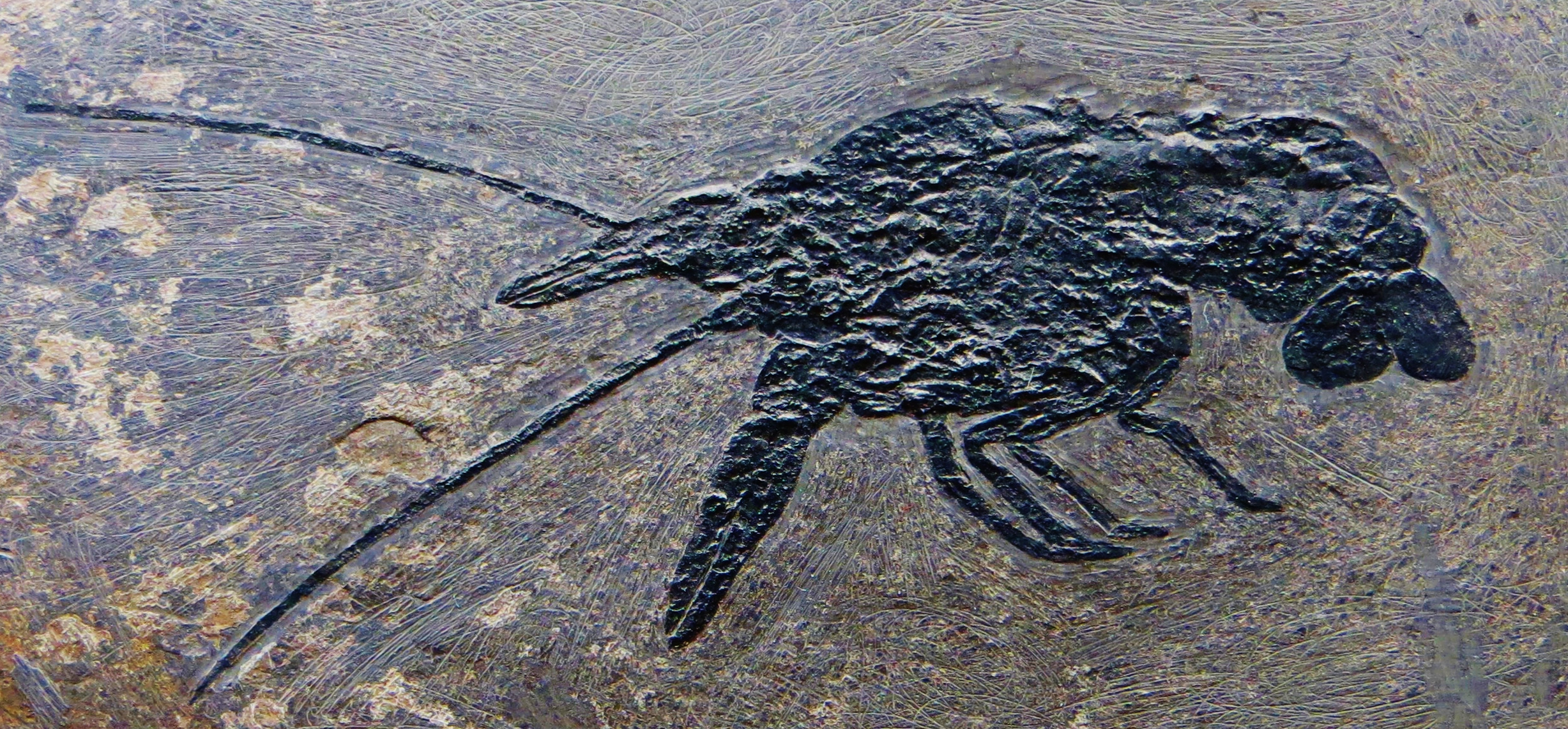
- Glaessnericaris macrochela

Scientific classification
- Kingdom: Animalia
- Phylum: Arthropoda
- Class: Malacostraca
- Order: Decapoda
- Suborder: Pleocyemata
- Family: †Glaessnericaridae; Karasawa, Schweitzer & Feldmann, 2013
- Genus: †Glaessnericaris; Garassino & Teruzzi, 1993

Type species
- †Glaessnericaris macrochela Garassino & Teruzzi, 1993

Other species
- †Glaessnericaris dubia (Pinna, 1974)

= Glaessnericaris =

Glaessnericaris Temporal range: Late Triassic (Norian)

Extinct genus of crustaceans

Glaessnericaris is an extinct genus of lobster-like decapod crustaceans that is the sole member of the family Glaessnericaridae and lived in what is now the modern day Lombardy region of Northern Italy during the Norian age of the Late Triassic Epoch.

It contains two species, Glaessnericaris macrochela (the type species) and Glaessnericaris dubia, which was originally assigned to the genus Protoclytiopsis.
