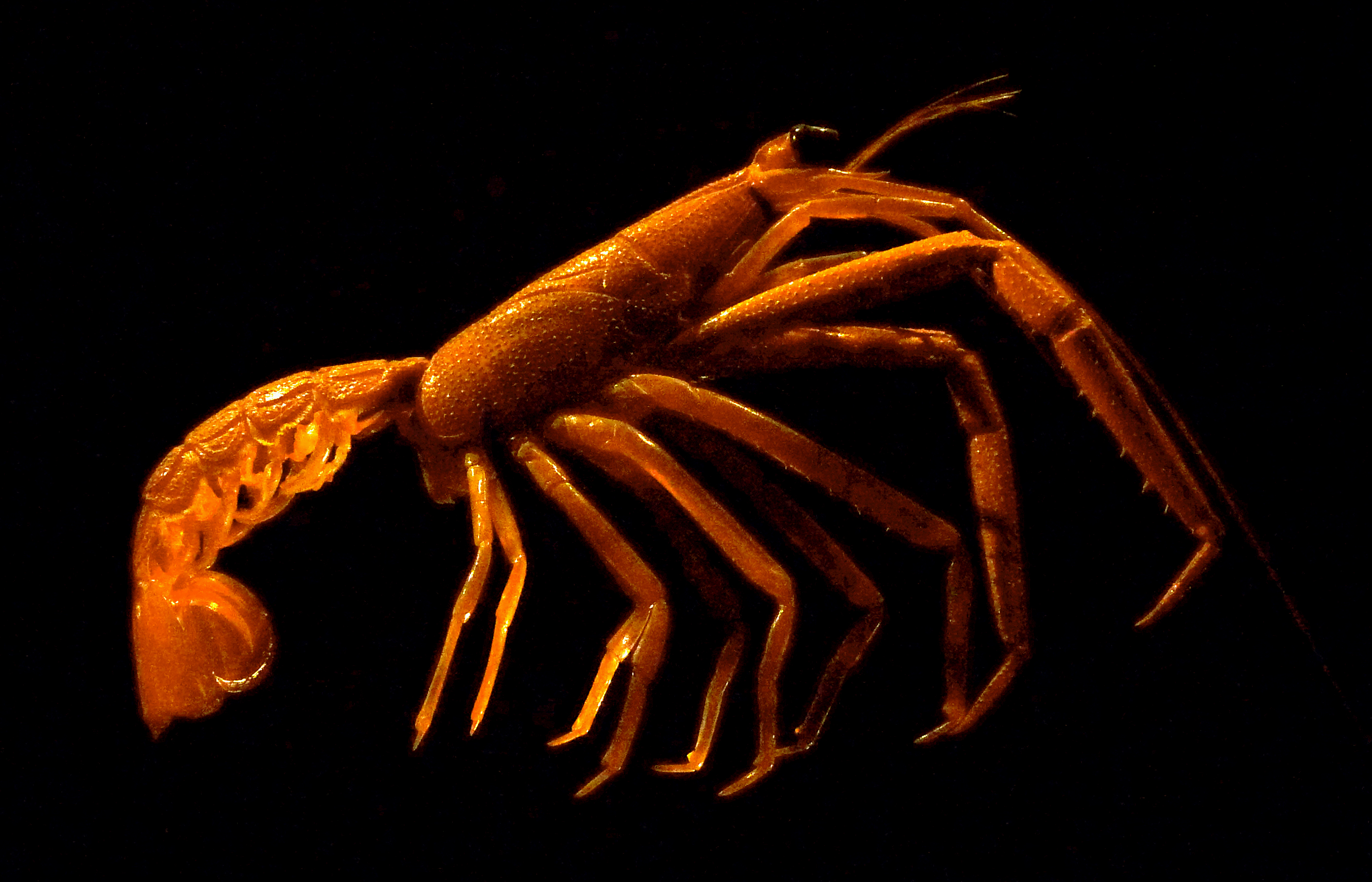
- Neoglyphea inopinata

Scientific classification
- Kingdom: Animalia
- Phylum: Arthropoda
- Clade: Pancrustacea
- Class: Malacostraca
- Order: Decapoda
- Suborder: Pleocyemata
- Infraorder: Glypheidea
- Superfamily: Glypheoidea; Winkler, 1883

= Glypheoidea =

Glypheoidea Temporal range: Permo-Triassic–Recent

Superfamily of crustaceans

The Glypheoidea (containing the glypheoid lobsters), is a group of lobster-like decapod crustaceans which forms an important part of fossil faunas, such as the Solnhofen limestone. These fossils included taxa such as Glyphea (from which the group takes its name), and Mecochirus, mostly with elongated (often semichelate) chelipeds. This group of decapods is a good example of a living fossil, or a lazarus taxon, since until their discovery in the 1970s, the group was considered to have become extinct in the Eocene. The superfamily Glypheoidea comprises five families. The two extant species, Neoglyphea inopinata and Laurentaeglyphea neocaledonica, are both in the family Glypheidae.

== Prehistoric abundance ==
The first animals attributable to the Glypheoidea appeared in the Permo-Triassic. They were abundant in the Jurassic, but declined from the Cretaceous to the Eocene.

== Extant taxa ==
The Glypheoidea was originally considered to be a purely fossil group. That opinion had to be altered when a single male specimen was discovered in the collections of the Smithsonian Institution in 1975. It had been caught off the Philippines in 1908 and preserved, without its full significance being realised. Over sixty years later, the specimen was rediscovered, and described by two French scientists as a new genus and species, Neoglyphea inopinata in 1975, meaning "unexpected new Glyphea". More individuals were caught on subsequent expeditions in 1976, 1980 and 1985, allowing for a complete description. A second species was discovered in the Coral Sea, near New Caledonia, in 2005. First described as Neoglyphea neocaledonica, in 2006, it has been transferred to a new genus Laurentaeglyphea, much closer to fossil forms.

== Classification ==
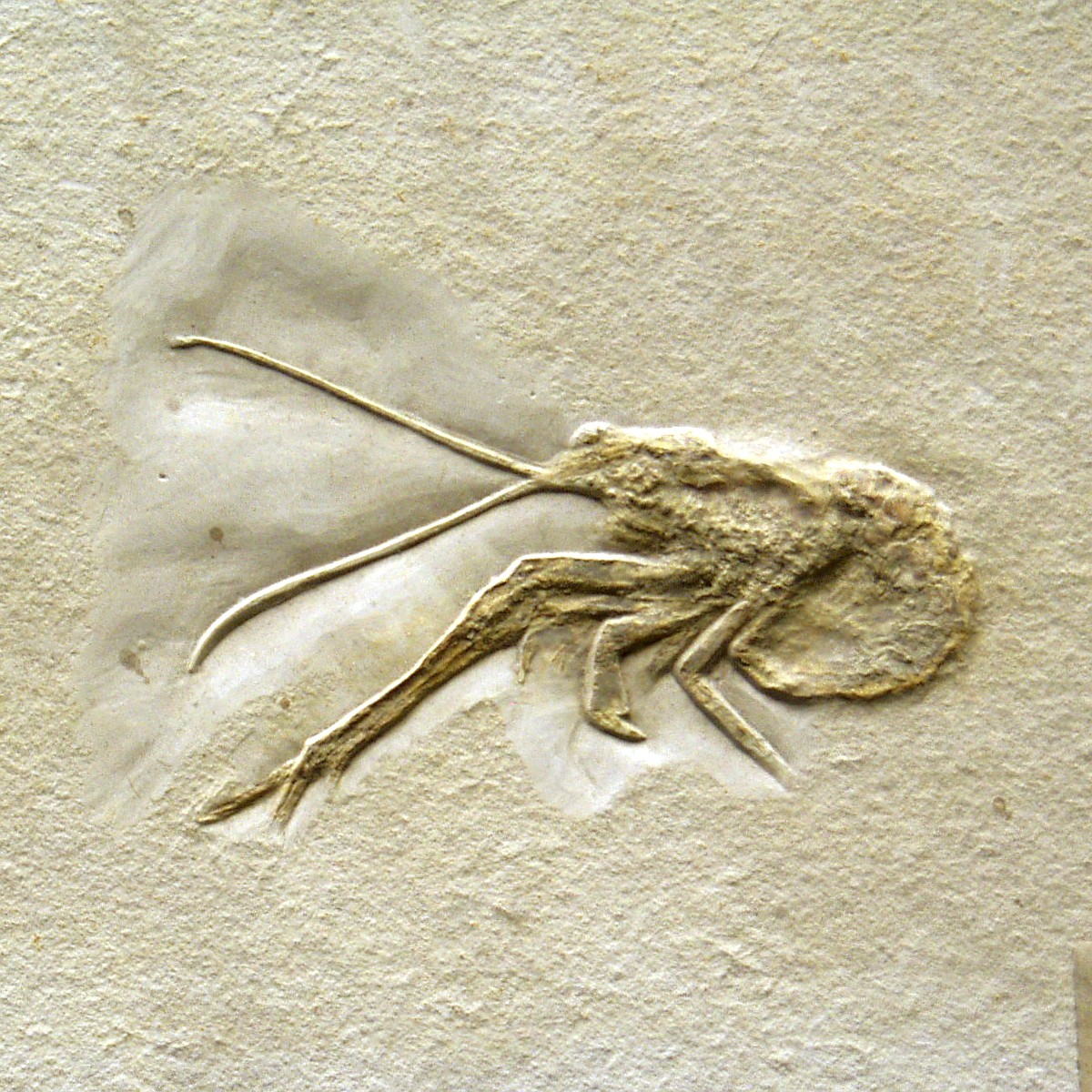
Fossil Mecochirus longimanatus

Five families are recognised, containing a total of 21 genera, all but two of which are extinct (extant taxa marked in boldface):

- † Chimaerastacidae

- † Chimaerastacus

- **Glypheidae**

- † Cedrillosa
- † Glyphea
- **Laurentaeglyphea**
- **Neoglyphea**
- † Squamosoglyphea
- † Trachysoma

- † Litogastridae

- † Lissocardia
- † Litogaster
- † Paralitogaster
- † Pseudoglyphea
- † Pseudopemphix
- † Tridactylastacus

- † Mecochiridae

- † Huhatanka
- † Jabaloya
- † Mecochirus
- † Meyeria
- † Preatya
- † Selenisca

- † Platychelidae

- † Platychela
- † Platypleon
