= Litogastridae =

Litogastridae Temporal range: Olenekian – Late Jurassic

Scientific classification
- Kingdom: Animalia
- Phylum: Arthropoda
- Clade: Pancrustacea
- Class: Malacostraca
- Order: Decapoda
- Suborder: Pleocyemata
- Superfamily: Glypheoidea
- Family: †Litogastridae; Karasawa, 2013

Genera
- See text

Family of fossil decapods

Litogastridae is a family of decapod crustaceans known only from fossils. They survived from the Early Triassic to the Late Jurassic. It was first given the name Litogastroidae, but this does not comply with article 29.2 in ICZN.

== Genera ==
As of 2013, the following species are included:

- †Lissocardia von Meyer, 1851 (= Piratella Assmann, 1927)
- †Litogaster von Meyer, 1847
- †Paralitogaster Glaessner, 1969
- †Pseudoglyphea Oppel, 1861
- †Tridactylastacus Feldmann et al., 2012
