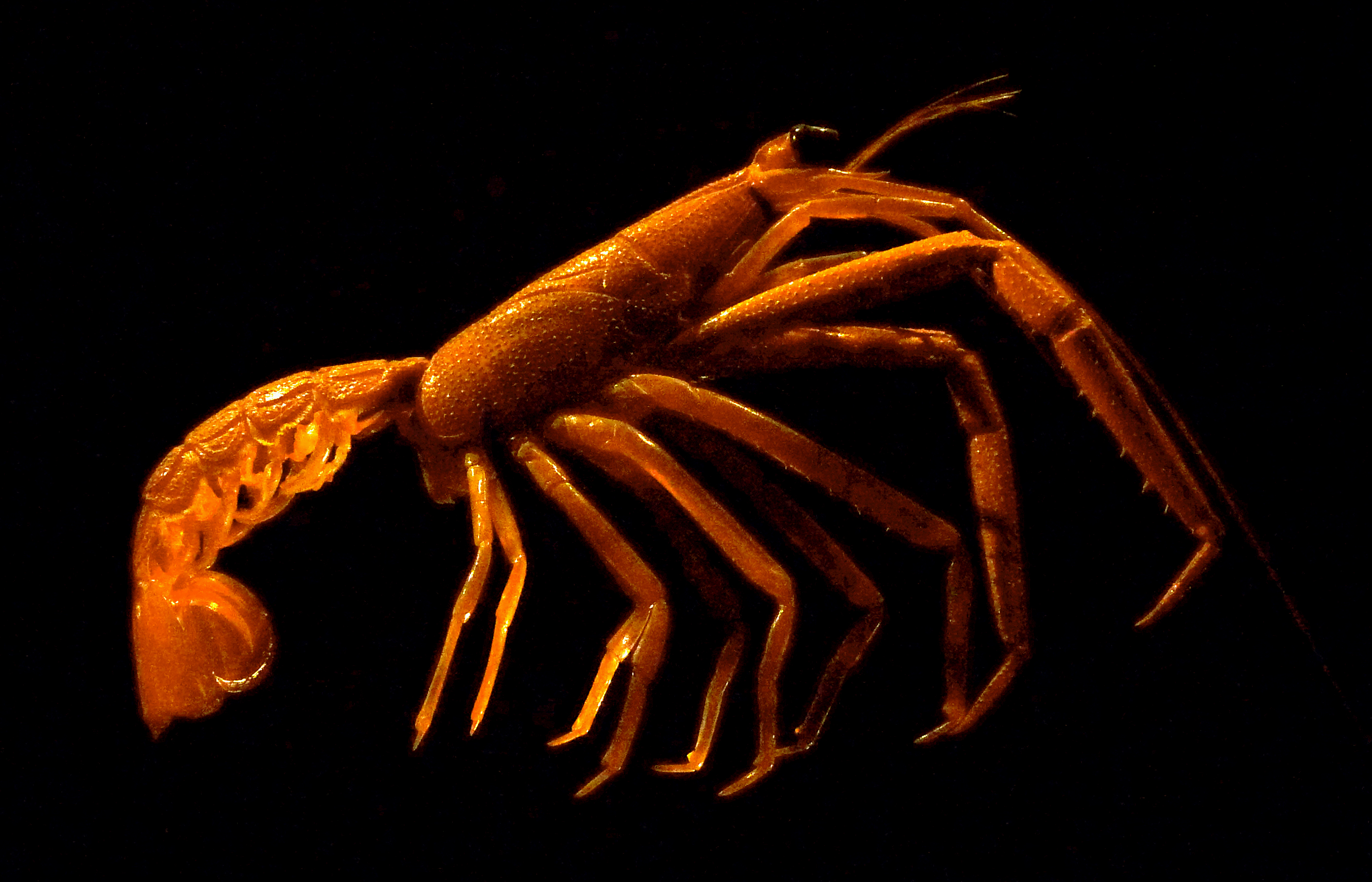

Conservation status
- Data Deficient (IUCN 3.1)

Scientific classification
- Kingdom: Animalia
- Phylum: Arthropoda
- Class: Malacostraca
- Order: Decapoda
- Suborder: Pleocyemata
- Family: Glypheidae
- Genus: Neoglyphea; Forest & de Saint Laurent, 1975
- Species: N. inopinata

Binomial name
- Neoglyphea inopinata Forest & de Saint Laurent, 1975

= Neoglyphea =

Genus of crustaceans

Neoglyphea inopinata is a species of glypheoid lobster, a group thought long extinct before Neoglyphea was discovered. It is a lobster-like animal, up to around 15 centimetres (5.9 in) in length, although without claws. It is only known from 17 specimens, caught at two sites – one at the entrance to Manila Bay in the Philippines, and one in the Timor Sea, north of Australia. Due to the small number of specimens available, little is known about the species, but it appears to live up to five years, with a short larval phase. A second species, previously included in Neoglyphea, is now placed in a separate genus, Laurentaeglyphea.

== Taxonomy ==
Neoglyphea inopinata was named in 1975 by Jacques Forest and Michèle de Saint Laurent of the Muséum national d'histoire naturelle in Paris. It was based on a single damaged specimen that had been caught by the USFC Albatross in the Philippines in 1908, and deposited in the United States National Museum. De Saint Laurent examined the unidentified specimen while working on Thalassinidea at the Smithsonian Institution. The name Neoglyphea means "new Glyphea", while the specific epithet inopinata means "unexpected".

A second extant species of glypheoid was originally placed in the genus Neoglyphea as Neoglyphea neocaledonica, but was later split into a separate genus, Laurentaeglyphea.

== Significance ==
Until the discovery of Neoglyphea, the Glypheoidea was thought to have died out before the end of the Eocene, 34 million years ago. They had been thought to be closely related to spiny lobsters and slipper lobsters, with which they formed the group "Palinura". Study of non-fossil specimens made it apparent that the similarities between the two groups resulted from analogy, rather than homology, and that Glypheoidea was closer to lobsters and crayfish. Glypheoidea is occasionally included within the infraorder Astacidea, but molecular analysis using the DNA of Neoglyphea and Laurentaeglyphea suggest that it is better placed as a separate infraorder, Glypheidea.

== Distribution ==
Localities from which Neoglyphea has been collected

Neoglyphea has been caught in two distantly separated geographical areas. The initial specimens were from a small area at the entrance to Manila Bay at depths of 186–189 metres (610–620 ft). Three additional specimens have been recovered from a locality in the Timor Sea (near 9°46′S 130°0′E) at a depth of 240–300 m (790–980 ft).

== Description ==
The overall length of the known specimens of Neoglyphea varies from 7 centimetres (2.8 in) to 14.9 cm (5.9 in).

=== Cephalothorax ===
The cephalothorax is almost entirely covered by a carapace, only the insertion of the eyestalks protruding slightly beyond it. A deep transverse groove, called the cervical groove, divides the anterior 40% of the carapace from the posterior 60%. At the front, the carapace bears a fairly long rostrum, which is wide at the base, giving it a triangular outline when seen from above. From the side, it is curved in a weak S-shape, bending initially upwards, and then curving slightly forwards again. The cephalothorax becomes slightly wider behind the cervical groove. The carapace, including the rostrum, is covered with forward-pointing teeth (pointed tubercles), including two rows side-by-side along the animal's midline; these rows bridge the cervical groove, but become weaker in the posterior half of the carapace. Beneath the carapace is a branchial chamber, containing 28 pairs of gills.

The underside of the cephalothorax is dominated in the forward part by an unusually long epistome, which is a "most distinctive" feature of Neoglyphea. The epistome is effectively the sternite of the antennal segment, and lies between the base of the antennae and the beginning of the labrum. In Neoglyphea, it is 1.5 times longer than it is wide, and is broadly rectangular in outline. Like the carapace, it is covered in spiny tubercles, although they are smaller and straighter on the epistome. Two rows of larger spines diverge towards the rear of the epistome, leaving an area which is largely devoid of such spines.

=== Abdomen ===
The form of the abdomen of Neoglyphea is similar to that of lobsters and other long-bodied decapods. Its first segment is less than half the length of the succeeding 6 segments. The abdomen ends in a telson, which is about 1.5 times as long as the other abdominal segments, flanked by a pair of uropods. The uropods have similarly sized exopods and endopods, fringed with long hairs; the exopod is divided towards the end by a jointed diaeresis.

=== Appendages ===
Two separate eyestalks extend forwards from below the rostrum, each bearing a pigmented, movable compound eye. These are followed by two pairs of antennae. The first pair (the antennules) are biramous, with the two flagella of similar size, one of 65 segments, and one of 50 segments; the second pair are uniramous and much thicker and longer than the first pair, reaching twice the length of the carapace. The antennal glands open at the base of the second antennae.

The animal's mouthparts comprise paired mandibles, maxillules, maxillae and three pairs of maxillipeds, although the third maxillipeds are very long and more closely resemble the walking legs than the other mouthparts. There are five pairs of walking legs, or pereiopods, diminishing in size from front to back. There are no chelae (claws), although the last segment may be able to grip against an extension of the previous segment in some cases (subchelate). The first four pairs are similarly arranged, extending forwards and downwards to be used in walking; the fifth pair is directed upwards. The abdomen bears five pairs of pleopods, of which the first are modified for use in copulation in the males.

=== Sexual dimorphism ===
Neoglyphea inopinata shows a clear sexual dimorphism in the size and proportions of the first pereiopods and the shape of the abdominal pleurites. In males, the first pereiopods are markedly longer than in females, with most of the additional length occurring in the merus and propodus (third and fourth segments). The female merus is also wider, and bears three additional teeth towards its distal end. Males have pointed abdominal pleurites, in contrast to the more rounded shape seen in females. Both these forms of sexual dimorphism are also seen in fossil glypheids, such as Glyphea regleyana.

== Ecology ==
Neoglyphea appears to be most active during the daytime, since most of the known specimens were captured close to midday. Males may gather most of the food, while the females remain in their burrows; this would explain the small proportion of females among the captured specimens. The recovery of both males and females in May might suggest that this is the species' mating period. The relatively large size of the gonopores of females suggests a large egg size, and thus reduced development and eclosion in a relatively advanced state. It is therefore likely that any planktonic larval stage must be brief, which is also supported by the animal's apparently restricted distribution. Individuals appear to survive for up to five years at least, although longer lifespans cannot be excluded. All these details, although speculative, are similar to that seen in better-known species such as Nephrops norvegicus.

Examination of the holotype revealed an infestation of parasitic copepods in its gills; these were described as the new species Nicothoe tumulosa in 1976.
