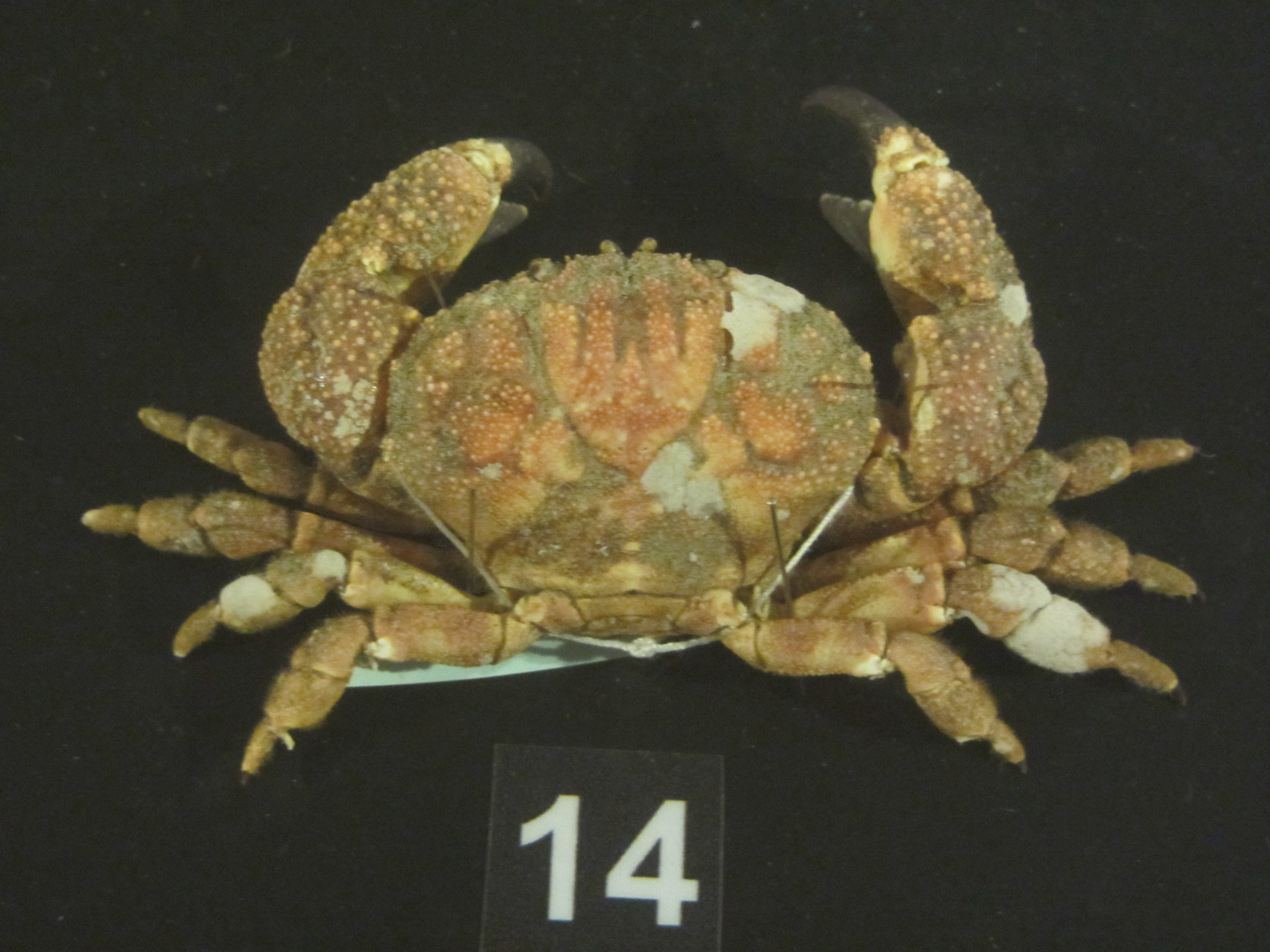
- Forestia depressa

Scientific classification
- Domain: Eukaryota
- Kingdom: Animalia
- Phylum: Arthropoda
- Class: Malacostraca
- Order: Decapoda
- Suborder: Pleocyemata
- Infraorder: Brachyura
- Family: Xanthidae
- Genus: Forestia; Guinot, 1976

= Forestia (crab) =

Genus of crabs

Forestia is a genus of crabs in the family Xanthidae, containing the following species:

- Forestia abrolhensis (Montgomery, 1931)
- Forestia depressa (White, 1848)
- Forestia pascua Garth, 1985
- Forestia scabra (Odhner, 1925)

The name Forestia commemorates the French carcinologist Jacques Forest.
