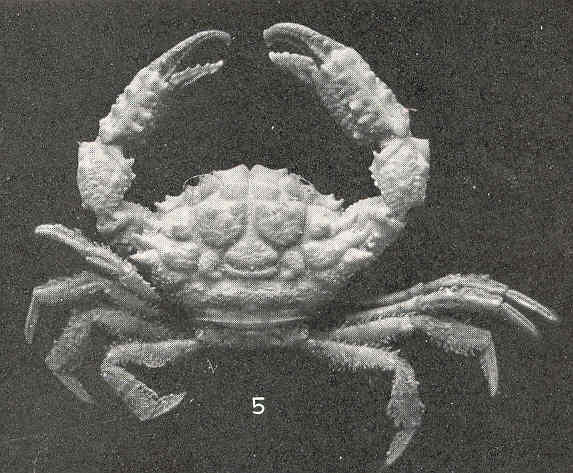
- Medaeus ornatus

Scientific classification
- Domain: Eukaryota
- Kingdom: Animalia
- Phylum: Arthropoda
- Class: Malacostraca
- Order: Decapoda
- Suborder: Pleocyemata
- Infraorder: Brachyura
- Family: Xanthidae
- Subfamily: Euxanthinae
- Genus: Medaeus; Dana, 1851

= Medaeus =

Genus of crabs

Medaeus is a genus of crabs in the family Xanthidae, containing the following species:

- Medaeus aztec Davie, 1997
- Medaeus danielita Mendoza & Ng, 2010
- Medaeus elegans A. Milne-Edwards, 1867
- Medaeus grandis Davie, 1993
- †Medaeus granulosus Martin, 1880
- †Medaeus mbalavuensis Rathbun, 1945
- Medaeus ornatus Dana, 1852
- †Medaeus variabilis Rathbun, 1945
