= Michèle de Saint Laurent =

French carcinologist (1926–2003)

- Born: December 9, 1926; Fontainebleau, Seine-et-Marne
- Died: July 11, 2003 (aged 76); Lannion, Côtes-d'Armor
- Education: University of Paris
- Scientific career
- Fields: Carcinology
- Workplaces: Muséum national d'histoire naturelle

Michèle de Saint Laurent (December 9, 1926 – July 11, 2003) was a French carcinologist. She spent most of her career at the Muséum national d'histoire naturelle in Paris, working on the systematics of decapod crustaceans; her major contributions were to hermit crabs and Thalassinidea, and she also co-described Neoglyphea, a living fossil discovered in 1975.

== Biography ==
Michèle de Saint Laurent was born on December 9, 1926, at Fontainebleau, near Paris. Her father, an army officer, retired on grounds of ill health in 1938 and moved with his family to Plestin-les-Grèves in Brittany; he died in 1939. During the Second World War, Michèle's mother concealed British airmen from the Nazi regime, for which she was convicted in 1942 by a military tribunal and sent to Ravensbrück concentration camp, where she died in 1944.

Michèle married in 1950, taking the name Michèle Dechancé, and her daughter Odile was born later that year. She studied general biology at the University of Paris under Pierre-Paul Grassé, earning her Diplôme de Licence in 1954. She started undertaking scientific research even before finishing her degree, during a term spent at the Institut Pasteur under Robert Deschiens, where she investigated the effect of iron salts on the molluscs that transmit schistosomiasis (also known as bilharzia or snail fever). The resulting paper brought her into contact with staff at the Muséum national d'histoire naturelle in Paris, where Jacques Forest suggested she study the larvae of hermit crabs. From 1955 until 1960, she worked at the Centre National de la Recherche Scientifique (CNRS), at their laboratory at Banyuls-sur-Mer; thereafter, she returned to the Paris museum.

In 1965, Michèle divorced, and returned to using her maiden name. She retired on October 1, 1992, and split her time between her continued research activities and spending time at a house in Brittany. She had suffered for years from hepatitis C and contracted liver cancer in 2001; she died following a fall on July 11, 2003.

== Work ==
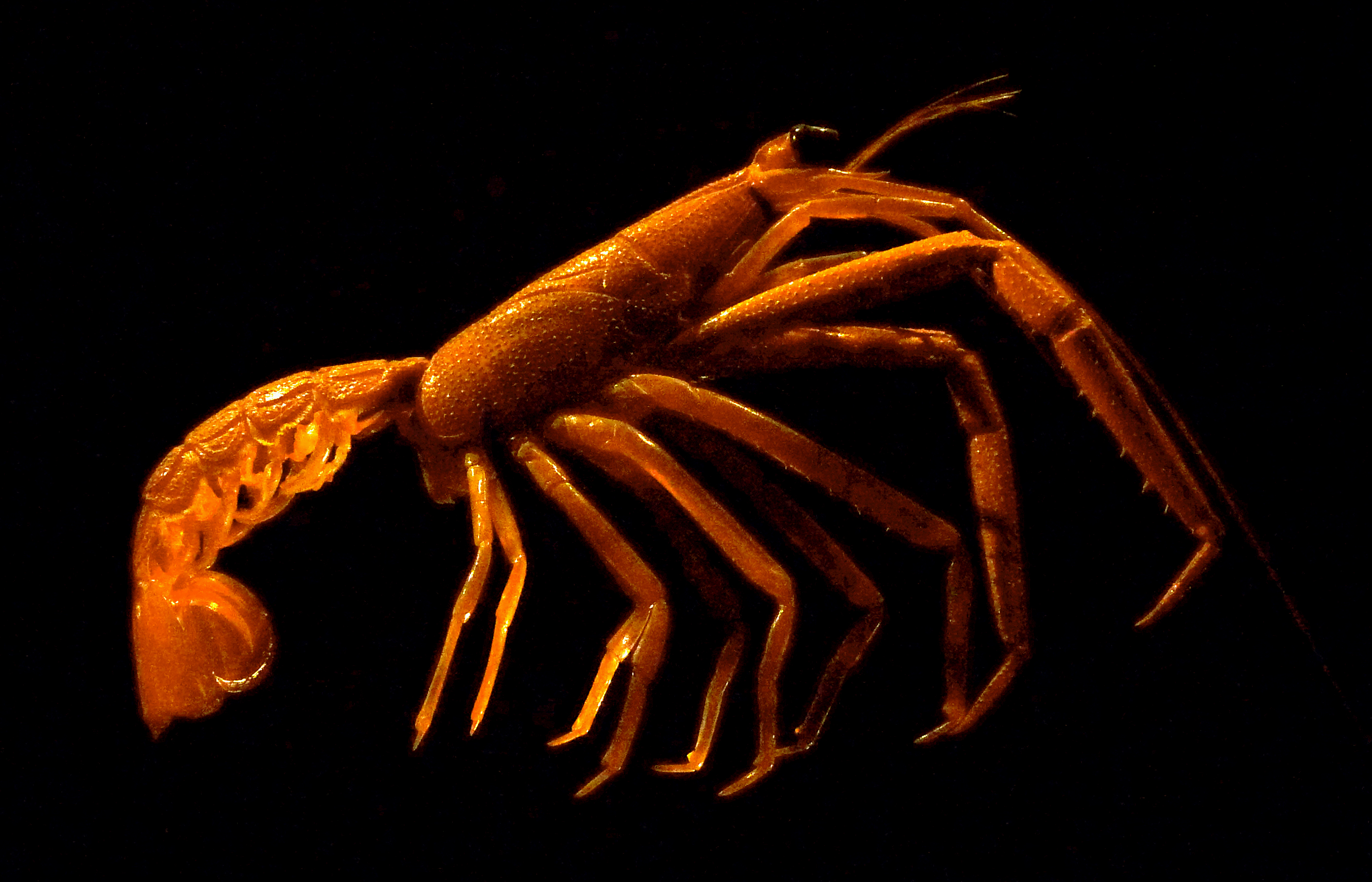
Neoglyphea, a living glypheoid first recognised by Michèle de Saint Laurent and Jacques Forest

The first major focus of Michèle de Saint Laurent's work was the systematics of hermit crabs. In the late 1960s, she revised the family Paguridae, erecting several new genera. She was also involved in describing the hermit crabs of the Calypso expedition from the Atlantic coast of South America, and was on board the Jean Charcot and the Thalassa during their scientific voyages.

She also investigated other decapod crustaceans, particularly the Thalassinidea. As a result of this work, she was invited in 1974 to visit the Smithsonian Institution to study the thalassinideans in their collections. During this work, she was given an unidentified specimen by Fenner A. Chace Jr. which had been caught by the Albatross expedition in 1908. She and Jacques Forest realised that it represented a living relative of the Glypheoidea, a group previously thought to have been extinct since the Eocene. They described the new genus together in 1975, as Neoglyphea.

De Saint Laurent's later work included a new classification of crabs (involving the recognition of a new section, Eubrachyura), and three new superfamilies (Axioidea, Enoplometopoidea and Retroplumoidea), as well as various works on the decapods of hydrothermal vents.
