= Litogaster =

Litogaster Temporal range: Triassic

Scientific classification
- Kingdom: Animalia
- Phylum: Arthropoda
- Class: Malacostraca
- Order: Decapoda
- Suborder: Pleocyemata
- Family: †Litogastridae
- Genus: †Litogaster; Meyer, 1847

Type species
- Litogaster obtusa (Meyer, 1844)

Extinct genus of crustaceans

Litogaster is a genus of extinct decapod crustaceans known only from fossils in the Triassic.

== Species ==
The following species are included as of 2022:

- †Litogaster obtusa (Meyer, 1844) (=Litogaster ornata Meyer, 1851)
- †Litogaster durlachensis Förster, 1967
- †?Litogaster keuperinus Kuhn, 1939
- †Litogaster limicola (König, 1920)
- †?Litogaster luxoviensis Étallon, 1859
- †Litogaster tiefenbachensis Assmann, 1927
- †Litogaster tuberculata Assmann, 1927
- †Litogaster turnbullensis Schram, 1971
