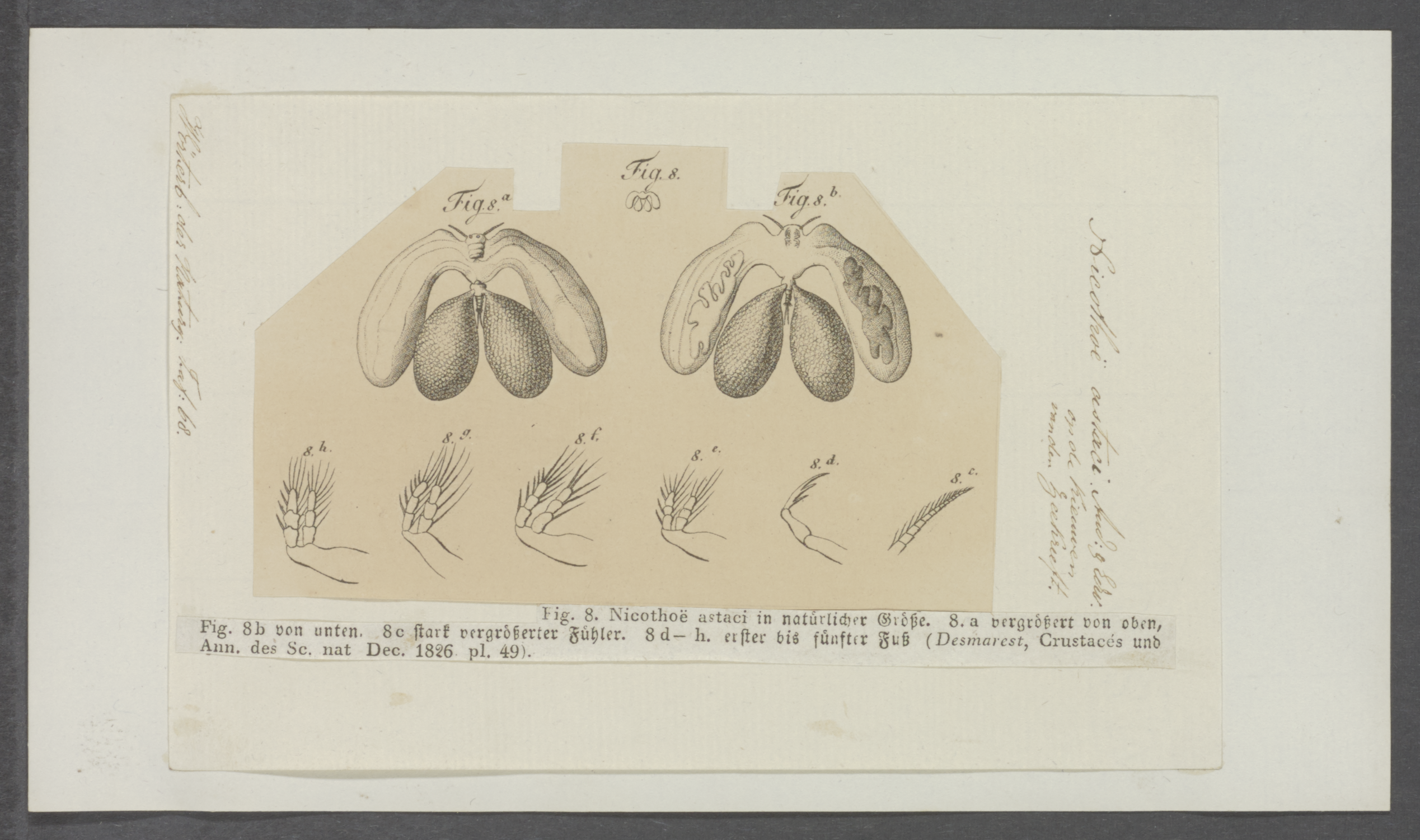
- Nicothoë astaci

Scientific classification
- Kingdom: Animalia
- Phylum: Arthropoda
- Clade: Pancrustacea
- Class: Copepoda
- Order: Siphonostomatoida
- Family: Nicothoidae; Dana, 1852

= Nicothoidae =

Family of crustaceans

Nicothoidae is a family of copepods, containing the following genera:

- Arhizorhina Bamber & Boxshall, 2006
- Aspidoecia Giard & Bonnier, 1889
- Cephalorhiza Boxshall & Harrison, 1988
- Choniomyzon Pillai, 1962
- Choniorhiza Boxshall & Lincoln, 1983
- Choniosphaera Connolly, 1929
- Choniostoma Hansen, 1886
- Diexanthema Ritchie, 1975
- Hadrothoe Humes, 1975
- Hansenulus Heron & Damkaer, 1986
- Homoeoscelis Hansen, 1897
- Mysidion Hansen, 1897
- Neomysidion Ohtsuka, Boxshall & Harada, 2005
- Nicorhiza Lincoln & Boxshall, 1983
- Nicothoe Audouin & H. Milne-Edwards, 1825
- Paranicothoe Carton, 1970
- Rhizorhina Hansen, 1892
- Sphaeronella Salensky, 1868
- Sphaeronelloides Bradford, 1975
- Sphaeronellopsis Hansen, 1904
- Stenothocheres Hansen, 1897
