= Jacques Forest =

French carcinologist (1920–2012)

- Born: 14 June 1920; Créteil, Val-de-Marne
- Died: 16 February 2012 (aged 91)
- Education: University of Lille
- Scientific career
- Fields: Carcinology
- Workplaces: Muséum national d'histoire naturelle

Jacques Forest (14 June 1920 – 16 February 2012) was a French carcinologist.

== Biography ==
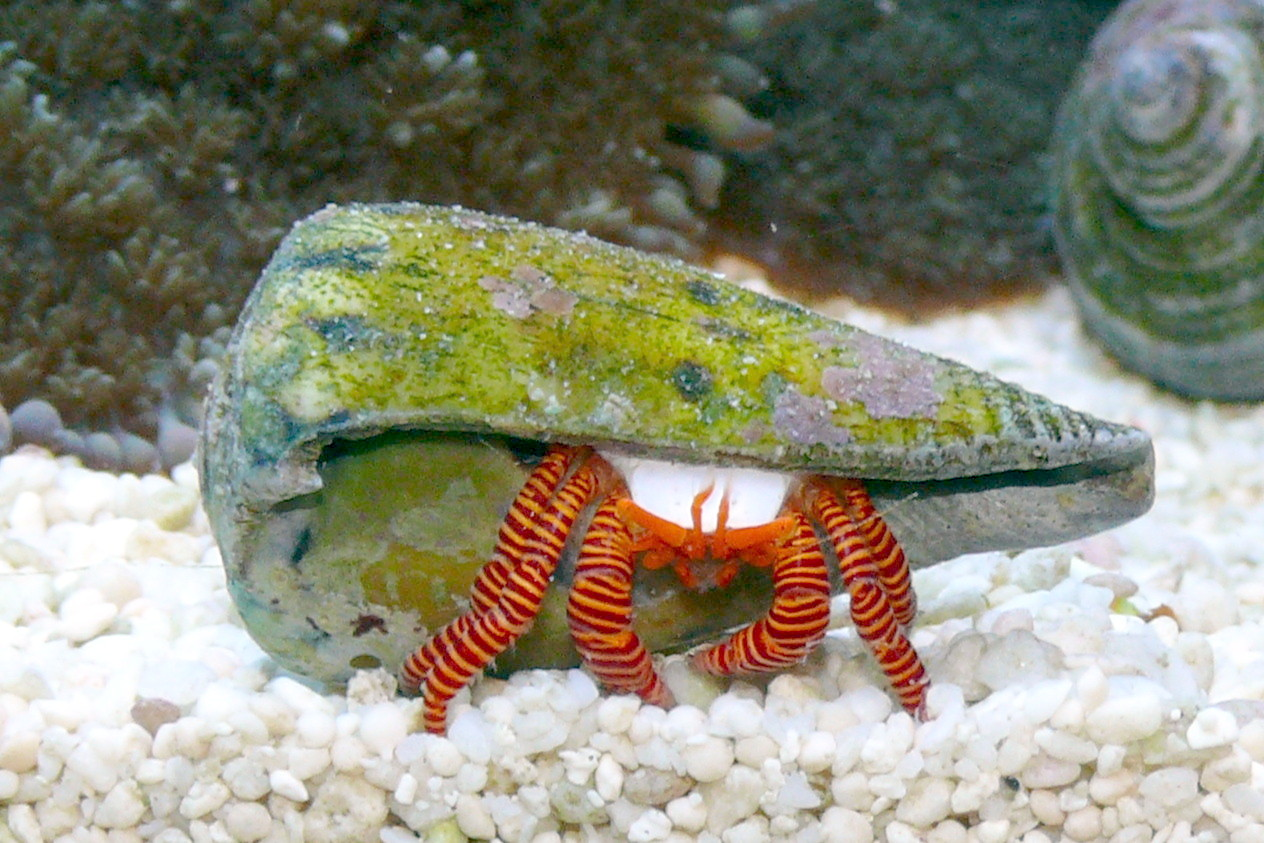
The hermit crab Ciliopagurus strigatus – the genus Ciliopagurus was erected by Jacques Forest in 1995.

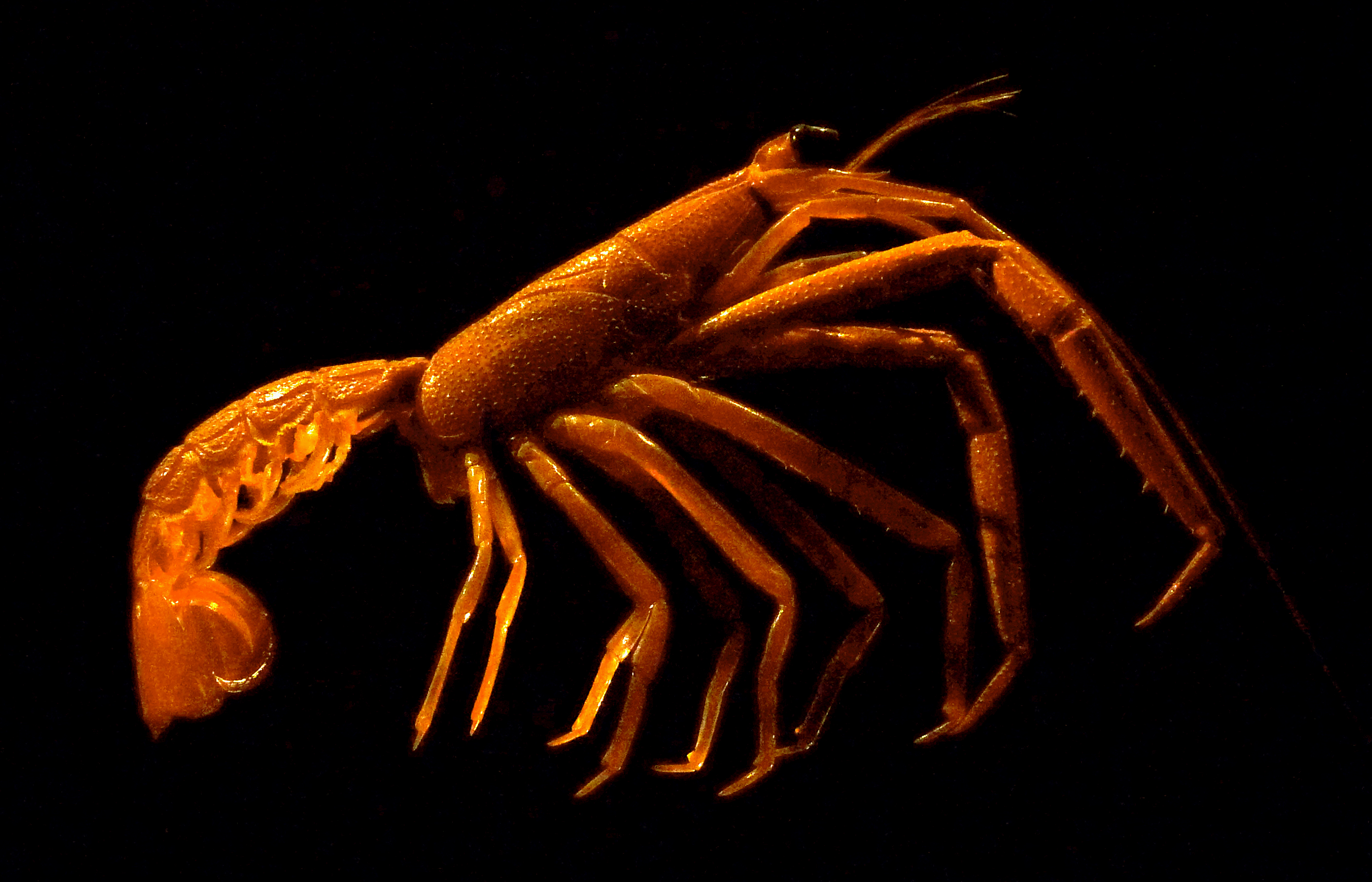
The description of Neoglyphea inopinata was a highlight of Jacques Forest's career.

Born in Créteil on 14 June 1920, Jacques Forest grew up in Maubeuge. He served in the army for a year during the Second World War, and went on to study at the University of Lille after demobilisation. After graduating, he worked for several years for the Office Scientifique et Technique des Pêches Maritimes ("scientific and technical office for marine fisheries"; now part of IFREMER); his early publications concerned a variety of fish species. In 1949, he joined the Muséum national d'histoire naturelle in Paris, where he would remain for the rest of his career.

In association with Louis Fage, Forest began working on hermit crabs, and rapidly became an expert; he described over 70 new species in the family Diogenidae, for example. He also published on other Decapoda, including crabs and, most significantly, Neoglyphea inopinata, a living species of a group previously considered long-since extinct.

Forest was also an enthusiastic field biologist, and took part in several oceanographic expeditions. He launched the MUSORSTOM expeditions in 1976. He was also involved with the scientific journals Bulletin du Muséum national d'Histoire naturelle and Crustaceana.

Forest retired on 1 October 1989, at the age of 69, and continued to be involved with the journal Crustaceana until 2003. The Crustacean Society awarded Forest their Excellence in Research Award in 2008. He died on 16 February 2012.

== Legacy ==
Taxa named in honour of Jacques Forest include:

Genera

- Forestia Guinot, 1976
- Pagurojacquesia de Saint Laurent & McLaughlin, 2000 (replacement name for Jacquesia de Saint Laurent & McLaughlin, 1999)
- Jacforus Ng & Clark, 2003

Species

- Lumbricalus adriatica foresti (Fauvel & Rullier, 1959)
- Sicyonia foresti Rossignol, 1962
- Thalamita foresti Crosnier, 1962
- Lembos foresti Mateus & Mateus, 1966
- Nematopsis foresti (Theodorides, 1967)
- Ventricolaria foresti Fischer-Piette & Testud, 1967
- Asymmetrione foresti (Bourdon, 1968)
- Brachynotus foresti Zariquiey-Alvarez, 1968
- Megachelione foresti Bourdon, 1968
- Brazilserolis foresti (Bastida & Torti, 1970)
- Cyathidium foresti Cherbonnier & Guille, 1972
- Haploniscus foresti Chardy, 1974
- Podocallichirus foresti (Le Loeuff & Intès, 1974)
- Paramunna foresti Carvacho, 1977
- Eucheilota foresti Goy, 1979
- Idmidronea foresti Buge, 1979
- Caryophyllia foresti Zibrowius, 1980
- Strengeriana foresti Rodriguez, 1980
- Alpheus foresti Banner & Banner, 1981
- Holothuria foresti Cherbonnier & Feral, 1981
- Leptochiton foresti (Leloup, 1981)
- Paralophogaster foresti Bacescu, 1981
- Periclimenes foresti A. J. Bruce, 1981
- Psilopsea foresti d'Hondt, 1981
- Nuculana foresti Metivier, 1982
- Platypodia foresti Serene, 1984
- Ethusa foresti Chen, 1985
- Eurysquilla foresti Moosa, 1985
- Processa foresti Noel, 1985
- Jolivetya foresti Cals, 1986
- Niso foresti Bouchet & Warén, 1986
- Arcoscalpellum foresti Rosell, 1989
- Forcepia foresti Lévi & Lévi, 1989
- Leucosia foresti Chen, 1989
- Lophopagurus foresti Zarenkov, 1989
- Porcellanopagurus foresti Zarenkov, 1989
- Trachycarcinus foresti Guinot, 1989
- Upogebia foresti Nguyen, 1989
- Alainosquilla foresti Moosa, 1991
- Ascorhynchus foresti Stock, 1991
- Lophopagurus foresti McLaughlin & Gunn, 1992
- Dromia foresti McLay, 1993
- Palaemonella foresti A. J. Bruce, 2001
- Munida foresti Macpherson & de Saint Laurent, 2002
