= Ernst Friedrich, Baron von Schlotheim =

German palaeontologist and politician

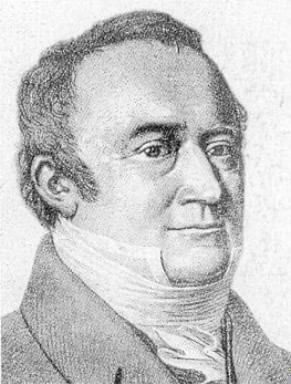
Ernst Friedrich, Baron von Schlotheim.

Ernst Friedrich, Freiherr von Schlotheim (2 April 1764 – 28 March 1832), German palaeontologist and politician, was born in Allmenshausen, Schwarzburg-Sondershausen.

He was Privy Councillor and President of the Chamber at the court of Gotha. Becoming interested in geology he gathered a very extensive collection of fossils. In 1804 he published descriptions and illustrations of remarkable remains of (Carboniferous) plants, Ein Beitrag zur Flora der Vorwelt.

His more important work was entitled Die Petrefactenkunde (1820). In this he incorporated the plates used in his previous memoir and supplemented it by a folio atlas (1822), in which he illustrated his collection of petrified and fossil remains of the animal and vegetable kingdom of a former world. For the first time in Germany the fossils were named according to the binomial system of Linnaeus. His specimens are preserved in the Berlin Museum. He died at Gotha.
