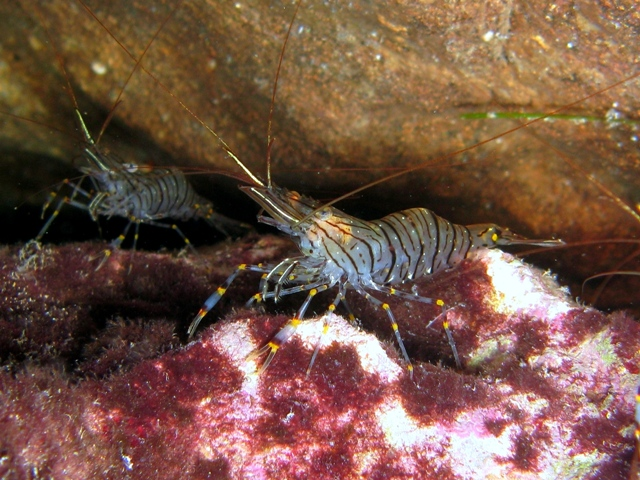
- The shrimp Palaemon serratus of the infraorder Caridea, traditionally referred to as "common prawn"

Scientific classification
- Kingdom: Animalia
- Phylum: Arthropoda
- Clade: Pancrustacea
- Class: Malacostraca
- Superorder: Eucarida
- Order: Decapoda

Groups included
- Anostraca G. O. Sars, 1867; Artemia Leach, 1819; Caprellidae Leach, 1814; Caridea Dana, 1852; Clam shrimp; Cyclestherida Sars, 1899; Laevicaudata Linder, 1945; Spinicaudata Linder, 1945; Dendrobranchiata Bate, 1888; Lophogastrida G. O. Sars, 1870; Mysida Boas, 1883; Notostraca G. O. Sars, 1867; Ostracoda Latreille, 1802; Stomatopoda Latreille, 1817

= Shrimp =

Shrimp Temporal range: Lower Jurassic – Present

Decapod crustaceans

A shrimp (pl.: shrimp (US) or shrimps (UK)) is a common name typically used for crustaceans with an elongated body and a primarily swimming mode of locomotion. The name usually refers to decapods belonging to the Caridea or Dendrobranchiata, although some crustaceans outside this order are also referred to as "shrimp".

More narrow definitions may be restricted to Caridea, to smaller species of either of the aforementioned groups, or only the marine species. Under a broader definition, shrimp may be synonymous with prawn, covering stalk-eyed swimming crustaceans with long, narrow muscular tails (abdomens), long whiskers (antennae), and slender, biramous legs. They swim forward by paddling the swimmerets on the underside of their abdomens, although their escape response is typically repeated flicks with the tail, driving them backwards very quickly ("lobstering"). Crabs and lobsters have strong walking legs, whereas shrimp typically have thin, fragile legs which they use primarily for perching.

Shrimp are widespread and abundant. There are thousands of species adapted to a wide range of habitats, both freshwater and marine; they can be found feeding near the seafloor on most coasts and estuaries, as well as in rivers and lakes. They play important roles in the food chain and are an important food source for larger animals ranging from fish to whales; to escape predators, some species flip off the seafloor and dive into the sediment. They usually live from one to seven years. Shrimp are often solitary, though they can form large schools during the spawning season.

Being one of the more popular shellfish eaten, the muscular tails of many forms of shrimp are eaten by humans, and they are widely caught or farmed for human consumption. It is estimated that about 440 billion farmed shrimp, and about 25 trillion wild shrimp, are slaughtered annually. Excessive bycatch and overfishing (from wild shrimperies) is a significant concern, and waterbodies may suffer from pollution when they are used to support shrimp farming.

== Classification ==
=== Shrimp vis-à-vis prawn ===
Shrimp and prawn

From Raymond Bauer in Remarkable Shrimps:

- Shrimp is characteristically used to refer to those crustaceans with long antennae, slender legs, and a laterally compressed, muscular abdomen that is highly adapted for both forward swimming and a backward (retrograde) escape response.
- Prawn is often used as a synonym of shrimp for penaeoidean and caridean shrimp, especially those of large size.

From the English Oxford Dictionaries:

- Shrimp: a small free-swimming crustacean with an elongated body, typically marine and frequently of commercial importance as food.
- Prawn: a marine crustacean which resembles a large shrimp.

The terms shrimp and prawn are common names, not scientific names. They are vernacular or colloquial terms, which lack the formal definition of scientific terms. They are not taxa, but are terms of convenience with little circumscriptional significance. There is no reason to avoid using the terms shrimp or prawn when convenient, but it is important not to confuse them with the names or relationships of actual taxa.

According to the crustacean taxonomist Tin-Yam Chan, "The terms shrimp and prawn have no definite reference to any known taxonomic groups. Although the term shrimp is sometimes applied to smaller species, while prawn is more often used for larger forms, there is no clear distinction between both terms and their usage is often confused or even reverse in different countries or regions." Writing in 1980, L. B. Holthuis noted that the terms prawn and shrimp were used inconsistently "even within a single region", generalising that larger species fished commercially were generally called shrimp in the United States, and prawns in other English-speaking countries, although not without exceptions.

Much confusion surrounds the scope of the term shrimp. Part of the confusion originates with the word's association with smallness; many shrimp species are small, about 2 cm (0.79 in) long, but some shrimp exceed 25 cm (9.8 in), such as Penaeus monodon. The expression "jumbo shrimp" can be viewed as an oxymoron, a problem that does not exist with the commercial designation "jumbo prawns". Larger shrimp are more likely to be targeted commercially and are often referred to as prawns, particularly in the Commonwealth of Nations.

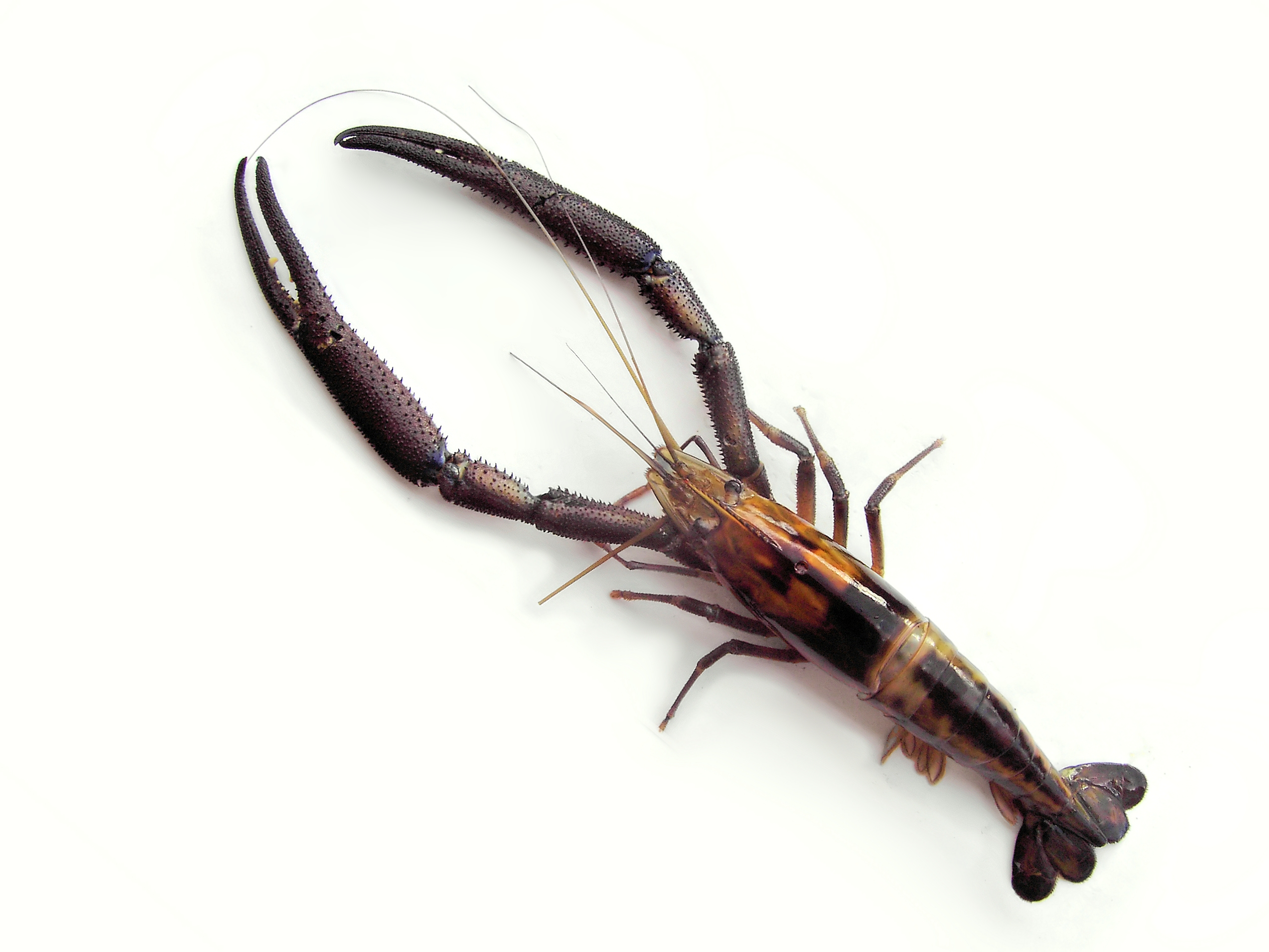
A bigclaw river shrimp from the Neotropics. Prawns are sometimes stated to be "large shrimp" or alternatively "freshwater shrimp", but this large-bodied, freshwater crustacean is a caridean shrimp, and is rarely referred to as a prawn.

The term shrimp originated around the 14th century with the Middle English shrimpe, akin to the Middle Low German schrempen, and meaning 'to contract or wrinkle'; and the Old Norse skorpna, meaning 'to shrivel up', or skreppa, meaning 'a thin person'. It is not clear where the term prawn originated, but early forms of the word surfaced in England in the early 15th century as prayne, praine and prane. According to the linguist Anatoly Liberman it is unclear how shrimp, in English, came to be associated with small, since no other language with Germanic origins associates shrimp with how large they are. "The same holds for Romance... it remains unclear in what circumstances the name was applied to the crustacean."

=== Taxonomy ===
Taxonomic studies in Europe on shrimp and prawns were shaped by the common shrimp and the common prawn, both found in huge numbers along the European coastlines. The common shrimp, Crangon crangon, was categorised in 1758 by Carl Linnaeus, and the common prawn, Palaemon serratus, was categorised in 1777 by Thomas Pennant. The common shrimp is a small burrowing species aligned with the notion of a shrimp as being something small, whereas the common prawn is much larger. The terms true shrimp or true prawn are sometimes used to mean what a particular person thinks is a shrimp or prawn. This varies with the person using the terms. But such terms are not normally used in the scientific literature, because the terms shrimp and prawn themselves lack scientific standing. Over the years the way shrimp and prawn are used has changed, and nowadays the terms are almost interchangeable. Although from time to time some biologists declare that certain common names should be confined to specific taxa, the popular use of these names seems to continue unchanged.

Shrimp are swimming crustaceans with long narrow muscular abdomens and long antennae. Unlike crabs and lobsters, shrimp have well-developed pleopods (swimmerets) and slender walking legs; they are more adapted for swimming than walking. Historically, it was the distinction between walking and swimming that formed the primary taxonomic division into the former suborders Natantia and Reptantia. Members of the Natantia (shrimp in the broader sense) were adapted for swimming while the Reptantia (crabs, lobsters, etc.) were adapted for crawling or walking. Some other groups also have common names that include the word "shrimp"; any small swimming crustacean resembling a shrimp tends to be called one, and a number of small-bodied crustacean groups not resembling shrimp are also referred to as shrimp.

Differences between shrimp, lobsters and crabs
shrimp	lobsters	crabs
Shrimp are slender with long muscular abdomens. They look somewhat like small lobsters, but not like crabs. The abdomens of crabs are small and short, whereas the abdomens of lobsters and shrimp are large and long. The lower abdomens of shrimp support pleopods which are well-adapted for swimming. The carapaces of crabs are wide and flat, whereas the carapaces of lobsters and shrimp are more cylindrical. The antennae of crabs are short, whereas the antennae of lobsters and shrimp are usually long, reaching more than twice the body length in some shrimp species.	Clawed lobsters (pictured left) and spiny lobsters (pictured right) are an intermediate evolutionary development between shrimp and crabs. They look somewhat like large versions of shrimp. Clawed lobsters have large claws while spiny lobsters do not, having instead spiny antennae and carapace. Some of the biggest decapods are lobsters. Like crabs, lobsters have robust legs and are highly adapted for walking on the seafloor, though they do not walk sideways. Some species have rudimentary pleopods, which give them some ability to swim, and like shrimp they can lobster with their tail to escape predators, but their primary mode of locomotion is walking, not swimming.	Crabs evolved from early shrimp, though they do not look like shrimp. Unlike shrimp, their abdomens are small, and they have short antennae and short carapaces that are wide and flat. They have prominent grasping claws as their front pair of limbs. Crabs are adapted for walking on the seafloor. They have robust legs and usually move about the seafloor by walking sideways. They have pleopods, but they use them as intromittent organs or to hold egg broods, not for swimming. Whereas shrimp and lobsters escape predators by lobstering, crabs cling to the seafloor and burrow into sediment. Compared to shrimp and lobsters, the carapaces of crabs are particularly heavy, hard and mineralized.

=== Fossils ===
Only 57 exclusively fossil species are known in the shrimp fossil record. The earliest dates from the Lower Jurassic, followed by specimens from the Cretaceous.

== Description ==
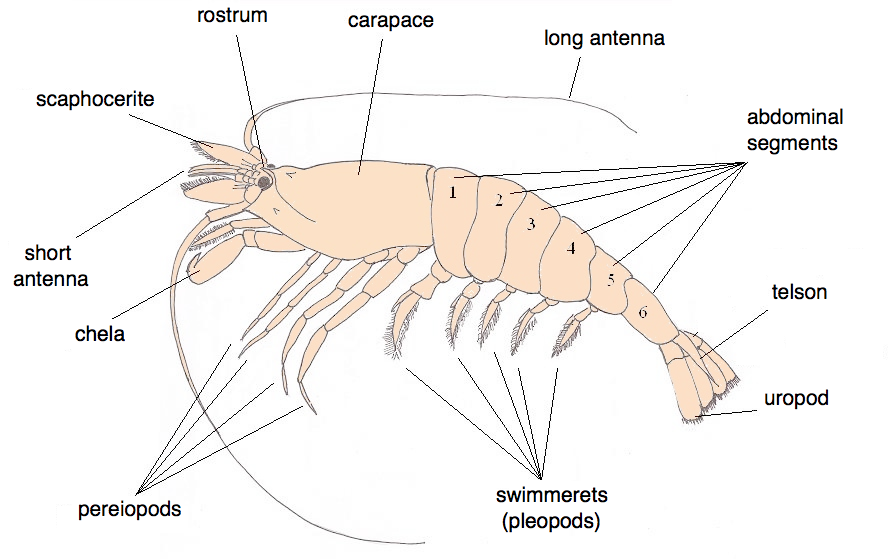
External anatomy of the common European shrimp, Crangon crangon

Shrimp can dart backwards by lobstering.

The following description refers mainly to the external anatomy of the common European shrimp, Crangon crangon, as a typical example of a decapod shrimp. The body of the shrimp is divided into two main parts: the head and thorax which are fused together to form the cephalothorax, and a long narrow abdomen. The shell which protects the cephalothorax is harder and thicker than the shell elsewhere on the shrimp and is called the carapace. The carapace typically surrounds the gills, through which water is pumped by the action of the mouthparts. The rostrum, eyes, whiskers and legs also issue from the carapace. The rostrum, from the Latin rōstrum meaning beak, looks like a beak or pointed nose at the front of the shrimp's head. It is a rigid forward extension of the carapace and can be used for attack or defense. It may also stabilize the shrimp when it swims backward. Two bulbous eyes on stalks sit either side of the rostrum. These are compound eyes which have panoramic vision and are very good at detecting movement. Two pairs of whiskers (antennae) also issue from the head. One of these pairs is very long and can be twice the length of the shrimp, while the other pair is quite short. The antennae have sensors on them which allow the shrimp to feel where they touch, and also allow them to "smell" or "taste" things by sampling the chemicals in the water. The long antennae help the shrimp orient itself with regard to its immediate surroundings, while the short antennae help assess the suitability of prey.

Eight pairs of appendages issue from the cephalothorax. The first three pairs, the maxillipeds, Latin for "jaw feet", are used as mouthparts. In Crangon crangon, the first pair, the maxillula, pumps water into the gill cavity. After the maxilliped come five more pairs of appendages, the pereiopods. These form the ten decapod legs. In Crangon crangon, the first two pairs of pereiopods have claws or chela. The chela can grasp food items and bring them to the mouth. They can also be used for fighting and grooming. The remaining four legs are long and slender, and are used for walking or perching.

The muscular abdomen has six segments and has a thinner shell than the carapace. Each segment has a separate overlapping shell, which can be transparent. The first five segments each have a pair of appendages on the underside, which are shaped like paddles and are used for swimming forward. The appendages are called pleopods or swimmerets, and can be used for purposes other than swimming. Some shrimp species use them for brooding eggs, others have gills on them for breathing, and the males in some species use the first pair or two for insemination. The sixth segment terminates in the telson flanked by two pairs of appendages called the uropods. The uropods allow the shrimp to swim backward, and function like rudders, steering the shrimp when it swims forward. Together, the telson and uropods form a splayed tail fan. If a shrimp is alarmed, it can flex its tail fan in a rapid movement. This results in a backward dart called the caridoid escape reaction (lobstering).

== Habitat ==
Shrimp are widespread, and can be found near the seafloor of most coasts and estuaries, as well as in rivers and lakes. There are numerous species, and usually there is a species adapted to any particular habitat. Most shrimp species are marine, although about a quarter of the described species are found in fresh water. Marine species are found at depths of up to 5,000 metres (16,000 ft), and from the tropics to the polar regions. Although shrimp are almost entirely fully aquatic, the two species of Merguia are semi-terrestrial and spend a significant part of their life on land in mangrove.

Habitats

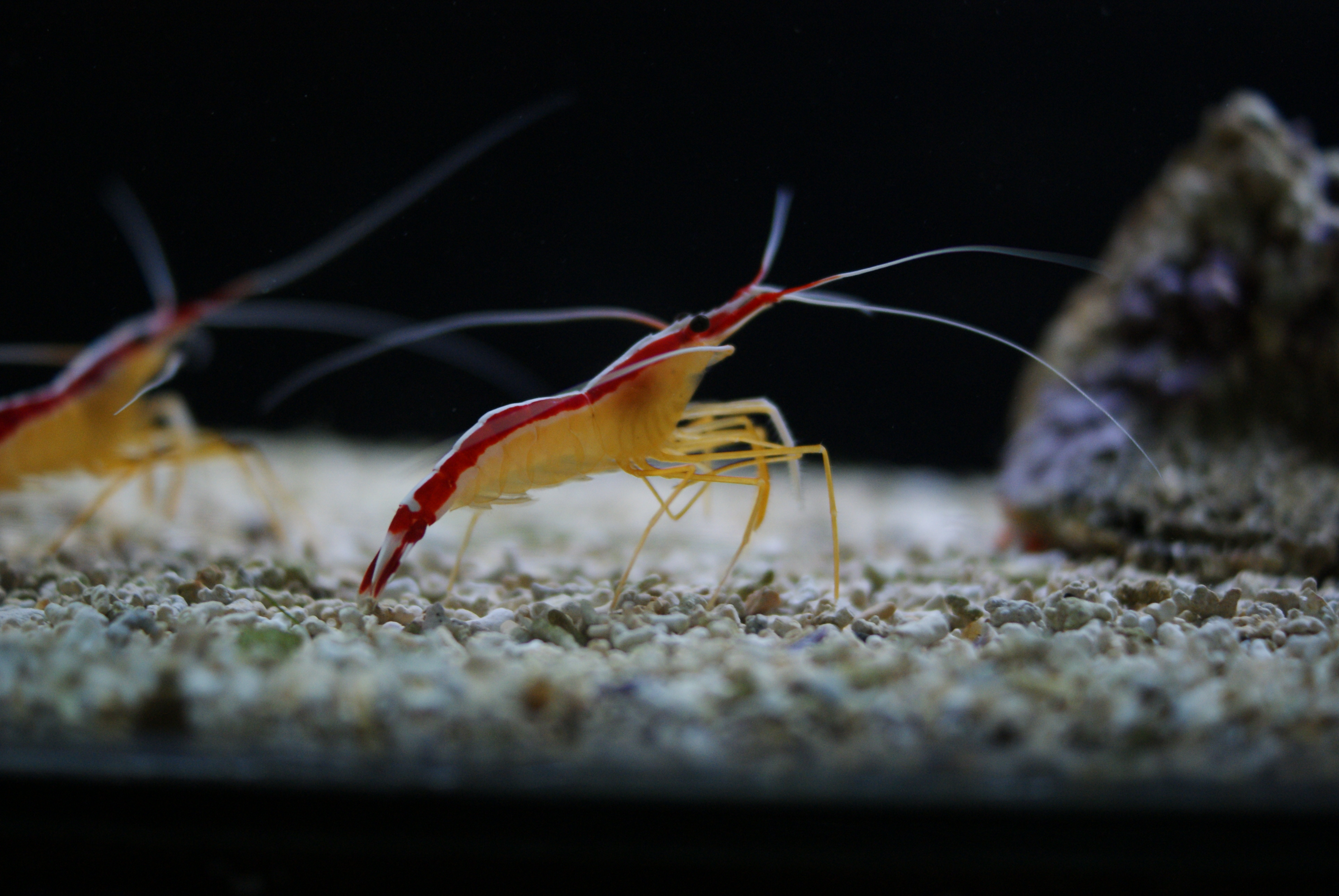
Most shrimp such as Lysmata amboinensis live in fairly shallow waters and use their "walking legs" to perch on the sea bottom.

Shrimp Aquarium – YouTube

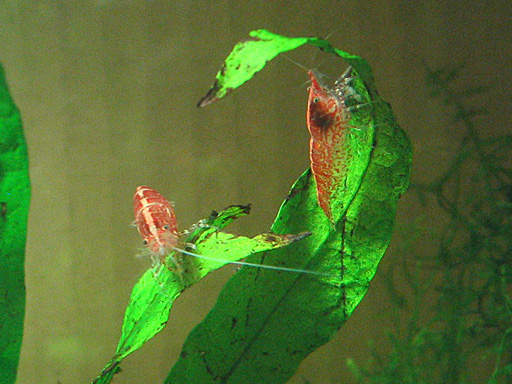
Other shrimp, like these cherry shrimp, perch on plant leaves

Red Cherry Shrimp – YouTube

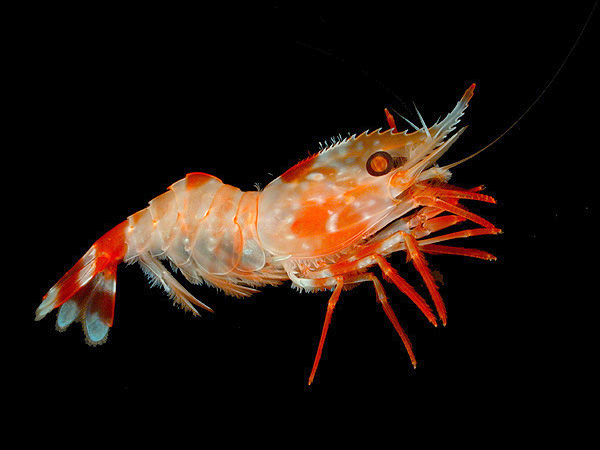
Some shrimp live in deep and dark waters, such as this Heterocarpus ensifer.

Window Washing Shrimp – YouTube

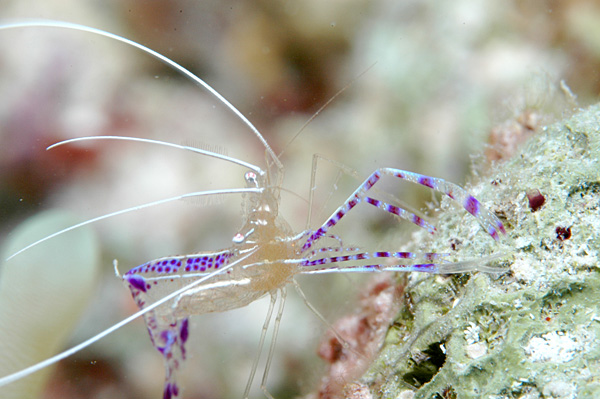
The delicate, transparent Pederson's shrimp lives with anemone hosts, and cleans parasites from fish.

Scorpion Fish being cleaned by Pederson Shrimp – YouTube

== Behaviour ==
There are many variations in the ways different types of shrimp look and behave. Even within the core group of caridean shrimp, the small delicate Pederson's shrimp (above) looks and behaves quite unlike the large commercial pink shrimp or the snapping pistol shrimp. The caridean family of pistol shrimp are characterized by big asymmetrical claws, the larger of which can produce a loud snapping sound. The family is diverse and worldwide in distribution, consisting of about 600 species. Colonies of snapping shrimp are a major source of noise in the ocean and can interfere with sonar and underwater communication. The small emperor shrimp has a symbiotic relationship with sea slugs and sea cucumbers, and may help keep them clear of ectoparasites.

Behaviour

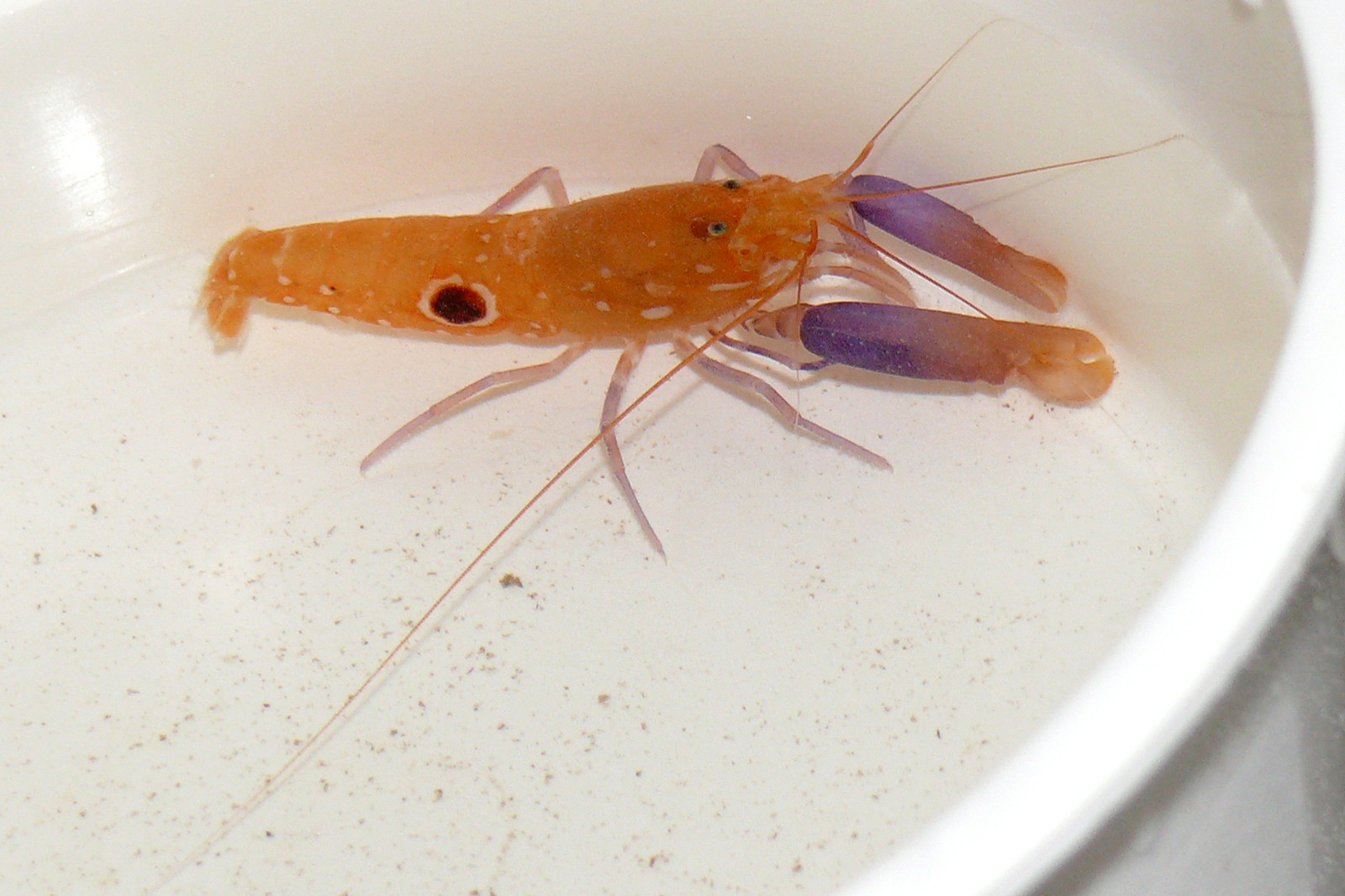
Pistol shrimp stun prey with "sonic booms", producing some of the loudest sounds in the ocean.

Pistol Shrimp sonic weapon – BBC: Weird Nature

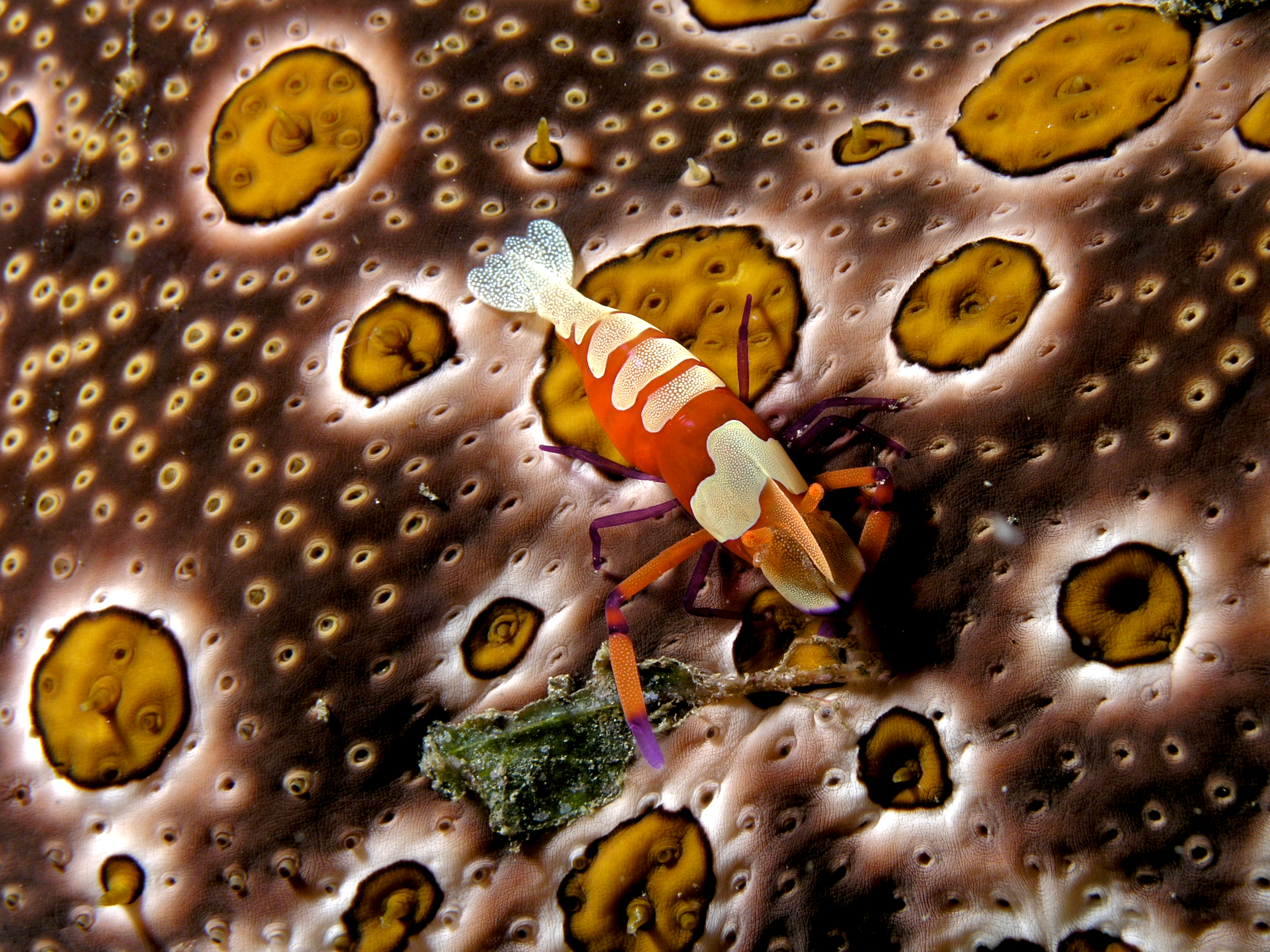
This small Periclimenes imperator emperor shrimp is perched on a sea cucumber with which it has a symbiotic relationship.

Emperor shrimp feeds while sea cucumber spawns YouTube

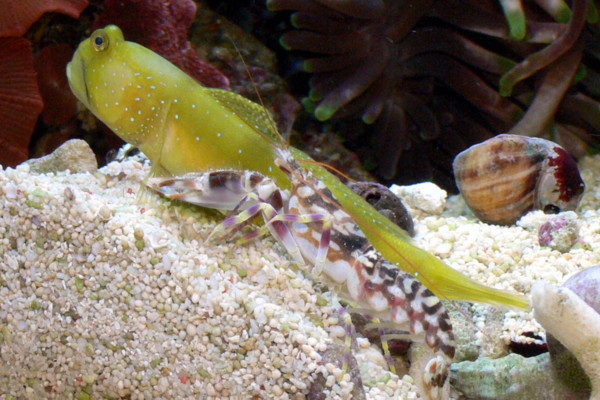
The blind tiger pistol shrimp can partner with a yellow watchman goby. The shrimp maintains a burrow for the pair and the goby is the lookout.

Living Together: Shrimp and Fish BBC: Trials of Life

Most shrimp are omnivorous, but some are specialised for particular modes of feeding. Some are filter feeders, using their setose (bristly) legs as a sieve; some scrape algae from rocks. Cleaner shrimp feed on the parasites and necrotic tissue of the reef fish they groom. Some species of shrimp are known to cannibalize others as well if other food sources are not readily available. In turn, shrimp are eaten by various animals, particularly fish and seabirds, and frequently host bopyrid parasites.

=== Mating ===
Females of the freshwater shrimp Caridina ensifera are capable of storing sperm from multiple partners, and thus can produce progeny with different paternities. Reproductive success of sires was found to correlate inversely with their genetic relatedness to the mother. This finding suggests that sperm competition and/or pre- and post-copulatory female choice occurs. Female choice may increase the fitness of progeny by reducing inbreeding depression that ordinarily results from the expression of homozygous deleterious recessive mutations.

== Species ==
=== Decapods ===
There is little agreement among taxonomists concerning the phylogeny of crustaceans. Within the decapods, "every study gives totally different results. Nor do even one of these studies match any of the rival morphology studies". Some taxonomists identify shrimp with the infraorder Caridea and prawns with the suborder Dendrobranchiata. While different experts give different answers, there is no disagreement that the caridean species are shrimp. There are over 3000 caridean species. Occasionally they are referred to as "true shrimp".

Traditionally, decapods were divided into two suborders: the Natantia (or swimmers) and the Reptantia (or walkers). The Natantia or swimmers included the shrimp. They were defined by their abdomen which, together with its appendages was well adapted for swimming. The Reptantia or walkers included the crabs and lobsters. These species have small abdominal appendages, but robust legs well adapted for walking. The Natantia was thought to be paraphyletic; that is, it was thought that originally all decapods were like shrimp.

However, classifications are now based on clades, and the paraphyletic suborder Natantia has been discontinued. "On this basis, taxonomic classifications now divide the order Decapoda into the two suborders: Dendrobranchiata for the largest shrimp clade, and Pleocyemata for all other decapods. The Pleocyemata are in turn divided into half a dozen infra-orders"

- The taxonomists De Grave and Fransen, 2011, recognise four major groups of shrimp: the suborder Dendrobranchiata and the infraorders Procarididea, Stenopodidea and Caridea". This group is identical to the traditional Natantia group, and contains decapods only.
- All shrimp of commercial interest belong to the Natantia. The FAO determine the categories and terminology used in the reporting of global fisheries. They define a shrimp as a "decapod crustacean of the suborder Natantia".
- According to the Codex Alimentarius Commission of the FAO and WHO: "The term shrimp (which includes the frequently used term prawn) refers to the species covered by the most recent edition of the FAO listing of shrimp, FAO Species Catalogue, Volume 1, Shrimps and prawns of the world, an annotated catalogue of species of interest to fisheries FAO Fisheries Synopsis No. 125." In turn, the Species Catalogue says the highest category it deals with is "the suborder Natantia of the order Crustacea Decapoda to which all shrimps and prawns belong".

Major shrimp groups of the Natantia
Order	Suborder	Infraorder	Image	Extant species	Description
Decapoda	Dendrobranchiata		Dendrobranchiata: Giant tiger prawn (Penaeus monodon)	533	Penaeid shrimp A particularly significant family in this suborder is the Penaeidae, often referred to as penaeid shrimp or penaeid prawn. Most commercially important species are in this family. See below. The species in this suborder tend to be larger than the caridean shrimp species below, and many are commercially important. They are sometimes referred to as prawns. Dendrobranchiata, such as the giant tiger prawn pictured, typically have three pairs of claws, though their claws are less conspicuous than those of other shrimp. They do not brood eggs like the caridean, but shed them directly into the water. Their gills are branching, whereas the gills of caridean shrimp are lamellar. The segments on their abdomens are even-sized, and there is no pronounced bend in the abdomen.
Decapoda	Pleocyemata	Caridea	Caridea: Pink shrimp (Pandalus borealis)	3438	The numerous species in this infraorder are known as caridean shrimp, though only a few are commercially important. They are usually small, nocturnal, difficult to find (they burrow in the sediment), and of interest mainly to marine biologists. Caridean shrimp, such as the pink shrimp pictured, typically have two pairs of claws. Female carideans attach eggs to their pleopods and brood them there. The second abdominal segment overlaps both the first and the third segment, and the abdomen shows a pronounced caridean bend.
Decapoda	Pleocyemata	Procarididea	Procarididea: Procaris ascensionis	6	A minor sister group to the Caridea (immediately above)
Decapoda	Pleocyemata	Stenopodidea		71	Known as boxer shrimp, the members of this infraorder are often cleaner shrimp. Their third pair of walking legs (pereiopods) are greatly enlarged. The banded coral shrimp (pictured) is popular in aquariums. The Stenopodidea are a much smaller group than the Dendrobranchia and Caridea, and have no commercial importance.

Other decapod crustaceans also called shrimp, are the ghost or mud shrimp belonging to the infra-order Thalassinidea. In Australia they are called yabbies. The monophyly of the group is not certain; recent studies have suggested dividing the group into two infraorders, Gebiidea and Axiidea.

=== Non-decapods ===
A shrimp seems to be almost any crustacean that isn't a lobster, barnacle, or crab

— Greg Jensen

A wide variety of non-decapod crustaceans are also commonly referred to as shrimp. This includes the brine shrimp, clam shrimp, fairy shrimp and tadpole shrimp belonging to the branchiopods, the lophogastridan shrimp, opossum shrimp and skeleton shrimp belonging the Malacostraca; and seed shrimp which are ostracods. Many of these species look quite unlike the commercial decapod shrimp that are eaten as seafood. For example, skeleton shrimp have short legs and a slender tail like a scorpion tail, fairy shrimp swim upside down with swimming appendages that look like leaves, and the tiny seed shrimp have bivalved carapaces which they can open or close. Krill resemble miniature shrimp, and are sometimes called "krill shrimp".

Other species groups commonly known as shrimp
Class	Image	Group	Extant species	Description
Branchiopoda	Branchiopoda comes from the Greek branchia meaning gills, and pous meaning feet. They have gills on their feet or mouthparts.			
Branchiopoda		brine shrimp	8	Brine shrimp belong to the genus Artemia. They live in inland saltwater lakes in unusually high salinities, which protects them from most predators. They produce eggs, called cysts, which can be stored in a dormant state for long periods and then hatched on demand. This has led to the extensive use of brine shrimp as fish feed in aquaculture. Brine shrimp are sold as novelty gifts under the marketing name Sea-Monkeys.
Branchiopoda		clam shrimp	150	Clam shrimp belong to the group Conchostraca. These freshwater shrimp have a hinged bivalved carapace which can open and close.
Branchiopoda		fairy shrimp	300	Fairy shrimp belong to the class Anostraca. These 1–10 cm long freshwater or brackish shrimp have no carapace. They swim upside down with their belly uppermost, with swimming appendages that look like leaves. Most fairy shrimp are herbivores, and eat only the algae in the plankton. Their eggs can survive drought and temperature extremes for years, reviving and hatching after the rain returns.
Branchiopoda		tadpole shrimp	20	Tadpole shrimp belong to the family Notostraca. These living fossils have not much changed since the Triassic. They are drought-resistant and can be found preying on fairy shrimp and small fish at the bottom of shallow lakes and temporary pools. The longtail tadpole shrimp (pictured) has three eyes and up to 120 legs with gills on them. It lives for 20–90 days. Different populations can be bisexual, unisexual or hermaphroditic.
Malacostraca	Malacostraca comes from the Greek malakós meaning soft and óstrakon meaning shell. The name is misleading, since normally the shell is hard, and is soft only briefly after moulting.			
Malacostraca		Lophogastrida	56	These marine pelagic shrimp make up the order Lophogastrida. They mostly inhabit relatively deep pelagic waters throughout the world. Like the related opossum shrimp, females lophogastrida carry a brood pouch.
Malacostraca		mantis shrimp	400	Mantis shrimp, so called because they resemble a praying mantis and a shrimp, make up the order Stomatopoda. They grow up to 38 cm (15 in) long, and can be vividly coloured. Some have powerful spiked claws which they punch into their prey, stunning, spearing and dismembering them. They have been called "thumb splitters" because of the severe gashes they can inflict if handled carelessly.
Malacostraca		opossum shrimp	1,000	Opossum shrimp belong to the order Mysida. They are called opossum shrimp because the females carry a brood pouch. Usually less than 3 cm long, they are not closely related to caridean or penaeid shrimp. They are widespread in marine waters, and are also found in some brackish and freshwater habitats in the Northern hemisphere. Marine mysids can form large swarms and are an important source of food for many fish. Some freshwater mysids are found in groundwater and anchialine caves.
Malacostraca		skeleton shrimp		Skeleton shrimp, sometimes known as ghost shrimp, are amphipods. Their threadlike slender bodies allow them to virtually disappear among fine filaments in seaweed. Males are usually much larger than females. For a good account of a specific species, see Caprella mutica.
Ostracoda	Ostracod comes from the Greek óstrakon meaning shell. In this case, the shells are in two parts, like those of bivalves or clams.			
Ostracoda		seed shrimp	13,000	Seed shrimp make up the class Ostracoda. This is a class of numerous small crustacean species which look like seeds, typically about one millimetre (0.04 in) in size. Their carapace looks like a clam shell, with two parts held together by a hinge to allow the shell to open and close. Some marine seed shrimp drift as pelagic plankton, but most live on the sea floor and burrow in the upper sediment layer. There are also freshwater and terrestrial species. The class includes carnivores, herbivores, filter feeders and scavengers.

Some mantis shrimp are a foot long, and have bulging eyes, a flattened tail and formidable claws equipped with clubs or sharp spikes, which it can use to knock out its opponents.

Examples of non-decapod "shrimp"

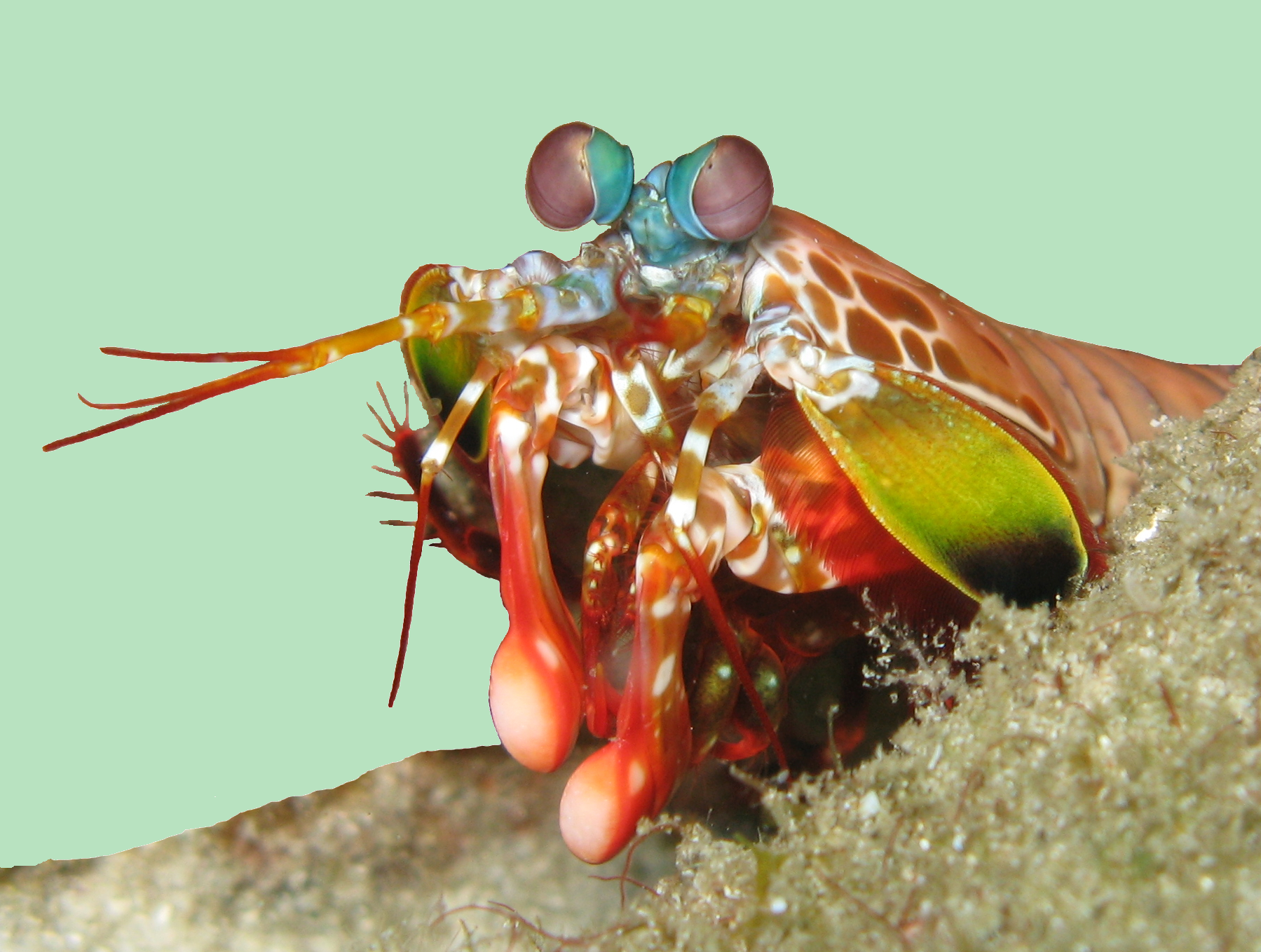
Some mantis shrimp knock prey out with powerful punches, and can crack a clam open.

Mantis Shrimp Destroys Clam – YouTube

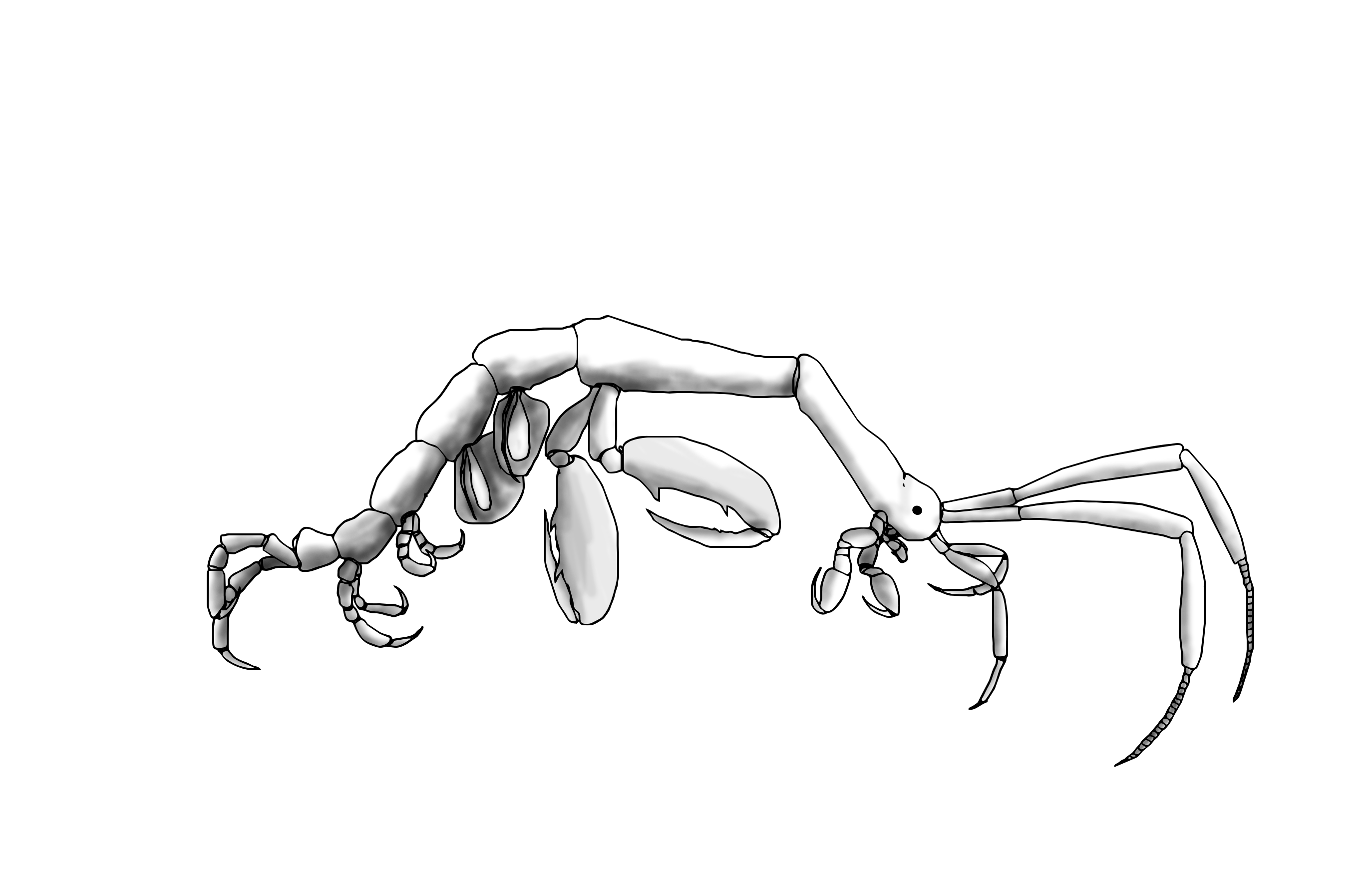
Skeleton shrimp have threadlike slender bodies

Skeleton shrimp – YouTube

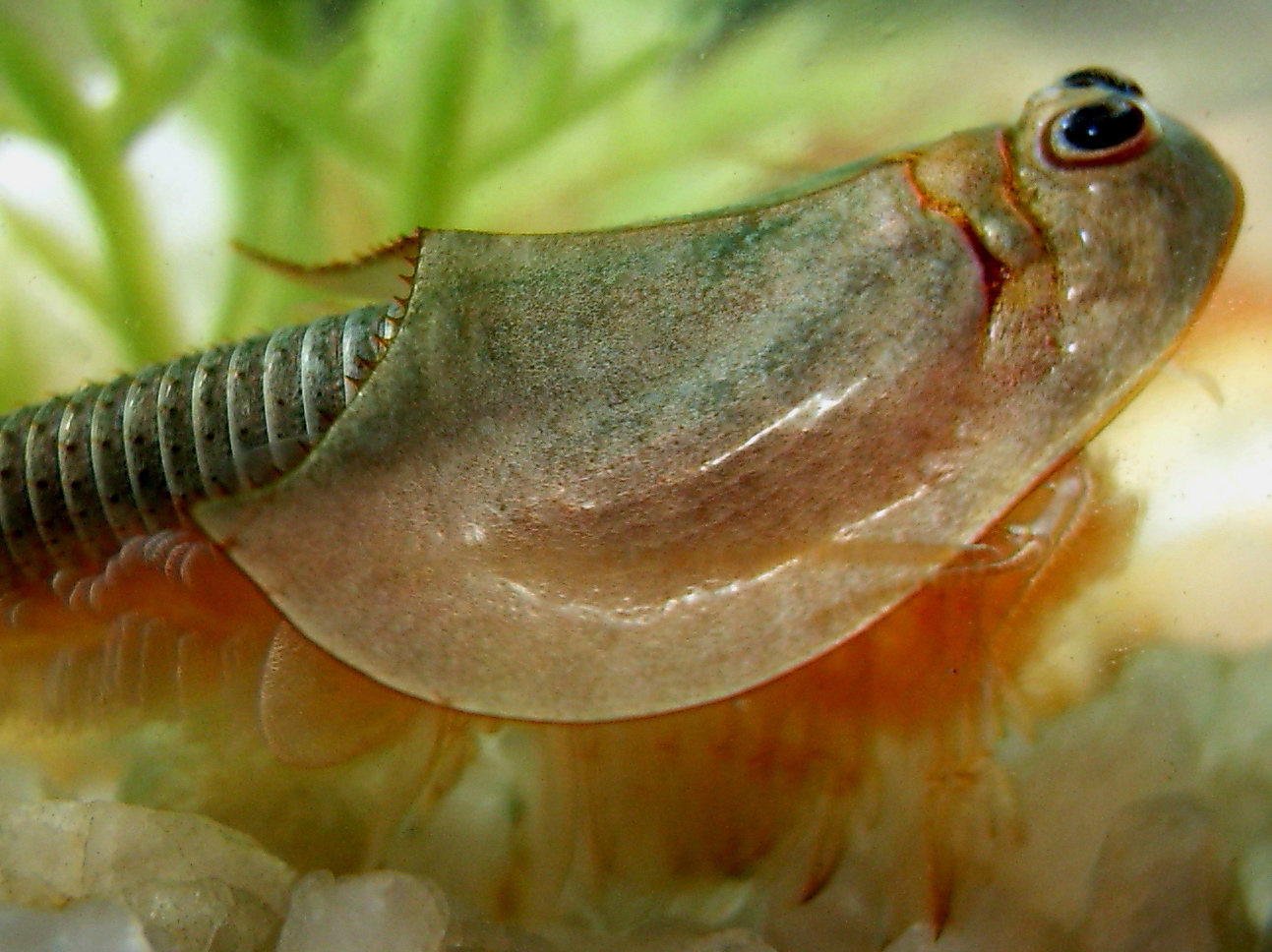
Tadpole shrimp can have up to 120 swimming legs

Triops – YouTube

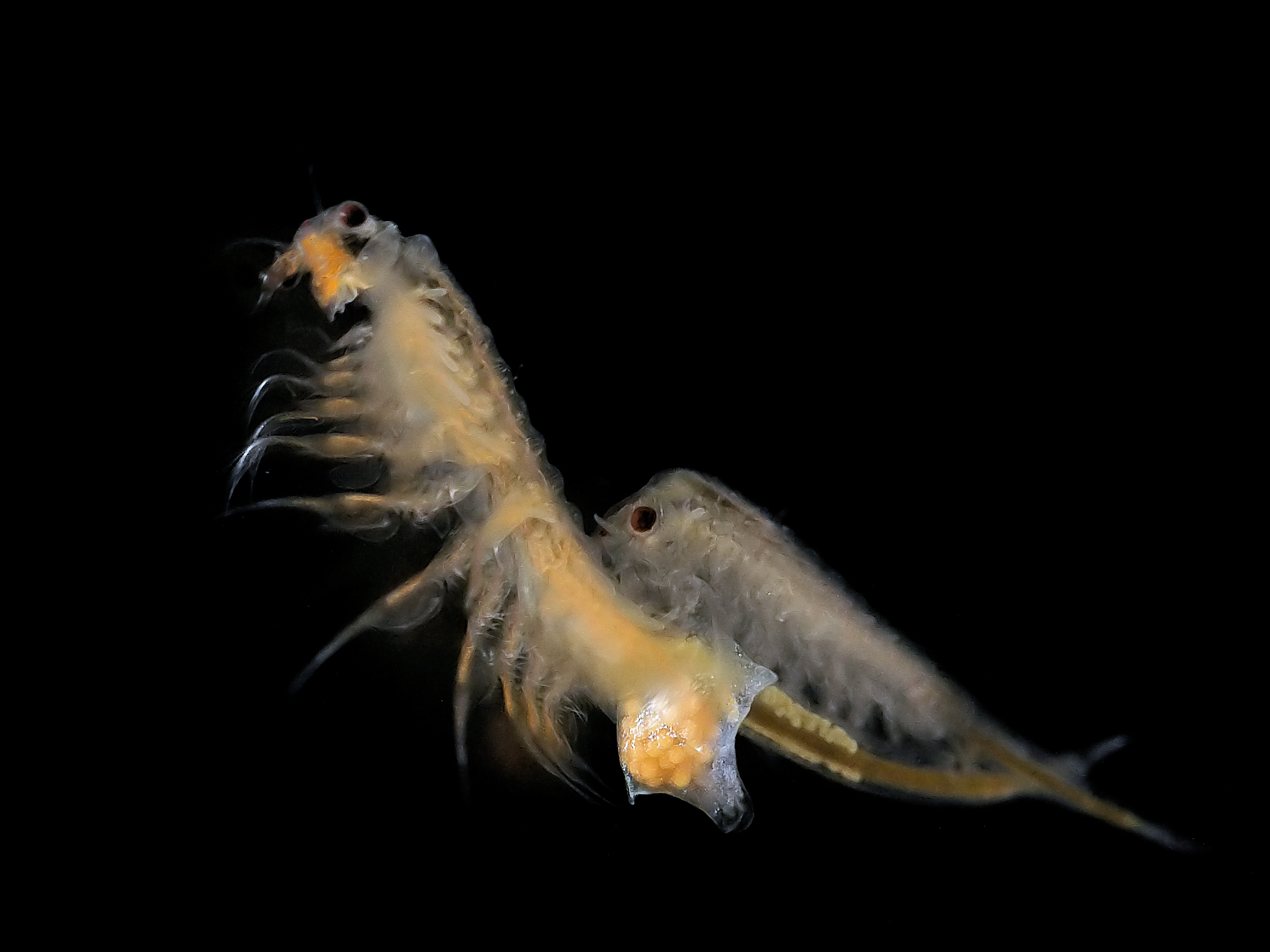
Some branchiopods, like this brine shrimp, have eggs which survive prolonged drought conditions.

Branchiopod shrimp – YouTube

== Human uses ==
=== History ===
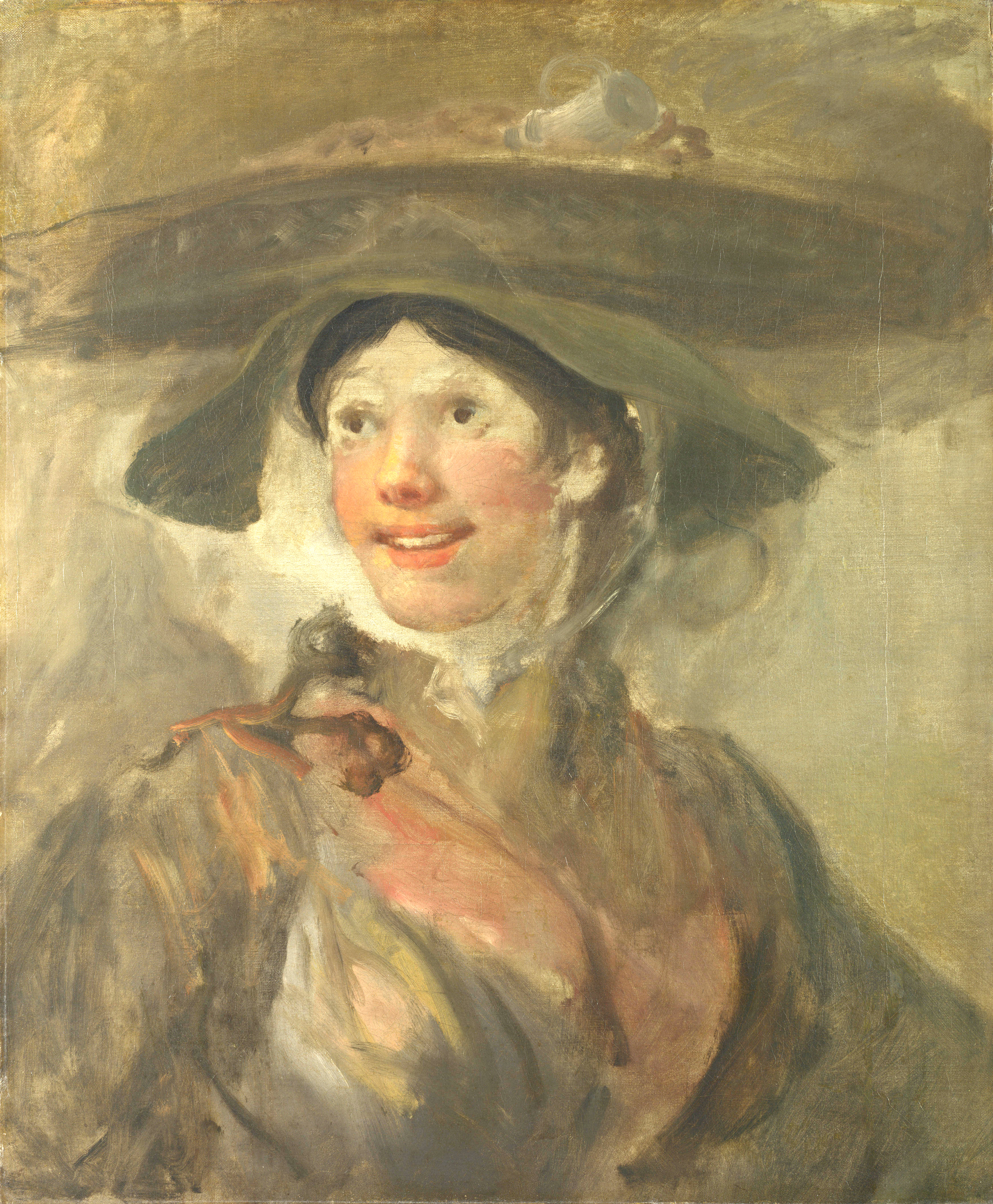
The Shrimp Girl by William Hogarth, circa 1740–1745, balances on her head a large basket of shrimp and mussels, which she is selling on the streets of London

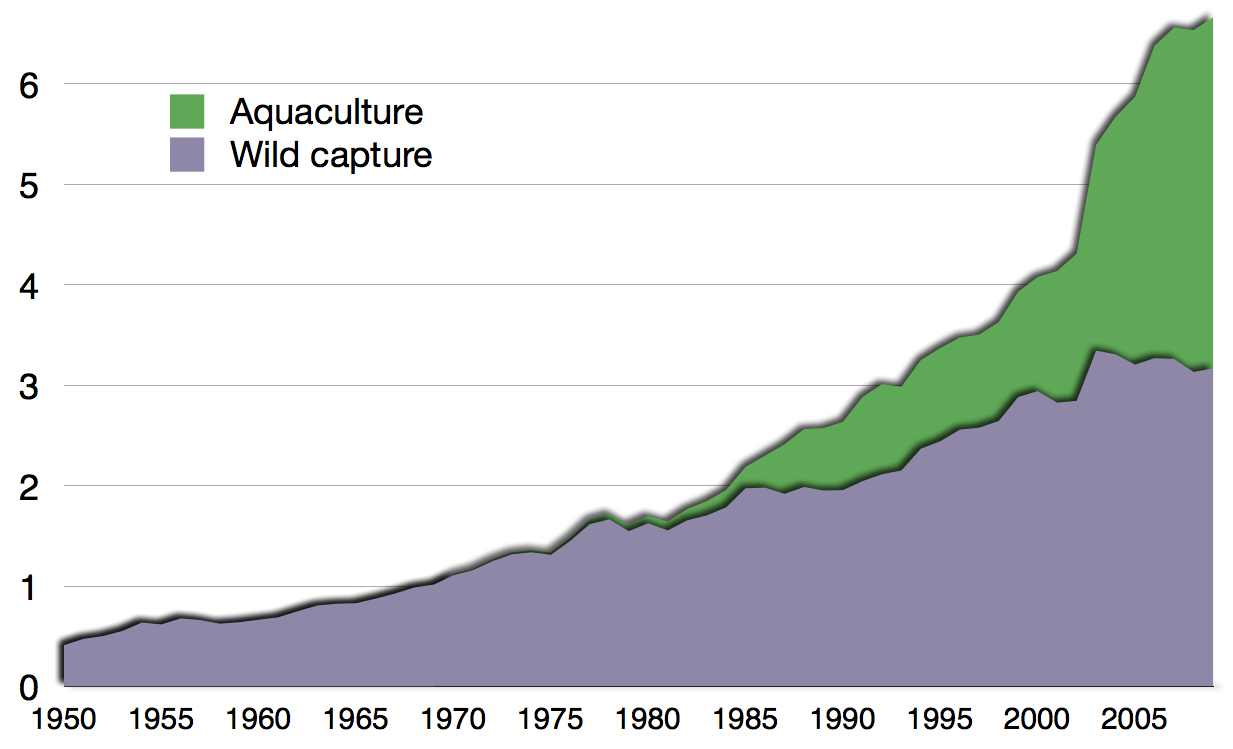
Commercial production of shrimps (and prawns) in million tonnes as reported by the FAO, 1950–2009

In 1991, archeologists suggested that ancient raised paved areas near the coast in Chiapas, Mexico, were platforms used for drying shrimp in the sun, and that adjacent clay hearths were used to dry the shrimp when there was no sun. The evidence was circumstantial, because the chitinous shells of shrimp are so thin they degrade rapidly, leaving no fossil remains. In 1985 Quitmyer and others found direct evidence dating back to 600 AD for shrimping off the southeastern coast of North America, by successfully identifying shrimp from the archaeological remains of their mandibles (jaws). Clay vessels with shrimp decorations have been found in the ruins of Pompeii. In the 3rd century AD, the Greek author Athenaeus wrote in his literary work, Deipnosophistae; "... of all fish the daintiest is a young shrimp in fig leaves."

In North America, indigenous peoples of the Americas captured shrimp and other crustaceans in fishing weirs and traps made from branches and Spanish moss, or used nets woven with fibre beaten from plants. At the same time early European settlers, oblivious to the "protein-rich coasts" all about them, starved from lack of protein. In 1735 beach seines were imported from France, and Cajun fishermen in Louisiana started catching white shrimp and drying them in the sun, as they still do today. In the mid nineteenth century, Chinese immigrants arrived for the California Gold Rush, many from the Pearl River Delta where netting small shrimp had been a tradition for centuries. Some immigrants starting catching shrimp local to San Francisco Bay, particularly the small inch long Crangon franciscorum. These shrimp burrow into the sand to hide, and can be present in high numbers without appearing to be so. The catch was dried in the sun and was exported to China or sold to the Chinese community in the United States. This was the beginning of the American shrimping industry. Overfishing and pollution from gold mine tailings resulted in the decline of the fishery. It was replaced by a penaeid white shrimp fishery on the South Atlantic and Gulf coasts. These shrimp were so abundant that beaches were piled with windrows from their moults. Modern industrial shrimping methods originated in this area.

"For shrimp to develop into one of the world's most popular foods, it took the simultaneous development of the otter trawl... and the internal combustion engine." Shrimp trawling can capture shrimp in huge volumes by dragging a net along the seafloor. Trawling was first recorded in England in 1376, when King Edward III received a request that he ban this new and destructive way of fishing. In 1583, the Dutch banned shrimp trawling in estuaries.

Diesel engines were adapted for use in shrimp boats in the 1920s. Power winches were connected to the engines, and only small crews were needed to rapidly lift heavy nets on board and empty them. Shrimp boats became larger, faster, and more capable. New fishing grounds could be explored, trawls could be deployed in deeper offshore waters, and shrimp could be tracked and caught round the year, instead of seasonally as in earlier times. Larger boats trawled offshore and smaller boats worked bays and estuaries. By the 1960s, steel and fibreglass hulls further strengthened shrimp boats, so they could trawl heavier nets, and steady advances in electronics, radar, sonar, and GPS resulted in more sophisticated and capable shrimp fleets.

As shrimp fishing methods industrialised, parallel changes were happening in the way shrimp were processed. "In the 19th century, sun dried shrimp were largely replaced by canneries. In the 20th century, the canneries were replaced with freezers."

In the 1970s, significant shrimp farming was initiated, particularly in China. The farming accelerated during the 1980s as the quantity of shrimp demand exceeded the quantity supplied, and as excessive bycatch and threats to endangered sea turtles became associated with trawling for wild shrimp. In 2007, the production of farmed shrimp exceeded the capture of wild shrimp.

=== Commercial species ===
Although there are thousands of species of shrimp worldwide, only about 20 of these species are commercially significant. The following table contains the principal commercial shrimp, the seven most harvested species. All of them are decapods; most of them belong to the Dendrobranchiata and four of them are penaeid shrimp.

Principal commercial shrimp species
Group	Common name	Scientific name	Description	Max length (mm)	Depth (m)	Habitat	FAO	WoRMS	2010 production (thousand tonnes)		
Group	Common name	Scientific name	Description	Max length (mm)	Depth (m)	Habitat	FAO	WoRMS	wild	farmed	total
Dendrobranchiata	Whiteleg shrimp	Litopenaeus vannamei (Boone, 1931)	The most extensively farmed species of shrimp.	230	0–72	marine, estuarine			1	2721	2722
Dendrobranchiata	Giant tiger prawn	Penaeus monodon Fabricius, 1798		336	0–110	marine, estuarine			210	782	992
Dendrobranchiata	Akiami paste shrimp	Acetes japonicus Kishinouye, 1905	Most intensively fished species. They are small with black eyes and red spots on the uropods. Only a small amount is sold fresh, most is dried, salted or fermented.	30	shallow	marine			574		574
Dendrobranchiata	Southern rough shrimp	Trachysalambria curvirostris (Stimpson, 1860)	Easier to catch at night, and fished only in waters less than 60 m (200 ft) deep. Most of the harvest is landed in China.	98	13–150	marine			294		294
Dendrobranchiata	Fleshy prawn	Fenneropenaeus chinensis (Osbeck, 1765)	Trawled in Asia where it is sold frozen. Exported to Western Europe. Cultured by Japan and South Korea in ponds.	183	90–180	marine			108	45	153
Dendrobranchiata	Banana prawn	Fenneropenaeus merguiensis (De Man, 1888)	Typically trawled in the wild and frozen, with most catches made by Indonesia. Commercially important in Australia, Pakistan and the Persian Gulf. Cultured in Indonesia and Thailand. In India it tends to be confused with Fenneropenaeus indicus, so its economic status is unclear.	240	10–45	marine, estuarine			93	20	113
Caridea	Northern prawn	Pandalus borealis (Krøyer, 1838)	Widely fished since the early 1900s in Norway, and later in other countries following Johan Hjort's practical discoveries of how to locate them. They have a short life which contributes to a variable stock on a yearly basis. They are not considered overfished.	165	20–1380	marine			361		361
All other species									1490	220	1710
Combined total									3129	3788	6917

=== Fishing ===
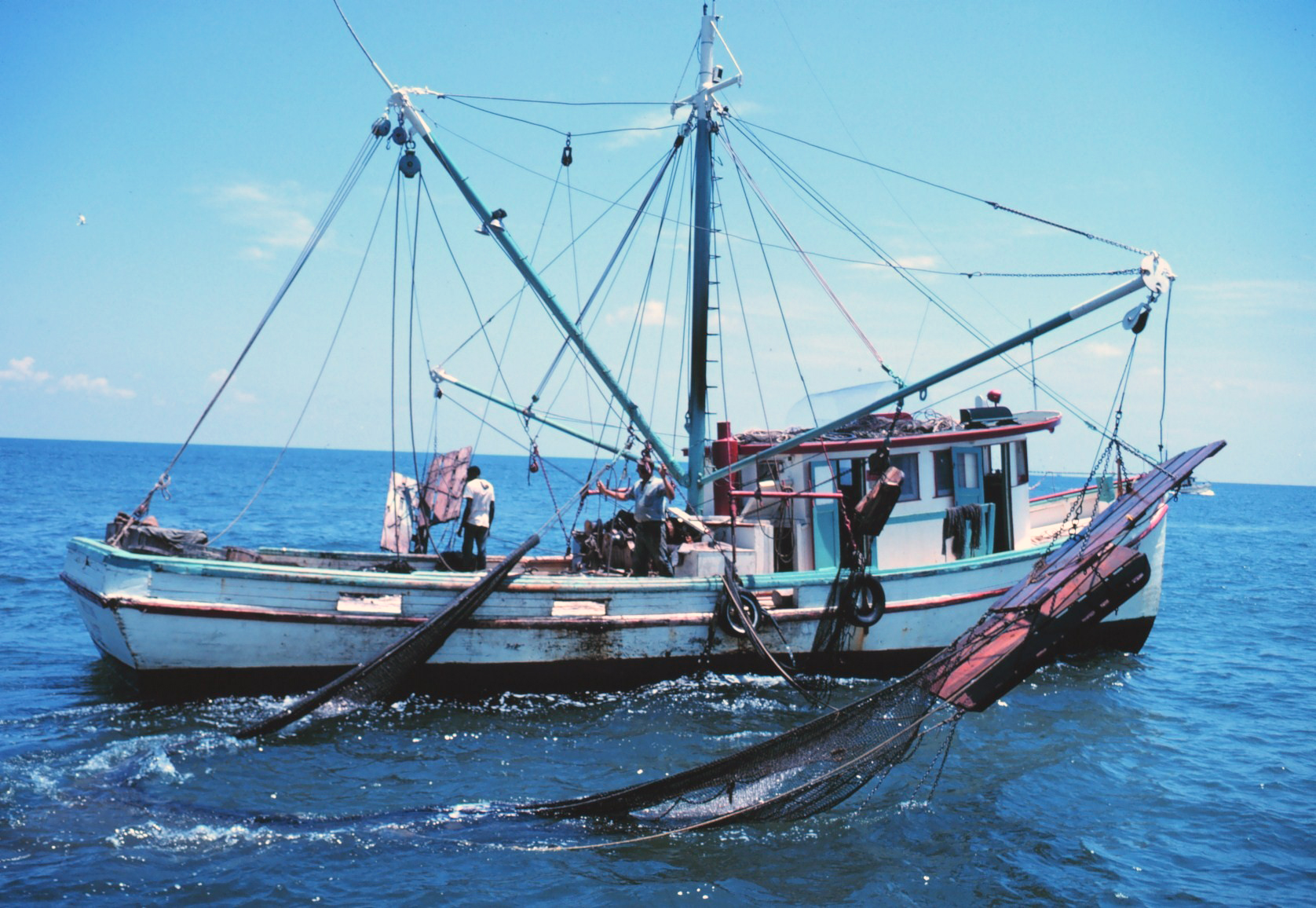
Double-rigged shrimp trawler with one net up and the other being brought aboard

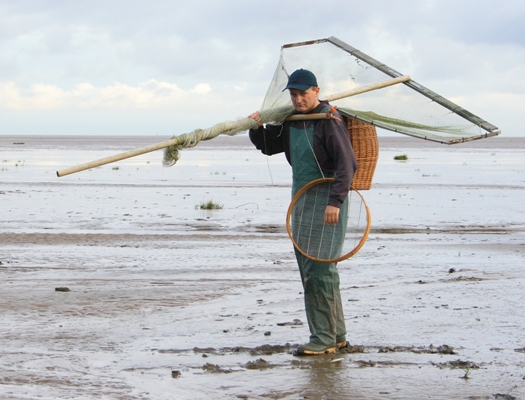
Traditional shrimper with a shrimp net

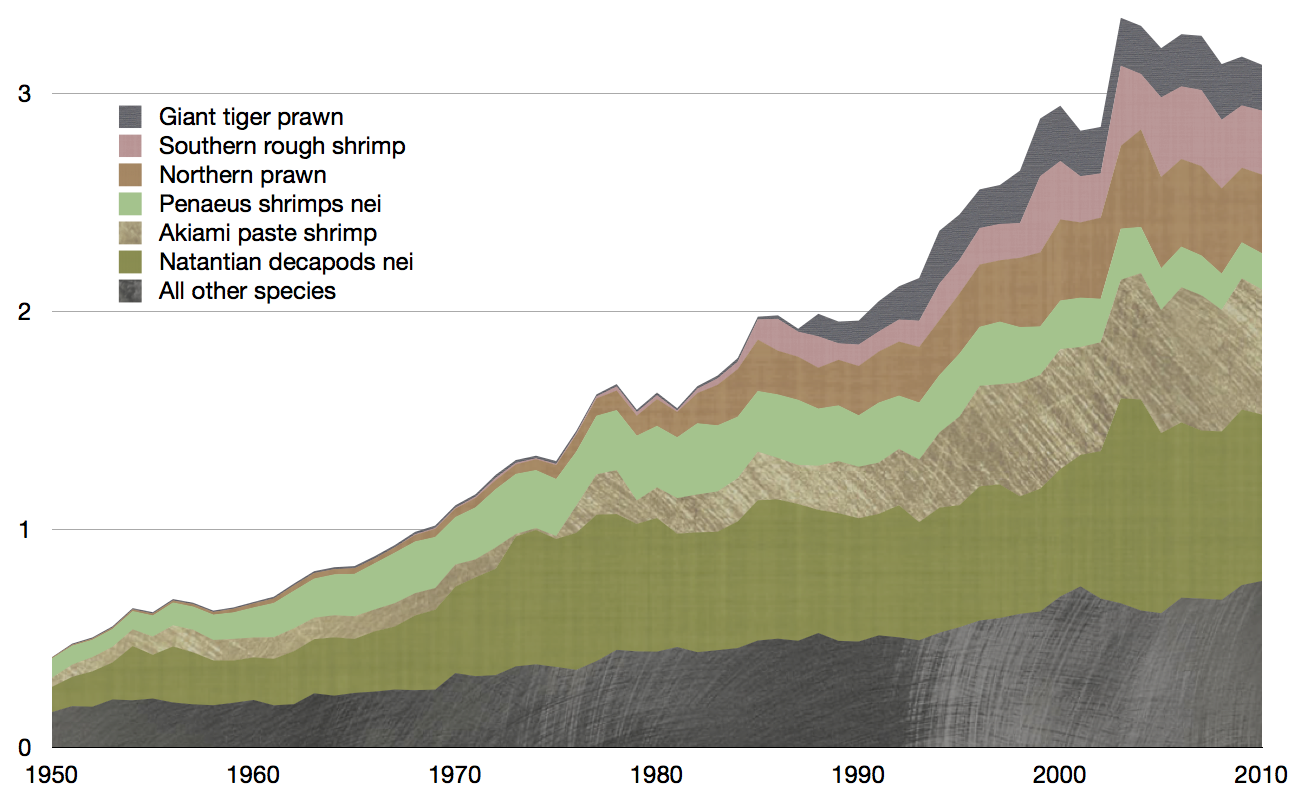
Global wild capture, 1950–2010, in million tonnes, as reported by the FAO

Commercial techniques for catching wild shrimp include otter trawls, seines and shrimp baiting. A system of nets is used when trawling. Baited traps are common in parts of the Pacific Northwest.

Shrimp trawling can result in very high incidental catch rates of non-target species. In 1997, the FAO found discard rates up to 20 pounds for every pound of shrimp. The world average was 5.7 pounds for every pound of shrimp. Trawl nets in general, and shrimp trawls in particular, have been identified as sources of mortality for species of finfish and cetaceans. Bycatch is often discarded dead or dying by the time it is returned to the sea, and may alter the ecological balance in discarded regions. Worldwide, shrimp trawl fisheries generate about 2% of the world's catch of fish in weight, but result in more than one third of the global bycatch total.

The most extensively fished species are the akiami paste shrimp, the northern prawn, the southern rough shrimp, and the giant tiger prawn. Together these four species account for nearly half of the total wild capture. In recent years, the global capture of wild shrimp has been overtaken by the harvest from farmed shrimp.

=== Farming ===
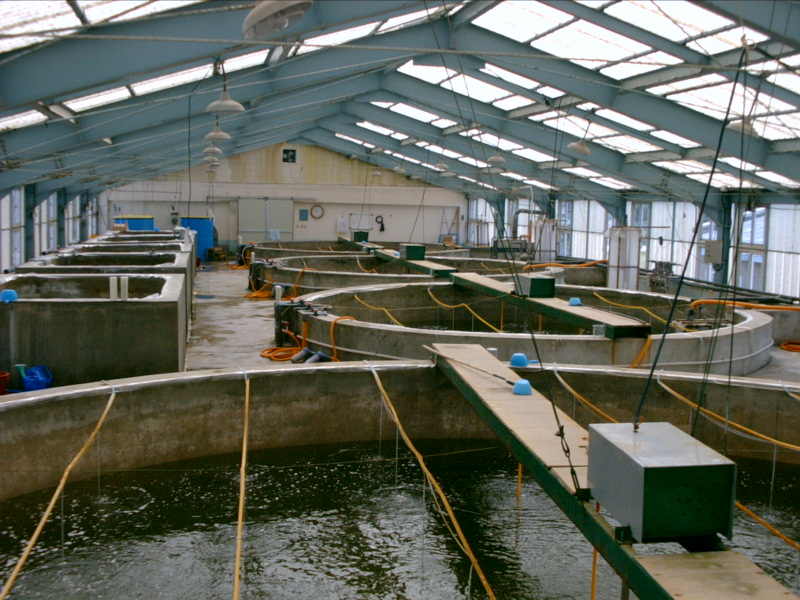
Tanks in a shrimp hatchery

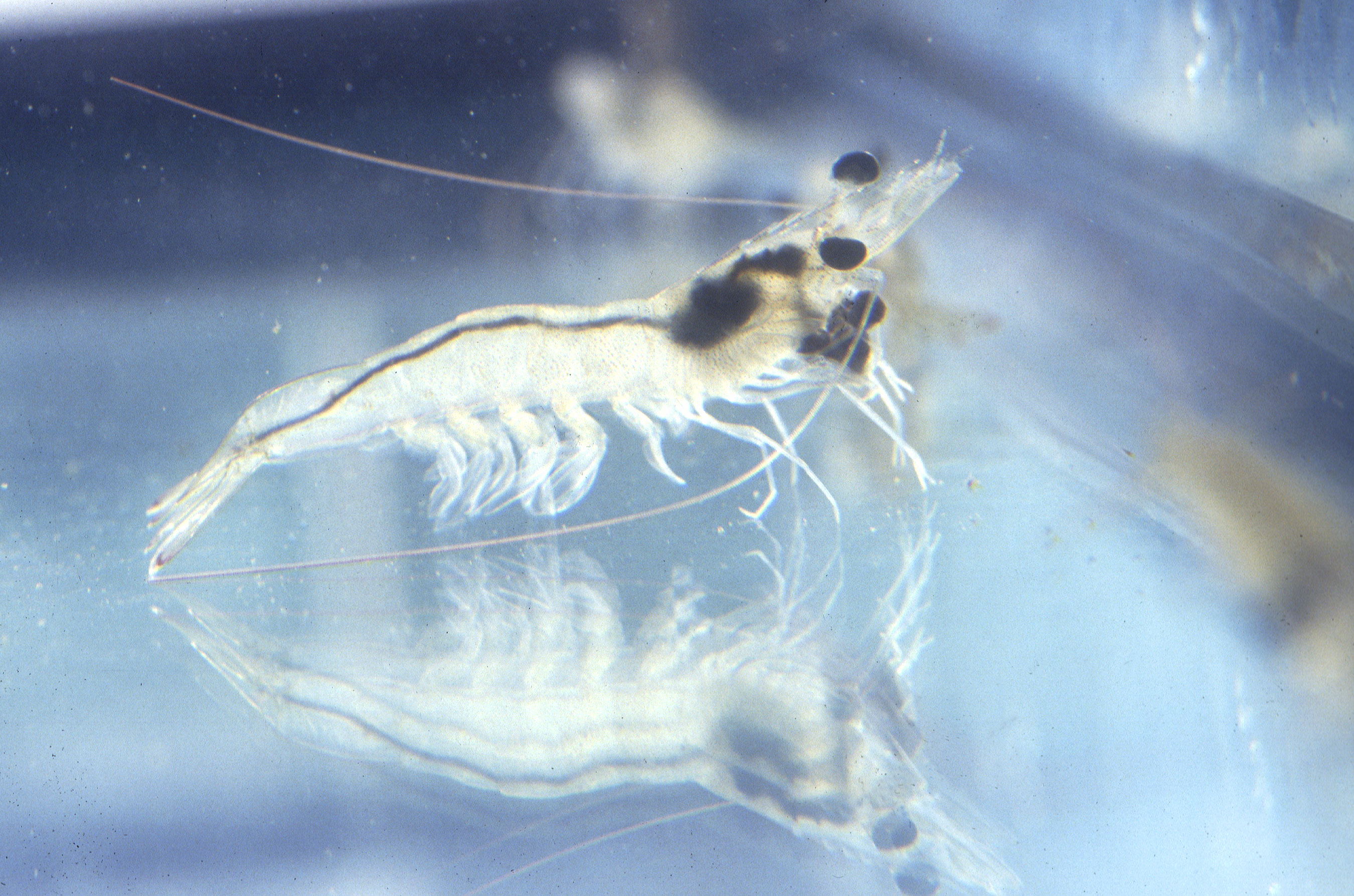
The whiteleg shrimp (juvenile shown) has become the preferred species for shrimp farming.

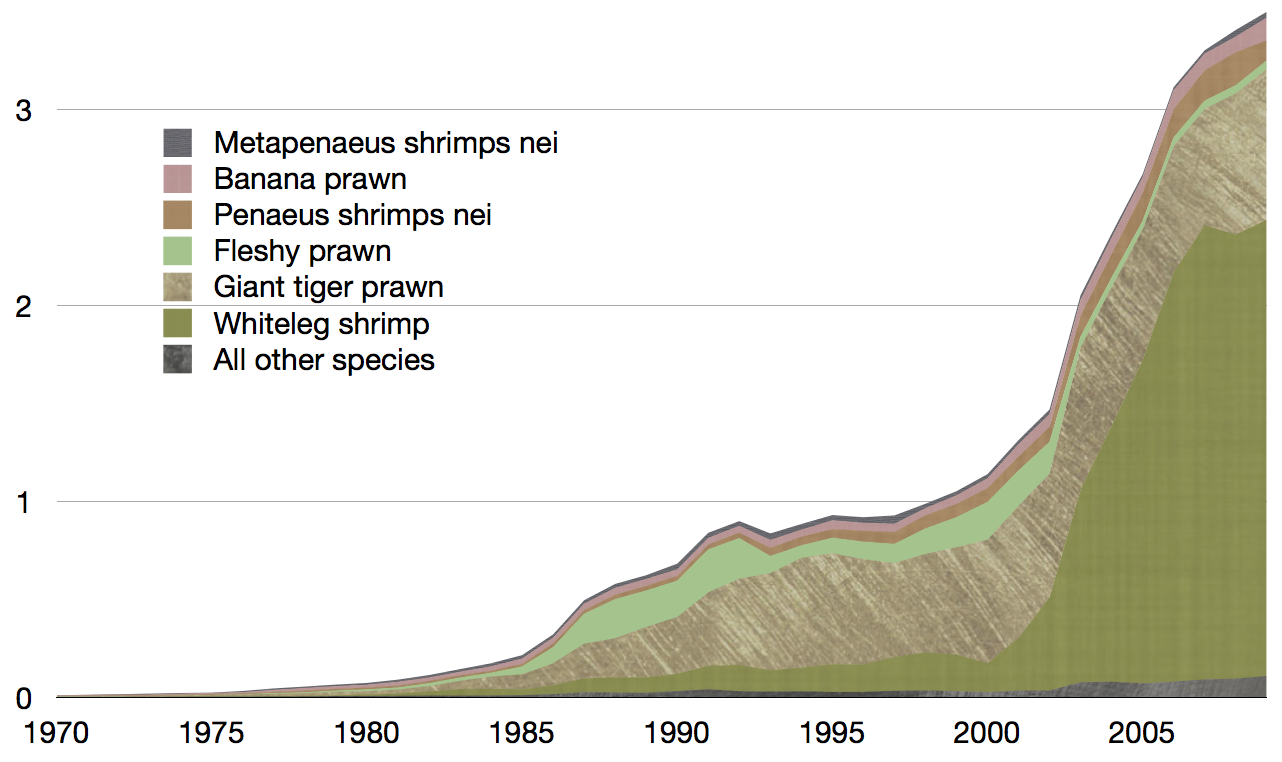
Global aquaculture production 1970–2009, in million tonnes, as reported by the FAO

A shrimp farm is an aquaculture business for the cultivation of marine shrimp or prawns for human consumption. Commercial shrimp farming began in the 1970s, and production grew steeply, particularly to match the market demands of the United States, Japan and Western Europe. The total global production of farmed shrimp reached more than 1.6 million tonnes in 2003, representing a value of nearly 9 billion U.S. dollars. About 75% of farmed shrimp are produced in Asia, in particular in China, Thailand, Indonesia, India and Vietnam. The other 25% are produced mainly in Latin America, where Brazil is the largest producer. By 2016, the largest exporting nation is India, followed by Ecuador, Thailand, Indonesia and China.

As can be seen from the global production chart on the left, significant aquaculture production started slowly in the 1970s and then rapidly expanded during the 1980s. After a lull in growth during the 1990s, due to pathogens, production took off again and by 2007 exceeded the capture from wild fisheries. By 2010, the aquaculture harvest was 3.9 million tonnes, compared to 3.1 million tonnes for the capture of wild shrimp.

In the earlier years of marine shrimp farming the preferred species was the large giant tiger prawn. This species is reared in circular holding tanks where they think they are in the open ocean, and swim in "never ending migration" around the circumference of the tank. In 2000, global production was 630,984 tonnes, compared to only 146,362 tonnes for whiteleg shrimp. Subsequently, these positions reversed, and by 2010 the production of giant tiger prawn increased modestly to 781,581 tonnes while whiteleg shrimp rocketed nearly twenty-fold to 2,720,929 tonnes. The whiteleg shrimp is currently the dominant species in shrimp farming. It is a moderately large shrimp reaching a total length of 230 mm (9"), and is particularly suited to farming because it "breeds well in captivity, can be stocked at small sizes, grows fast and at uniform rates, has comparatively low protein requirements... and adapts well to variable environmental conditions." In China, prawns are cultured along with sea cucumbers and some fish species, in integrated multi-trophic systems.

The major producer of farmed shrimp is China. Other significant producers are Thailand, Indonesia, India, Vietnam, Brazil, Ecuador and Bangladesh. Most farmed shrimp is exported to the United States, the European Union and Japan, also other Asian markets, including South Korea, Hong Kong, Taiwan and Singapore.

Investigations by The Guardian in 2014 and The Associated Press in 2015 found human rights abuses on fishing boats operated by Thailand. The boats are manned with slaves, and catch shrimp and fish (including fish for the production of fishmeal which is fed to farmed prawns). Greenpeace has challenged the sustainability of tropical shrimp farming practices on the grounds that farming these species "has led to the destruction of vast areas of mangroves in several countries [and] over-fishing of juvenile shrimp from the wild to supply farms." Greenpeace has placed a number of the prominent tropical shrimp species that are farmed commercially on its seafood red list, including the whiteleg shrimp, Indian prawn and giant tiger shrimp.

There is also evidence that shrimps, like other crustaceans, can feel pain. Common welfare concerns include water pollution, high population densities, and the spread of diseases. Additionally, many female shrimps have their eyes cut without anesthetic in order to induce maturation of the ovaries.

=== As food ===
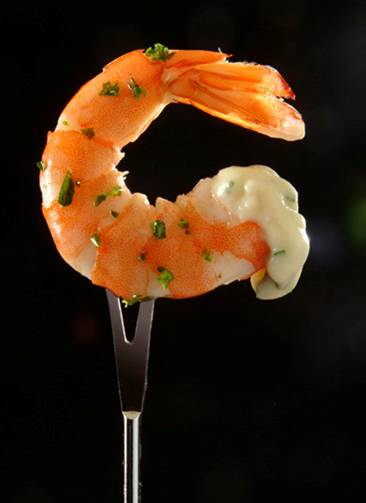
Shrimp tail ready for eating

Shrimp are marketed and commercialized with several issues in mind. Most shrimp are sold frozen and marketed based on their categorization of presentation, grading, colour, and uniformity. Shrimp have high levels of omega-3 fatty acids and low levels of mercury. Usually shrimp is sold whole, though sometimes only the meat of shrimp is marketed.

As with other seafood, shrimp is high in calcium, iodine and protein but low in food energy. A shrimp-based meal is also a significant source of cholesterol, from 122 mg to 251 mg per 100 g of shrimp, depending on the method of preparation. Shrimp consumption, however, is considered healthy for the circulatory system because the lack of significant levels of saturated fat in shrimp means that the high cholesterol content in shrimp improves the ratio of LDL to HDL cholesterol and lowers triglycerides.

Ebiko - shrimp roe, sometimes translated as "shrimp flakes" - is used as one of the ingredients in the preparation of sushi.

Shrimp and other shellfish are among the most common food allergens. They are not kosher and thus are forbidden in Jewish cuisine.

Since the early 2020s, plant-based and cultured alternatives to shrimps have emerged and have been rapidly improving.

=== Aquaria ===
Several types of shrimp are kept in home aquaria. Some are purely ornamental, while others are useful in controlling algae and removing debris. Freshwater shrimp commonly available for aquaria include the Bamboo shrimp, Japanese marsh shrimp (Caridina multidentata, also called "Amano shrimp," as their use in aquaria was pioneered by Takashi Amano), cherry shrimp (Neocaridina heteropoda), and ghost or glass shrimp (Palaemonetes spp.). Popular saltwater shrimp include the cleaner shrimp Lysmata amboinensis, the fire shrimp (Lysmata debelius) and the harlequin shrimp (Hymenocera picta).

Freshwater aquaria variant shrimp come in many colours

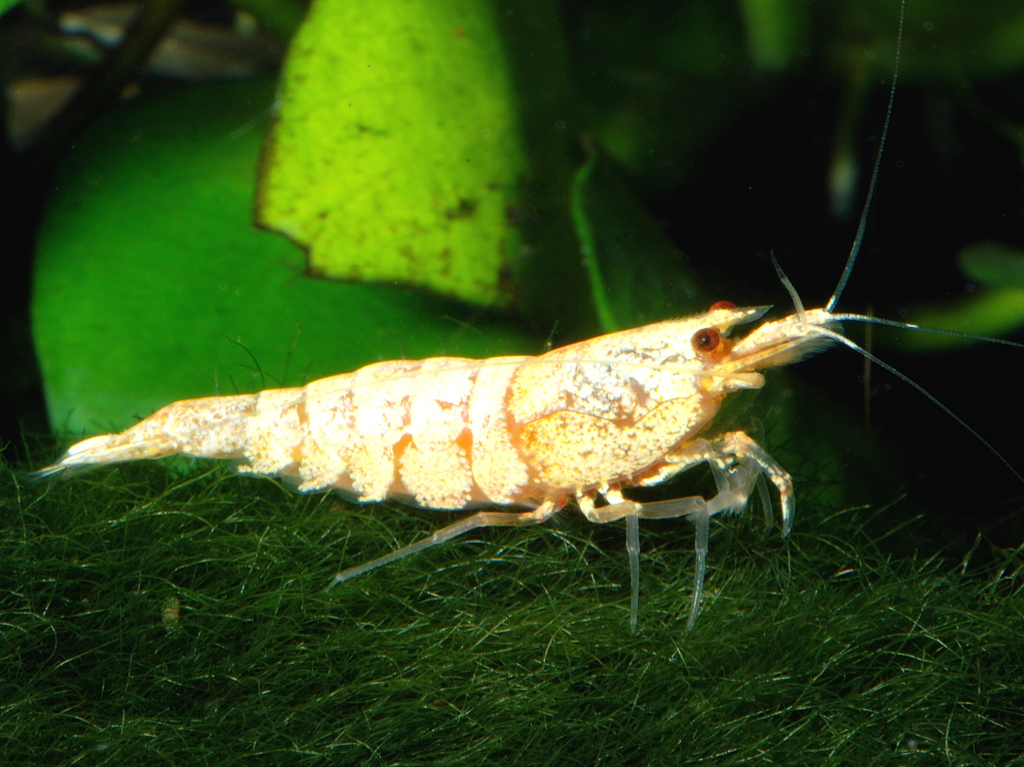
The Caridina cantonensis snow white shrimp is a white freshwater shrimp.

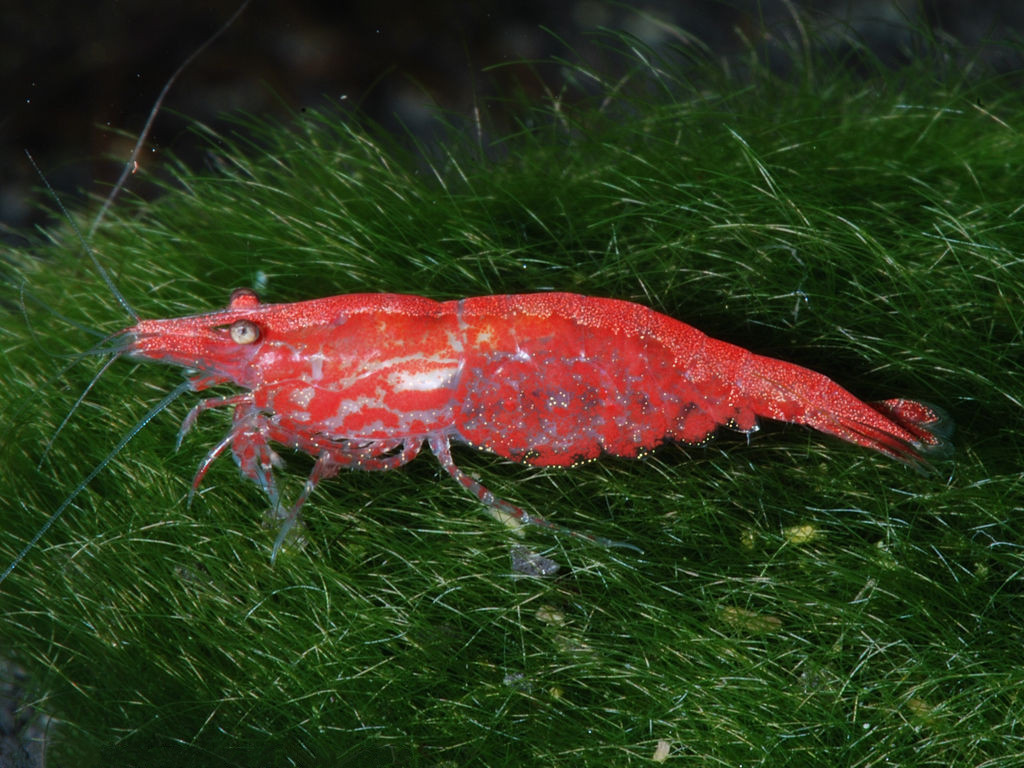
The "Neocaridina heteropoda var. red" cherry shrimp is particularly easy to keep and breed.

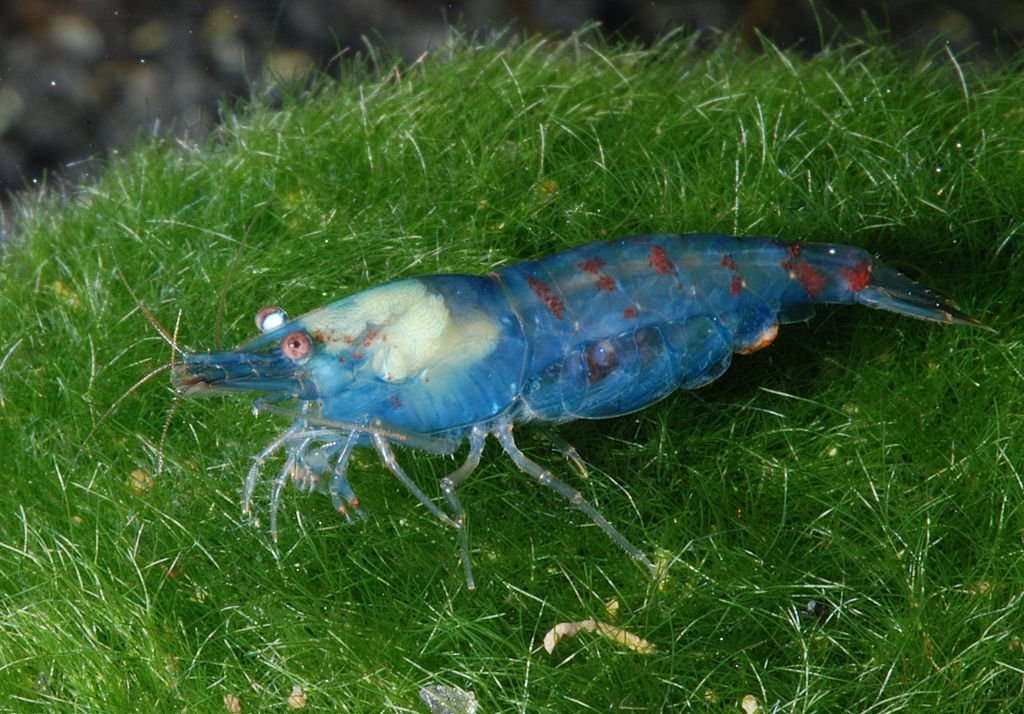
The "Neocaridina zhanghjiajiensis var. blue" pearl shrimp is closely related to the cherry shrimp.

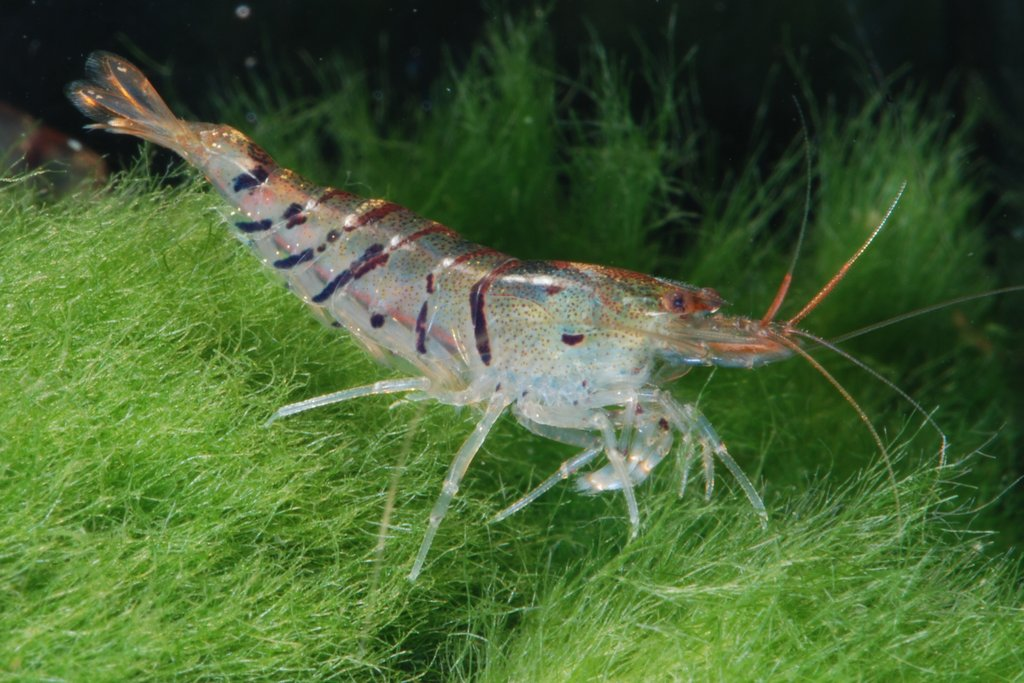
The Caridina cantonensis tiger shrimp is transparent with black stripes.

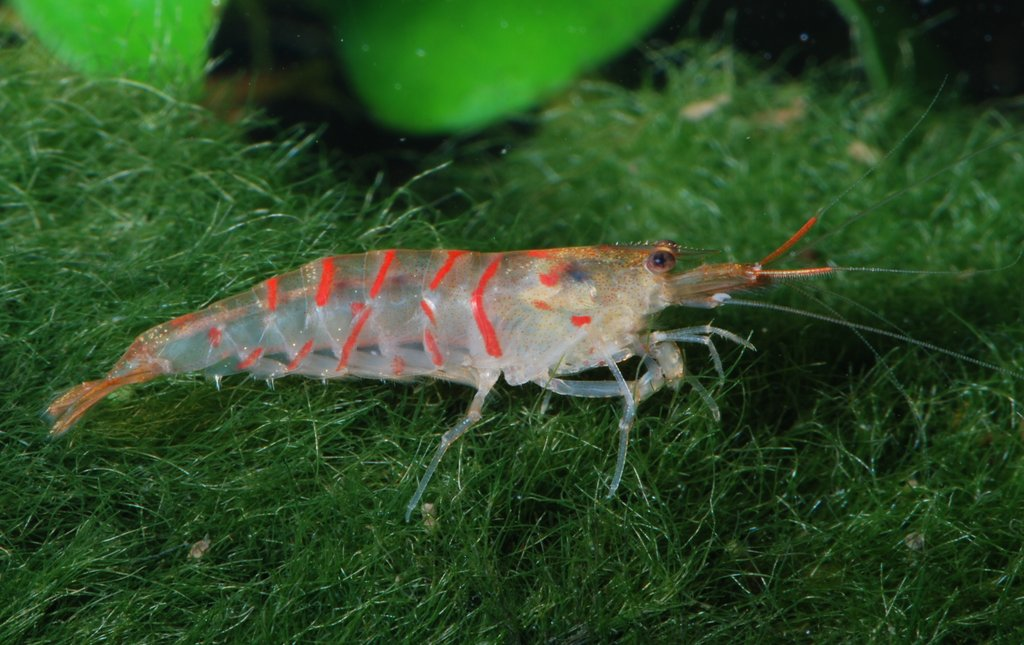
The Caridina cantonensis red tiger shrimp is transparent with red stripes and is found in southern China.

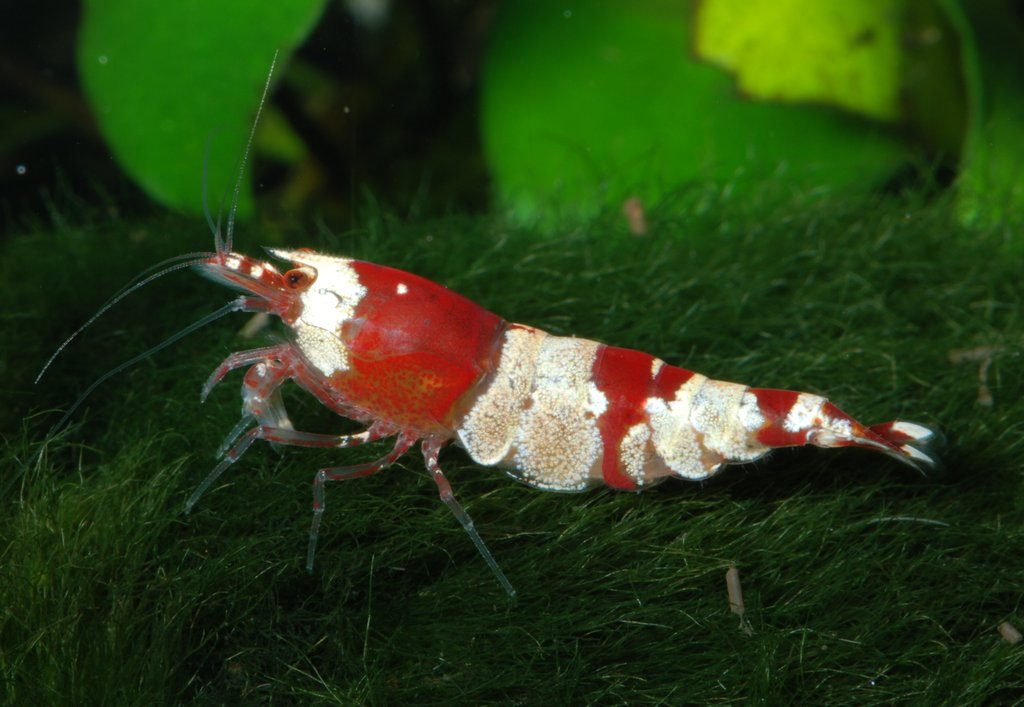
The popular Caridina cantonensis crystal red bee shrimp has broad red and white stripes.

== See also ==
- List of shrimp dishes
- Pain in crustaceans
