= Martin Burkenroad =

American marine biologist

M. D. Burkenroad
- Born: March 20, 1910; New Orleans, Louisiana
- Died: January 12, 1986 (aged 75)
- Scientific career
- Fields: Carcinology, fisheries science

Martin David Burkenroad (March 20, 1910 – January 12, 1986) was an American marine biologist. He specialized in decapod crustaceans and fisheries science.

== Biography ==
Burkenroad was born in New Orleans in 1910 as the only child of coffee importer David Burkenroad and his artist wife Flora Salinger. His family contained many eccentrics, and Martin was similarly labeled "headstrong". He entered Tulane University in 1926, but although he published his first papers during that time, his studies ended when he was "'encouraged' to leave" in 1929. He then began working for the Carnegie Marine Biological Laboratory in the Dry Tortugas, before joining the Louisiana Department of Conservation in 1931, where he studied the local shrimp fishery. After brief spells at several museums, he joined Yale University under the guidance of A. E. Parr. Burkenroad spent many productive years at Yale, where the usual time limit for research for a dissertation was permanently waived for him, but he never submitted a dissertation.

Burkenroad left Yale in 1945 and was married to Marianne Algunde Schweitzer soon after. He became the chief biologist of the North Carolina Survey of Marine Fisheries, but fell out with his superiors, and so moved to Port Aransas to work at the marine facilities of the University of Texas. This was followed by what Burkenroad considered to be his most meaningful position, as a consultant on shrimp fishery to the governments of Panama and Costa Rica. Following a burst dam, however, Burkenroad's attempts to build a shrimp farm were thwarted. In the 1960s, Burkenroad and his family (his wife and three children) returned to New Orleans, where he worked in association with Tulane University. From 1978, he was affiliated with the San Diego Natural History Museum.

== Work ==
Burkenroad's research interests were unusually broad, including astrophysics, Acheulean hand axes, and Lewis Carroll, as well as several fields of biology. In the world of fisheries science, he is best known for his radical views, first presented in 1947, on the history of Pacific halibut stocks. Contrary to the widely held view that conservation measures were responsible for reversing the species' decline, Burkenroad argued that a natural fluctuation was responsible, possibly related to cyclical environmental changes.

Burkenroad was highly critical even of his own work, although it was known for its soundness and reliability. His most famous carcinological paper was titled "The evolution of the Eucarida (Crustacea, Eumalacostraca), in relation to the fossil record", and was published in 1963. This revolutionized the classification of the order Decapoda; instead of a suborder Natantia and a suborder Reptantia, Burkenroad placed the Dendrobranchiata as the sister group to all remaining decapods, in a group he named Pleocyemata. The 1963 paper was intended only as a preliminary analysis, although its sequel would not appear for another 20 years.

Frederick R. Schram concluded his obituary of Burkenroad by stating that "Few individuals have had as great an effect on his science with so relatively few publications as has Martin Burkenroad". Burkenroad is commemorated in the names of several species, including Bentheogennema burkenroadi, "Metapenaeus burkenroadi" (a synonym of Metapenaeus moyebi) and Sicyonia burkenroadi.

== Bibliography ==
According to his obituary, Burkenroad published over 50 scientific papers.

- M. D. Burkenroad (1928). "Observations on the faunas of Lake Ponchartrain and the Mississippi Sound". Beta Mu Journal. 1: 3–4.
- C. Grave & M. D. Burkenroad (1929). "Examination of pelagic organisms". Carnegie Institution of Washington Yearbook. 28: 283–284.
- M. D. Burkenroad (1930). "Sound production in the Haemulidae". Copeia. 1930 (1): 17–18. doi:10.2307/1436165. JSTOR 1436165.
- —— (1930). "Observations on the Louisiana oyster". Biennial Report of the Louisiana Department of Conservation. 9: 78–83.
- —— (1931). "Scientific research on oyster and oyster drill". In J. N. McConnell (ed.). The Louisiana oyster. Baton Rouge, Louisiana: Louisiana Department of Conservation. pp. 23–32.
- —— (1931). "Notes on the sound-producing marine fishes of Louisiana". Copeia. 1931 (1): 20–28. doi:10.2307/1436789. JSTOR 1436789.
- —— (1931). "Sex in the Louisiana oyster, Ostrea virginica". Science. 74 (1907): 71–72. Bibcode:1931Sci....74...71B. doi:10.1126/science.74.1907.71-a. PMID 17739042. S2CID 1240666.
- —— (1931). "A new pentamerous hydromedusa from the Tortugas" (PDF). The Biological Bulletin. 61 (1): 115–119. doi:10.2307/1537049. JSTOR 1537049.
- —— (1931). "Notes on the Louisiana conch, Thais haemastoma Linn., in its relation to the oyster, Ostrea virginica". Ecology. 12 (4): 656–664. doi:10.2307/1929470. JSTOR 1929470.
- —— (1933). "Pteropods from Louisiana". The Nautilus. 47: 54–56.
- —— (1934). "Littoral Penaeidea chiefly from the Bingham Oceanographic Collection, with a revision of Penaeopsis and descriptions of two new genera and eleven new American species". Bulletin of the Bingham Oceanographic Collection. 4 (7): 1–109.
- —— (1934). "The Penaeidea of Louisiana with a discussion of their world relationships". Bulletin of the American Museum of Natural History. 68: 61–143. hdl:2246/492.
- —— (1936). "The Aristaeinae, Solenocerinae and pelagic Penaeinae of the Bingham Oceanographic Collection. Materials for a revision of oceanic Penaeidae". Bulletin of the Bingham Oceanographic Collection. 5 (2): 1–151.
- P. Viosca & M. D. Burkenroad (1936). "The fresh-water medusa in Louisiana". Science. 84 (2172): 155–156. Bibcode:1936Sci....84..155V. doi:10.1126/science.84.2172.155-a. JSTOR 1661277. PMID 17793242. S2CID 35430942.
- M. D. Burkenroad (1936). "A new species of Penaeus from the American Atlantic". Anais da Academia Brasileira de Ciências. 8: 315–318.
- —— (1937). "Some remarks on the structure, habits, and distribution of the benthonic sergestid Sicyonella Borradaile (Crustacea, Decapoda)". Annals and Magazine of Natural History. 10 (9): 505–514. doi:10.1080/00222933708655292.
- —— (1937). "The sex ratio in alternational hermaphrodites, with especial reference to the determination of rate of reversal of sexual phase in oviparous oysters". Journal of Marine Research. 1: 75–85.
- —— (1937). "The Templeton Crocker Expedition. XII. Sergestidae (Crustacea Decapoda) from the Lower Californian region with description of new species and some remarks on the organs of Pesta in Sergestes" (PDF). Zoologica. 22: 315–329.
- —— (1938). "The Templeton Crocker Expedition. XIII. Penaeidae from the region of Lower California and Clarion Island with description of four new species". Zoologica. 23: 55–91.
- —— (1939). "Further observations on Penaeidae of the northern Gulf of Mexico". Bulletin of the Bingham Oceanographic Collection. 6 (6): 1–62.
- —— (1939). "Some remarks upon non-peneid Crustacea Decapoda". Annals and Magazine of Natural History. 11 (3): 310–318. doi:10.1080/03745481.1939.9723606.
- —— (1939). A. E. Parr (ed.). "Pelagic Sargassum vegetation of the North Atlantic". Bulletin of the Bingham Oceanographic Collection. 6 (7): 23–25.
- —— (1940). "Preliminary descriptions of twenty-one new species of pelagic Penaeidea from the Danish Oceanographica Expedition". Annals and Magazine of Natural History. 11 (6): 35–54. doi:10.1080/03745481.1940.9723655.
- —— (1942). "The development and relationships of Glyphocrangon (Crustacea Decapoda Caridea)". The American Naturalist. 76 (765): 421–425. doi:10.1086/281064. JSTOR 2457593. S2CID 84827926.
- —— (1943). "A possible function of bioluminescence". Journal of Marine Research. 5: 161–164.
- —— (1945). "A new sergestid shrimp (Peisos petrunkevitschi, n. gen., n. sp.), with remarks on its relationships". Transactions of the Connecticut Academy of Arts and Sciences. 36: 553–593.
- —— (1946). "Status of the name Sicyonia, with a note on S. typica and description of two new species". Arkiv för Zoologi. 37A (9): 1–10.
- —— (1946). "Fluctuations in abundance of marine animals". Science. 103 (2684): 684–686. Bibcode:1946Sci...103..684B. doi:10.1126/science.103.2684.684. JSTOR 1671818. PMID 17750515.
- —— (1946). "General discussion of problems involved in starfish utilization". Bulletin of the Bingham Oceanographic Collection. 9 (3): 3–6.
- —— (1946). "The development of marine resources in Indonesia". The Far Eastern Quarterly. 1946 (2): 89–99. doi:10.2307/2049744. JSTOR 2049744. S2CID 166156662.
- —— (1947). "Reproductive activities of decapod Crustacea". The American Naturalist. 81 (800): 392–398. doi:10.1086/281551. JSTOR 2458249. PMID 20267536. S2CID 28948097.
- —— (1947). "Production of sound in the fiddler crab Uca pugilator Bosc, with remarks on its nocturnal and mating behavior". Ecology. 28 (4): 458–462. doi:10.2307/1931234. JSTOR 1931234.
- —— (1947). "Egg number is a matter of interest in fishery biology". Science. 106 (2752): 289–290. Bibcode:1947Sci...106..289.. doi:10.1126/science.106.2752.289. PMID 17840738.
- —— (1948). "Fluctuations in abundance of Pacific halibut". Bulletin of the Bingham Oceanography Collection. 11 (4): 81–129.
- —— (1949). "Occurrence and life histories of commercial shrimp". Science. 110 (2869): 688–689. Bibcode:1949Sci...110..688B. doi:10.1126/science.110.2869.688. JSTOR 1677054. PMID 15407880.
- —— (1950). "Book review: Population dynamics in a regulated marine fishery". Texas Journal of Science. 2: 438–441.
- —— (1950). "Measurement of the natural growth rates of decapod crustaceans". Proceedings of the Gulf and Caribbean Fisheries Institute. 3: 25–26.
- —— (1951). "Some principles of marine fishery biology". Publications of the Institute of Marine Science. 2 (1): 177–212.
- —— & Curtis L. Newcombe (1952). "Applications of ecology and economics to fisheries". Science. 115 (2983): 251–252. Bibcode:1952Sci...115..251B. doi:10.1126/science.115.2983.251-a. JSTOR 1678496. PMID 17799799.
- —— (1953). "Theory and practice of marine fishery management". Journal du Conseil. 18 (3): 300–310. doi:10.1093/icesjms/18.3.300.
- J. W. Hedgpeth; R. J. Menzies; C. H. Hand & M. D. Burkenroad (1953). "On certain problems of taxonomists". Science. 117 (3027): 17–18. Bibcode:1953Sci...117...17H. doi:10.1126/science.117.3027.17-a. JSTOR 1681071. PMID 17753339.
- ——; J. L. Obarrio & C. A. Mendoza (1955). "La pesca del camarón en Panama". Revista de Agricultura, Comercio e Industria, Panama. 13 (21): 4–10.
- —— (1957). "Intensity of setting of starfish in Long Island Sound in relation to fluctuations of the stock of adult starfish and in the setting of oysters". Ecology. 38 (1): 164–165. doi:10.2307/1932152. JSTOR 1932152.
- —— (1959). "Decapoda Macrura I. Penaeidae". Résultats Scientifiques Mission Robert Ph. Dollfus en Égypte, Part 3. 25: 67–92.
- —— (1959). "Addenda et corrigenda au Mémoire XXV. Penaeidae". Résultats Scientifiques Mission Robert Ph. Dollfus en Égypte, Part 3: 285.
- —— (1963). "The evolution of the Eucarida (Crustacea Eumalacostraca) in relation to the fossil record" (PDF). Tulane Studies in Geology. 2 (1): 1–16.
- —— (1963). "Comments on the petition concerning peneid names (Crustacea Decapoda) (Z.N.(S) 962)". Bulletin of Zoological Nomenclature. 20 (3): 169–174. doi:10.5962/bhl.part.6601.
- H. Alfvén; W.-H. Ip & M. D. Burkenroad (1974). "Cosmogony of the asteroid belt". Nature. 250 (5468): 634–636. Bibcode:1974Natur.250..634A. doi:10.1038/250634a0. S2CID 4158104.
- M. D. Burkenroad (1981). "The higher taxonomy and evolution of Decapoda". Transactions of the San Diego Society of Natural History. 19 (17): 251–268.
- —— (1983). "Natural classification of Dendrobranchiata, with a key to the recent genera". In F. R. Schram (ed.). Crustacean Phylogeny. Crustacean Issues. Vol. 1. A. A. Balkema. pp. 279–290. ISBN 978-90-6191-231-6.
- —— (1984). "A note on branchial formulae of Decapoda". Journal of Crustacean Biology. 4 (2): 277. doi:10.2307/1548025. JSTOR 1548025.
- —— (1985). "W. T. Calman (1871–1952), photograph and commemorative anecdote". Journal of Crustacean Biology. 5 (2): 362–363. JSTOR 1547887.
- —— & F. R. Schram (1986). "Heinrich Balss (1866–1957)". Journal of Crustacean Biology. 6 (2): 300–301. doi:10.1163/193724086x00136. JSTOR 1547991.
