= Natantia =

Historic group of crustaceans

Natantia (Boas, 1880) is an obsolete taxon of decapod crustaceans, comprising those families that move predominantly by swimming – the shrimp (comprising Caridea and Procarididea), prawns (Dendrobranchiata) and boxer shrimp. The remaining Decapoda were placed in the Reptantia, and consisted of crabs, lobsters and other large animals that move chiefly by walking along the bottom. The division between Natantia and Reptantia was replaced in 1963, when Martin Burkenroad erected the suborder Pleocyemata for those animals that brood their eggs on the pleopods, leaving Dendrobranchiata for the prawns. Under this system, Natantia is a paraphyletic group. Burkenroad's primary division of Decapoda into Dendrobranchiata and Pleocyemata has since been corroborated by molecular analyses.

Representatives of three of the groups formerly placed in "Natantia"

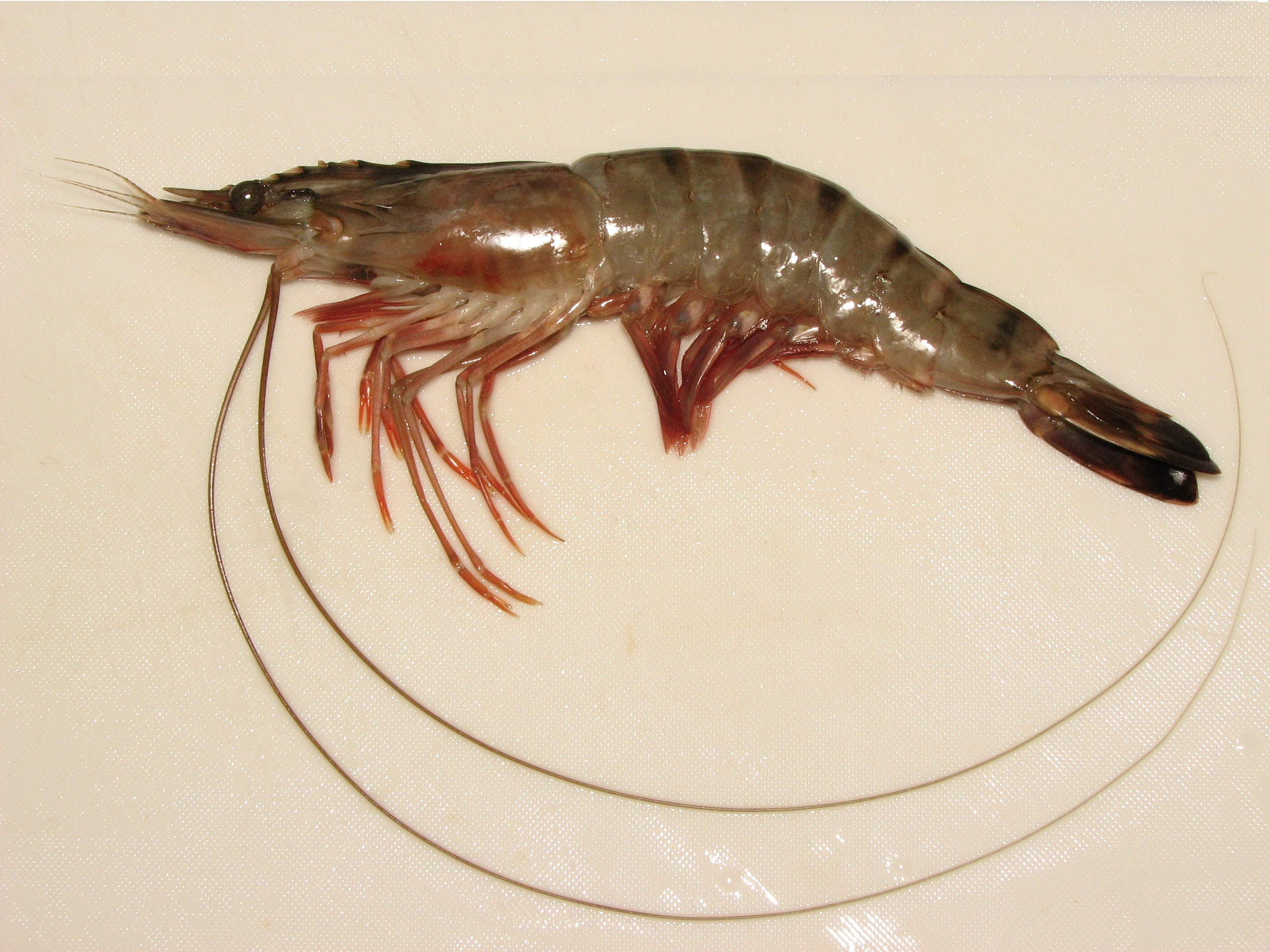
Dendrobranchiata: Penaeus monodon

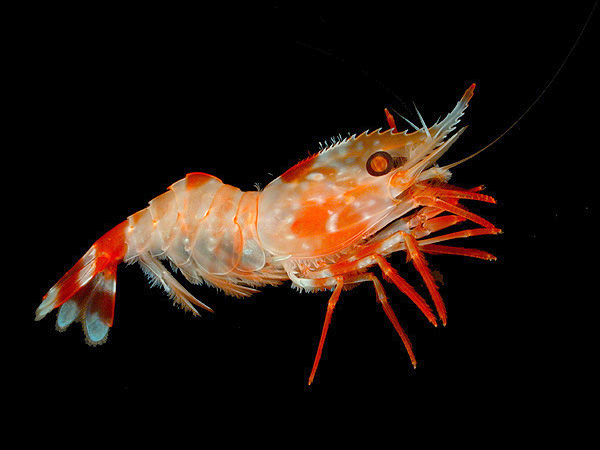
Caridea: Heterocarpus ensifer

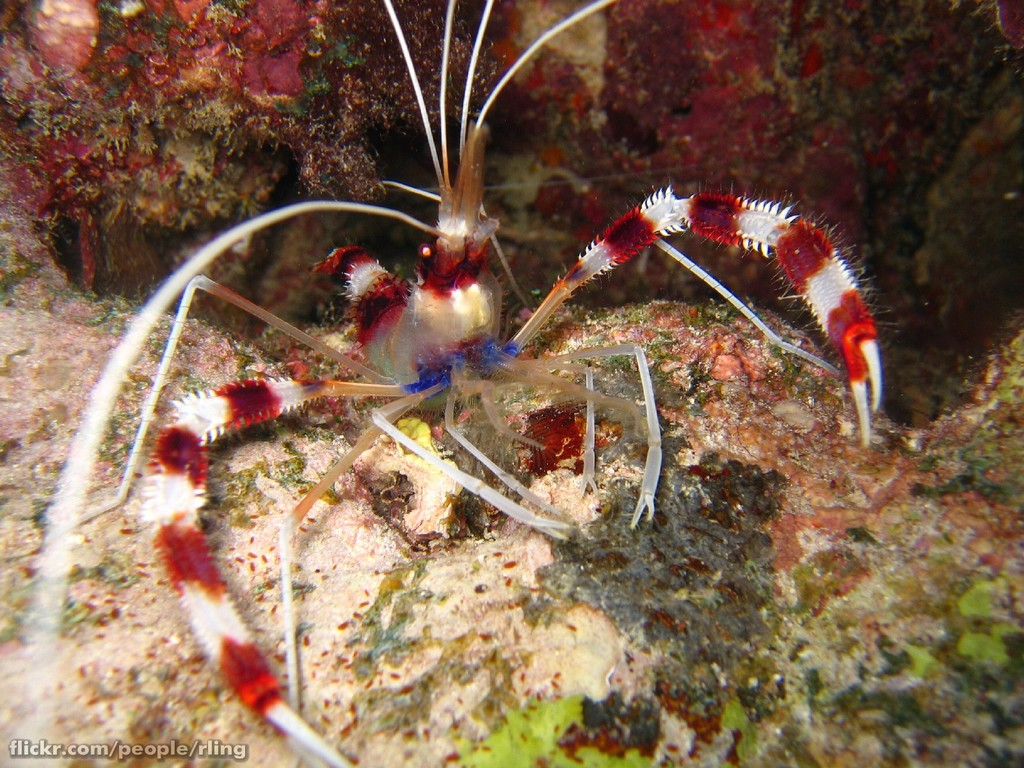
Stenopodidea: Stenopus hispidus

The name Natantia Owen, 1851 was utilized in a phylogenetic context by Madzia and Cau (2017) as the most exclusive mosasaurid clade including Mosasaurus and Tylosaurus but not Halisaurus.
