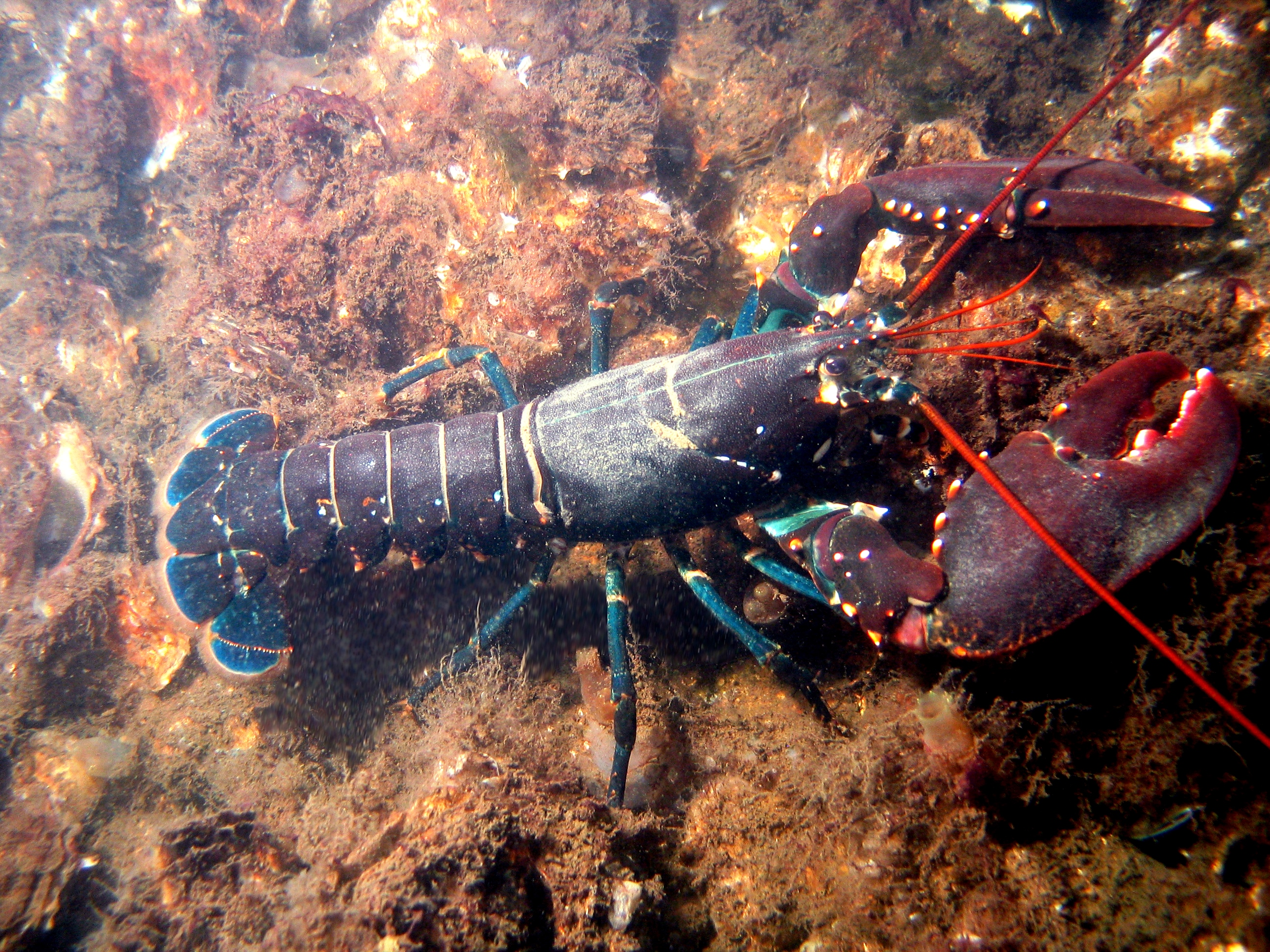
- European lobster (Homarus gammarus)

Scientific classification
- Kingdom: Animalia
- Phylum: Arthropoda
- Class: Malacostraca
- Order: Decapoda
- Suborder: Pleocyemata
- Clade: Reptantia; Boas, 1880

Infraorders
- Achelata; Polychelida; Glypheidea; Astacidea; Axiidea; Gebiidea; Anomura; Brachyura

= Reptantia =

Reptantia Temporal range: Devonian–recent

Suborder of crustaceans

Reptantia is a clade of decapod crustaceans named in 1880 which includes lobsters, crabs and many other well-known crustaceans.

== Classification ==
In older classifications, Reptantia was one of the two suborders of Decapoda alongside Natantia, with Reptantia containing the walking forms, and Natantia containing the swimming forms (prawns, shrimp and boxer shrimp). However, in 1963 Martin Burkenroad found Natantia to be paraphyletic and invalid, and instead split Decapoda into the two suborders of Dendrobranchiata (prawns) and Pleocyemata. Pleocyemata contains all the members of the Reptantia (including crabs, lobsters, crayfish, and others), as well as the Stenopodidea ("boxer shrimp"), and Caridea (true shrimp). Reptantia remains a valid monophyletic grouping, but is now no longer ranked as a suborder.

== Anatomy ==
The name Reptantia means "those that walk", and contains those decapods whose primary mode of locomotion is to walk along a surface using the pereiopods rather than swimming through the water with the pleopods. Despite this, many reptants are able to propel themselves through the water, and many non-reptants can and will walk.

== Systematics ==
The cladogram below shows Reptantia under the sub-order Pleocyemata within the larger order Decapoda, from analysis by Wolfe et al., 2019.

- Decapoda
  - - Dendrobranchiata (prawns)
  - Pleocyemata
    - - Stenopodidea (boxer shrimp)
      - - Procarididea
        - Caridea ("true" shrimp)
    - Reptantia (crawling / walking decapods)
      - - Achelata (spiny lobsters and slipper lobsters)
        - - Polychelida (benthic crustaceans)
          - Astacidea (lobsters and crayfish)
      - - Axiidea (mud shrimp, ghost shrimp, and burrowing shrimp)
        - - Gebiidea (mud lobsters and mud shrimp)
          - - Anomura (hermit crabs and allies)
            - Brachyura ("true" crabs)

Reptantia comprises the following infraorders:

- Achelata (spiny, slipper, and furry lobsters)
- Polychelida (benthic crustaceans)
- Glypheidea (glypheoid lobsters)
- Astacidea (true lobsters, reef lobsters, and crayfish)
- Axiidea (mud lobsters and ghost shrimp)
- Gebiidea (mud lobsters and mud shrimp)
- Anomura (squat lobsters, hermit crabs, and relatives)
- Brachyura (true crabs)
