= Journal of Crustacean Biology =

- Discipline: Carcinology
- Language: English
- Edited by: Peter Castro

Publication details
- History: 1981–present
- Publisher: The Crustacean Society (United States)
- Frequency: Quarterly
- Impact factor: 1.064 (2013)

Standard abbreviations
- ISO 4: J. Crustac. Biol.

Indexing
- ISSN: 0278-0372 (print); 1937-240X (web)
- OCLC no.: 48683499

Links
- Journal homepage; Online access

The Journal of Crustacean Biology is a quarterly peer-reviewed scientific journal in the field of carcinology (crustacean research). It is published by The Crustacean Society and Oxford University Press (formerly by Brill Publishers and Allen Press), and since 2015 the editor-in-chief has been Peter Castro. According to the Journal Citation Reports, its 2016 impact factor is 1.064.

The journal has a mandatory publication fee of US$ 115 per printed page for non-members of the Society and an optional open access fee of $1830 minimum.
