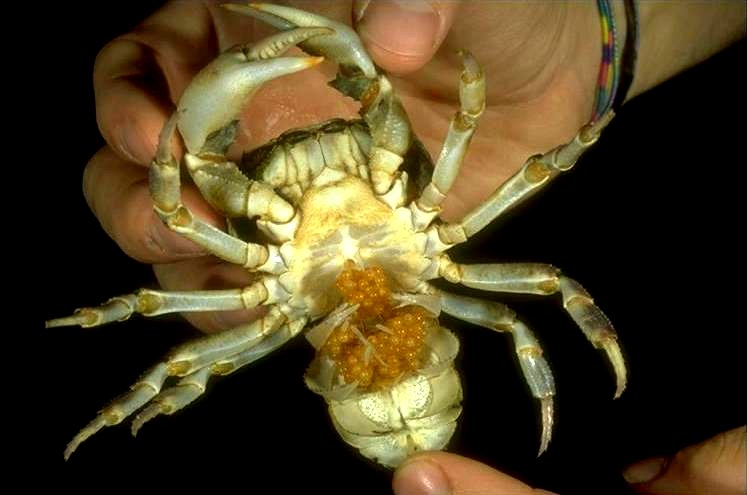
- Ovigerous female Potamon fluviatile with the pleon held open to show the eggs held on the pleopods

Scientific classification
- Kingdom: Animalia
- Phylum: Arthropoda
- Class: Malacostraca
- Superorder: Eucarida
- Order: Decapoda
- Suborder: Pleocyemata; Burkenroad, 1963

Infraorders
- Stenopodidea; Caridea; Procarididea; Reptantia; Achelata; Polychelida; Glypheidea; Astacidea; Axiidea; Gebiidea; Anomura; Brachyura

= Pleocyemata =

Pleocyemata Temporal range: Devonian–recent

Suborder of crustaceans

Pleocyemata is a suborder of decapod crustaceans, erected by Martin Burkenroad in 1963. Burkenroad's classification replaced the earlier sub-orders of Natantia and Reptantia with the monophyletic groups Dendrobranchiata (prawns) and Pleocyemata. Pleocyemata contains all the members of the Reptantia (including crabs, lobsters, crayfish, and others), as well as the Stenopodidea (which contains the so-called "boxer shrimp" or "barber-pole shrimp"), and Caridea, which contains the true shrimp.

== Anatomy ==
All members of the Pleocyemata are united by a number of features, the most important of which is that the fertilised eggs are incubated by the female, and remain stuck to the pleopods (swimming legs) until the zoea larvae are ready to hatch. It is this characteristic that gives the group its name. Pleocyemata also possess a lamellar gill structure as opposed to the branches found in the Dendrobranchiata.

== Systematics ==
The cladogram below shows Pleocyemata as the sister clade to Dendrobranchiata within the larger order Decapoda, from analysis by Wolfe et al., 2019.

- Decapoda
  - - Dendrobranchiata (prawns)
  - Pleocyemata
    - - Stenopodidea (boxer shrimp)
      - - Procarididea
        - Caridea ("true" shrimp)
    - Reptantia (crawling / walking decapods)
      - - Achelata (spiny lobsters and slipper lobsters)
        - - Polychelida (benthic crustaceans)
          - Astacidea (lobsters and crayfish)
      - - Axiidea (mud shrimp, ghost shrimp, and burrowing shrimp)
        - - Gebiidea (mud lobsters and mud shrimp)
          - - Anomura (hermit crabs and allies)
            - Brachyura ("true" crabs)

Pleocyemata comprises the following infraorders:

- Stenopodidea (stenopodidean shrimp)
- Caridea (caridean shrimp)
- Procarididea
- Achelata (spiny, slipper, and furry lobsters)
- Polychelida (benthic crustaceans)
- Glypheidea (glypheoid lobsters)
- Astacidea (true lobsters, reef lobsters, and crayfish)
- Axiidea (mud lobsters and ghost shrimp)
- Gebiidea (mud lobsters and mud shrimp)
- Anomura (squat lobsters, hermit crabs, and relatives)
- Brachyura (true crabs)

The earliest fossil representative is the Devonian Palaeopalaemon.
