= Peter Castro =

Peter Castro is the Deputy Managing Editor of People magazine, a job held since late 2007. He was named managing editor of People en Español in August 2006.

Prior to joining People en Español, Castro spent 18 years at People magazine, most recently serving as executive editor overseeing television and pop music coverage. He first joined People magazine as a writer for the Chatter column in 1987. Three years later, he moved to Australia as a founding staffer on People magazine's Australian offshoot. In 2001 he was named assistant managing editor. In September 2004, he edited the first Emmy editions of People magazine's Hollywood Daily. Prior to joining People magazine, Castro was a staff writer for Vanity Fair magazine.

He has provided pop culture commentary on a variety of TV programs including Entertainment Tonight, Access Hollywood, Extra (TV series), CNN’s Larry King Live, Good Morning America, Dateline NBC, Today Show and E!’s Red Carpet pre-show among others.
