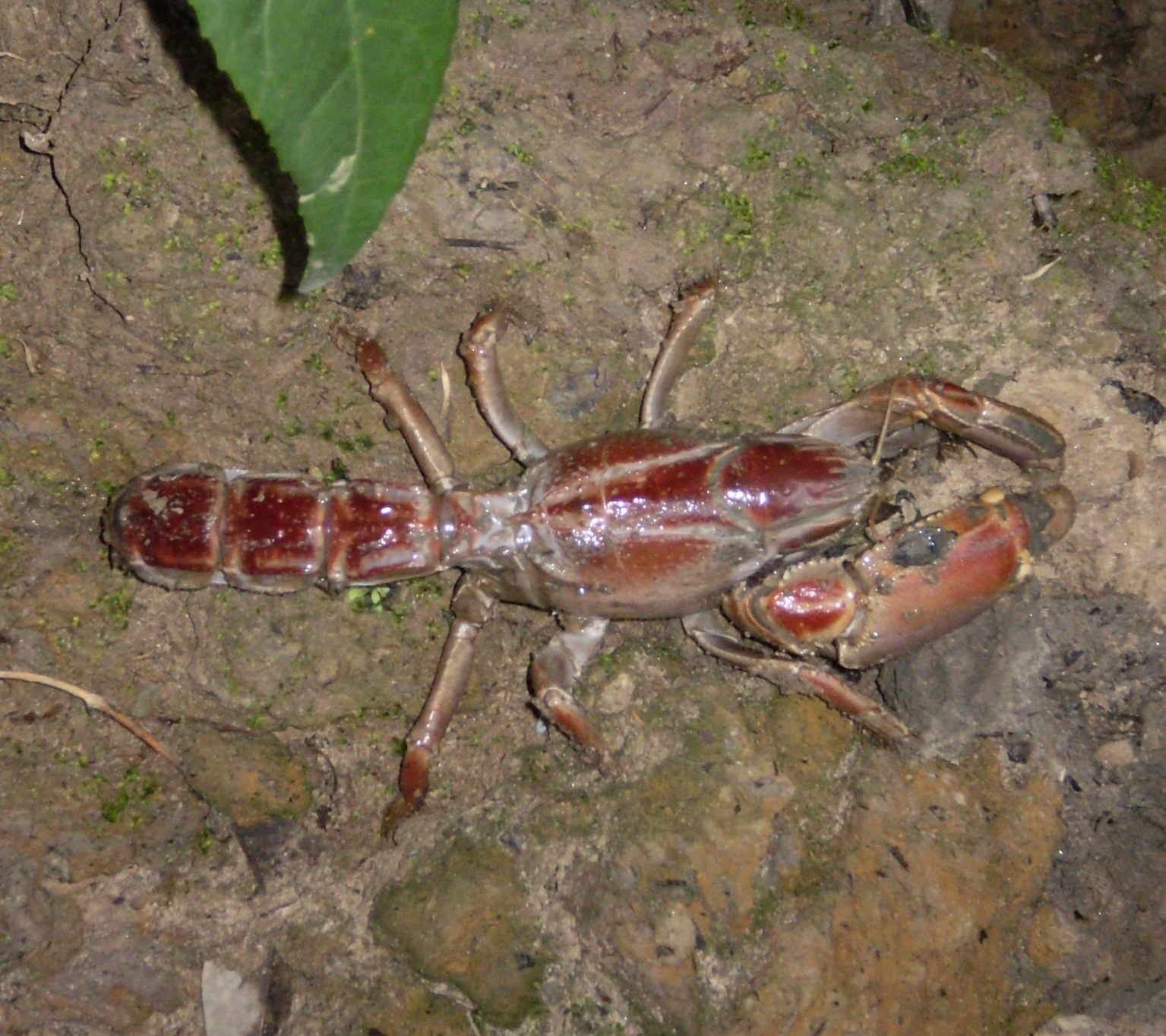
- Thalassina anomala

Scientific classification
- Kingdom: Animalia
- Phylum: Arthropoda
- Clade: Pancrustacea
- Class: Malacostraca
- Order: Decapoda
- Suborder: Pleocyemata
- Clade: Reptantia
- Infraorder: Gebiidea
- Family: Thalassinidae; Latreille, 1831
- Genus: Thalassina; Latreille, 1806

Type species
- Thalassina scorpionides Latreille, 1806

Species
- 11 extant, 1 fossil species (see text)

= Thalassina =

Thalassina Temporal range: Miocene–Recent

Genus of lobsters

Thalassina is a genus of mud lobsters found in the mangrove swamps of the Indian Ocean and western Pacific Ocean. Its nocturnal burrowing is important for the recycling of nutrients in the mangrove ecosystem, although it is sometimes considered a pest of fish and prawn farms.

== Description ==
Thalassina is a lobster-like animal which grows up to 30 centimetres (12 in) long, but is more typically 6–20 cm (2.4–7.9 in) long. Its colour ranges from pale to dark brown and brownish green. The carapace is tall and ovoid, extends over less than one third of the animal's length, and projects forward into a short rostrum. The tail is long and thin, and, like many burrowing decapods, the uropods are reduced in form, and do not form a functional tail fan with the telson. Various rows of setae on the legs and gills are used to prevent sediment from reaching the gills and for expelling any which does reach them. Thalassina also makes use of "respiratory reversal" to keep the gills free of dirt.

== Distribution ==
Thalassina is found along the coast of the Asian mainland from Kerala, India to Vietnam, including Sri Lanka and the Andaman and Nicobar Islands. It is also found throughout most of Maritime Southeast Asia and the Ryukyu Islands, and its range extends south to most of Australia's north coast (from the North West Cape in Western Australia to Central Queensland), and east to Fiji and Samoa.

== Ecology and behaviour ==
Thalassina lives in burrows up to 2 m (6.6 ft) deep, and is active at night. Its burrowing fulfils an important rôle in the mangrove ecosystem bringing organic matter up from deep sediments. The animal's output forms large volcano-like mounds which can reach heights of 3 m (10 ft) and are vital to many other species such as Odontomachus malignus (an ant), Episesarma singaporense (a crab), Wolffogebia phuketensis (another mud shrimp), Idioctis littoralis (a spider), Acrochordus granulatus (a snake), Excoecaria agallocha (a mangrove) and termites. The burrowing activity can cause T. anomala to be seen as a pest where it weakened the bunding that surrounds prawn farms or fish farms. The small-eyed goby, a species of herbivorous goby specialising in feeding on seagrass, shares the burrows of mud lobsters of the genus Thalassina.

== Use as food ==
In parts of its range, including Malaysia, Indonesia, Philippines, New Guinea and Fiji, the claws of Thalassina are eaten, but the meat is bland and it is never very popular. In powdered form or steeped in alcohol, it is used in Thailand as a remedy for asthma.

== Fossil record ==
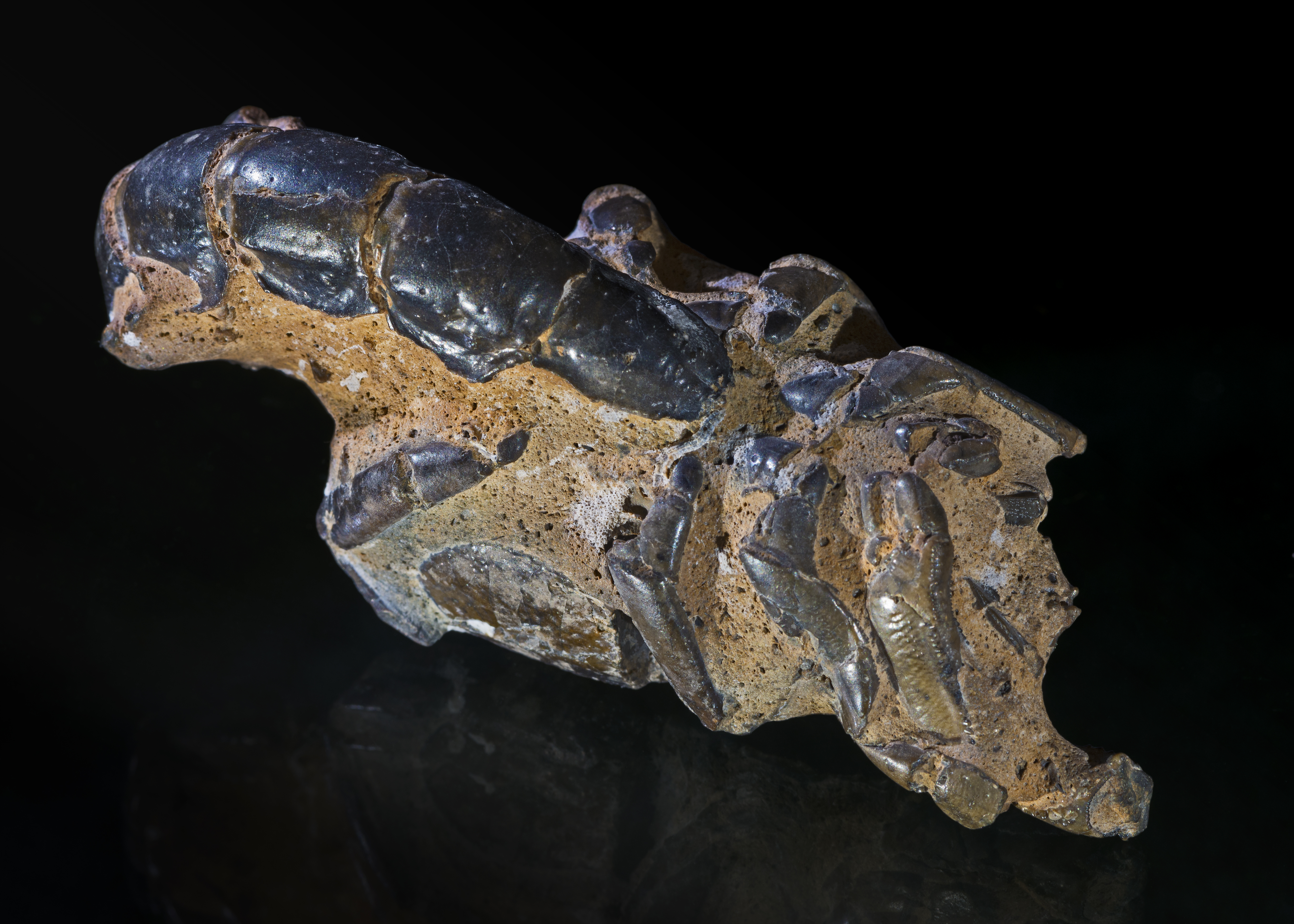
Thalassina anomala - Fossil

Fossils of Thalassina are encountered "in countless numbers", and extend back as far as the Miocene. They are generally preserved in a hard phosphatic nodule which is believed to be the animal's moulting position. Storms may trap the animals in their burrows, and the mineral-rich nature of the sediments leads to very rapid fossilisation. The presence of Thalassina, together with other warm-water species in the Miocene of Japan (outside the current range of the species) is taken as confirmation of a period of increased temperatures 16 million years ago.

== Taxonomy ==
Thalassina is the only genus in the family Thalassinidae (=Scorpionoidae Haworth, 1825). For many years, only a single species, Thalassina anomala, was recognised, but a 2009 revision by Nguyen Ngoc-Ho and Michèle de Saint Laurent increased the number of extant species to eight, including one fossil species. Thalassinidae is classified in the infraorder Gebiidea, alongside the families Upogebiidae, Axianassidae and Laomediidae.

== Species ==
The extant species are:

- Thalassina anomala Herbst, 1804 – Indo-West Pacific, synonym T. maxima
- Thalassina australiensis Sakai & Türkay, 2012
- Thalassina emerii Bell, 1844
- Thalassina gracilis Dana, 1852 – Thailand, Singapore, Indonesia and north-western Australia
- Thalassina kelanang Moh & Chong, 2009 – Malaysia
- Thalassina krempfi Ngoc-Ho & de Saint Laurent, 2009 – Vietnam, Singapore and Indonesia
- Thalassina pratas Lin, Komani & Chan, 2016 – China
- Thalassina saetichelis Sakai & Türkay, 2012
- Thalassina spinirostris Ngoc-Ho & de Saint Laurent, 2009 – Singapore, Malaysia
- Thalassina spinosa Ngoc-Ho & de Saint Laurent, 2009 – Indonesia, India and Papua New Guinea
- Thalassina squamifera de Man, 1915 – Thailand, Philippines, Singapore, Indonesia, Papua New Guinea, Solomon Islands, Fiji, northern Australia

The fossil species, Thalassina emerii, is known from northern Australia, Papua New Guinea and Indonesia.
