= Upogebia capensis =

Scientific classification
- Kingdom: Animalia
- Phylum: Arthropoda
- Clade: Pancrustacea
- Class: Malacostraca
- Order: Decapoda
- Suborder: Pleocyemata
- Family: Upogebiidae
- Genus: Upogebia
- Species: U. capensis

Binomial name
- Upogebia capensis (Krauss, 1843)

Species of crustacean

Upogebia capensis, or Cape mud shrimp, is a mud shrimp of the family Upogebiidae. It is endemic to the Atlantic and Indian Ocean coasts of southern Africa and occurs from Namibia (Luderitz) to Mozambique.

Upogebia capensis lives in a permanent burrow under stones on the open coast, but never in estuaries. It is similar to Upogebia africana, but the walking legs of capensis do not have spines at their bases.
