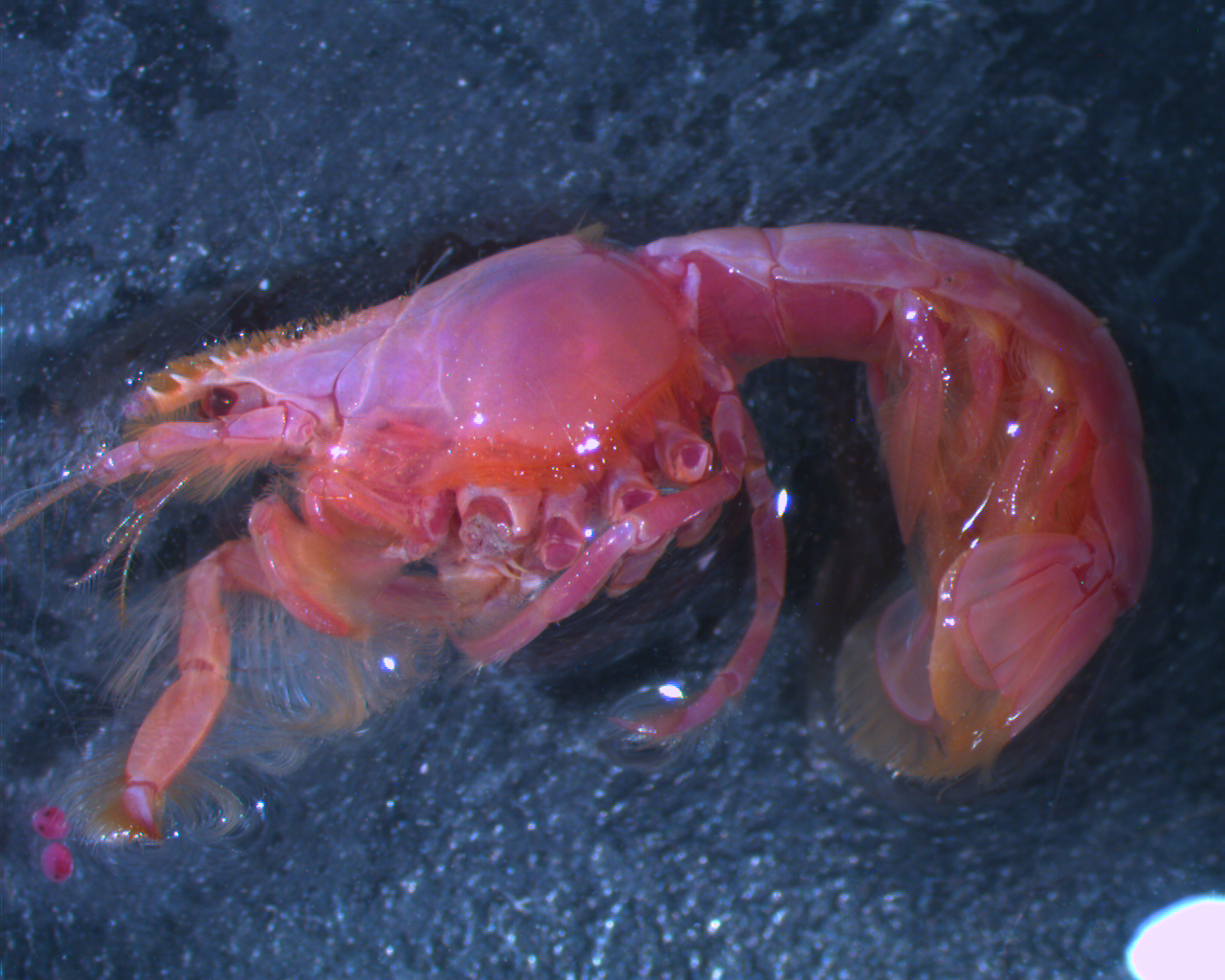

Scientific classification
- Domain: Eukaryota
- Kingdom: Animalia
- Phylum: Arthropoda
- Class: Malacostraca
- Order: Decapoda
- Suborder: Pleocyemata
- Family: Upogebiidae
- Genus: Upogebia
- Species: U. pusilla

Binomial name
- Upogebia pusilla (Petagna, 1792)

= Upogebia pusilla =

Species of shrimp

Upogebia pusilla is a species of mud shrimp in the genus Upogebia and the infraorder Gebiidea. It lives in Europe, especially around the Mediterranean Sea. Its shed is often found ashore or in shallow underwater areas. It was described in 1792 by Vincenzo Petagna.

It lives on areas up to 45 m (148 ft) deep and can sometimes be found in estuarine areas.
