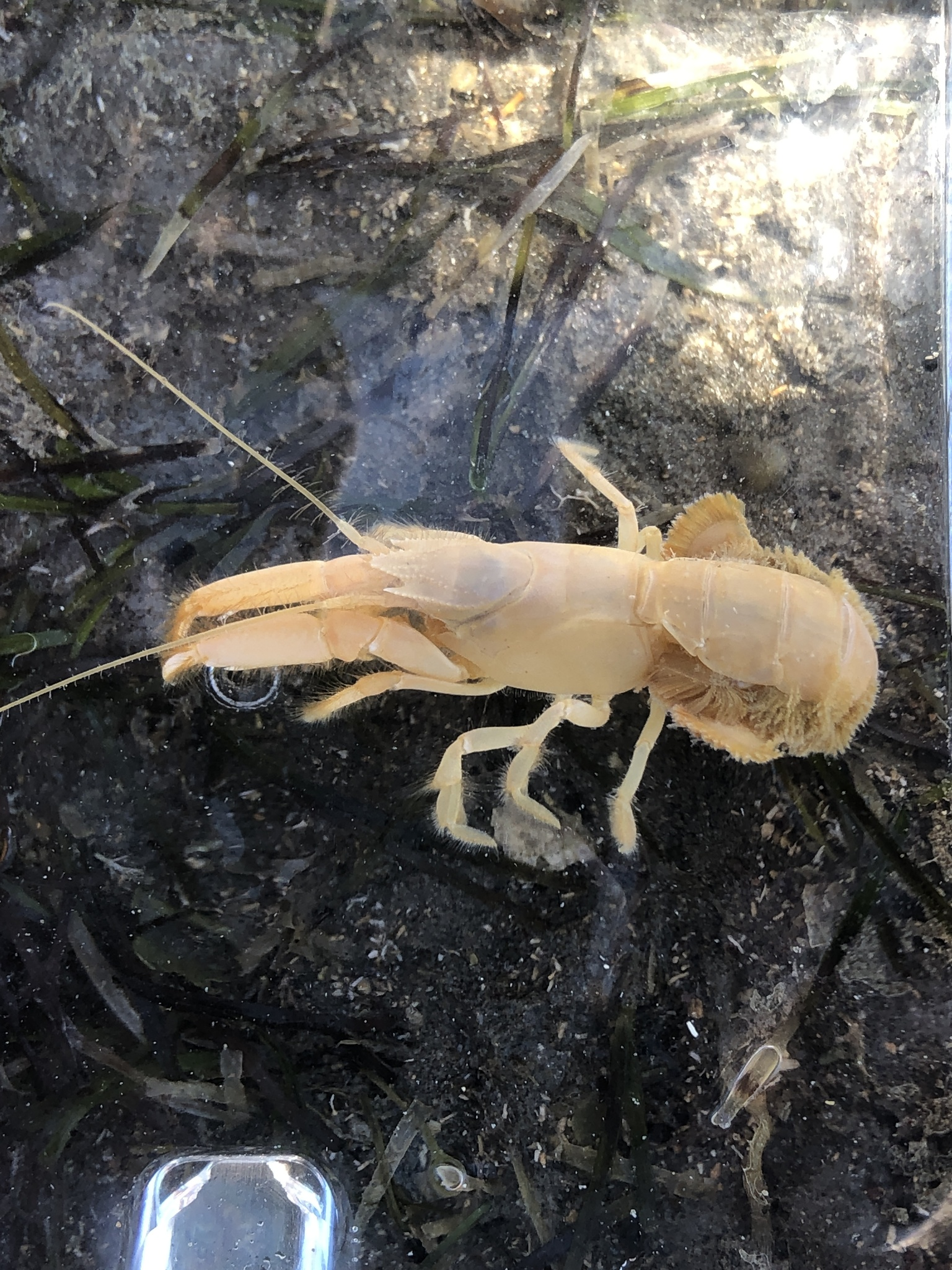

Scientific classification
- Kingdom: Animalia
- Phylum: Arthropoda
- Clade: Pancrustacea
- Class: Malacostraca
- Order: Decapoda
- Suborder: Pleocyemata
- Family: Upogebiidae
- Genus: Acutigebia
- Species: A. danai

Binomial name
- Acutigebia danai (Miers, 1876)

Synonyms
- Gebia danai Miers, 1876; Upogebia danai (Miers, 1876)

= Acutigebia danai =

Species of crustacean

Acutigebia danai is a mud shrimp of the family Upogebiidae, endemic to the coastal waters of New Zealand and the Kermadec Islands.

== Distribution ==
It has been recorded from the Bay of Islands, Stewart Island, the Kaikōura Peninsula, Cook Strait, Hauraki Gulf, Opoulu, Kaipara Harbour, the Kermadec Islands.

== Taxonomy ==
Adam White described Upogebia hirtifrons in 1847 based on specimens collected during an Antarctic expedition. Later, James Dwight Dana examined material from Bay of Islands, New Zealand, and incorrectly assigned them to White's species. However, Edward J. Miers recognized that the two were distinct species and described the New Zealand species as Gebia danai, honoring Dana in the specific epithet. It is now known that both species occur in New Zealand.
