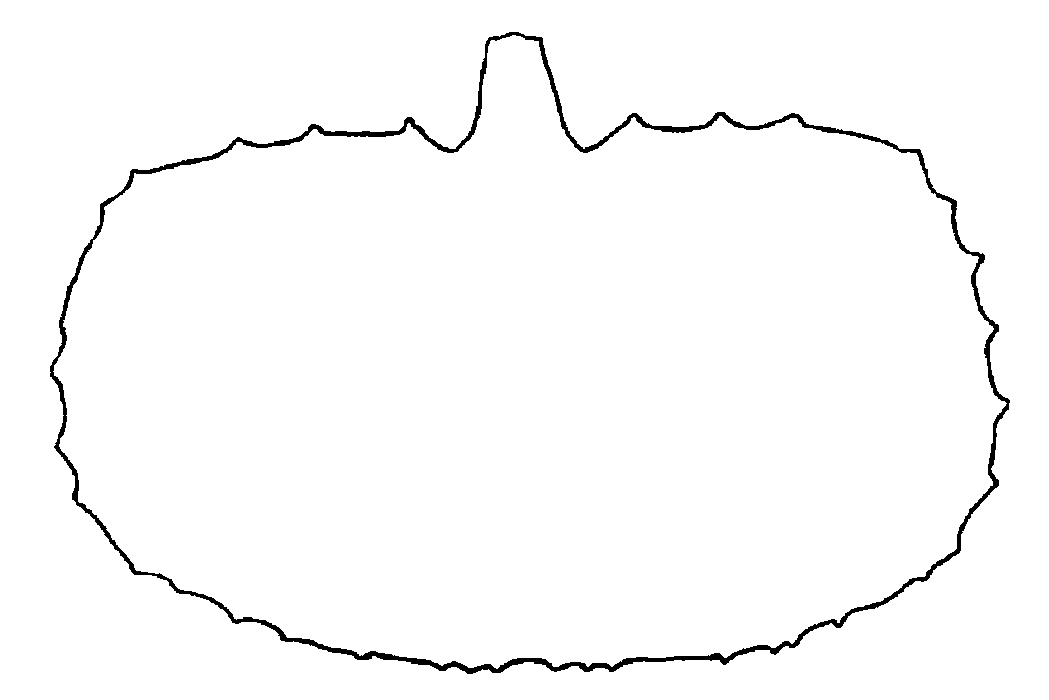
- Outline of C. expansus by Rathbun

Scientific classification
- Kingdom: Animalia
- Phylum: Arthropoda
- Class: Malacostraca
- Order: Decapoda
- Suborder: Pleocyemata
- Infraorder: Anomura
- Family: Lithodidae
- Genus: Cryptolithodes
- Species: C. expansus

Binomial name
- Cryptolithodes expansus Miers, 1879

= Cryptolithodes expansus =

Species of king crab

Cryptolithodes expansus (Japanese: メンコガニ) is a species of king crab native to the Korean coast and Japan. They live in the sublittoral zone to a depth of approximately 5–66 metres (16–217 ft). Adults measure approximately 50 mm (2.0 in) wide and 80 mm (3.1 in) long and have a rostrum of about 10 mm (0.39 in).

== Distribution and habitat ==
Cryptolithodes expansus can be found in both the western and eastern Pacific Ocean. In the west, it can be found along the Japanese and Korean coasts, and in the east, it can be found as far south as British Columbia. In Japan, it is distributed from Rishiri Island to Nanao Bay on the Sea of Japan coast and from Yūbetsu to Iwaki on the Pacific coast.

== See also ==
- Cryptolithodes typicus
- Cryptolithodes sitchensis
