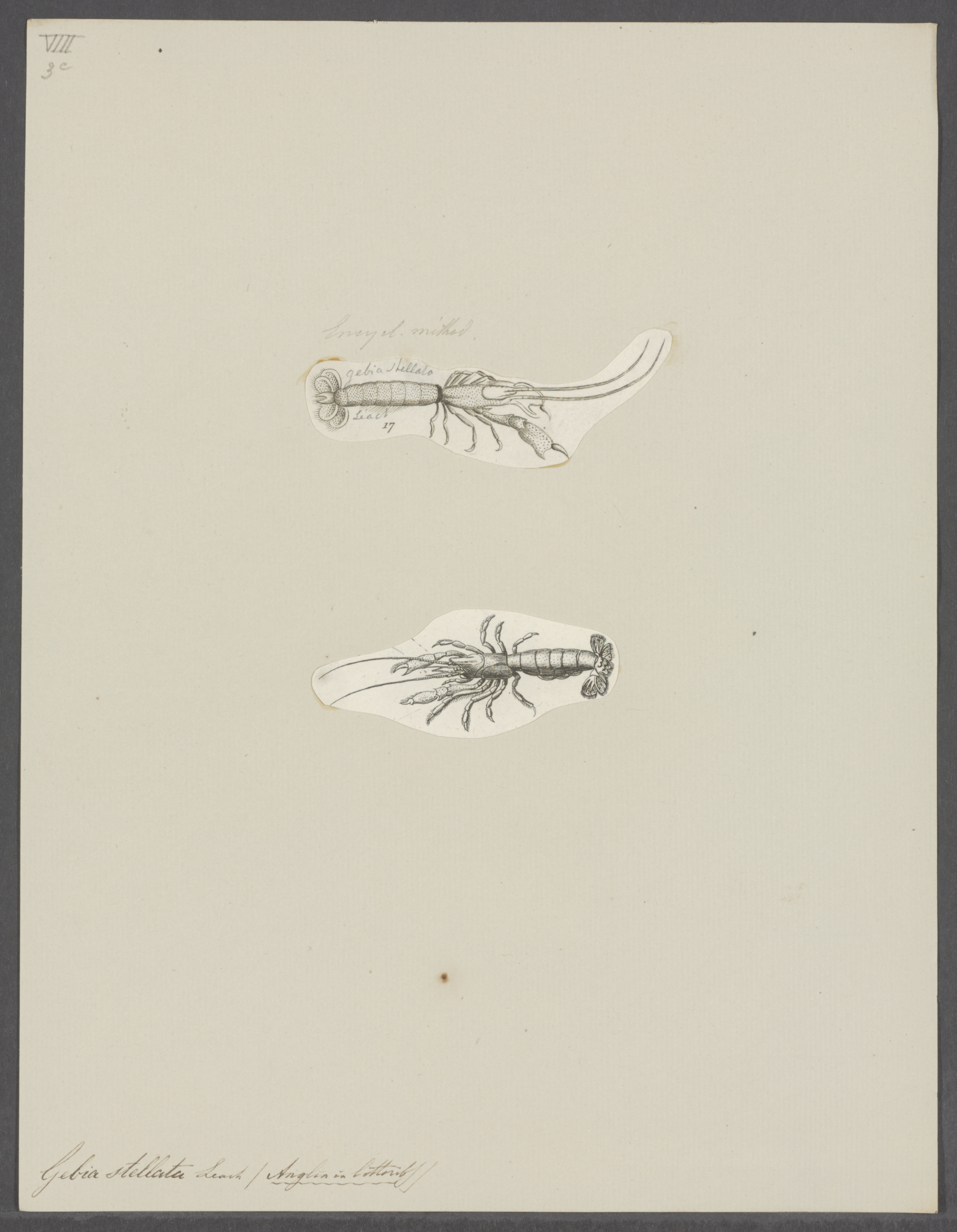

Conservation status
- Not evaluated (IUCN 3.1)

Scientific classification
- Kingdom: Animalia
- Phylum: Arthropoda
- Class: Malacostraca
- Order: Decapoda
- Suborder: Pleocyemata
- Family: Upogebiidae
- Genus: Upogebia
- Species: U. stellata

Binomial name
- Upogebia stellata (Montagu, 1808)

Synonyms
- Cancer (Astacus) stellatus Montagu, 1808; Gebia stellata (Montagu, 1808) ·

= Upogebia stellata =

Species of crustacean

Upogebia stellata is a species of mud shrimp in the family Upogebiidae.

== Description ==
Upogebia stellata is up to 5 centimetres (2 in) long; it is yellow-white, sometimes with orange spots. Its anatomy is described thus:

- carapace with strong cervical groove
- anterior lateral border has a small ocular spine
- hairy rostrum
- chelipeds equal in size, long and slender
- ventral margin of manus has dense rows of hairs
- outer extremity of carpus has a long spine

The specific name stellata means "starred" in Latin, referring to the spots on its body.

== Distribution ==
Upogebia stellata is found in the eastern Atlantic. It is common around Great Britain and Ireland, also being found off Norway and Spain, and in the Mediterranean.

== Ecology ==
U. stellata is part of the infauna, living permanently in burrows in the seafloor. It digs long tunnels in the mud up to 100 ft (30 m) in length. It is a suspension feeder. Courtship is practiced through olfactory and tactile cues; sperm transfer is indirect.
