= U. africana =

U. africana may refer to:

- Upogebia africana, a mud shrimp species
- Upupa africana, a hoopoe species

== See also ==
- Africana (disambiguation)
