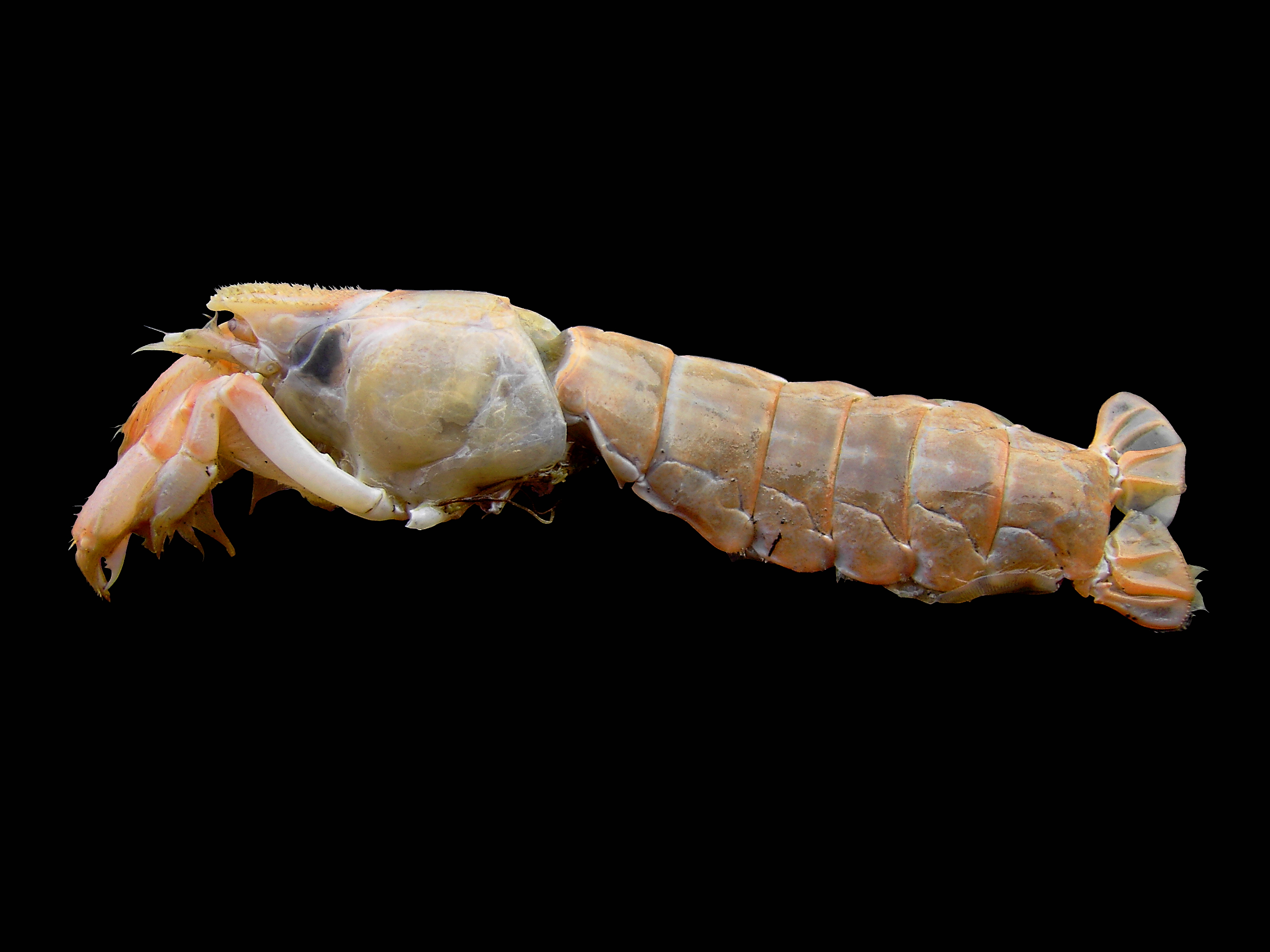
- Upogebia deltaura

Scientific classification
- Kingdom: Animalia
- Phylum: Arthropoda
- Clade: Pancrustacea
- Class: Malacostraca
- Order: Decapoda
- Suborder: Pleocyemata
- Family: Upogebiidae
- Genus: Upogebia; Borradaile, 1903

Species
- See text.

= Upogebia =

Genus of crustaceans

Upogebia is a genus of mud shrimp, in the family Upogebiidae, containing the following species:

- Upogebia acanthops Williams, 1986
- Upogebia acanthura (Coêlho, 1973)
- Upogebia acarinicauda Sakai, 2006
- Upogebia aestuari Williams, 1993
- Upogebia affinis (Say, 1818)
- Upogebia africana (Ortmann, 1894)
- Upogebia allobranchus Ngoc-Ho, 1991
- Upogebia allspachi Sakai, 2006
- Upogebia amboinensis (De Man, 1888)
- Upogebia anacanthus Ngoc-Ho, 1994
- Upogebia ancylodactyla De Man, 1905
- Upogebia annae Thistle, 1973
- Upogebia aquilina Williams, 1993
- Upogebia aristata Le Loeuff & Intes, 1974
- Upogebia assisi Barnard, 1947
- Upogebia australiensis De Man, 1927
- Upogebia australis Thatje & Gerdes, 2000
- Upogebia baldwini Williams, 1997
- Upogebia balmaorum Ngoc-Ho, 1990
- Upogebia balssi De Man, 1927
- Upogebia barbata (Strahl, 1862)
- Upogebia baweana Tirmizi & Kazmi, 1979
- Upogebia borradailei Sakai, 1982
- Upogebia bowerbankii (Miers, 1884)
- Upogebia brasiliensis Holthuis, 1956
- Upogebia brucei Sakai, 1975
- Upogebia burkenroadi Williams, 1986
- Upogebia capensis (Krauss, 1843)
- Upogebia careospina Williams, 1993
- Upogebia cargadensis Borradaile, 1910
- Upogebia carinicauda (Stimpson, 1860)
- Upogebia casis Williams, 1993
- Upogebia corallifora Williams & Scott, 1989
- Upogebia cortesi Williams & Vargas, 2000
- Upogebia crosnieri Le Loeuff & Intes, 1974
- Upogebia darwinii (Miers, 1884)
- Upogebia dawsoni Williams, 1986
- Upogebia deltaura (Leach, 1815)
- Upogebia demani de Saint Laurent & Le Loeuff, 1979
- Upogebia digitina (Sakai, 1975)
- Upogebia dromana Poore & Griffin, 1979
- Upogebia felderi Williams, 1993
- Upogebia fijiensis Sakai, 1982
- Upogebia furcata (Aurivillius, 1898)
- Upogebia galapagensis Williams, 1986
- Upogebia hexaceras (Ortmann, 1894)
- Upogebia hirtifrons (White, 1847)
- Upogebia holthuisi Sakai, 1982
- Upogebia imperfecta Sakai, 1982
- Upogebia inomissa Williams, 1993
- Upogebia intermedia (De Man, 1888)
- Upogebia iriomotensis Sakai & Hirano, 2006
- Upogebia issaeffi (Balss, 1913)
- Upogebia jamaicensis Thistle, 1973
- Upogebia jonesi Williams, 1986
- Upogebia kempi Shenoy, 1967
- Upogebia kuekenthali Sakai, 1982
- Upogebia laemanu Ngoc-Ho, 1990
- Upogebia lenzrichtersi Sakai, 1982
- Upogebia lepta Williams, 1986
- Upogebia lincolni Ngoc-Ho, 1977
- Upogebia litoralis Petanga, 1792
- Upogebia longicauda Sakai, 1975
- Upogebia longipollex (Streets, 1871)
- Upogebia maccraryae Williams, 1986
- Upogebia macginitieorum Williams, 1986
- Upogebia major (De Haan, 1841)
- Upogebia marina Coêlho, 1973
- Upogebia mediterranea Noël, 1992
- Upogebia miyakei Sakai, 1967
- Upogebia molipollex Williams, 1993
- Upogebia mortenseni Sakai, 2006
- Upogebia neglecta De Man, 1927
- Upogebia nitida (A. Milne-Edwards, 1868)
- Upogebia noronhensis Fausto-Filho, 1969
- Upogebia octoceras (Nobili, 1904)
- Upogebia omissa Gomes Corrêa, 1968
- Upogebia omissago Williams, 1993
- Upogebia onychion Williams, 1986
- Upogebia osidiris Nobili, 1904
- Upogebia ovalis Ngoc-Ho, 1991
- Upogebia paraffinis Williams, 1993
- Upogebia pillsburyi Williams, 1993
- Upogebia poensis de Saint Laurent & Ngoc-Ho, 1979
- Upogebia pseudochelata Tattersall, 1921
- Upogebia pugettensis (Dana, 1852)
- Upogebia pugnax De Man, 1905
- Upogebia pusilla (Petagna, 1792)
- Upogebia quddusiae Tirmizi & Ghani, 1978
- Upogebia ramphula Williams, 1986
- Upogebia rhadames Nobili, 1904
- Upogebia rostrospinosa Bott, 1955
- Upogebia saigusai Sakai & Hirano, 2006
- Upogebia saintlaurentae Ngoc-Ho, 2008
- Upogebia sakaii Ngoc-Ho, 1994
- Upogebia savignyi (Strahl, 1862)
- Upogebia schmitti Williams, 1986
- Upogebia senegalensis Ngoc-Ho, 2001
- Upogebia seychellensis Sakai, 1982
- Upogebia shenchiajuii Yu, 1931
- Upogebia snelliusi Ngoc-Ho, 1989
- Upogebia spinidactylus Sakai & Hirano, 2006
- Upogebia spinigera (Smith, 1871)
- Upogebia spinimanus Ngoc-Ho, 1994
- Upogebia spinistipula Williams & Heard, 1991
- Upogebia spongium Sakai, 1975
- Upogebia srilankaensis Sakai, 2006
- Upogebia stellata (Montagu, 1808)
- Upogebia stenorhynchus Ngoc-Ho, 1991
- Upogebia tenuipollex Williams, 1986
- Upogebia thistlei Williams, 1986
- Upogebia tipica (Nardo, 1869)
- Upogebia toralae Williams & Hernández-Aguilera, 1998
- Upogebia tractabilis Hale, 1941
- Upogebia vargasae Williams, 1997
- Upogebia vasquezi Ngoc-Ho, 1989
- Upogebia veleronis Williams, 1986
- Upogebia wuhsienweni Yu, 1931
- Upogebia yokoyai Makarov, 1938

The generic name is from Greek ὑπό (hypo, "under"), γῆ (gē, Earth") and βια (bia, "force"), meaning "underground digger."
