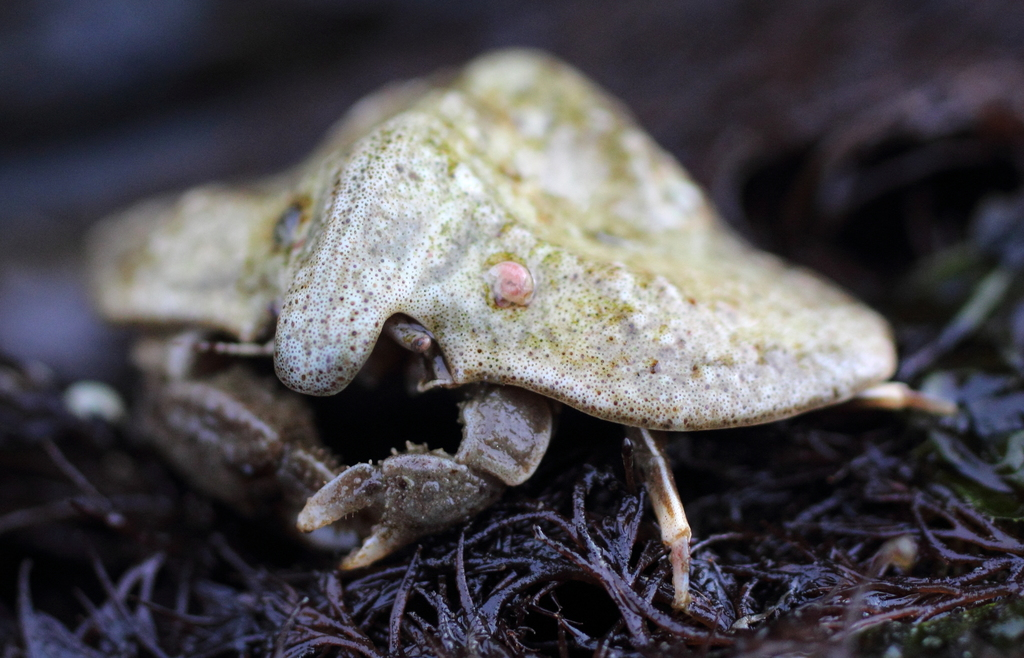
- Cryptolithodes typicus

Scientific classification
- Kingdom: Animalia
- Phylum: Arthropoda
- Class: Malacostraca
- Order: Decapoda
- Suborder: Pleocyemata
- Infraorder: Anomura
- Family: Lithodidae
- Subfamily: Lithodinae
- Genus: Cryptolithodes; Brandt, 1848

Type species
- Cryptolithodes typicus Brandt, 1848

= Cryptolithodes =

Genus of king crabs

Cryptolithodes is a genus of king crabs, containing the following three species:

Image	Scientific name	Common name	Distribution	References
	Cryptolithodes expansus Miers, 1879	メンコガニ	Japan, Korean coast, British Columbia	
	Cryptolithodes sitchensis Brandt, 1853	Umbrella crab	Northeastern Pacific Ocean	
	Cryptolithodes typicus Brandt, 1848	Butterfly crab, turtle crab	Northeastern Pacific Ocean	

== Etymology ==
The name "Cryptolithodes" means "hidden stone".
