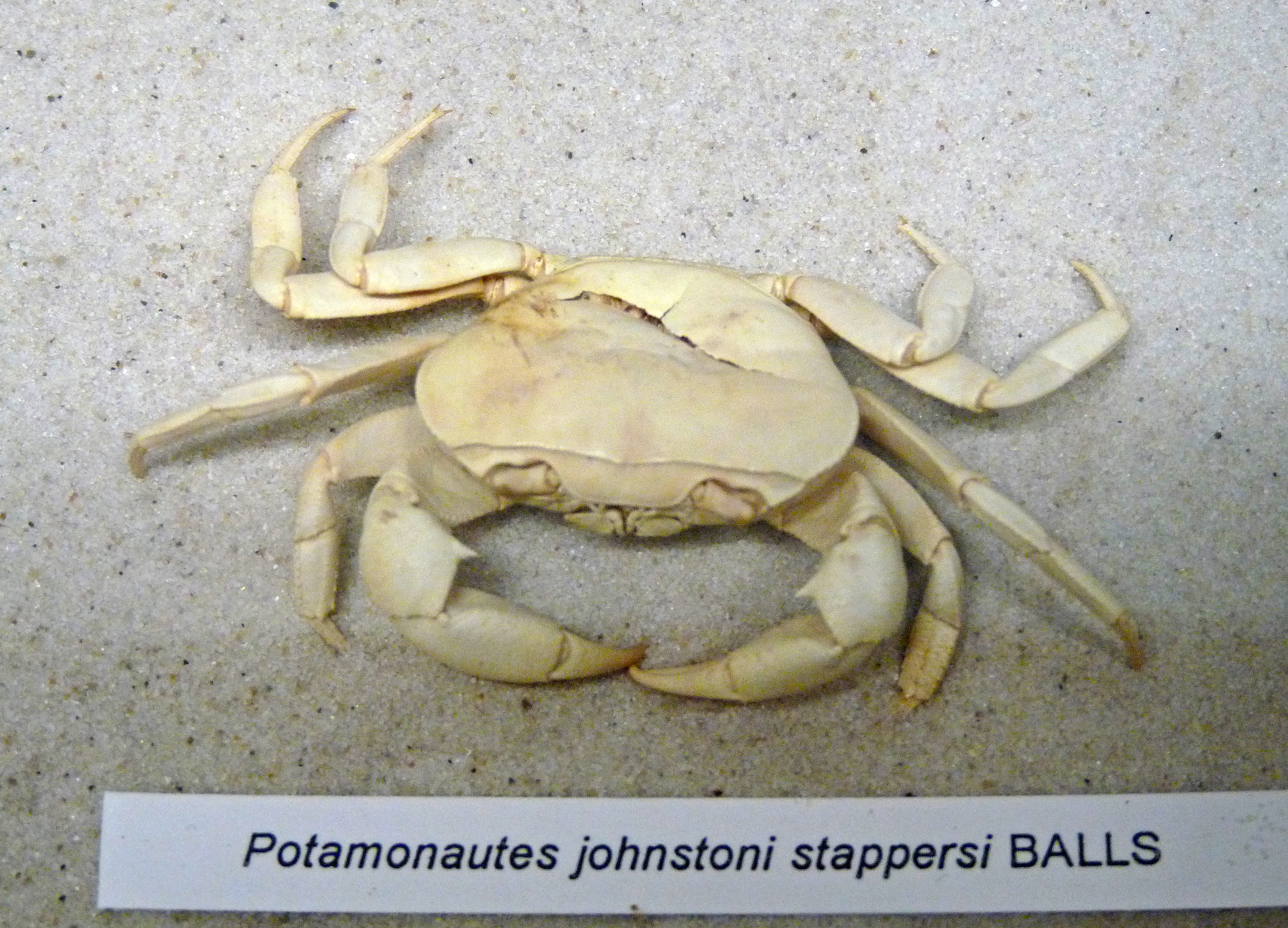

Conservation status
- Least Concern (IUCN 3.1)

Scientific classification
- Kingdom: Animalia
- Phylum: Arthropoda
- Class: Malacostraca
- Order: Decapoda
- Suborder: Pleocyemata
- Infraorder: Brachyura
- Family: Potamonautidae
- Genus: Arcopotamonautes
- Species: A. johnstoni

Binomial name
- Arcopotamonautes johnstoni (Miers, 1885)

= Arcopotamonautes johnstoni =

Species of crab

Arcopotamonautes johnstoni is a species of freshwater crab in the family Potamonautidae. It is found in rivers in Kenya and Tanzania, with unconfirmed records from Malawi and the Democratic Republic of the Congo. The species' distribution includes Kilimanjaro, Nekona, Mrogoro (near Dar es Salaam) and the Usambara Mountains.
