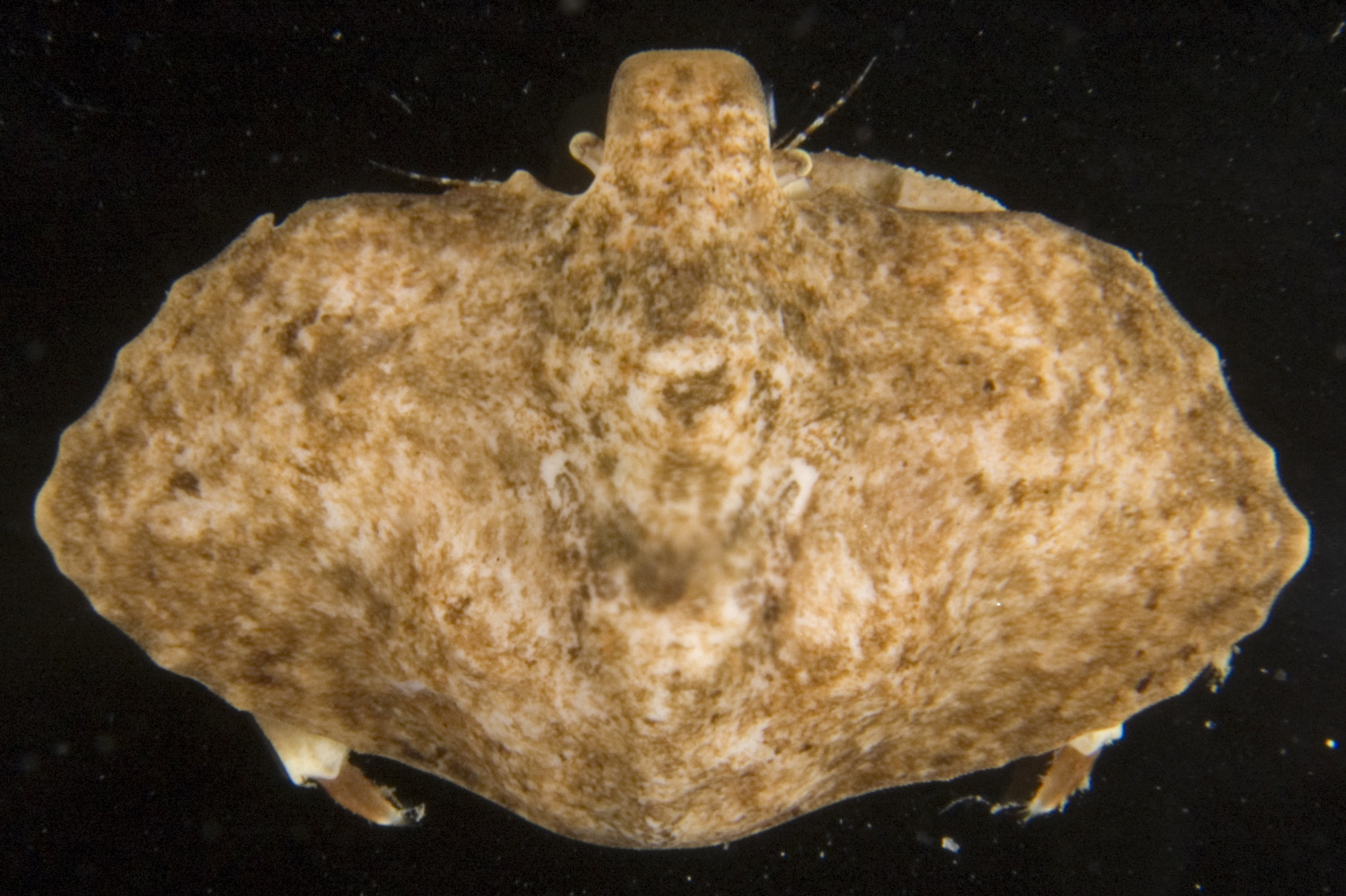

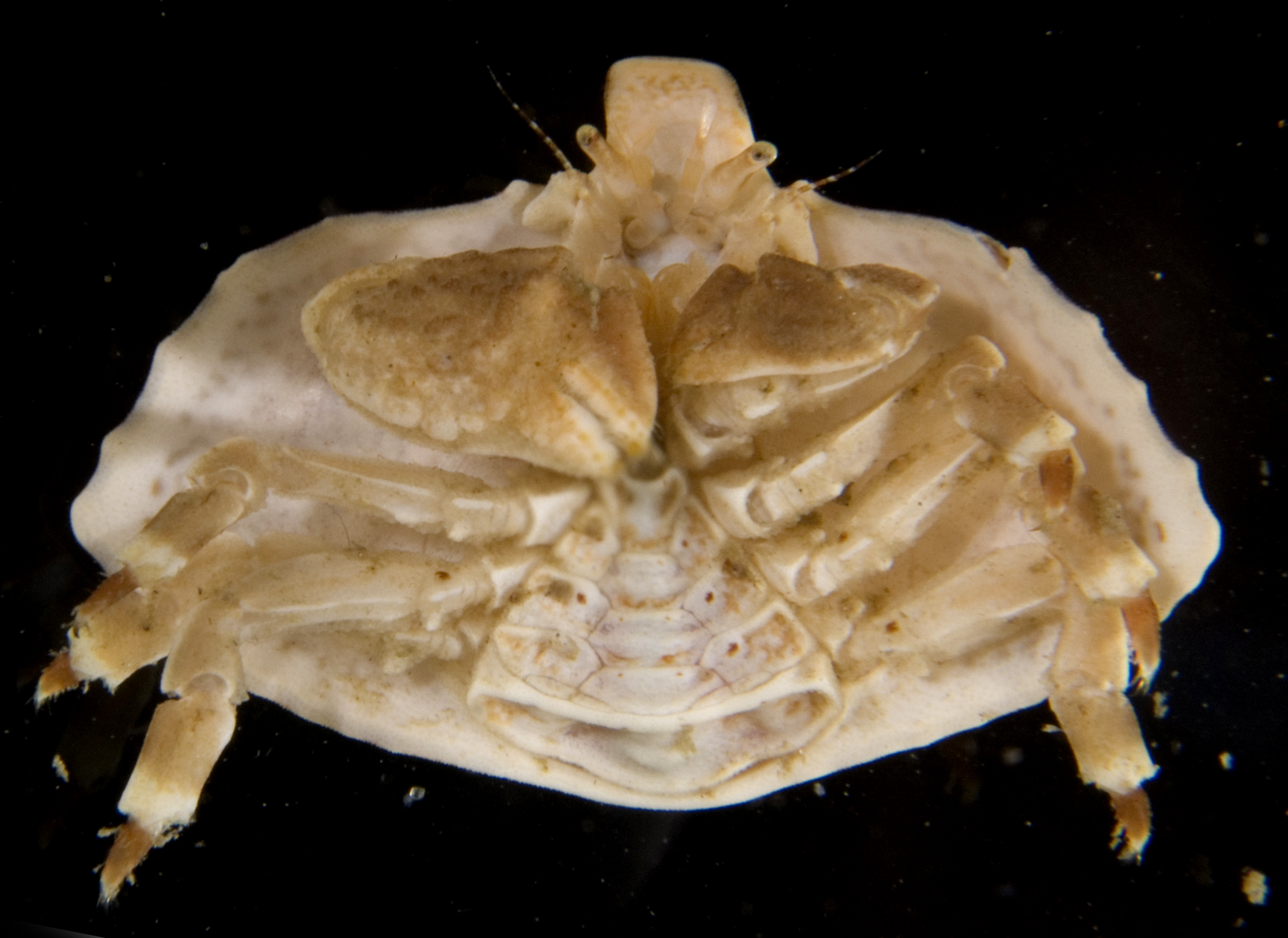

Conservation status
- Secure (NatureServe)

Scientific classification
- Domain: Eukaryota
- Kingdom: Animalia
- Phylum: Arthropoda
- Class: Malacostraca
- Order: Decapoda
- Suborder: Pleocyemata
- Infraorder: Anomura
- Family: Lithodidae
- Genus: Cryptolithodes
- Species: C. typicus

Binomial name
- Cryptolithodes typicus Brandt, 1849

= Butterfly crab =

Species of king crab

Cryptolithodes typicus, often referred to as the butterfly crab or the turtle crab, is a species of lithodid crustacean native to coastal regions of the northeastern Pacific Ocean, ranging from Amchitka Island, Alaska to Santa Rosa Island, California.

== Description ==
The crab's butterfly-shaped carapace has a stone-like camouflage, which it uses to blend in against the rocks of the subtidal and low intertidal zones. Carapace color within the species varies greatly, but small individuals (< 15 mm (0.6 in) in length) are typically white, while larger ones tend to have an assortment of vibrant colors. The carapace is exceptionally broad and completely hides the appendages when viewed from above or from the side; it has a median raised crest which is often a different color that contrasts with other parts. The male carapace is at its widest at a point further back than that of the female. The chelipeds of the male are relatively larger than the widest point of the female. The right claw is larger than the left and both claws are sharp, curved, and stout. Each segment of the walking legs has a dorsal crest.

== Distribution ==
The butterfly crab resides on rocks within the subtidal and low intertidal zones. When its intertidal habitat is exposed to the atmosphere during extreme low tide, it can be found clinging to the substratum in rock crevices or at the base of the seagrass Phyllospadix. It has been found to a depth of 73 meters (240 ft).

== Taxonomy ==
The genus name "Cryptolithodes" means "hidden stone", while its species name "typicus" denotes it as the genus' type species. The nickname "butterfly crab" is derived from the crab's carapace, which resembles a butterfly, and the nickname "turtle crab" derives from the way its carapace covers its appendages from above and the sides.

== See also ==
- Cryptolithodes sitchensis, the umbrella crab
- Cryptolithodes expansus
- Intertidal ecology
