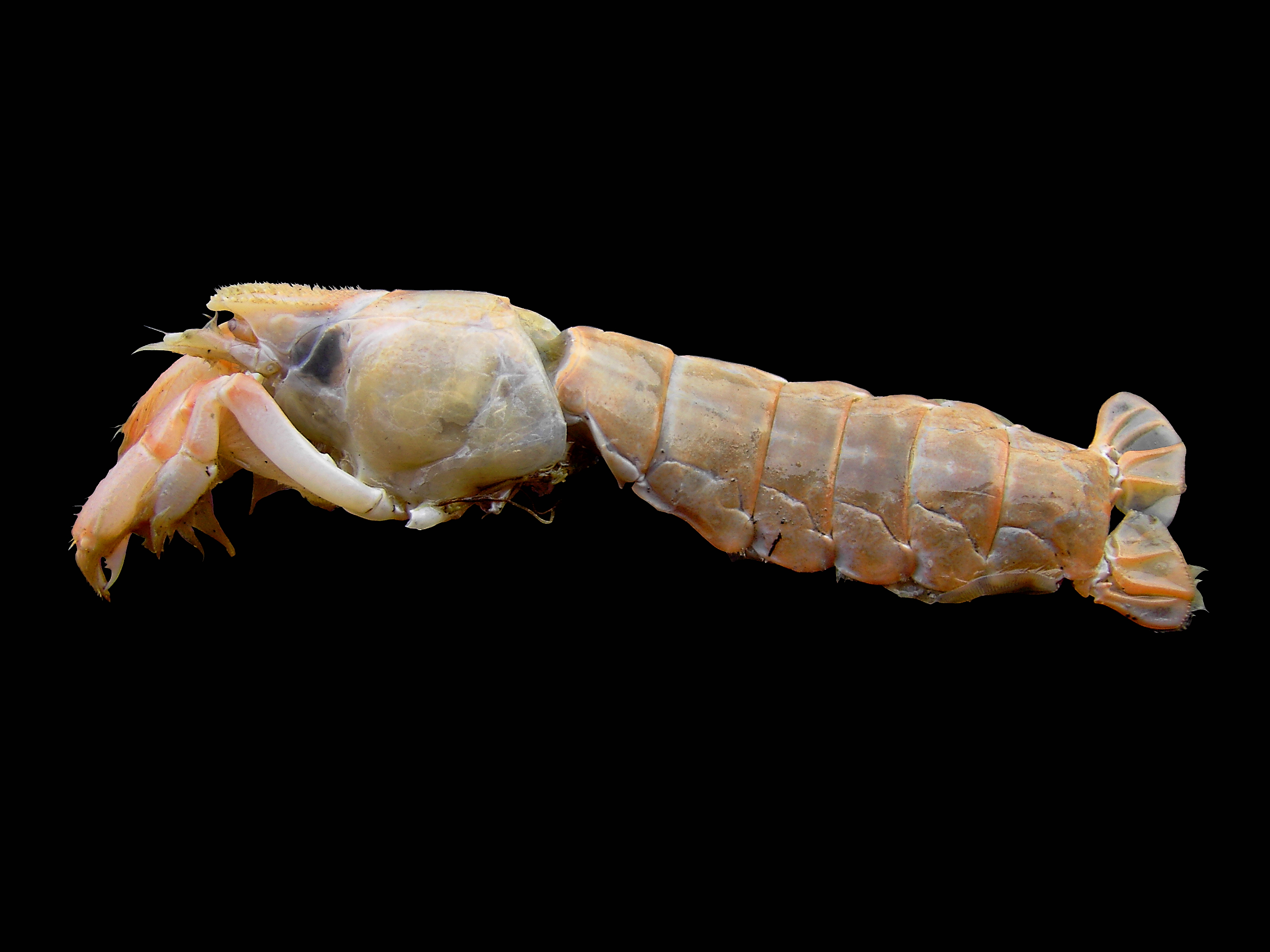

Scientific classification
- Kingdom: Animalia
- Phylum: Arthropoda
- Class: Malacostraca
- Order: Decapoda
- Suborder: Pleocyemata
- Family: Upogebiidae
- Genus: Upogebia
- Species: U. deltaura

Binomial name
- Upogebia deltaura (Leach, 1815)

Synonyms
- Gebia deltaura Leach, 1815

= Upogebia deltaura =

Species of crustacean

Upogebia deltaura is a species of mud lobster from the Atlantic Ocean and Mediterranean Sea.

== Description ==
Upogebia deltaura is up to 100 millimetres (3.9 in) long, and is a dirty yellow colour, tinged with green, white or red. It is often confused with other species which it closely resembles, such as Upogebia stellata, which has additional ocular spines and a narrower abdomen. The mouthparts are densely setose, which helps to filter particles out of the water.

== Distribution ==
Upogebia deltaura is found in the eastern Atlantic from Sognefjord, Norway to Spain, and throughout the Mediterranean Sea as well as in the Black Sea. It may also extend as far as Togo, West Africa, but possible confusion with other taxa makes this difficult to assess.

== Ecology ==
Upogebia deltaura lives in burrows at up to 190 metres (620 ft) depth, and will make use of burrows dug by other animals. U. deltaura is the most abundant large crustacean and the deepest burrowing (up to 68 centimetres or 27 inches) large animal in Scottish maerl beds, and will reconstruct its burrow after disturbance by storms or trawling.
