= Porcellionides approximatus =

Scientific classification
- Kingdom: Animalia
- Phylum: Arthropoda
- Class: Malacostraca
- Order: Isopoda
- Suborder: Oniscidea
- Family: Porcellionidae
- Genus: Porcellionides
- Species: P. approximatus

Binomial name
- Porcellionides approximatus (Budde-Lund, 1885)

Synonyms
- Metoponorthus approximatus (Budde-Lund, 1885)

Species of woodlouse

Porcellionides approximatus is a woodlouse that is endemic to Crimea, Ukraine.
