= Porcellionides myrmicidarum =

Scientific classification
- Kingdom: Animalia
- Phylum: Arthropoda
- Class: Malacostraca
- Order: Isopoda
- Suborder: Oniscidea
- Family: Porcellionidae
- Genus: Porcellionides
- Species: P. myrmicidarum

Binomial name
- Porcellionides myrmicidarum (Verhoeff, 1918)

Synonyms
- Metoponorthus myrmicidarum

Species of woodlouse

Porcellionides myrmicidarum is a species of woodlouse in the Porcellionidae family that is endemic to Sicily.
