= Porcellionides buddelundi =

Scientific classification
- Kingdom: Animalia
- Phylum: Arthropoda
- Class: Malacostraca
- Order: Isopoda
- Suborder: Oniscidea
- Family: Porcellionidae
- Genus: Porcellionides
- Species: P. buddelundi

Binomial name
- Porcellionides buddelundi (Verhoeff, 1901)

Synonyms
- Porcellio atlanticus Verhoeff, 1937; Porcellionides atlanticus (Arcangeli, 1936); Porcellio buddelundi

Species of woodlouse

Porcellionides buddelundi is a woodlouse found in Portugal and Spain.
