= Porcellionides virgatus =

Scientific classification
- Kingdom: Animalia
- Phylum: Arthropoda
- Class: Malacostraca
- Order: Isopoda
- Suborder: Oniscidea
- Family: Porcellionidae
- Genus: Porcellionides
- Species: P. virgatus

Binomial name
- Porcellionides virgatus (Budde-Lund, 1885)

Synonyms
- Porcellionides mulaiki Van Name, 1936

Species of woodlouse

Porcellionides virgatus is a species of woodlouse in the family Porcellionidae. It is found in North America and Mexico.
