= Porcellionides apulicus =

Scientific classification
- Kingdom: Animalia
- Phylum: Arthropoda
- Class: Malacostraca
- Order: Isopoda
- Suborder: Oniscidea
- Family: Porcellionidae
- Genus: Porcellionides
- Species: P. apulicus

Binomial name
- Porcellionides apulicus Arcangeli, 1932

Species of woodlouse

Porcellionides apulicus is a woodlouse that is endemic to Italy.
