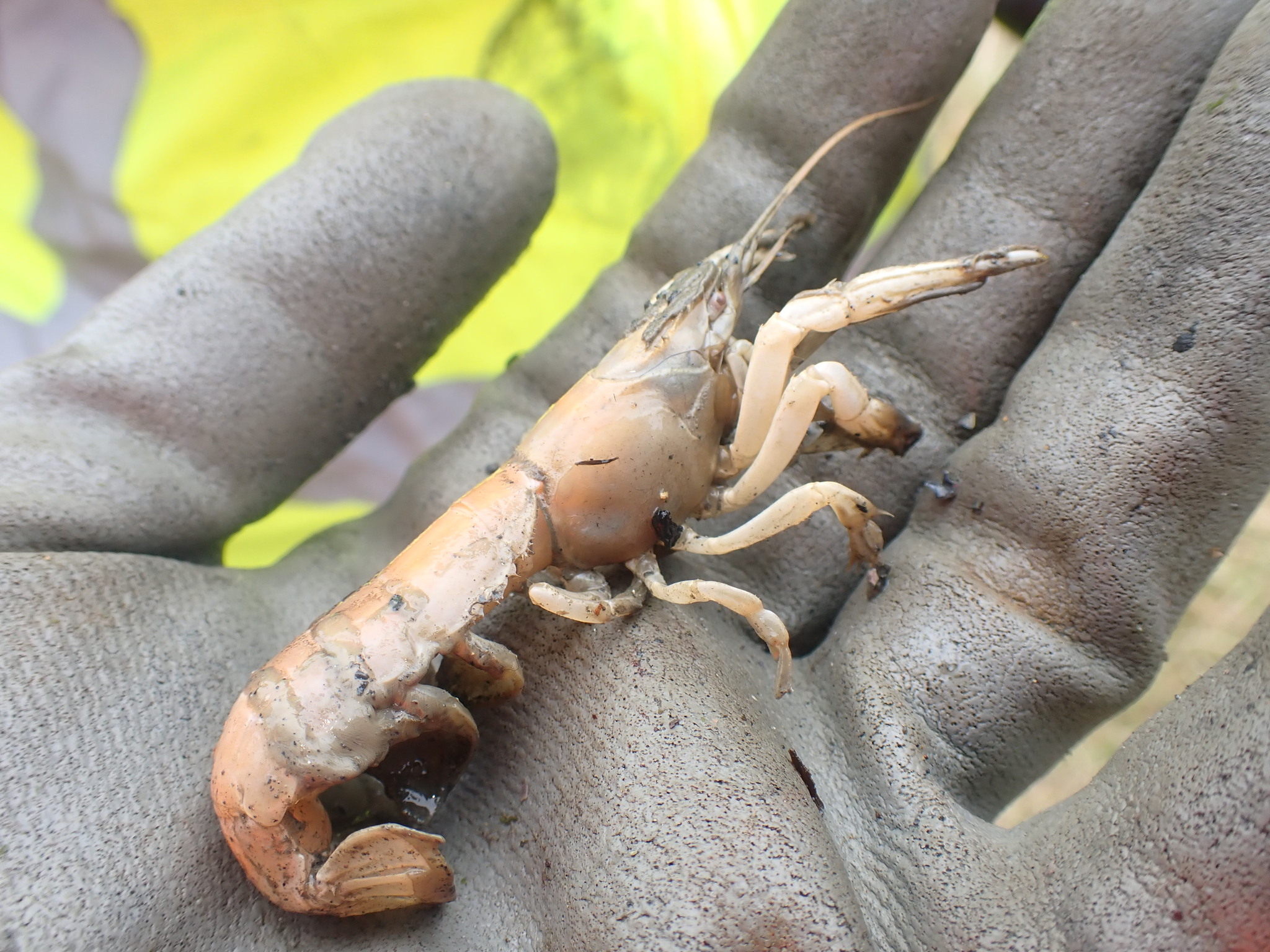
- Live U. hirtifrons hauled up from the ocean

Scientific classification
- Kingdom: Animalia
- Phylum: Arthropoda
- Class: Malacostraca
- Order: Decapoda
- Suborder: Pleocyemata
- Family: Upogebiidae
- Genus: Upogebia
- Species: U. hirtifrons

Binomial name
- Upogebia hirtifrons (White, 1847)

Synonyms
- Gebia hirtifrons White, 1847; Upogebia (Upogebia) hirtifrons (White, 1847)

= Upogebia hirtifrons =

Species of crustacean

Upogebia hirtifrons is a species of mud shrimp endemic to New Zealand. They were first described by Scottish zoologist Adam White from a specimen collected during the Ross Expedition to Antarctica. As adults, they are roughly 70 mm in length and are a pale brown colour. They occur throughout the coasts of the North Island and northern South Island, where they live in burrows in soft sediment. In their burrows, they use their legs to generate a water current and then they feed on particles filtered from the water. The parasitic isopod Gyge angularis is known to feed on their blood.

== Taxonomy ==
This species was first described as Gebia hirtifrons in 1847 by Scottish zoologist Adam White from a single juvenile specimen. The specimen was collected during the Ross expedition, but the exact location it was collected from is unclear. The type specimen is stored in the Natural History Museum of London. In 1907, the species was transferred to the genus Upogebia and it underwent a redescription that also confirmed it occurs in New Zealand. It has undergone several revisions, with the most recent one being in 1982.

== Description ==
As adults, they are roughly 70 mm in length, with the cephalothorax (fused head and thorax region) being 22 mm and the abdomen being 48 mm. They are coloured pale brown.

Several characteristics distinguish this from other Upogebia species. The rostrum (extension at the front of the cephalothorax) is broad, rounded at the front with four to five small tooth-like projections. On the upper margins of the cephalothorax there is a single spine. The first pereiopod (leg-like structures) have claws where one pincer is longer than the other. The carpus (fifth segment of the leg) has two distinct teeth near their end. At the base of the claw (referred to as the "palm"), there are eleven to twelve teeth distributed throughout it and tufts of hair in a row on the outer surface.

== Distribution and habitat ==
U. hirtifrons are endemic to New Zealand. They occur along the coasts of the North Island and northern South Island. They occur in the intertidal and subtidal zones in soft sediments. In the sediment, they create burrows that may have several entrances that connect to larger chambers. A water current is created throughout the burrow by beating their pleopods. From this current, they feed on food particles strained out of the water using setae on their first pair of walking legs. The maxillipeds are used to transfer food from the legs to the mouth.

== Parasites ==
U. hirtifrons are known to be parasitised by Gyge angularis, a species of isopod. The isopod lives on the outside of the mud shrimp and feeds on their blood.
