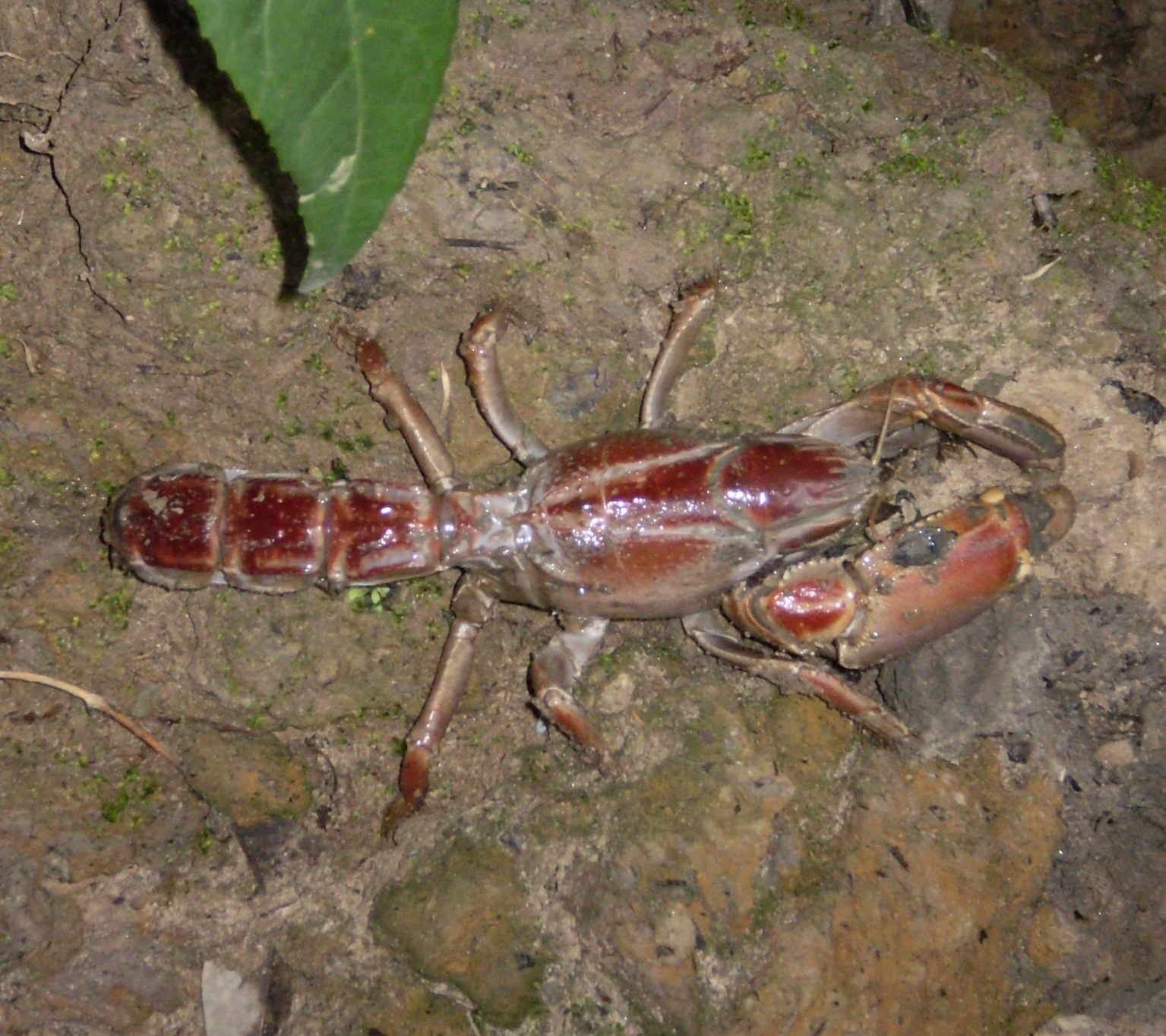

Scientific classification
- Kingdom: Animalia
- Phylum: Arthropoda
- Clade: Pancrustacea
- Class: Malacostraca
- Order: Decapoda
- Suborder: Pleocyemata
- Family: Thalassinidae
- Genus: Thalassina
- Species: T. anomala

Binomial name
- Thalassina anomala (Herbst, 1804)

Synonyms
- Cancer anomalus Herbst, 1804; Thalassina chilensis Steenstrup & Lutken, 1862; Thalassina maxima Hess, 1865; Thalassina scabra Leach, 1814; Thalassina scorpionides Latreille, 1806

= Thalassina anomala =

Species of crustacean

Thalassina anomala, known as the scorpion mud lobster, is a species of crustacean in the family Thalassinidae.

== Description ==
Thalassina anomala are typically 16–20 centimetres (6.3–7.9 in) in length, with records of specimens up to 30 centimetres (12 in) long. Its body is yellow to reddish-brown.

== Distribution ==
T. anomala is found in the Indo-West Pacific region. It is the most common decapod crustacean in the Sundarbans in India and Bangladesh, though it is often overlooked in traditional sampling efforts.

== Ecology and behavior ==
Its habitat includes littoral and supralittoral zones such as those in mangroves and estuaries. Excavated mud from their nighttime burrowing activities can form hills that reach heights of 3 metres (9.8 ft). The burrows are estimated at 2.5 metres (8.2 ft) in depth. In the monsoon season, its muddy nest becomes saturated with water and submerges, and the lobster is exposed, allowing it to be easily caught.

T. anomala is considered of high importance ecologically, as its nightly burrowing pushes deep soil to the surface, while also helping the import of aerated tidal water up to 2.5 meters deep. The mud mounds provide habitat for other animals including Odontomachus malignus (an ant), termites, Episesarma singaporense (tree-climbing crab), Wolffogebia phuketensis (mangrove mud shrimp), Acrochordus granulatus (file snake), and plants such as the tree Excoecaria agallochoa and ferns.

== Relation to Humans ==
In Thailand, the meat of this animal was believed to cure athsma, and was therefore eaten in Ancient times. This practice is no longer common as numbers of T. anomala have declined.
