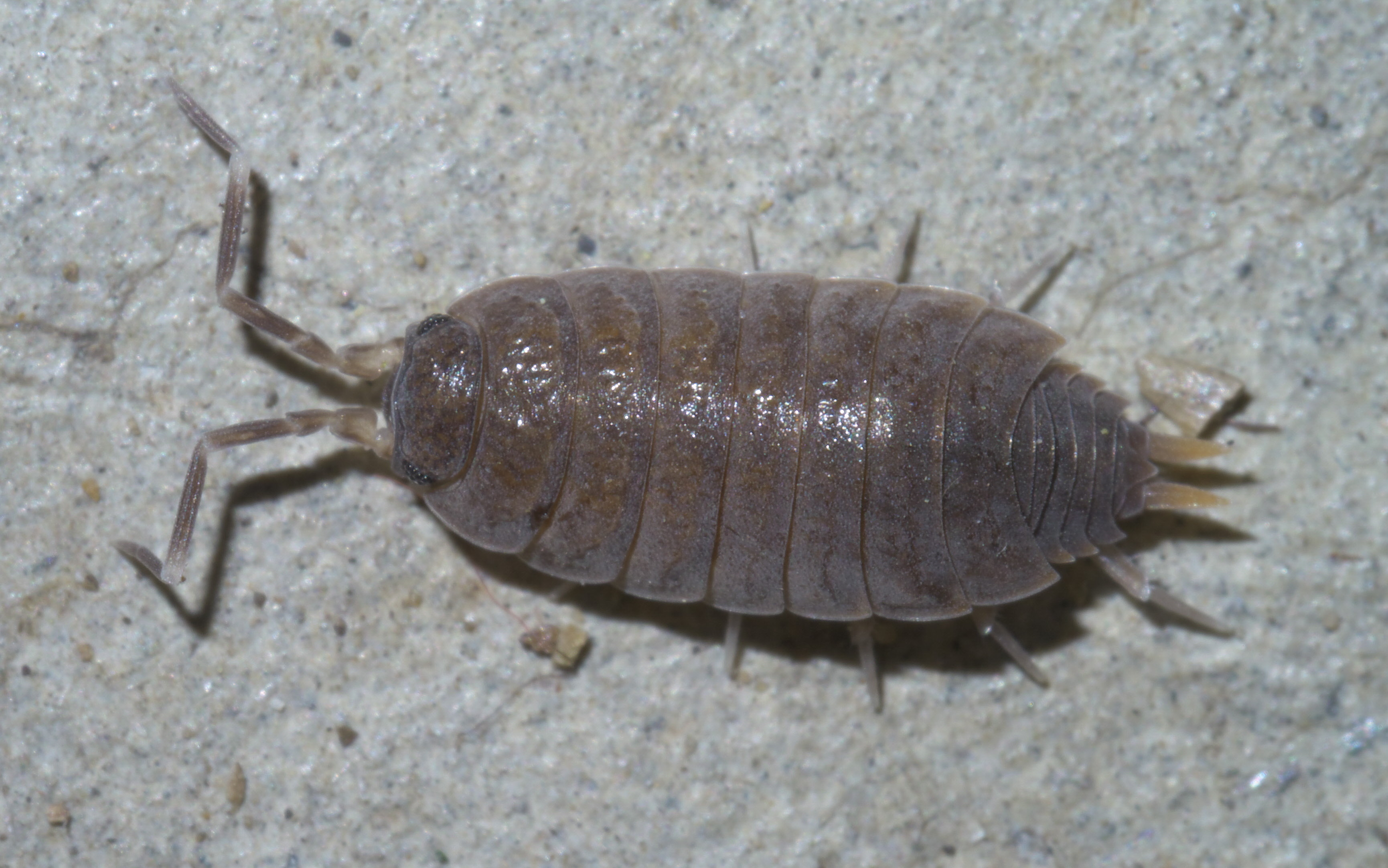

Scientific classification
- Kingdom: Animalia
- Phylum: Arthropoda
- Clade: Pancrustacea
- Class: Malacostraca
- Order: Isopoda
- Suborder: Oniscidea
- Family: Porcellionidae
- Genus: Porcellionides
- Species: P. pruinosus

Binomial name
- Porcellionides pruinosus (Brandt, 1833)

= Porcellionides pruinosus =

Species of woodlouse

Porcellionides pruinosus is a cosmopolitan and detrivorous woodlouse that is native to Europe, and is suspected to consist of very closely related species, forming a species complex. Ten subspecies are recognised. This species complex is a frequently utilized study system for understanding the effects of pesticides and other chemical contaminants on decomposers.

The species carries Wolbachia endosymbionts, which is an alpha-proteobacterium that is known to modify the reproduction of their crustacean hosts by inducing cytoplasmic incompatibility or feminisation.

== See also ==
- List of woodlice of the British Isles

== Porcellionides pruinosus as a pet ==
Since it is easy to keep, the species is bred as a food source for pets or as a pet itself. There are now numerous color forms such as "Orange", "Powder Orange", "White Out", "Oreo Crumble", "Red Koi", "Powder Blue", and "orange cream" although this is the nominated form. Some cultivated forms are traded for high prices by breeders.

These detrivorous isopods are relatively fast breeders and low maintenance and they prefer humid environments. They live for eleven to fourteen months in the wild, but can live two or three years in captivity.
