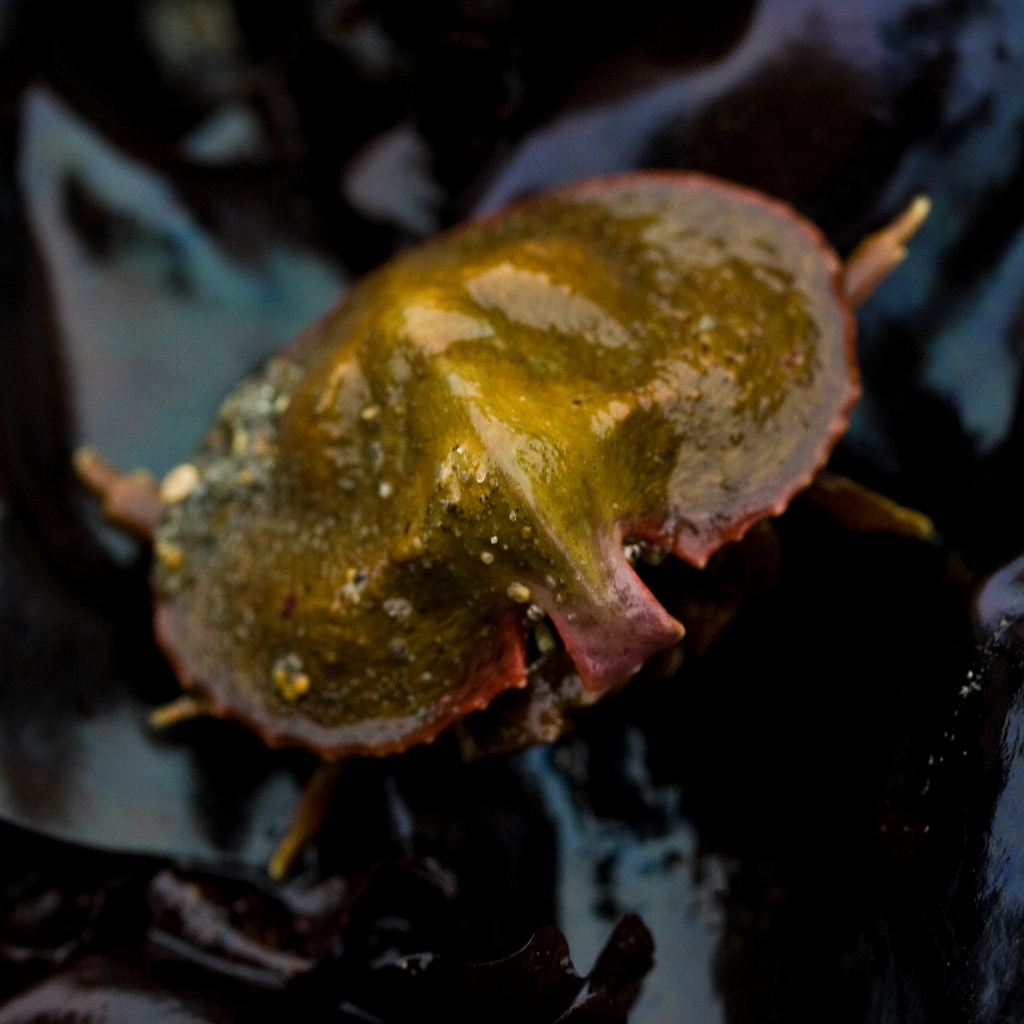

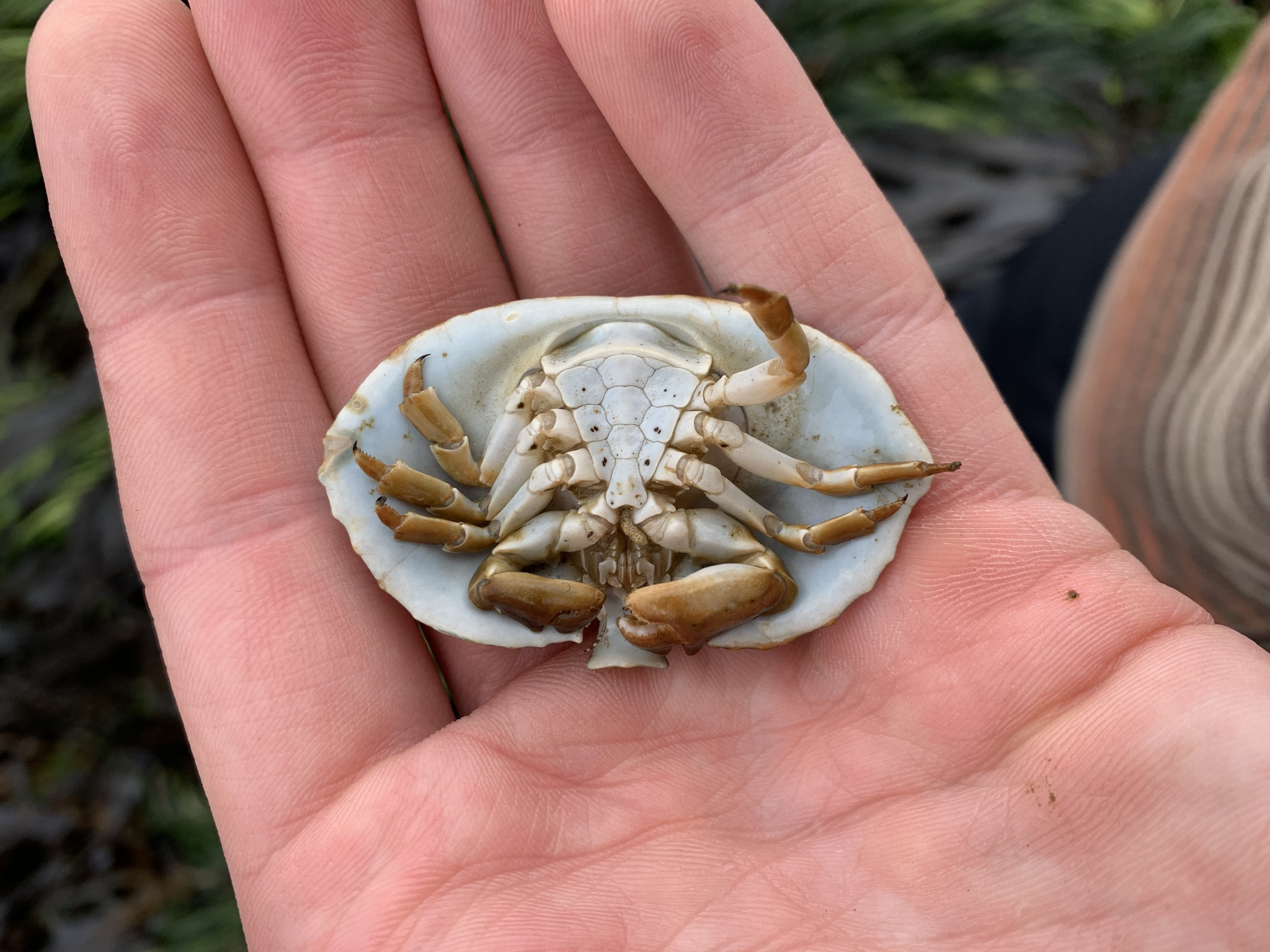

Scientific classification
- Kingdom: Animalia
- Phylum: Arthropoda
- Class: Malacostraca
- Order: Decapoda
- Suborder: Pleocyemata
- Infraorder: Anomura
- Family: Lithodidae
- Genus: Cryptolithodes
- Species: C. sitchensis

Binomial name
- Cryptolithodes sitchensis Brandt, 1853

Synonyms
- Cryptolithodes altafissura Spence Bate, 1865; Cryptolithodes alta-fissura Spence Bate, 1865

= Cryptolithodes sitchensis =

Species of king crab

Cryptolithodes sitchensis, known as the umbrella crab and the turtle crab, is a species of king crab native to coastal regions of the northeastern regions of the Pacific Ocean, ranging from Sitka, Alaska to Point Loma, California. Its carapace extends over its legs such that when it pulls in its legs, it resembles a small stone. It lives in rocky areas from the low intertidal to depths of 37 m (121 ft).

== Description ==
Cryptolithodes sitchensis' carapace is ovate, nearly smooth, and extends over all of its three pairs of walking legs and two chelipeds. It is generally about 5/3 as wide as it is long and can be over 5 cm (2.0 in) wide at the adult stage. It ranges from neutral sandy colors to bright oranges, reds, and purples. In adults, the first abdominal segment is fused with the second. The third, fourth, and fifth segments are each composed of one median (inner) plate and a pair of lateral (outer) plates, although the third segment has accessory plates in two small regions on the left and right surrounded by the second segment, third median plate, and third lateral plates. Males have an equal number of these plates on both sides, but females often have more accessory plates to the left of the median.

== Taxonomy ==
Cryptolithodes sitchensis was described by naturalist Johann Friedrich von Brandt in 1853 from a specimen found near Sitka, Alaska. It is one of the three species of Cryptolithodes, along with C. typicus and C. expansus.
