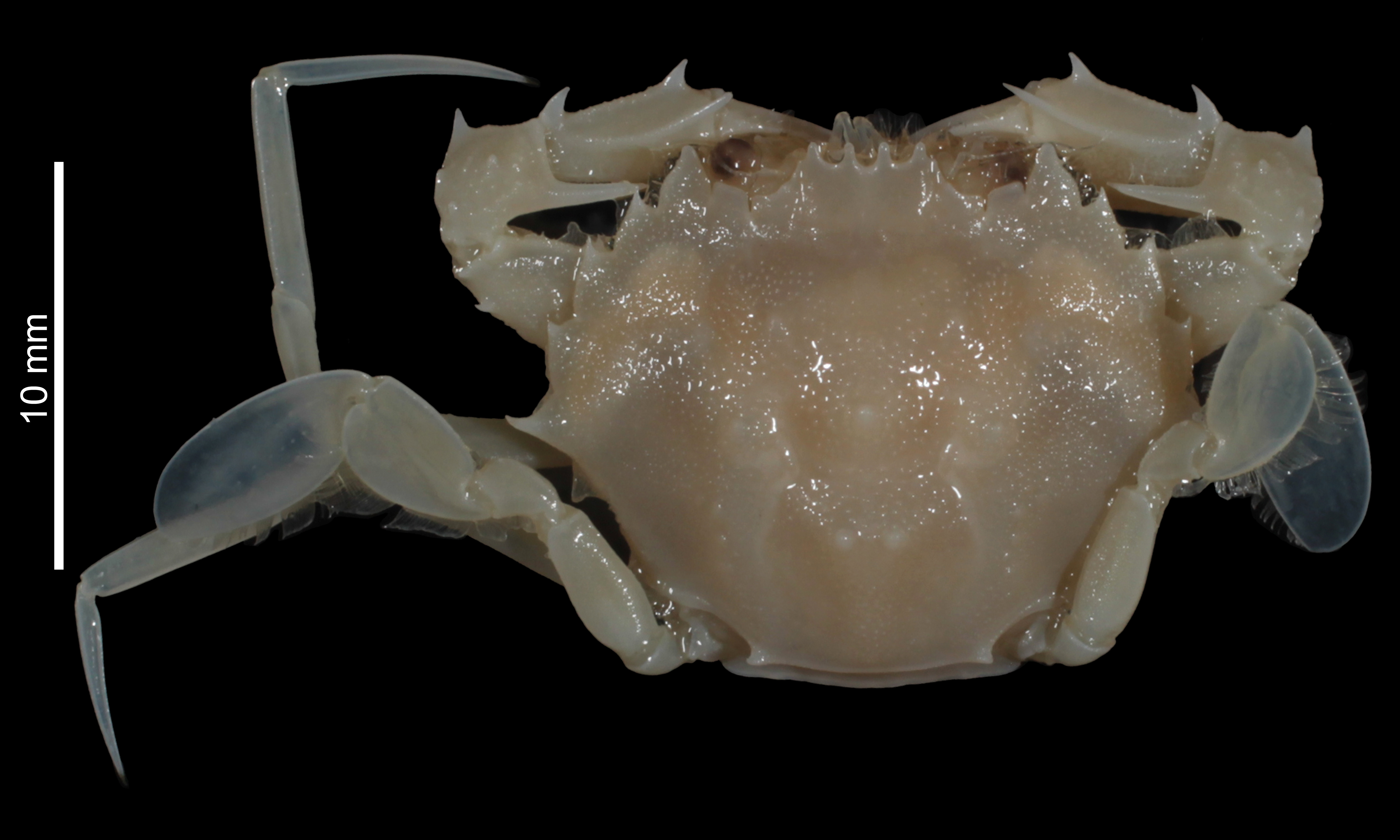
- Parathranites granosus

Scientific classification
- Domain: Eukaryota
- Kingdom: Animalia
- Phylum: Arthropoda
- Class: Malacostraca
- Order: Decapoda
- Suborder: Pleocyemata
- Infraorder: Brachyura
- Family: Polybiidae
- Genus: Parathranites; Miers, 1886

Type species
- Lupocyclus orientalis Miers, 1886

= Parathranites =

Genus of crabs

Parathranites is a genus of crabs. It contains the following species:

- Parathranites granosus Crosnier, 2002
- Parathranites hexagonus Rathbun, 1906
- Parathranites intermedius Crosnier, 2002
- Parathranites orientalis (Miers, 1886)
- Parathranites parahexagonus Crosnier, 2002
- Parathranites ponens Crosnier, 2002
- †Parathranites shibatai Karasawa, 1990
- Parathranites tuberogranosus Crosnier, 2002
- Parathranites tuberosus Crosnier, 2002
