= Porcellionides myrmecophilus =

Scientific classification
- Kingdom: Animalia
- Phylum: Arthropoda
- Class: Malacostraca
- Order: Isopoda
- Suborder: Oniscidea
- Family: Porcellionidae
- Genus: Porcellionides
- Species: P. myrmecophilus

Binomial name
- Porcellionides myrmecophilus (Stein, 1859)

Synonyms
- Porcellio myrmecophilus; Metoponorthus myrmecophilus

Species of woodlouse

Porcellionides myrmecophilus is a woodlouse that can be found on islands such as Crete, Cyprus, Cyclades, Dodecanese, North Aegean, Sardinia, Sicily, and on both Greek and Italian mainlands.

== Subspecies ==
The species has 2 subspecies:

- Porcellionides myrmecophilus graevei (Verhoeff, 1918) – endemic to Sicily
- Porcellionides myrmecophilus myrmecophilus (Stein, 1859) – widespread
