= Porcellionides floria =

Scientific classification
- Kingdom: Animalia
- Phylum: Arthropoda
- Class: Malacostraca
- Order: Isopoda
- Suborder: Oniscidea
- Family: Porcellionidae
- Genus: Porcellionides
- Species: P. floria

Binomial name
- Porcellionides floria Garthwaite & Sassaman, 1985

Species of woodlouse

Porcellionides floria is a species of woodlouse in the family Porcellionidae. It is found in North America and Mexico.
