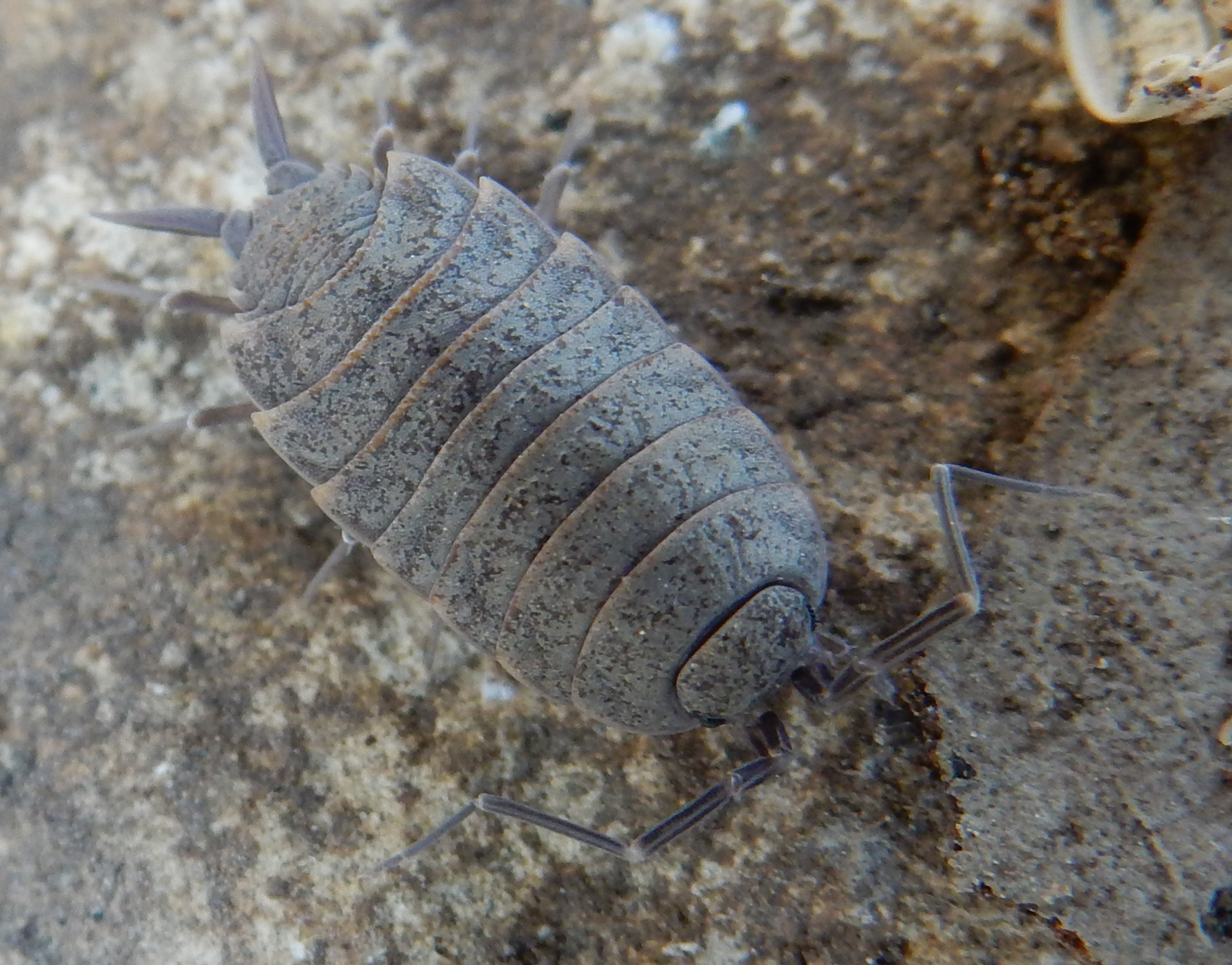
- Porcellionides pruinosus

Scientific classification
- Kingdom: Animalia
- Phylum: Arthropoda
- Class: Malacostraca
- Order: Isopoda
- Suborder: Oniscidea
- Family: Porcellionidae
- Genus: Porcellionides; Miers, 1877

Type species
- Porcellio jelskii Miers, 1877

= Porcellionides =

Genus of woodlice

Porcellionides is a genus of woodlice in the family Porcellionidae. It includes the following species :

- Porcellionides advena (Stuxberg, 1872)
- Porcellionides antalyensis (Verhoeff, 1941)
- Porcellionides approximatus (Budde-Lund, 1885)
- Porcellionides apulicus Arcangeli, 1932
- Porcellionides asifensis (Verhoeff, 1938)
- Porcellionides aternanus (Verhoeff, 1931)
- Porcellionides attarum (Verhoeff, 1941)
- Porcellionides bermudezi Boone, 1934
- Porcellionides brunneus (Brandt, 1833)
- Porcellionides buddelundi (Verhoeff, 1901)
- Porcellionides cavernarum (Vandel, 1958)
- Porcellionides cilicius (Verhoeff, 1918)
- Porcellionides cingendus (Kinahan, 1857)
- Porcellionides coxalis (Budde-Lund, 1885)
- Porcellionides cyprius (Strouhal, 1968)
- Porcellionides delattini (Verhoeff, 1941)
- Porcellionides depressiorum (Verhoeff, 1943)
- Porcellionides divergens (Verhoeff, 1949)
- Porcellionides elegans (Pollo Zorita, 1982)
- Porcellionides fagei Paulian de Félice, 1939
- Porcellionides floria Garthwaite & Sassaman, 1985
- Porcellionides frontosus (Budde-Lund, 1885)
- Porcellionides fuscomarmoratus (Budde-Lund, 1885)
- Porcellionides ghigii (Arcangeli, 1932)
- Porcellionides habanensis Van Name, 1936
- Porcellionides hispidus (Miers, 1877)
- Porcellionides kosswigi (Vandel, 1980)
- Porcellionides lepineyi Paulian de Félice, 1939
- Porcellionides linearis (Budde-Lund, 1885)
- Porcellionides mateui (Vandel, 1954)
- Porcellionides minutissimus (Boone, 1918)
- Porcellionides muelleri Arcangeli, 1926
- Porcellionides myrmecophilus (Stein, 1859)
- Porcellionides myrmicidarum (Verhoeff, 1918)
- Porcellionides nigricans (Brandt, 1833)
- Porcellionides olivarum (Verhoeff, 1928)
- Porcellionides parcus (Budde-Lund, 1885)
- Porcellionides peregrinus (Budde-Lund, 1885)
- Porcellionides pica (Dollfus, 1892)
- Porcellionides politulus (Budde-Lund, 1885)
- Porcellionides pruinosus (Brandt, 1833)
- Porcellionides rectifrons (Budde-Lund, 1885)
- Porcellionides reticulorum (Verhoeff, 1943)
- Porcellionides rogoulti Paulian de Félice, 1939
- Porcellionides rufocinctus (Dollfus, 1892)
- Porcellionides saussurei (Dollfus, 1896)
- Porcellionides sexfasciatus (Budde-Lund, 1885)
- Porcellionides subterraneus (Verhoeff, 1923)
- Porcellionides tingitanus (Budde-Lund, 1885)
- Porcellionides trifasciatus (Dollfus, 1892)
- Porcellionides virgatus (Budde-Lund, 1885)
- Porcellionides viridis (Budde-Lund, 1885)
