= Porcellionides cilicius =

Scientific classification
- Kingdom: Animalia
- Phylum: Arthropoda
- Class: Malacostraca
- Order: Isopoda
- Suborder: Oniscidea
- Family: Porcellionidae
- Genus: Porcellionides
- Species: P. cilicius

Binomial name
- Porcellionides cilicius (Verhoeff, 1901)

Synonyms
- Porcellio cilicius

Species of woodlouse

Porcellionides cilicius is a woodlouse that can be found on Cyprus and in Turkey. The species have one subspecies Porcellionides cilicius antiochensis that can be found only on Cyprus.
