= Edward J. Miers =

British carcinologist

- Born: 1851; Rio de Janeiro, Brazil
- Died: 15 October 1930 (aged 78–79); Burchetts Green, Windsor and Maidenhead, Berkshire
- Citizenship: United Kingdom of Great Britain and Ireland (1851-1922); United Kingdom (1922–1930)
- Education: Summer Fields School; Academy of Lausanne
- Known for: scientific reports from the Challenger expedition (1872–1876); description of 32 new genera and at least 260 new species and subspecies of decapod crustaceans; description of four genera and 72 new species in other orders
- Awards: Fellow of the Zoological Society of London; Fellow of the Linnean Society
- Scientific career
- Fields: Zoology
- Institutions: Natural History Museum, London (1872–1885)

Edward John Miers FZS FLS (1851–15 October 1930) was a British zoologist and curator of the crustacean collection at the Natural History Museum in London. He contributed to the scientific reports from the Challenger expedition of 1872–1876, and described 32 new genera and at least 260 new species and subspecies of decapod crustaceans, along with four genera and 72 new species in other orders.

== Biography ==
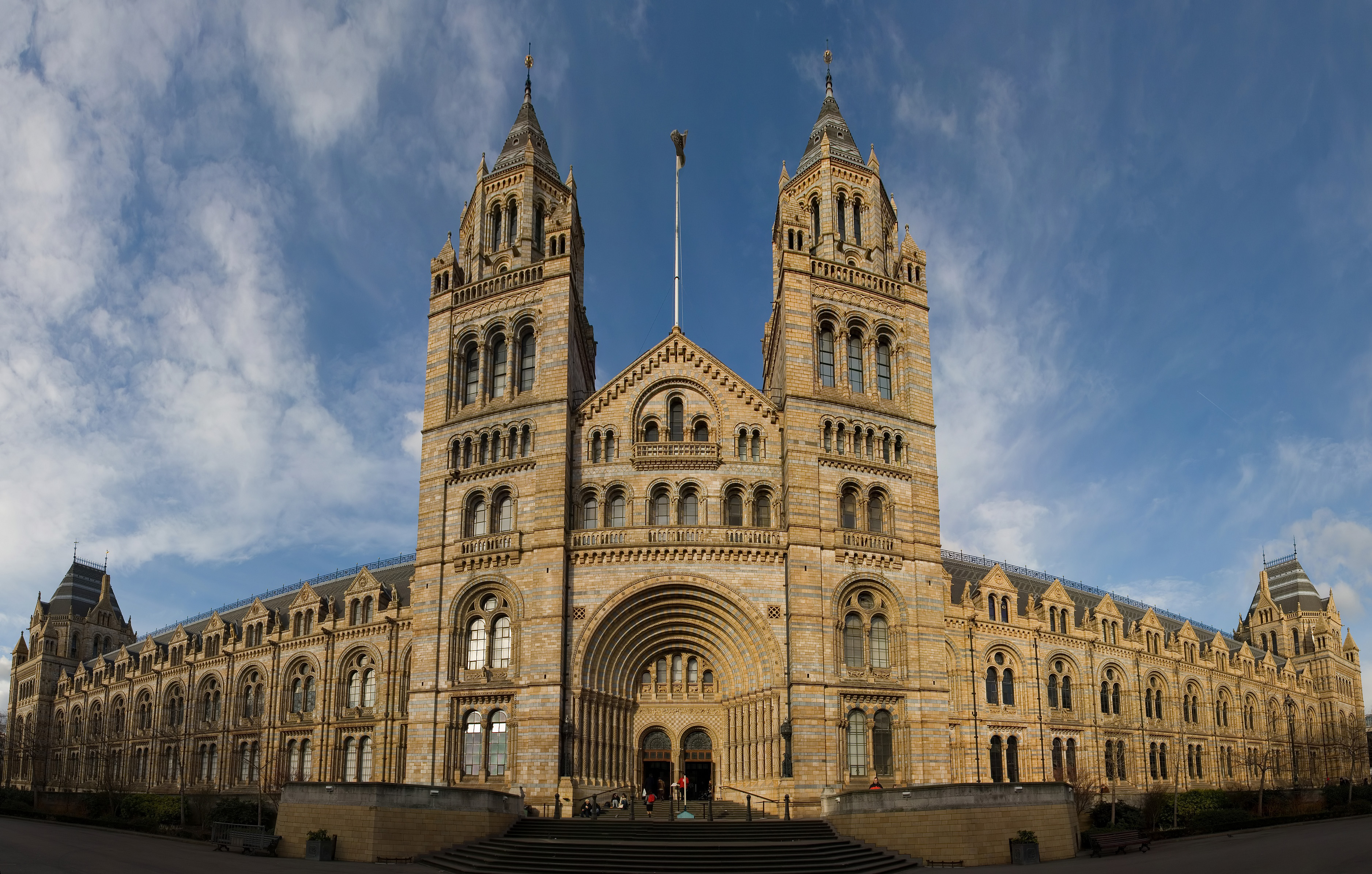
The new Natural History Museum buildings, completed in 1880. Miers spent much of his time arranging for specimens to be moved here from Bloomsbury.

Miers was born in Rio de Janeiro, Brazil in 1851 to the civil engineer Francis Charles Miers and his wife. His grandfather was the engineer and botanist John Miers, and his younger brother (born 1858) was the mineralogist Sir Henry Alexander Miers. Francis Miers retired in 1860 and left South America for England, where Edward was educated at the Summerfield School, Oxford, before being sent for a year to the Academy in Lausanne (which would later become the University of Lausanne).

Miers was appointed curator of the crustacean collections at the Natural History Museum in April or May 1872, taking over from Arthur Gardiner Butler who had been curator of insects, crustaceans, myriapods and arachnids. Miers was charged solely with the Crustacea and "to act as amanuensis to Dr. Gray" (John Edward Gray).

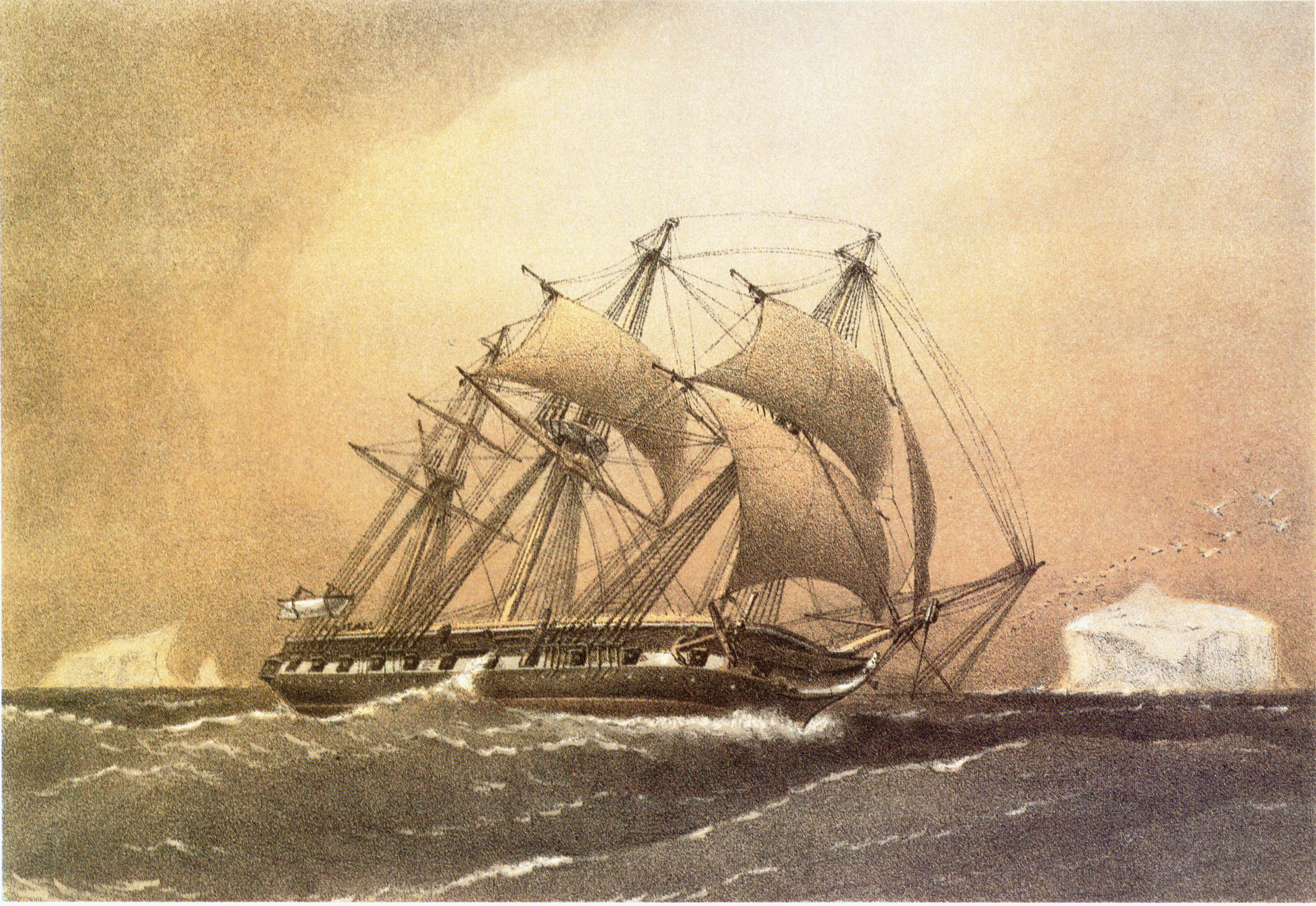
The voyages of H.M.S. Challenger provided the specimens for Miers' magnum opus.

In the 1880s, the Natural History Museum was in the process of moving its collections from the main British Museum site in Bloomsbury to their new building in South Kensington. During that time, Miers published his Catalogue of the stalk- and sessile-eyed Crustacea of New Zealand in 1876 and revised the Plagusiinae, Hippidae, Majidae, Squillidae and Idoteidae in monographs dated 1878–1881, based on the museum's collections. He also reported on the collections donated by the Admiralty from a number of voyages, including the survey of the coast of Japan by H.M.S. Sylvia (1870–1877), an expedition to view the Transit of Venus in Kerguelen and Rodrigues (1874–1875), a survey of the Galápagos Islands by H.M.S. Petrel, Novaya Zemlya by H.M.S. Isbjorn (1879), Baron Hermann-Maltzan's voyage to Gorée in 1881, and the voyages of H.M.S. Alert to Patagonia and the Strait of Magellan (1881–1882). The upheavals at his workplace and the quantity of work to be done may have taken their toll on Miers, and he was "completely prostrated with illness" for three months.

Miers was still working on material from the Alert expedition, when six boxes containing the crabs from the Challenger expedition arrived, sent by John Murray. Describing these crabs would be Miers' largest taxonomic work, one which was published in 1886 as Report on the Brachyura collected by H. M. S. Challenger during the years 1873–1876 in 1886. Miers' honorarium for this work was £63 (60 guineas; equivalent to £8,700 in 2023).

Miers tendered his resignation on 30 October 1885. The curation of the crustacean collection was handed to Jeffrey Bell, but Bell only published one paper on crustaceans, and the task of curation was soon shared with Reginald Innes Pocock. Miers lived to the age of 79, and died on 15 October 1930 at Burchetts Green, near Maidenhead, Berkshire.

== Taxa ==
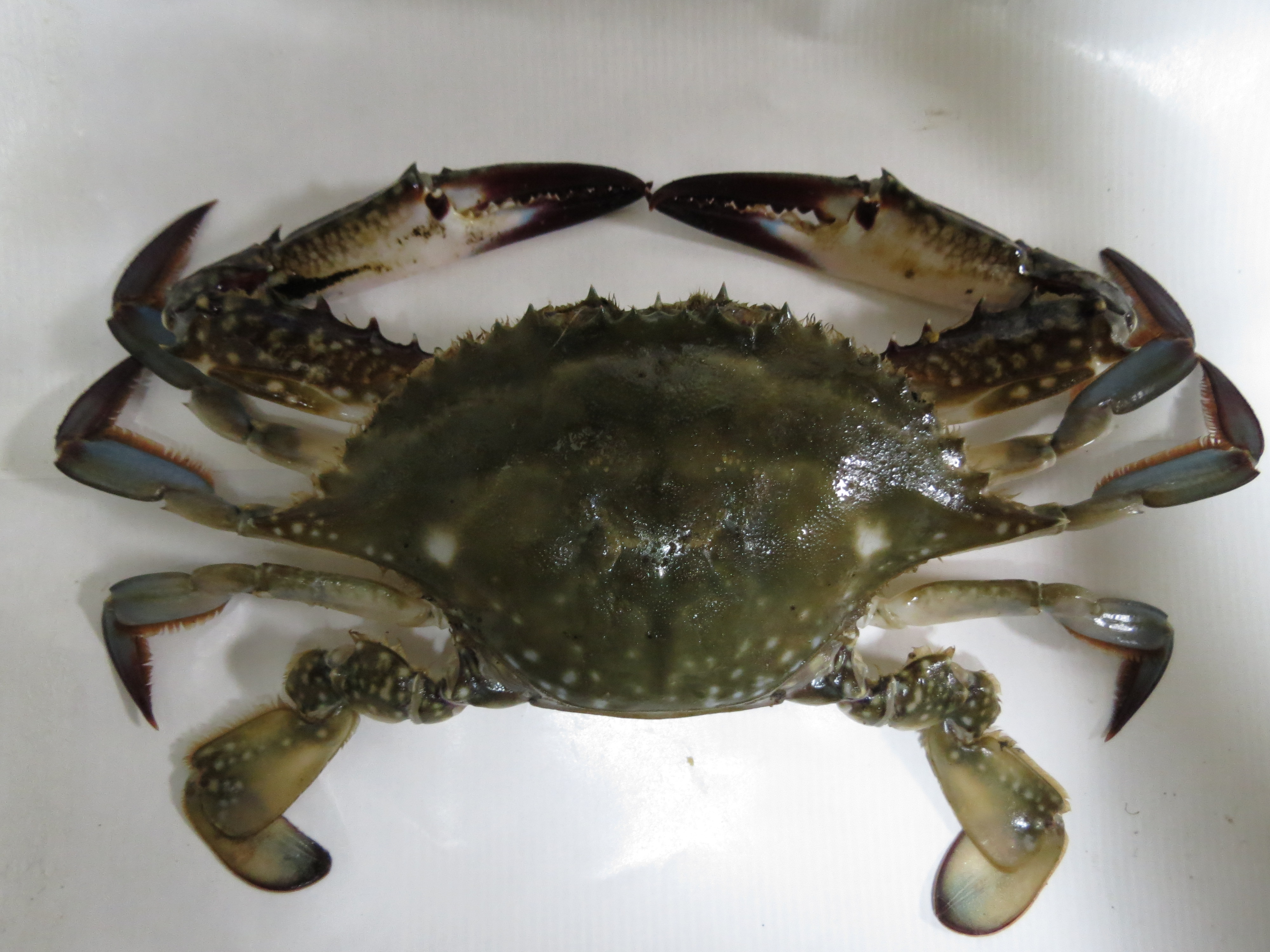
Portunus trituberculatus, the most heavily fished crab in the world, was described in Edward Miers in 1876.

A number of taxa are named in Miers' honour:

- Miersia Kingsley, 1880 – Caridea: Oplophoridae (name suppressed in favour of Acanthephyra)
- Anchistus miersi (De Man, 1888) – Caridea: Palaemonidae
- Metapenaeopsis miersi Holthuis, 1952 – Dendrobranchiata: Penaeidae
- Paraceradocus miersi Pfeffer, 1888 – Amphipoda: Maeridae
- Parthenope miersi (A. Milne-Edwards & Bouvier, 1898) – Brachyura: Parthenopidae
- Clorida miersi Manning 1968 – Stomatopoda: Squillidae
- Pseudidothea miersi (Studer, 1884) – Isopoda: Pseudidotheidae

Taxa named by Miers include:

- Alpheus novaezealandiae – a species of shrimp
- Hexapodidae – a family of crabs
- Hippolyte bifidirostris – a species of shrimp
- Justitia mauritiana – a species of spiny lobster
- Paramoera – a genus of amphipod
- Parathranites – a genus of crabs
- Paratya – a genus of shrimp
- Porcellionides – a genus of woodlouse
- Portunus trituberculatus – gazami crab
- Potamonautes johnstoni – a species of terrestrial crab
- Trapeziidae – a family of crabs
- Upogebia danai – a species of mud lobster
