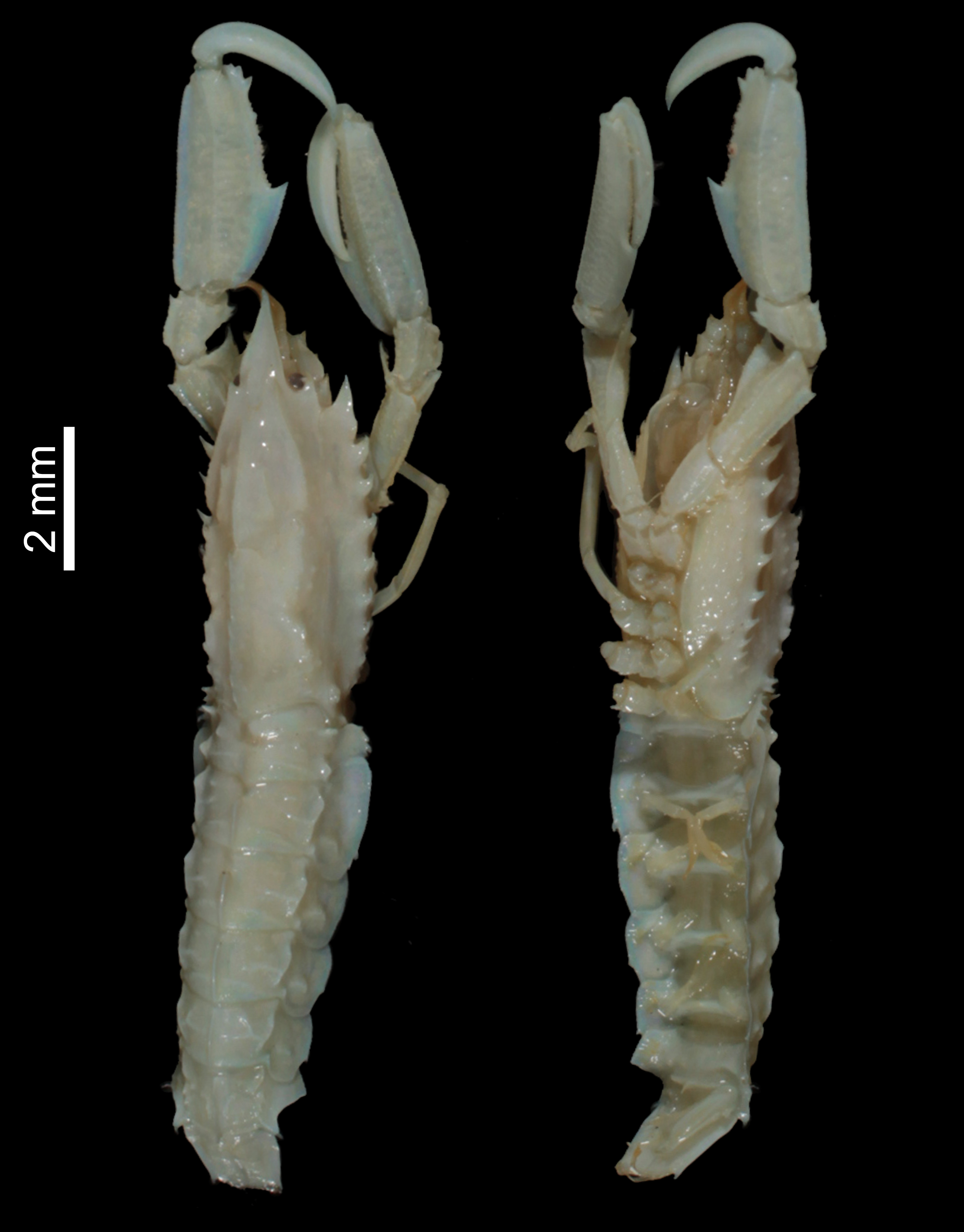
- Naushonia draconis

Scientific classification
- Kingdom: Animalia
- Phylum: Arthropoda
- Clade: Pancrustacea
- Class: Malacostraca
- Order: Decapoda
- Suborder: Pleocyemata
- Infraorder: Gebiidea
- Family: Laomediidae; Borradaile, 1903

Genera
- See text

= Laomediidae =

Family of crustaceans

Laomediidae is a family of mud shrimp crustaceans belonging to the infraorder Gebiidea, within the order Decapoda.

It contains the following genera:

- Jaxea Nardo, 1847
- Laomedia De Haan, 1841
- Naushonia Kingsley, 1897
- †Reschia Schweigert, 2009 - although the placement of Reschia within Laomediidae has been disputed
- Saintlaurentiella Paiva, Tavares & Silva-Neto, 2010
- Strianassa Anker, 2020

The family Axianassidae is sometimes considered to be a junior synonym of Laomediidae. In this case, Laomediidae would also include the following genera:

- Axianassa Schmitt, 1924
- Heteroaxianassa Sakai, 2016
