= Axianassidae =

Scientific classification
- Kingdom: Animalia
- Phylum: Arthropoda
- Clade: Pancrustacea
- Class: Malacostraca
- Order: Decapoda
- Suborder: Pleocyemata
- Infraorder: Gebiidea
- Family: Axianassidae; Schmitt, 1924

Genera
- See text

Family of crustaceans

Axianassidae is a family of mud shrimp crustaceans belonging to the infraorder Gebiidea, within the order Decapoda.

It contains the following genera:

- Axianassa Schmitt, 1924
- Heteroaxianassa Sakai, 2016

However, Axianassidae is sometimes considered to be a junior synonym of Laomediidae.
