= Upogebia africana =

Scientific classification
- Kingdom: Animalia
- Phylum: Arthropoda
- Clade: Pancrustacea
- Class: Malacostraca
- Order: Decapoda
- Suborder: Pleocyemata
- Family: Upogebiidae
- Genus: Upogebia
- Species: U. africana

Binomial name
- Upogebia africana (Ortmann, 1894)

Synonyms
- Gebia africana Ortmann, 1894; Upogebia (Upogebia) africana (Ortmann, 1894)

Species of crustacean

Upogebia africana is a mud shrimp of the family Upogebiidae. It is endemic to the Atlantic and Indian Ocean coasts of southern Africa and occurs between Langebaan in South Africa and Inhambane in Mozambique.
