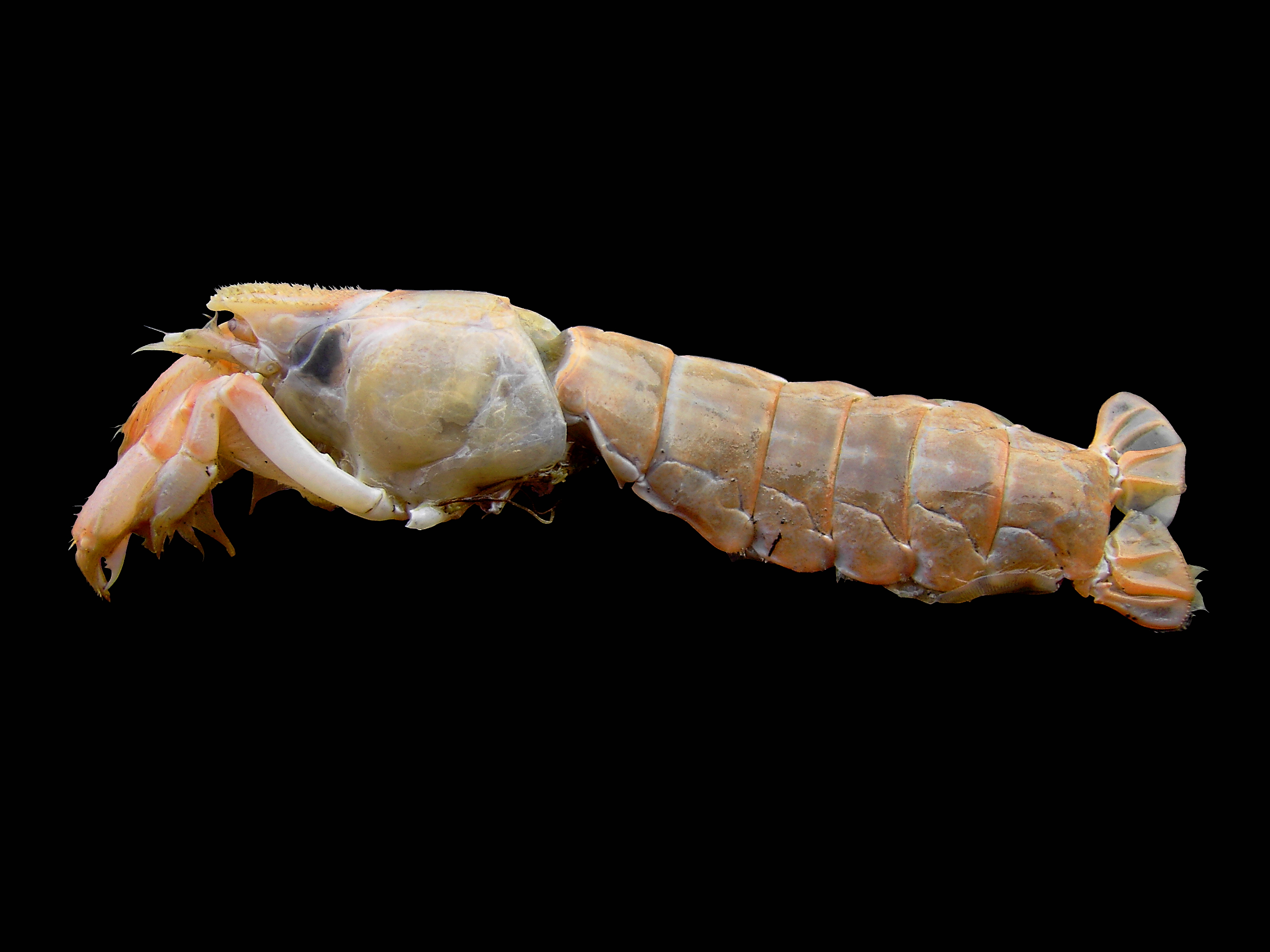
- Upogebia deltaura

Scientific classification
- Kingdom: Animalia
- Phylum: Arthropoda
- Clade: Pancrustacea
- Class: Malacostraca
- Order: Decapoda
- Suborder: Pleocyemata
- Clade: Reptantia
- Infraorder: Gebiidea de Saint Laurent, 1979

Families
- Axianassidae; Laomediidae; Thalassinidae; Upogebiidae

= Gebiidea =

Infraorder of crustaceans

Gebiidea is an infraorder of decapod crustaceans, consisting of mud lobsters and mud shrimp.

Gebiidea and Axiidea were previously considered members of the former infraorder Thalassinidea. These infraorders have converged ecologically and morphologically as burrowing forms. Based on molecular evidence as of 2009, it is now widely believed that these two infraorders represent two distinct lineages separate from one another. Despite this change, some of the literature and research surrounding these infraorders still refers to the Axiidea and Gebiidea in combination as "thalassinidean" for the sake of clarity and reference. This division based on molecular evidence is consistent with the groupings proposed by Robert Gurney in 1938 based on larval developmental stages.

The infraorder Gebiidea belongs to the clade Reptantia, which consists of the walking/crawling decapods (lobsters and crabs). The cladogram below shows Gebiidea's placement within the larger order Decapoda, from analysis by Wolfe et al., 2019.

- Decapoda
  - - Dendrobranchiata (prawns)
  - Pleocyemata
    - - Stenopodidea (boxer shrimp)
      - - Procarididea
        - Caridea ("true" shrimp)
    - Reptantia (crawling / walking decapods)
      - - Achelata (spiny lobsters and slipper lobsters)
        - - Polychelida (benthic crustaceans)
          - Glypheidea (glypheoid lobsters)
          - Astacidea (lobsters and crayfish)
      - - Axiidea (mud shrimp, ghost shrimp, and burrowing shrimp)
        - - Gebiidea (mud lobsters and mud shrimp)
          - - Anomura (hermit crabs and allies)
            - Brachyura ("true" crabs)

Gebiidea comprises the following families:

- Axianassidae Schmitt, 1924
- Laomediidae Borradaile, 1903
- Thalassinidae Latreille, 1831
- Upogebiidae Borradaile, 1903

However, Axianassidae is sometimes considered to be a junior synonym of Laomediidae.
