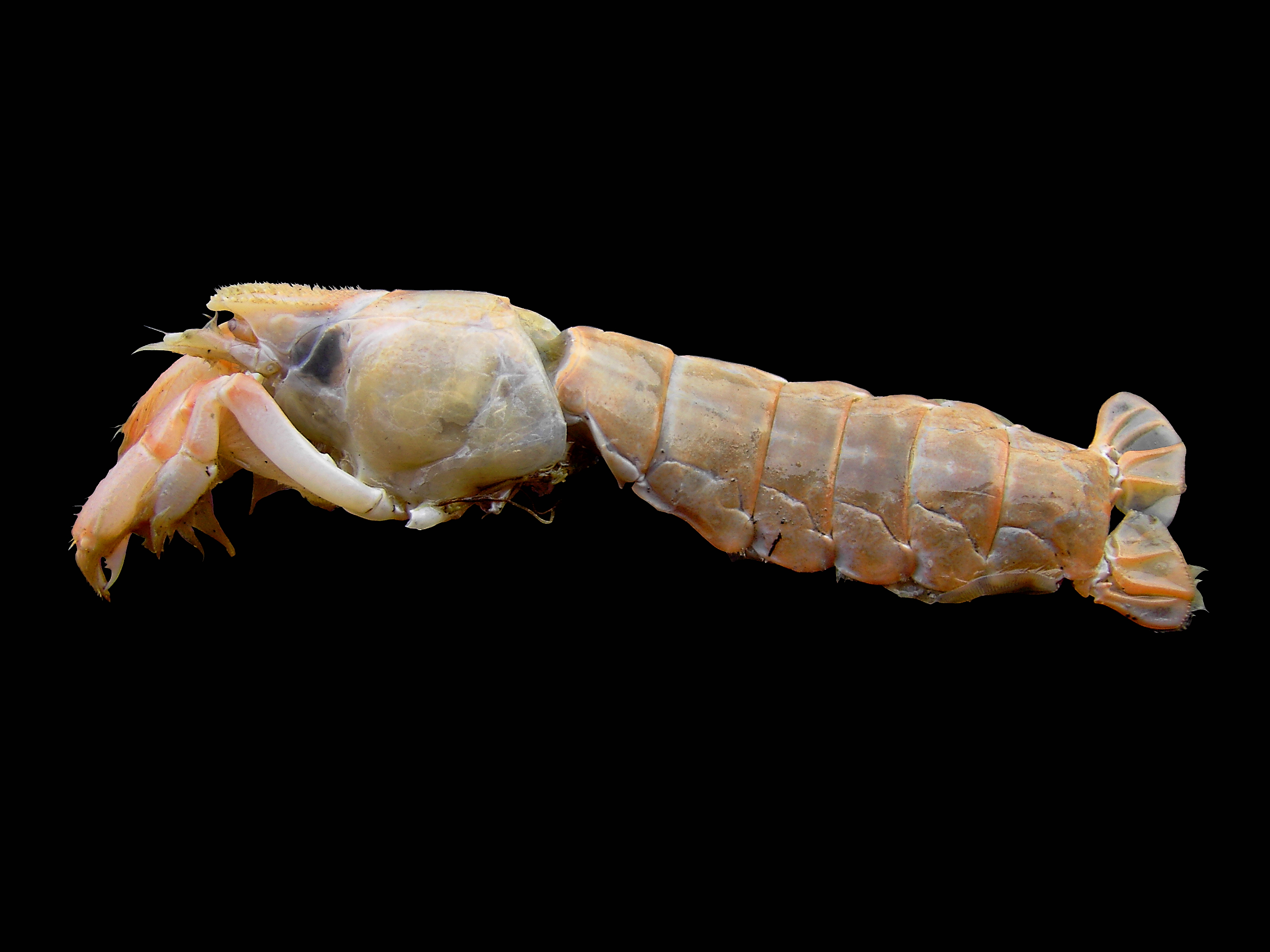
- Upogebia deltaura

Scientific classification
- Kingdom: Animalia
- Phylum: Arthropoda
- Clade: Pancrustacea
- Class: Malacostraca
- Order: Decapoda
- Suborder: Pleocyemata
- Infraorder: Gebiidea
- Family: Upogebiidae; Borradaile, 1903

Genera
- See text

= Upogebiidae =

Family of crustaceans

Upogebiidae is a family of mud shrimp crustaceans belonging to the infraorder Gebiidea, within the order Decapoda. They are infauna, living their entire adult lives in seafloor burrows. Over 100 species have been identified, with different species often highly specialized for different types of substrate, even including sea sponges or coral. They are filter feeders, although some species also deposit feed.

Upogebiidae contains the following genera:

- Acutigebia Sakai, 1982
- Aethogebia A. B. Williams, 1993
- Arabigebicula Sakai, 2006
- Austinogebia Ngoc-Ho, 2001
- Gebiacantha Ngoc-Ho, 1989
- Gebicula Alcock, 1901
- Mantisgebia Sakai, 2006
- Neogebicula Sakai, 1982
- Pomatogebia Williams & Ngoc-Ho, 1990
- Tuerkayogebia Sakai, 1982
- Upogebia Leach, 1814
- Wolffogebia Sakai, 1982
