= C. princeps =

C. princeps may refer to:

- Cervimunida princeps, a squat lobster species in the genus Cervimunida
- Coccophagus princeps, a wasp species in the genus Coccophagus
- Conus princeps, a sea snail species
- Cordulegaster princeps, a dragonfly species endemic to Morocco
- Cottus princeps, the Klamath Lake sculpin, a fish species endemic to the United States
