= Langostino =

Various types of seafood

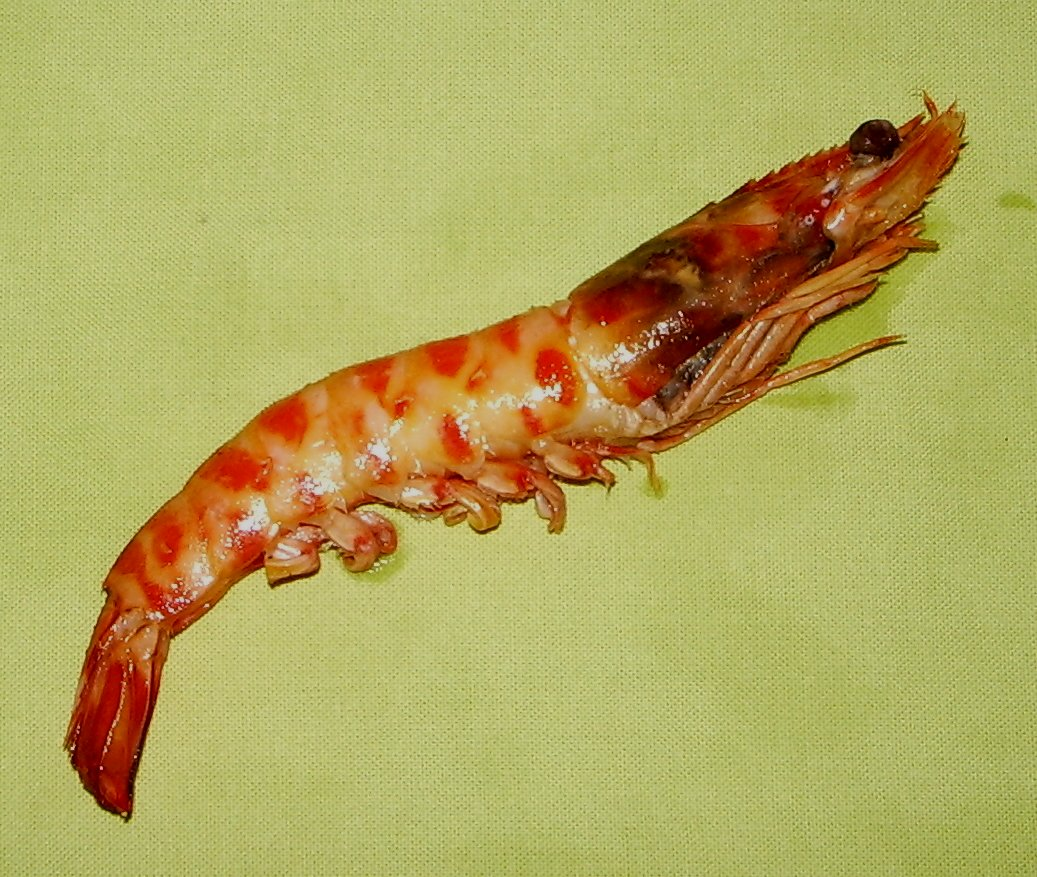
A grilled langostino prawn

Langostino is a word of Spanish origin commonly applied to various types of crustacean. “Langostino” is the Spanish diminutive of langosta (spiny lobster), which comes from the Latin for locust.

In the United States, it is commonly used in the restaurant trade to refer to the meat of squat lobsters, which are not true lobsters but are more closely related to porcelain and hermit crabs. Also, langostinos are sometimes confused with Norway lobster, also called langoustines. In the US, the Food and Drug Administration allows "langostino" to be used as a market name for three species of squat lobster in the family Galatheidae: Cervimunida johni, Munida gregaria, and Pleuroncodes monodon.

In Spain and Venezuela, it means some species of prawns. In Cuba and other Spanish-speaking Caribbean islands, the name langostino is also used to refer to crayfish, which are freshwater species. In Argentina the name is used to refer to Pleoticus muelleri, a kind of shrimp, while in Chile and Peru it refers to Pleuroncodes monodon, a squat lobster.

== Restaurant labeling controversies ==
In March 2006, Long John Silver's garnered controversy by offering a dish they called "Buttered Lobster Bites" without making it clear in its advertising that these were made from "langostino lobster." The Federal Trade Commission launched an investigation into deceptive advertising practices by the chain, because Food and Drug Administration regulations require that anyone marketing langostino as lobster must place the qualifier "langostino" adjacent to the word "lobster," and Long John Silver's not only failed to do this, but ran a television commercial making use of an American lobster in a manner that the commission concluded was contributing to the misperception that the product was American lobster.

Upon being contacted by the commission, Long John Silver's promptly terminated the television commercial campaigns, revised its website, and committed both to prominently placing the word "langostino" adjacent to the term "lobster" in all future advertising, and to revising its existing in-store materials accordingly within eight weeks, and on June 24, 2009, the commission wrote to the chain to inform them that they had no intention of taking further action at that time.

Rubio's Restaurants, Inc., settled a 2006 class-action lawsuit for selling "lobster burritos" and "lobster tacos" that were in fact made with squat lobster. The company agreed to change the name to "langostino lobster".

In February 2016, Red Lobster was revealed to have been using a mix of lobster and less-expensive langostino for its lobster bisque.

A 2016 study of American restaurants tested the “lobster” served and found that many were in fact langostino or seafood that were not spiny lobsters.
