= Pseudorhabdosynochus amplidiscatus =

Scientific classification
- Kingdom: Animalia
- Phylum: Platyhelminthes
- Class: Monogenea
- Order: Dactylogyridea
- Family: Diplectanidae
- Genus: Pseudorhabdosynochus
- Species: P. amplidiscatus

Binomial name
- Pseudorhabdosynochus amplidiscatus (Bravo-Hollis, 1954) Kritsky & Beverley-Burton, 1986

Synonyms
- Diplectanum amplidiscatum Bravo-Hollis, 1954; Cycloplectanum americanum (Bravo-Hollis, 1954) Oliver, 1968 (pro parte); Pseudorhabdosynochus amplidiscatum

Species of flatworm

Pseudorhabdosynochus amplidiscatus is a diplectanid monogenean parasitic on the gills of groupers. It was described as Diplectanum amplidiscatum by Bravo-Hollis in 1954 and transferred to the genus Pseudorhabdosynochus by Kritsky and Beverley-Burton in 1986.

== Description ==
Pseudorhabdosynochus amplidiscatus is a small monogenean. The species has the general characteristics of other species of Pseudorhabdosynochus, with a flat body and a posterior haptor, which is the organ by which the monogenean attaches itself to the gill of is host. The haptor bears two squamodiscs, one ventral and one dorsal. The sclerotized male copulatory organ, or "quadriloculate organ", has the shape of a bean with four internal chambers, as in other species of Pseudorhabdosynochus. The vagina includes a sclerotized part, which is a complex structure.

The species was redescribed by Oliver in 1987 and by Yang, Gibson and Zeng in 2005.

== Hosts and localities ==
The spotted sand bass (Paralabrax maculatofasciatus) is the type-host of Pseudorhabdosynochus amplidiscatus. The species has been described from fish caught off the Pacific coast of Mexico. It has also been recorded from the groupers Epinephelus labriformis and Epinephelus analogus from the Pacific coast of Mexico and Panama.
