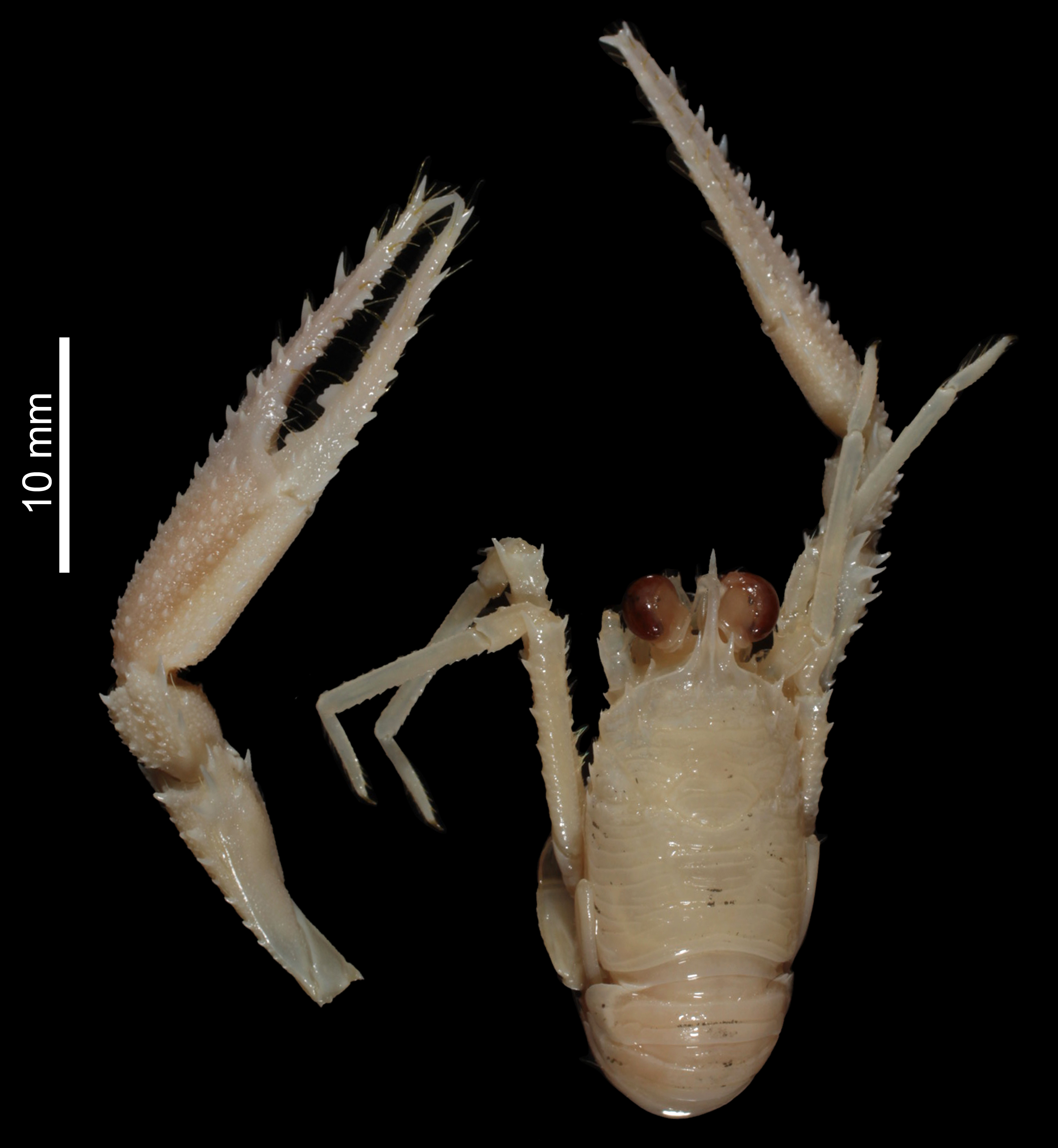

Scientific classification
- Kingdom: Animalia
- Phylum: Arthropoda
- Class: Malacostraca
- Order: Decapoda
- Suborder: Pleocyemata
- Infraorder: Anomura
- Family: Munididae
- Genus: Babamunida
- Species: B. javieri

Binomial name
- Babamunida javieri (Macpherson, 1994)

Synonyms
- Munida javieri Macpherson, 1994

= Babamunida javieri =

Species of crustacean

Babamunida javieri is a species of squat lobster in the family Munididae. It is found off of New Caledonia, the Chesterfield Islands, and the Matthew and Hunter Islands, at depths between about 280 and 440 metres (920 and 1,440 ft).
