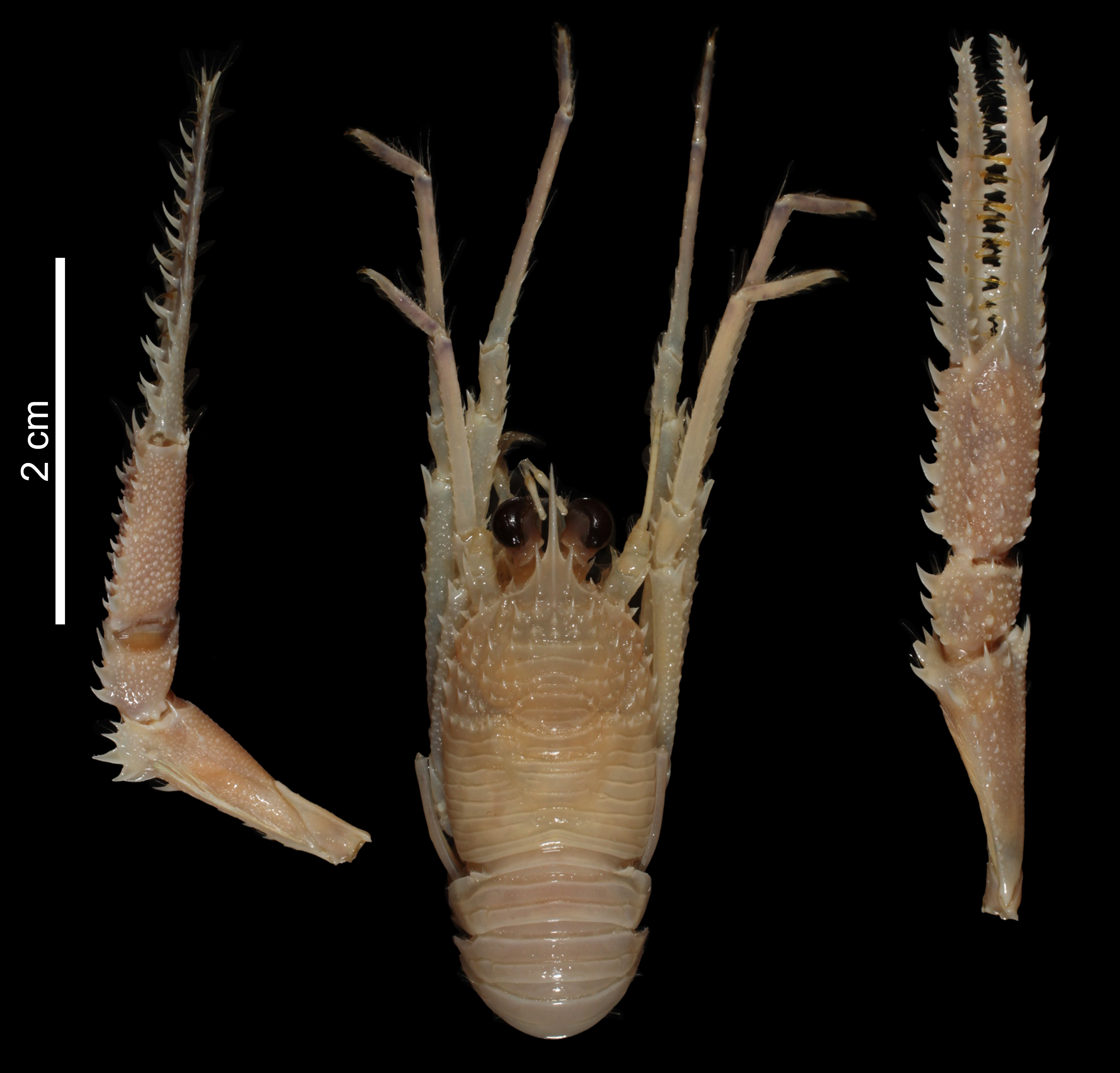

Scientific classification
- Kingdom: Animalia
- Phylum: Arthropoda
- Class: Malacostraca
- Order: Decapoda
- Suborder: Pleocyemata
- Infraorder: Anomura
- Family: Munididae
- Genus: Babamunida
- Species: B. hystrix

Binomial name
- Babamunida hystrix (Macpherson & de Saint Laurent, 1991)

Synonyms
- Munida hystrix Macpherson & de Saint Laurent, 1991

= Babamunida hystrix =

Species of crustacean

Babamunida hystrix is a species of squat lobster in the family Munididae. It is found off of French Polynesia and the Tuamotu Islands, at depths between about 100 and 290 metres (330 and 950 ft).
