= Babamunida debrae =

Scientific classification
- Kingdom: Animalia
- Phylum: Arthropoda
- Clade: Pancrustacea
- Class: Malacostraca
- Order: Decapoda
- Suborder: Pleocyemata
- Infraorder: Anomura
- Family: Munididae
- Genus: Babamunida
- Species: B. debrae

Binomial name
- Babamunida debrae Baba, 2011

Species of crustacean

Babamunida debrae, Debra's squat lobster, is a species of squat lobster in the family Munididae. It was discovered on the west coast of Hawaii, usually sheltering in holes of lava rocks. It is named after Debra Newbery, who discovered the species alongside Dennis McCrea. It was discovered on the west coast of Hawaii, usually sheltering in holes of lava rocks.

== Distribution ==
Babamunida debrae is considered endemic to the Hawaiian islands, in comparison to other munidopsid species, which are known to have a large distribution. Debra's squat lobster has been found in shallow waters, between 50–85 ft (15–26 m). It has also been spotted in the French Frigate Shoals.

== Description ==
The species is bright orange in coloration, with big eyes and white stripes on the claws. Its carapace width is observed to be around 5 mm (0.20 in).
