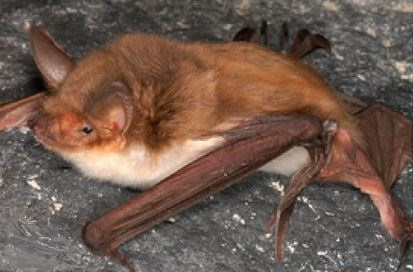

Conservation status
- Vulnerable (IUCN 3.1)

Scientific classification
- Kingdom: Animalia
- Phylum: Chordata
- Class: Mammalia
- Order: Chiroptera
- Family: Vespertilionidae
- Genus: Myotis
- Species: M. vivesi

Binomial name
- Myotis vivesi Ménégaux, 1901
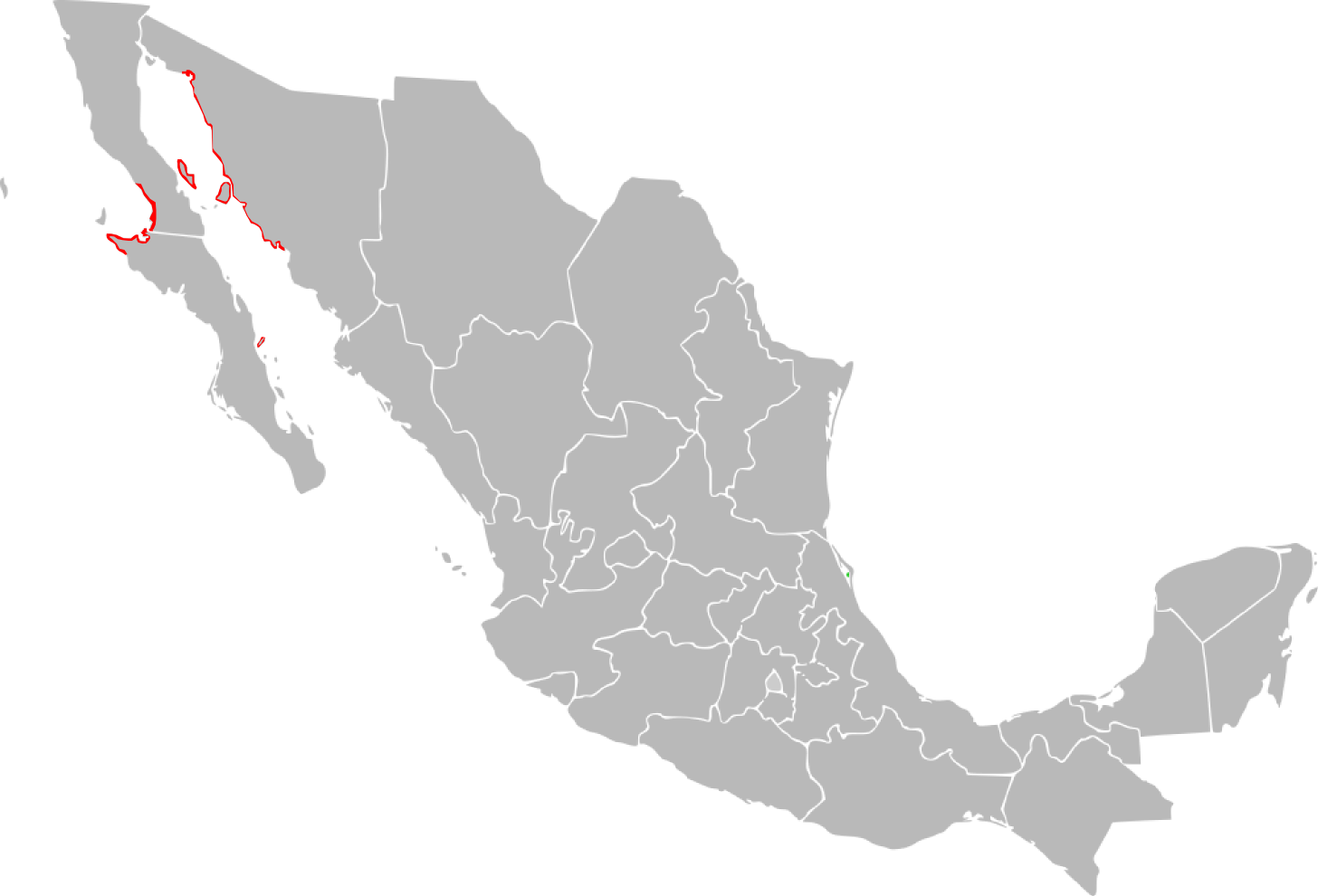

= Myotis vivesi =

Species of bat

Myotis vivesi, the fish-eating bat or fish-eating myotis, is a species of bat that lives around the Gulf of California, and feeds on fish and crustaceans. It is the largest species of the genus Myotis in the Americas, and has exceptionally large feet, which it uses in hunting. It was described in 1901 by Auguste Ménégaux. It was previously considered the only member of the Myotis subgenus Pizonyx, but Pizonyx is now considered to contain all American Myotis species, along with two Eurasian ones.

== Description ==
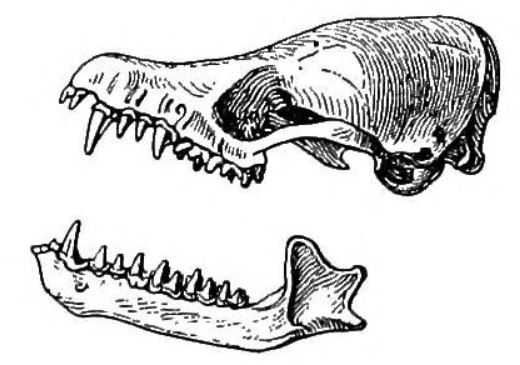
Myotis vivesi skull

Myotis vivesi is the largest species in the genus Myotis in the Americas, and is similar in size to the Eurasian Myotis myotis (greater mouse-eared bat). The skull averages 23 millimetres (0.91 in) in length. The second largest Myotis species in the New World, Myotis velifer, has a skull 17.6 mm (0.69 in) long, and feet 8 mm (0.31 in) long; M. vivesi has greatly elongated hind feet, which average 23 mm (0.91 in) long.

In common with other fish-eating bats, Myotis vivesi has long, efficient wings, with high aspect ratio and low wing loading, and large feet with sharp claws. The uropatagium (the wing surface between the hind legs) bears a fringe of silky hairs of unknown function; the uropatagium itself is used in hunting.

The fur is around 8 mm (0.31 in) long, and varies in colour from fawn to brown, with the base of each hair being dark grey. In common with other piscivorous species of Myotis, the underside of M. vivesi is pale.

== Distribution ==
Myotis vivesi is found along the coast of the Gulf of California in the Mexican states of Sonora, Baja California and Baja California Sur, mostly on small islands. A small population exists on the Pacific coast of the Baja California peninsula, between Isla Encantada and Punta Coyote. Since it lives on small islands, the range of M. vivesi is naturally fragmented, but data from microsatellites and the mtDNA control region indicate that there is no isolation by distance in the species.

== Ecology and behaviour ==
Myotis vivesi feeds chiefly on marine fish or crustaceans, including the squat lobster Pleuroncodes planipes. Only one other bat species, Noctilio leporinus, hunts in marine waters. The guano produced by M. vivesi is red if it has eaten crustaceans, and black if it has eaten fish; green guano and brown guano result from feeding on algae and insects, respectively. As well as fish and crustaceans, M. vivesi also feeds occasionally on aerial insects. M. vivesi can cover large distances when hunting; in 1970, scientists saw "a group of about 400 M. vivesi around a boat at least 7 km [4.3 miles] from the shore". M. vivesi inhabits an arid environment and has evolved the ability to concentrate its urine; this allows it to survive by drinking seawater.

M. vivesi prefers to roost either in caves or under rocks revealed by landslides. They sometimes share their roosts with least petrels (Halocyptena microsoma) and black petrels (Oceanodroma melania). On many islands in the Gulf of California where these petrels nest, the western whiptail is a known predator of their eggs and chicks, and the petrels generally show only fearful responses towards the lizards and are capable of doing little to defend their offspring. However M. vivesi that share roosts with these petrels swiftly react by biting and flapping when the lizards are detected, effectively warding the reptiles off. This may be an example of a symbiotic relationship in which the bats help defend the young of nesting petrels, increasing the chances of survival for petrel chicks.

== Taxonomy and evolution ==
Myotis vivesi was first described by Auguste Ménégaux in 1901. The species was moved to a new genus, Pizonyx by Gerrit Smith Miller Jr. in 1906, but that taxon is now usually included in Myotis. Ménégaux gave no indication of the etymology of the specific name vivesi; it may either refer to a person called Vives, or derive from the Latin verb vivere, "to live". If Vives was a person, he was not the collector of the specimens, that being recorded as Léon Diguet. No subspecies of M. vivesi have been recognised.

The closest relatives of M. vivesi are other New World species of Myotis which are not adapted to piscivory, rather than the other piscivorous bats in the genus. This indicates that the adaptations to catching fish in M. vivesi and other species are the result of convergent evolution. No fossils attributable to M. vivesi have been discovered. A fossil species of Pizonyx, Pizonyx wheeleri, was named by Walter Dalquest and Daniel Patrick in 1993 from the Miocene of Texas, but according to a 1993 review by Nicholas Czaplewski, this species instead belongs to the genus Antrozous and may not even be distinct from the living species Antrozous pallidus.
