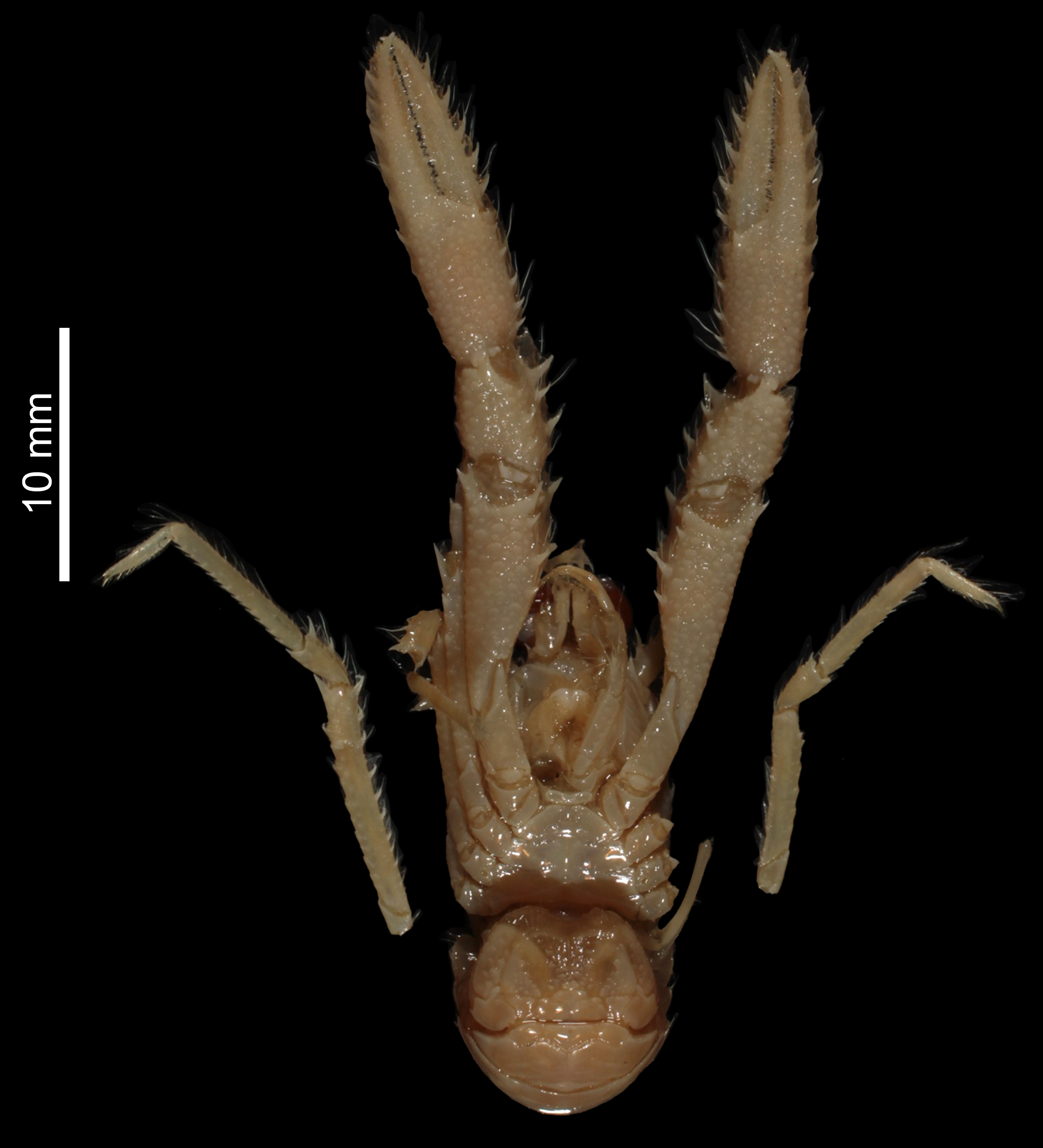

Scientific classification
- Kingdom: Animalia
- Phylum: Arthropoda
- Class: Malacostraca
- Order: Decapoda
- Suborder: Pleocyemata
- Infraorder: Anomura
- Family: Munididae
- Genus: Babamunida
- Species: B. plexaura

Binomial name
- Babamunida plexaura (Macpherson & de Saint Laurent, 1991)

Synonyms
- Munida plexaura Macpherson & de Saint Laurent, 1991

= Babamunida plexaura =

Species of crustacean

Babamunida plexaura is a species of squat lobster in the family Munididae. It is found off of Tuamotus and the Tubuai Islands, at depths between about 350 and 400 metres (1,150 and 1,310 ft).
