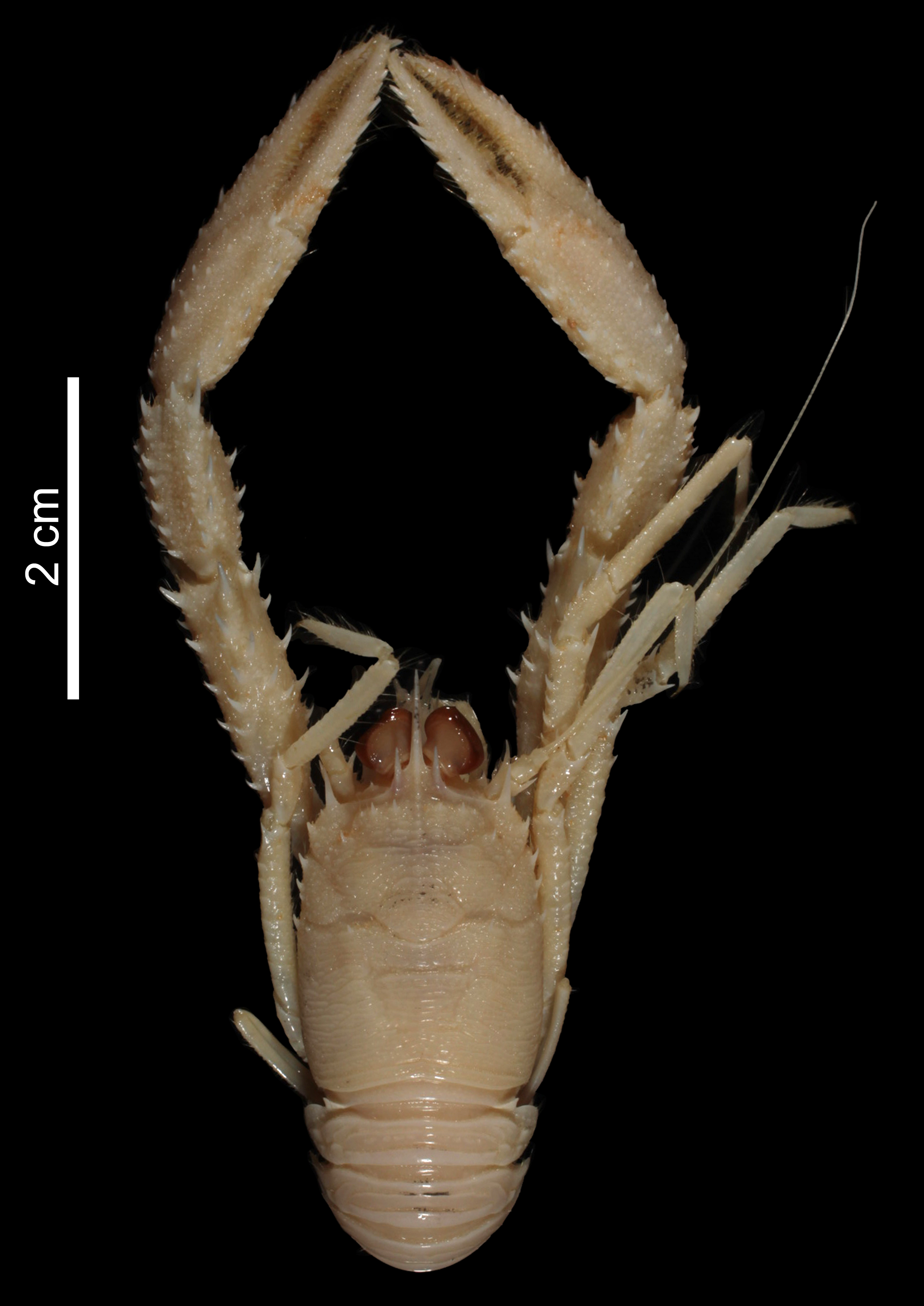
- Holotype of Babamunida callista

Scientific classification
- Kingdom: Animalia
- Phylum: Arthropoda
- Class: Malacostraca
- Order: Decapoda
- Suborder: Pleocyemata
- Infraorder: Anomura
- Family: Munididae
- Genus: Babamunida
- Species: B. callista

Binomial name
- Babamunida callista (Macpherson, 1994)

Synonyms
- Munida callista Macpherson, 1994

= Babamunida callista =

Species of crustacean

Babamunida callista is a species of squat lobster in the family Munididae. It is found off of New Caledonia and Chesterfield Islands, at depths between 400 and 590 metres (1,310 and 1,940 ft).
