= Pinch bug =

Pinch bug, pinchbug, or pincher bug may refer to:

- Stag beetles, insects belonging to the family Lucanidae
- Earwigs, insects belonging to the order Dermaptera
- Members of the crab family Chirostylidae, which together with families Galatheidae and Kiwaidae are also commonly known as squat lobsters
- Crayfish, freshwater crustaceans belonging to the superfamilies Astacoidea and Parastacoidea
