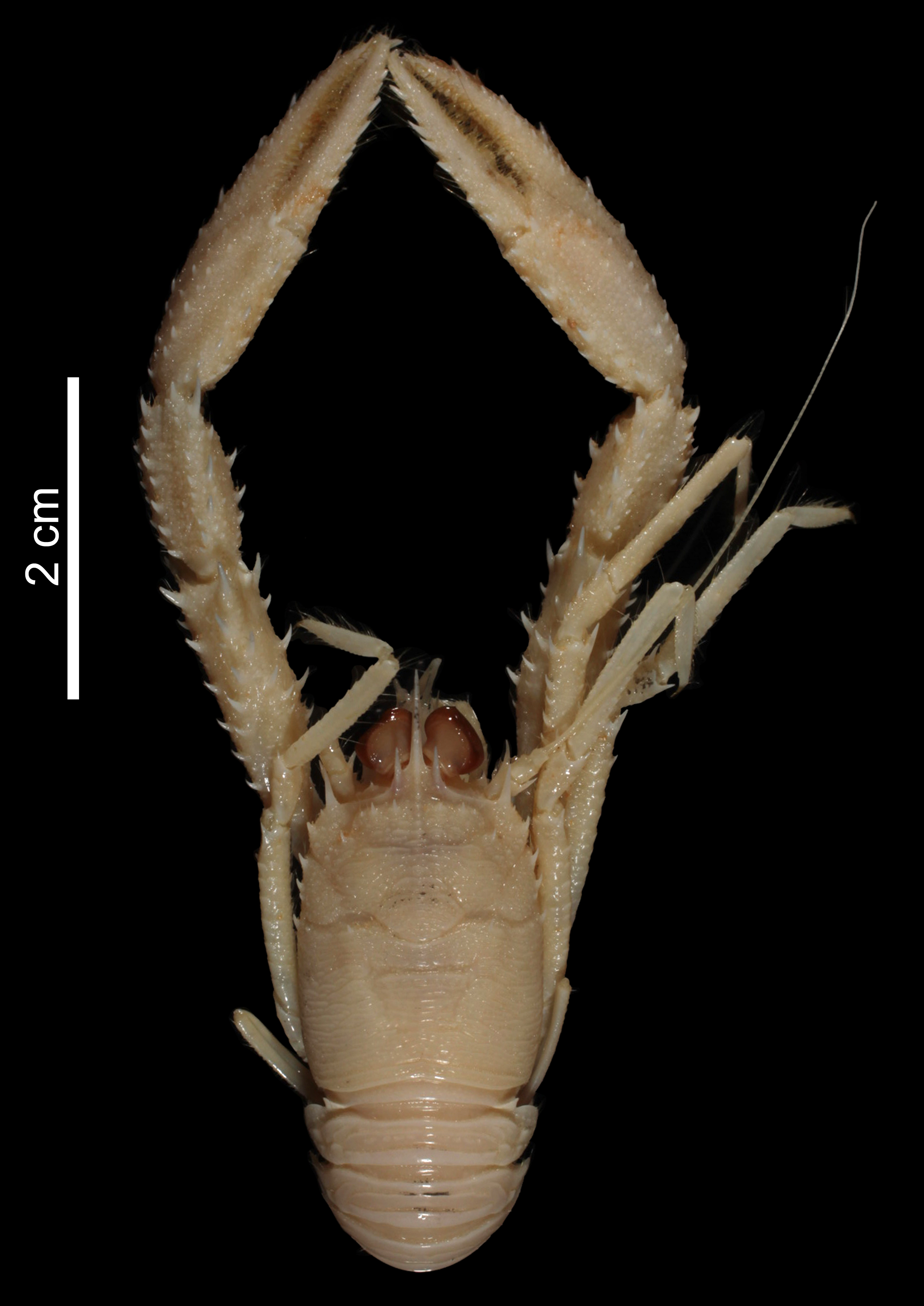
- Babamunida callista

Scientific classification
- Kingdom: Animalia
- Phylum: Arthropoda
- Class: Malacostraca
- Order: Decapoda
- Suborder: Pleocyemata
- Infraorder: Anomura
- Family: Munididae
- Genus: Babamunida; Cabezas, Macpherson & Machordom, 2008

Type species
- Munida callista Macpherson, 1994

= Babamunida =

Genus of crustaceans

Babamunida is a genus of squat lobsters in the family Munididae. The genus occurs in the Atlantic, Indian, and Pacific Oceans, with the greatest diversity in the Pacific (8 species).

== Species ==
There are twelve recognized species:

- Babamunida bellula Macpherson, Rodriguez-Flores & Machordom, 2020
- Babamunida brucei (Baba, 1974)
- Babamunida callista (Macpherson, 1994)
- Babamunida coltroi (Melo-Filho & Melo, 2006)
- Babamunida debrae Baba, 2011
- Babamunida forceps (A. Milne Edwards, 1880)
- Babamunida hystrix (Macpherson & de Saint Laurent, 1991)
- Babamunida javieri (Macpherson, 1994)
- Babamunida kanaloa Schnabel, Martin & Moffitt, 2009
- Babamunida obesa (Faxon, 1893)
- Babamunida plexaura (Macpherson & de Saint Laurent, 1991)
- Babamunida robusta (A. Milne Edwards, 1880)

Babamunida coltroi and Babamunida robusta are included here pending a more careful study.
