= Rubio's Coastal Grill =

Mexican-American fast casual restaurant chain

Rubio's Restaurants, Inc.

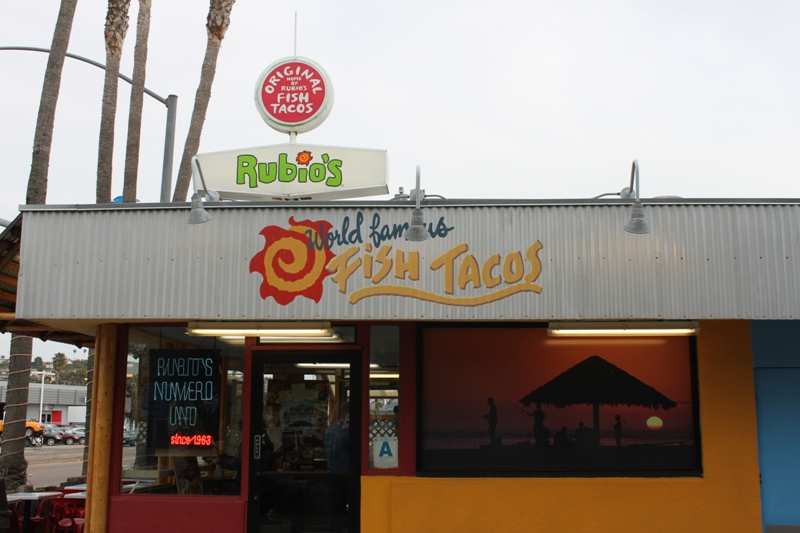
- Original Rubio's on Mission Bay Drive in San Diego, California
- Trade name: Rubio's Coastal Grill
- Type: Private
- Industry: Restaurants
- Founded: San Diego, California (1983; 43 years ago)
- Founder: Ralph Rubio
- Headquarters: Carlsbad, California
- Number of locations: 82 (as of January 2025)
- Area served: California; Nevada; Arizona
- Key people: Ralph Rubio, founder
- Products: Tacos, burritos, quesadillas, salads
- Revenue: 188.9 million USD (2009)
- Owner: Mill Road Capital (2010-2024); TREW Capital Management (2024)
- Number of employees: 4,000 (2013)
- Website: www.rubios.com

Rubio's Coastal Grill, formerly known as Rubio's Fresh Mexican Grill and Rubio's Baja Grill, is an American fast casual "Fresh Mex" or "New Mex" restaurant chain specializing in Mexican food, with an emphasis on fish tacos. As of January 2025, Rubio's operates, licenses, or franchises 82 restaurants, with 17 restaurants in Arizona, 60 in Southern California, and 5 in Nevada. It previously had locations in northern California, Colorado, Florida and Utah. The chain announced store closings and a bankruptcy filing the same year with plans to sell itself to lenders. It is headquartered in Carlsbad, California. The company had as many as 196 restaurants through the United States by the end of 2016.

== History ==
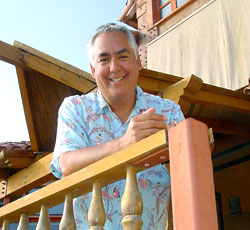
Ralph Rubio

According to founder Ralph Rubio, he and some friends from San Diego State University were on spring break in San Felipe, Baja California, when he first encountered fish tacos at a local stand, and was inspired to open a restaurant serving them in his hometown, San Diego. Since then, the popularity of fish tacos has spread throughout California, although they remain uncommon elsewhere. Rubio's standard fish tacos are made from Alaskan pollock, which is battered, fried, and served in a corn tortilla, although optionally offered with a flour tortilla. Grilled mahi-mahi is also available at all locations.

The first Rubio's restaurant was opened in 1983 at a former Orange Julius site on Mission Bay Drive in the Pacific Beach area of San Diego. The first restaurant offered French fries, calamari, and fish tacos, among other cuisine.

Rubio's Restaurants, Inc. became a public company when it began to issue stock on Nasdaq under the symbol RUBO in May 1999. At the time of the IPO, the company had a total of 64 restaurants, six in Arizona, four in Las Vegas, one in Denver, and the remainder in California.

On August 24, 2010, Rubio's Restaurants, Inc. announced the closing of its merger with a subsidiary of Mill Road Capital, L.P. to take the company private. Rubio's former stockholders were to receive $8.70 per share in cash in the transaction.

Rubio's first restaurant in Colorado open in 1999. Rubio's expanded into Florida through the acquisition and conversion of eight Lime Fresh Mexican Grills from Ruby Tuesday in 2016. At the time of the conversions, the company had 196 restaurants.

=== Mass closings ===
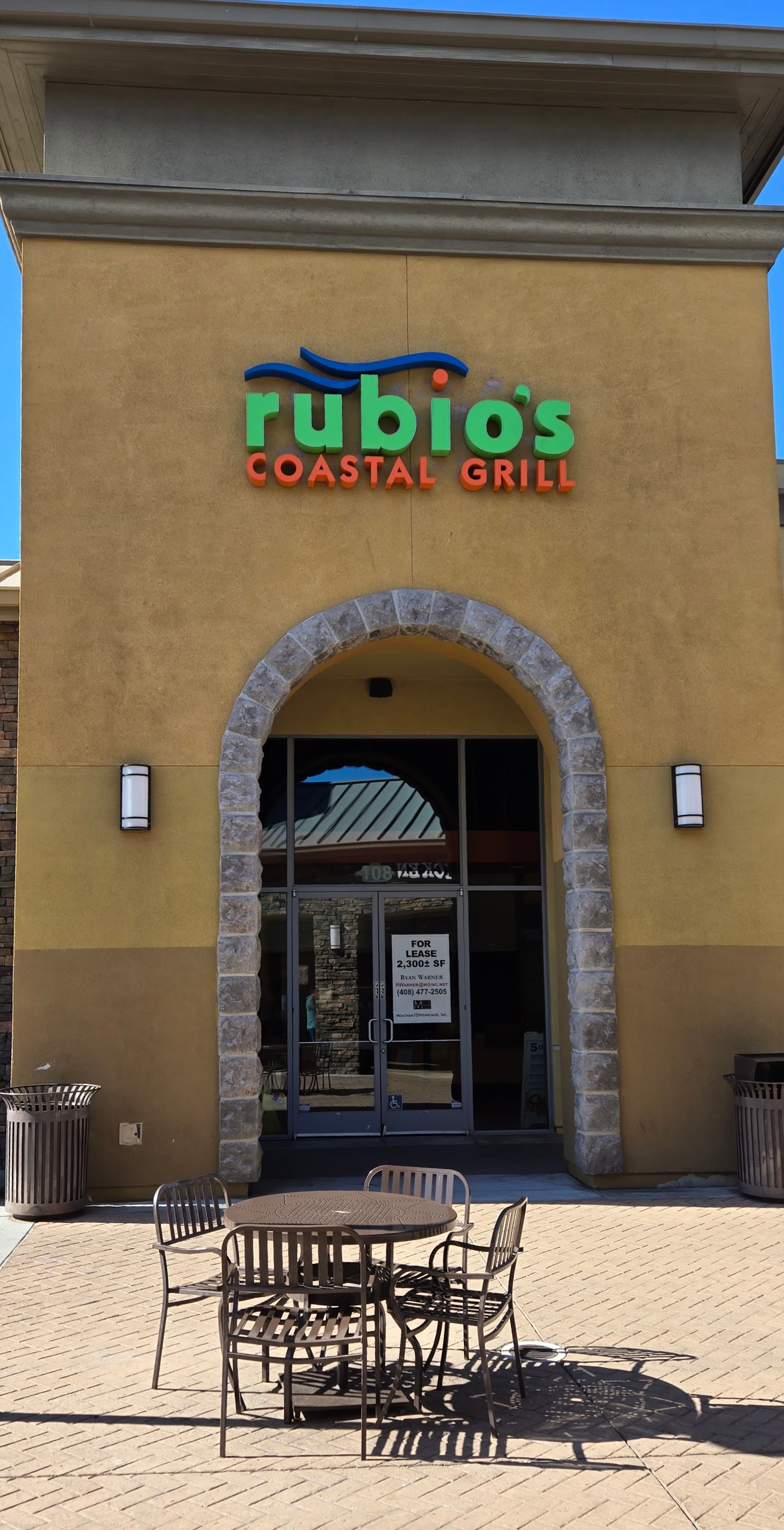
Rubios in the California Bay Area after the 2024 shutdowns

Rubio's locations in Utah were closed in 2019. In June 2020, Rubio's Coastal Grill told Nation's Restaurant News about the closure of all their Florida and Colorado store locations, a total of twelve, due to the negative business impact of the coronavirus pandemic and that they would then focus on their remaining stores in the California, Arizona, and Nevada markets. Prior to the 2020 closures, the company had 170 restaurants coast-to-coast.

In October 2020, the chain filed for Chapter 11 bankruptcy.

On May 31, 2024, the chain closed 48 stores in California (including 13 in its hometown area of San Diego) out of an original 134 in California, Arizona and Nevada. On June 5, 2024, Rubio's for the second time in four years filed for Chapter 11 bankruptcy, with plans to sell itself to its lenders.

Out of the closures in May 2024, 37 of the 48 locations were in Southern California, while the other 11 locations were north of Bakersfield. As a result of the closure, Rubio's completely exited the Fresno, Sacramento, Stockton, Bay Area and Ventura County regions. A few locations prior to the bankruptcy also closed in early 2024, including Walnut and Monrovia. Rubio's did not close any of its Nevada or Arizona locations as part of the bankruptcy. In August 2024, Rubio's was bought by its lender for approximately US$40 million. In addition, Rubio's shut down locations in Chino Hills, the UCLA campus, and Glendale after the buyout. A location in Las Vegas also was shut down after the buyout. The former parent company converted its Chapter 11 case to a Chapter 7 bankruptcy liquidation on May 25, 2025.

== Controversies ==
=== Langostino mislabeling ===
In 2005, a class action lawsuit was brought against the company complaining that the "Lobster Burrito" offered at the restaurant contained squat lobster (also known as Langostino) rather than clawed lobster from the family Nephropidae. Rubio's subsequently changed the name of their product to the "Langostino Lobster Burrito" to avoid future confusion. The burrito is occasionally offered as a "limited time offer".

=== Overtime ===
Employees filed a class action lawsuit in 2007 against Rubio's claiming that the company failed to pay overtime by alleged misclassification. The company paid $7.5 million to settle the lawsuit without admitting wrongdoing.
