= Babamunida brucei =

Scientific classification
- Kingdom: Animalia
- Phylum: Arthropoda
- Clade: Pancrustacea
- Class: Malacostraca
- Order: Decapoda
- Suborder: Pleocyemata
- Infraorder: Anomura
- Family: Munididae
- Genus: Babamunida
- Species: B. brucei

Binomial name
- Babamunida brucei (Baba, 1974)

Synonyms
- Munida brucei Baba, 1974

Species of crustacean

Babamunida brucei is a species of squat lobster in the family Munididae. It is found off of the east coast of Africa, at depths of about 120 metres (390 ft).
