= Babamunida kanaloa =

Scientific classification
- Domain: Eukaryota
- Kingdom: Animalia
- Phylum: Arthropoda
- Class: Malacostraca
- Order: Decapoda
- Suborder: Pleocyemata
- Infraorder: Anomura
- Family: Munididae
- Genus: Babamunida
- Species: B. kanaloa

Binomial name
- Babamunida kanaloa Schnabel, Martin, and Moffitt, 2009

Species of crustacean

Babamunida kanaloa is a species of squat lobster in the family Munididae. It is found off of the Hawaiian Islands and Johnston Atoll, at depths between about 235 and 255 metres (771 and 837 ft).
