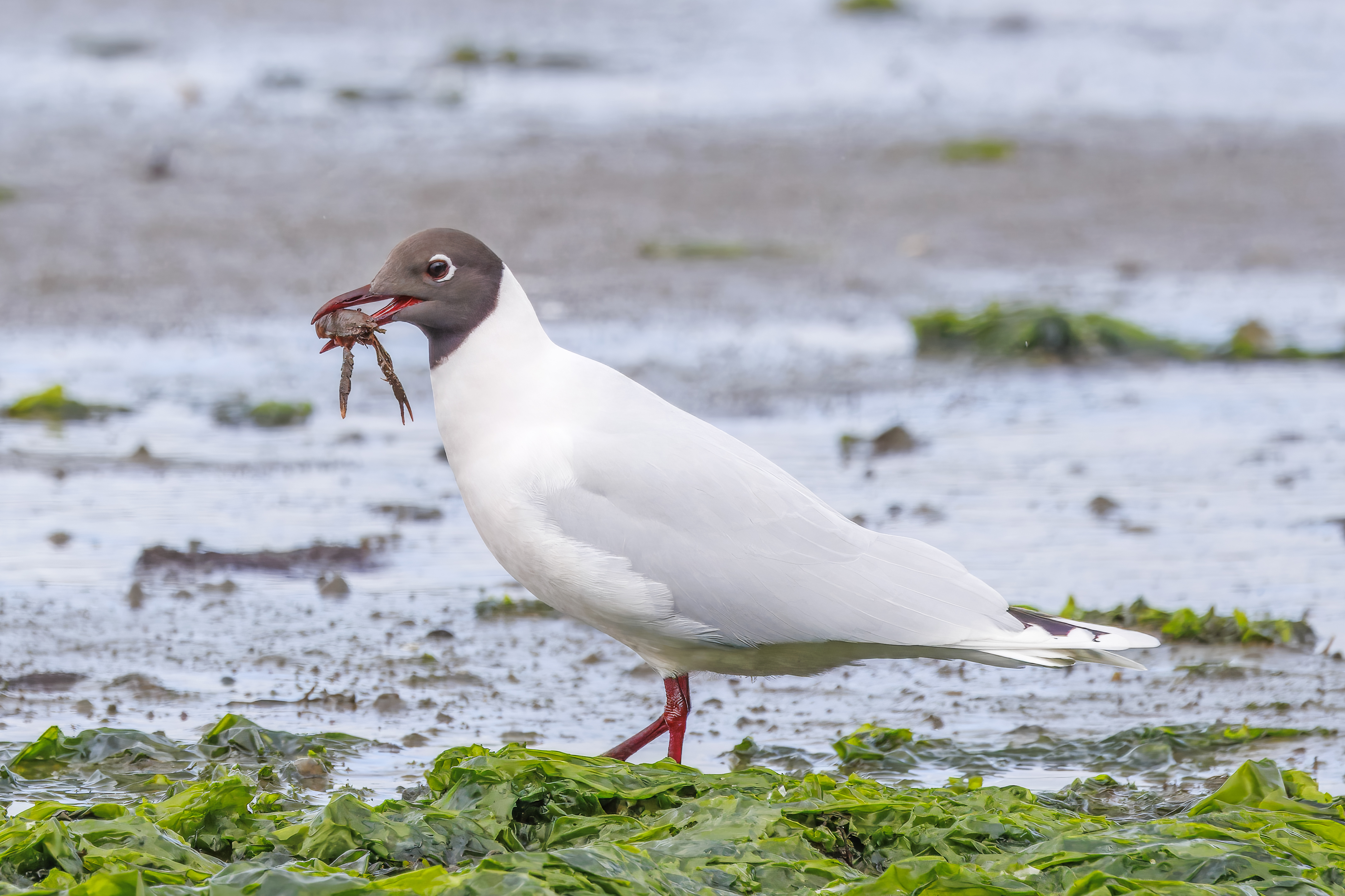
- Caught by brown-hooded gull (Chroicocephalus maculipennis)
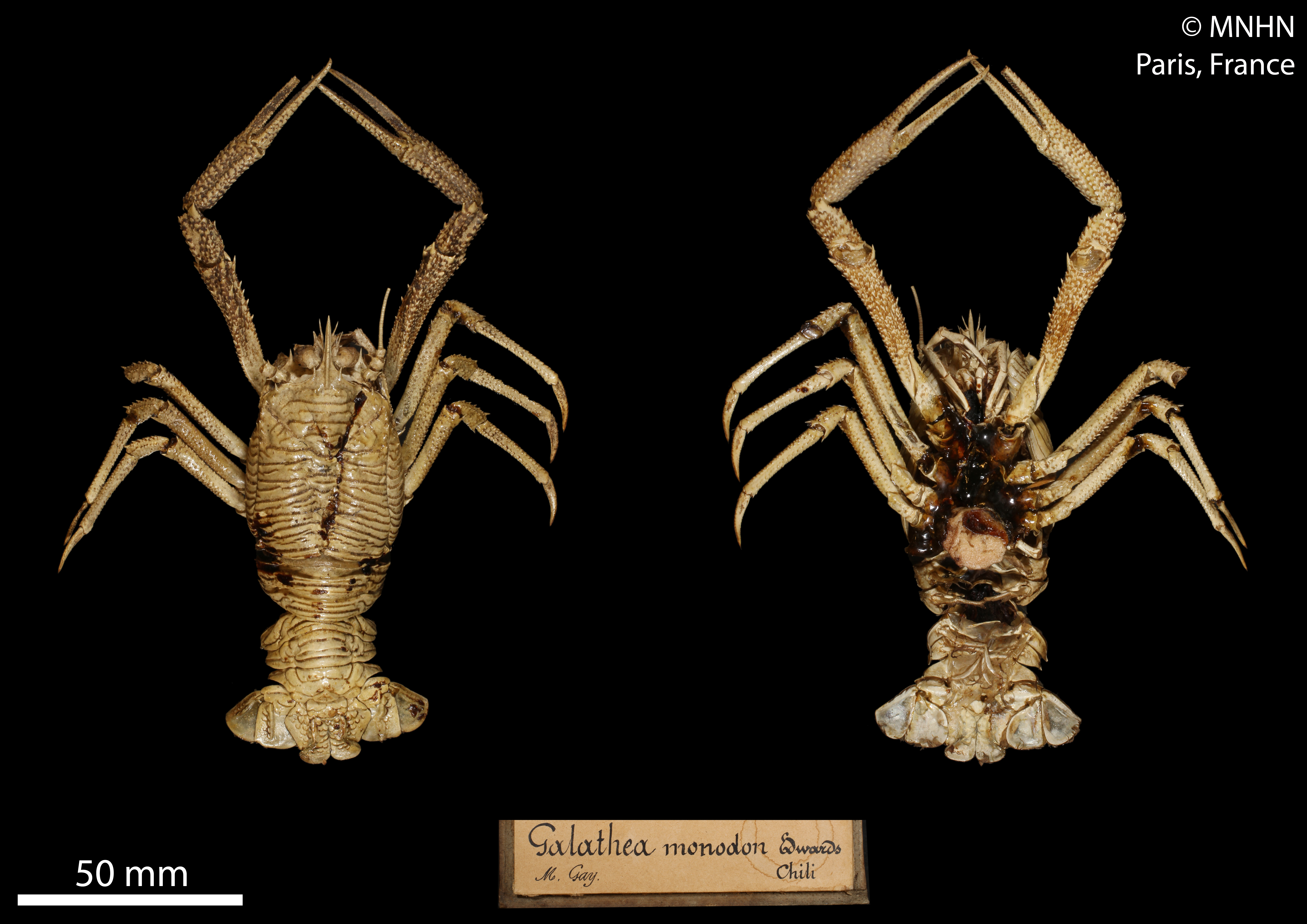

Scientific classification
- Kingdom: Animalia
- Phylum: Arthropoda
- Class: Malacostraca
- Order: Decapoda
- Suborder: Pleocyemata
- Infraorder: Anomura
- Family: Munididae
- Genus: Grimothea
- Species: G. monodon

Binomial name
- Grimothea monodon (H. Milne-Edwards, 1837)

Synonyms
- List: Galathea monodon H. Milne-Edwards, 1837; Grimothea duperreii H. Milne-Edwards, 1837; Munida cokeri Rathbun, 1910; Pleuroncodes monodon (H. Milne-Edwards, 1837)

= Grimothea monodon =

Species of crustacean

Grimothea monodon, also known as the red squat lobster, is a species of squat lobster from the south-eastern Pacific Ocean, where it is the subject of commercial fishery alongside the species Grimothea johni.

== Fishery ==
The fishery of G. monodon in Chile is divided into two areas, of which the southern unit is the more important. The artisanal fishery of G. monodon was banned in the southern unit for three years, from 1980 to 1982, in an attempt to restore the collapsing population. Afterwards, quotas were put in place to limit the fishery, although another three-year ban, was required from 1989 to 1991. Fishing for G. monodon has again resumed, but at far lower levels than before the initial regulation.

== Distribution ==
Grimothea monodon is found in the western Pacific Ocean between 41° S off Chile and 15° N off Mexico.

== Life cycle ==
Grimothea monodon produces small eggs, in clutches of up to nearly 34,000; the larvae that hatch from them pass through five planktotrophic zoeal stages, over the course of around 55 days.
