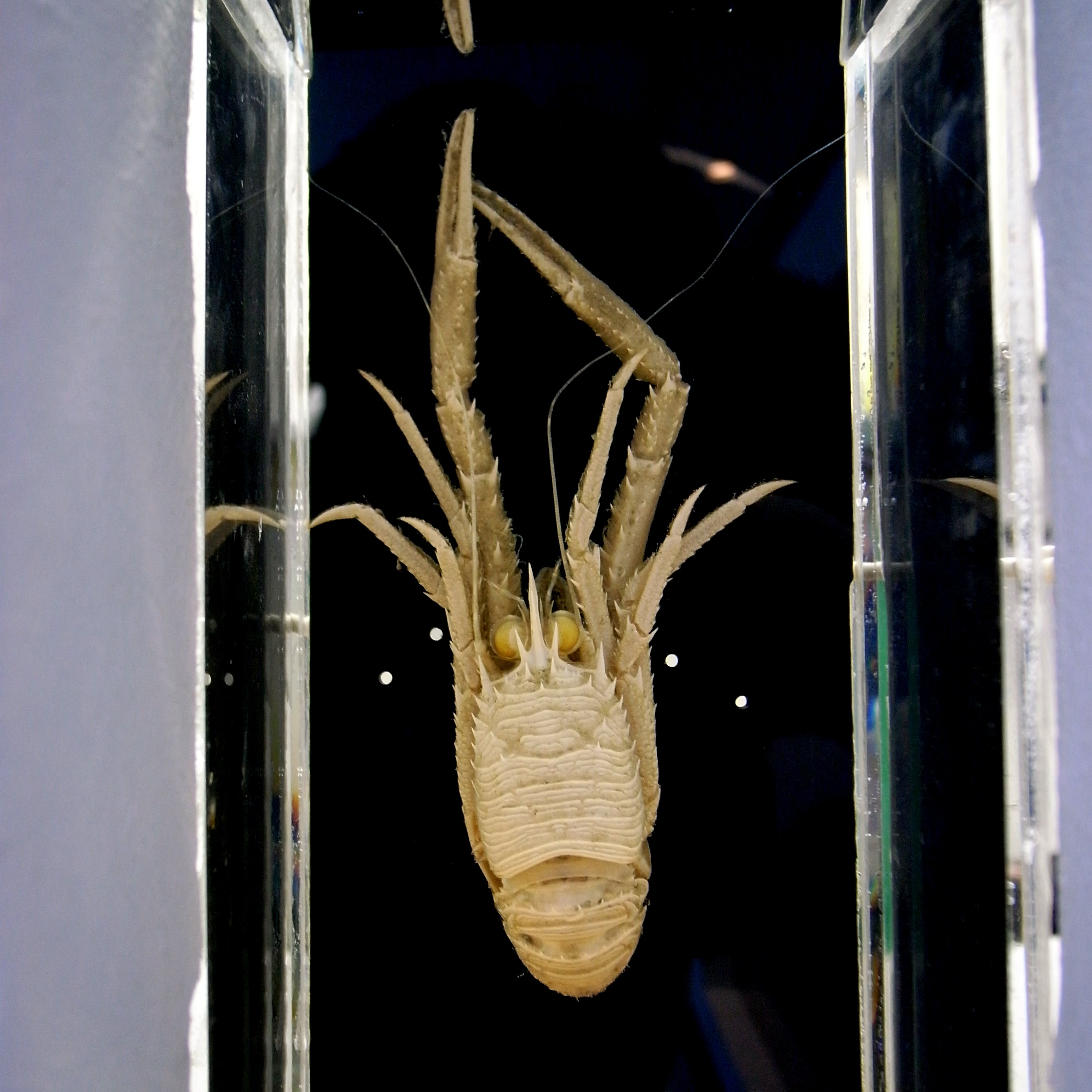

Scientific classification
- Domain: Eukaryota
- Kingdom: Animalia
- Phylum: Arthropoda
- Class: Malacostraca
- Order: Decapoda
- Suborder: Pleocyemata
- Infraorder: Anomura
- Family: Munididae
- Genus: Grimothea
- Species: G. princeps

Binomial name
- Grimothea princeps (Benedict, 1902)

Synonyms
- Cervimunida princeps Benedict, 1902

= Grimothea princeps =

Species of crustacean

Grimothea princeps is a species of squat lobster in the family Munididae. It is found in the East China Sea and off Japan, Taiwan, and northern Philippines (Luzon).
