= Red crab =

Red crab may refer to:

- Red king crab (Paralithodes camtschaticus)
- Christmas Island red crab (Gecarcoidea natalis)
- Dungeness crab (Metacarcinus magister)
- Chaceon quinquedens, also known as the "deep-sea red crab"
- Gecarcinus ruricola, also known as the "red land crab"
- Pleuroncodes planipes, a squat lobster also known as the "pelagic red crab"
