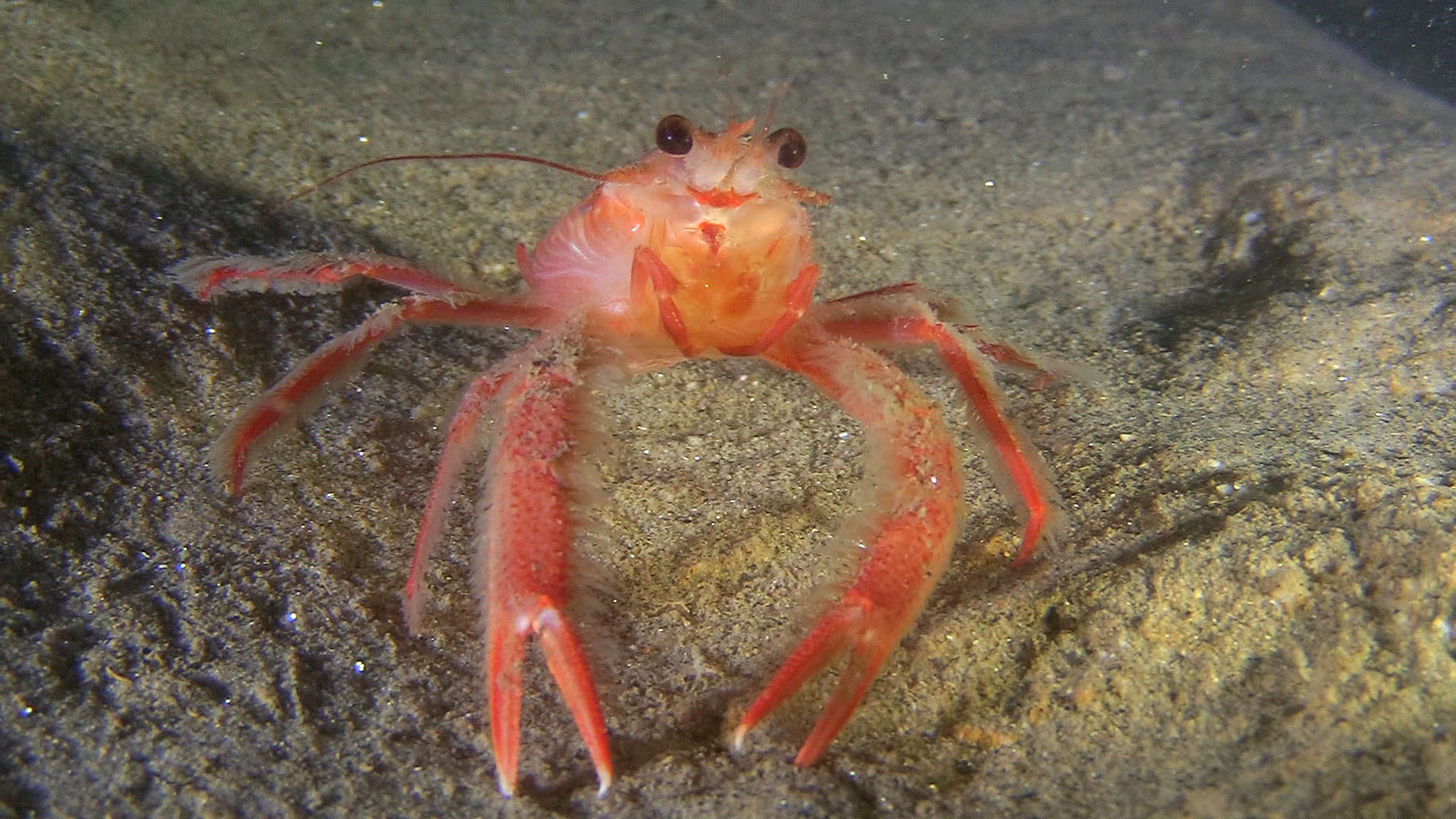

Scientific classification
- Kingdom: Animalia
- Phylum: Arthropoda
- Clade: Pancrustacea
- Class: Malacostraca
- Order: Decapoda
- Suborder: Pleocyemata
- Infraorder: Anomura
- Family: Munididae
- Genus: Grimothea
- Species: G. planipes

Binomial name
- Grimothea planipes (Stimpson, 1860)

Synonyms
- Pleuroncodes planipes Stimpson, 1860

= Grimothea planipes =

Species of crustacean

Grimothea planipes, also known as the pelagic red crab, red crab, or tuna crab, is a species of squat lobster from the eastern Pacific Ocean.

== Description ==
Grimothea planipes is a bright red animal, up to 13 centimetres (5.1 in) long. It resembles a true lobster, but has a shorter abdomen.

== Distribution ==
Grimothea planipes lives on the continental shelf west of Mexico. It is usually found only south-west of San Diego, but in warmer years, its range may extend northwards into California. This is usually indicative of an El Niño event. Adults migrate vertically to near the ocean surface and large numbers occasionally wash up on beaches during warm water events. The southern limit of the species' range is in Chile.

== Life cycle ==
The life cycle of Grimothea planipes appeared for a long time to form a paradox: while an adult population was maintained along the south-western coast of the United States, the planktonic larvae they released were immediately swept by the California Current thousands of miles out to sea. A solution was proposed whereby the larvae use an opposing undercurrent at a lower depth to return to the continental shelf, and this hypothesis was confirmed by sampling different depths of water with a plankton recorder.

== Ecology ==
Pelagic red crab (Grimothea planipes)

Grimothea planipes usually feeds on protists and zooplankton, but will feed by filtering blooms of diatoms.

As the most abundant species of micronekton in the California Current, Grimothea planipes fills an important ecological niche converting primary production into energy that larger organisms can use. G. planipes is accordingly an important food item for many species of birds, marine mammals and fish. It is favoured by tuna, leading to one of the species' common names – "tuna crab". Other fish known to feed on G. planipes include billfishes, yellowtail amberjack, sharks and Epinephelus analogus. The diets of gray whales, Bryde's whales, blue whales and sea otters all include G. planipes. The Mexican endemic bat Myotis vivesi also feeds on G. planipes at some times of the year. Off Baja California, the stomachs of some loggerhead sea turtles have been observed to contain only G. planipes. Since G. planipes may be washed ashore in large numbers, it can be a valuable addition to the diets of seabirds such as the herring gull (Larus argentuatus), whose food supply is usually diminished in El Niño years.
