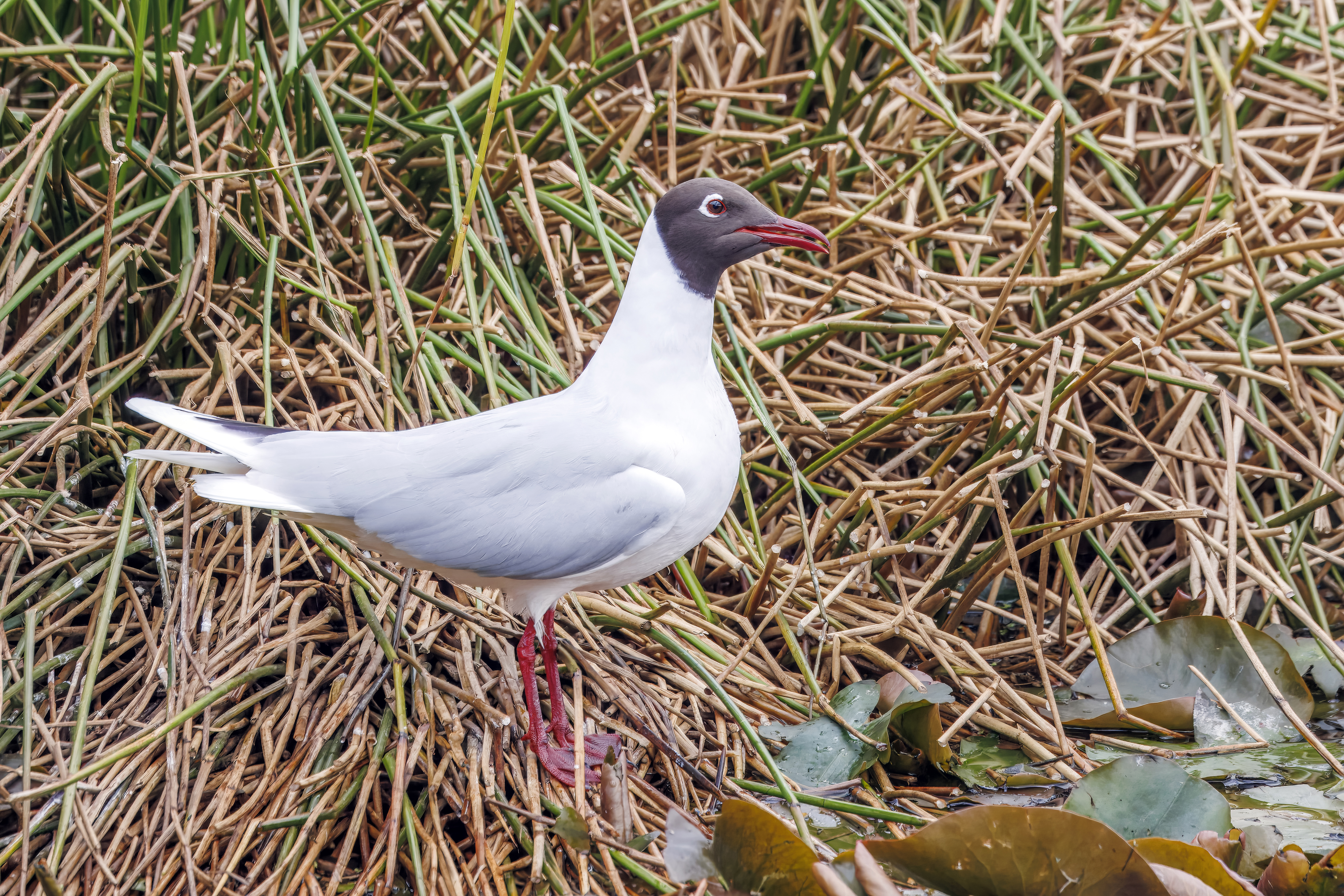
- Adult summer plumage, Chile
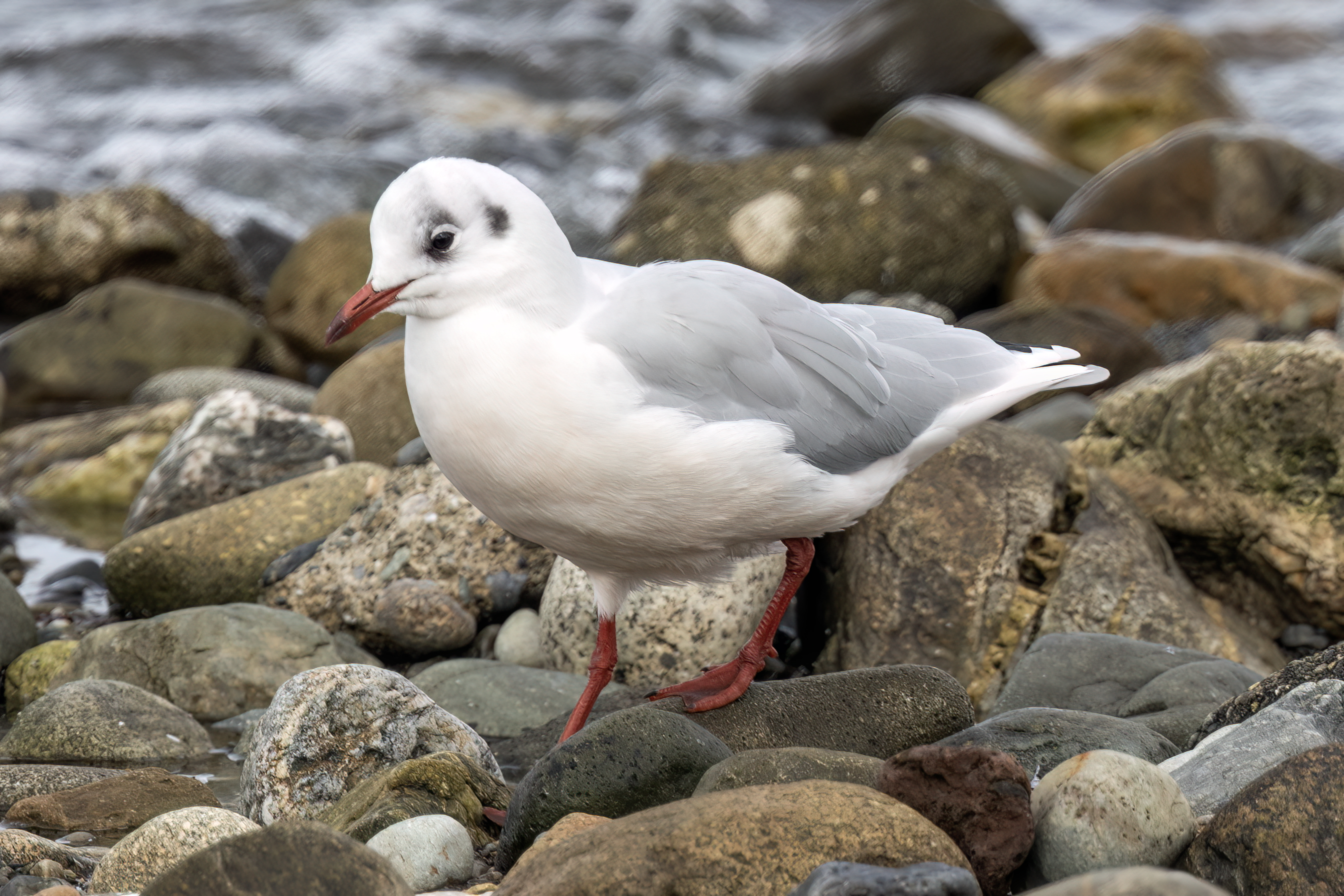
- Adult in winter plumage, Punta Arenas, Chile

Conservation status
- Least Concern (IUCN 3.1)

Scientific classification
- Kingdom: Animalia
- Phylum: Chordata
- Class: Aves
- Order: Charadriiformes
- Family: Laridae
- Genus: Chroicocephalus
- Species: C. maculipennis

Binomial name
- Chroicocephalus maculipennis (Lichtenstein, MHC, 1823)
- Nonbreeding Year-round

Synonyms
- Larus maculipennis

= Brown-hooded gull =

Species of bird

The brown-hooded gull (Chroicocephalus maculipennis) is a species of gull, found in South America in Argentina, southeastern Brazil, Chile, Uruguay, and in the South Atlantic Ocean on the Falkland Islands. Its specific epithet, maculipennis, means 'spotted wings' (macula + penna). Like the other species of the genus Chroicocephalus, it was formerly included in a broad view of the genus Larus.

== Description ==
Adults in the breeding season have a dark brown head and throat with a white semicircle around the posterior of the eye, while the neck, chest and abdomen are white. In winter plumage, the brown hood is largely lost, retaining just a dark spot behind the eye and a dark smudge around the eye. The beak and legs are red, and the eye is dark brown. The outer primary flight feathers are white with black tips (the 'spots' of the scientific name) above and showing more extensively black from below, while the inner primaries and the secondaries and covert feathers are a silvery grey. There is no significant sexual dimorphism, but young birds are distinct, with the wings mottled pale brown, a black bar on the tip of the tail, paler orange-red legs and the bill orange-red with a dark tip. As the plumage is very similar to the closely related black-headed gull C. ridibundus, it has been considered a subspecies of that by some authors in the past, though now universally considered a separate species; they do not overlap in range.

== Distribution and habitat ==
This species is found in South America, breeding from Argentine and Chilean Patagonia, the Falkland Islands and Uruguay. In winter, its range extends up to the coasts of north Chile and central Brazil. Its natural habitats include freshwater lakes, intertidal marshes, river banks, and open fields. The total population is thought to be around 50,000–100,000 pairs; it is most numerous in central Chile and eastern Argentina. The Falkland Islands population is small, only around 600 pairs.

== Ecology and behaviour ==
They are gregarious birds. Their diet consists primarily of insects, carrion, and food items obtained through kleptoparasitism from other birds. In particular they steal crabs from the red-gartered coot (Fulica armillata) and clams from the American oystercatcher (Haematopus palliatus). The profitability of stealing from these birds is 3.5 times higher for the coots than the oystercatchers. They build floating nests among aquatic vegetation at the edges of ponds and lakes. Three to four eggs are usually laid.

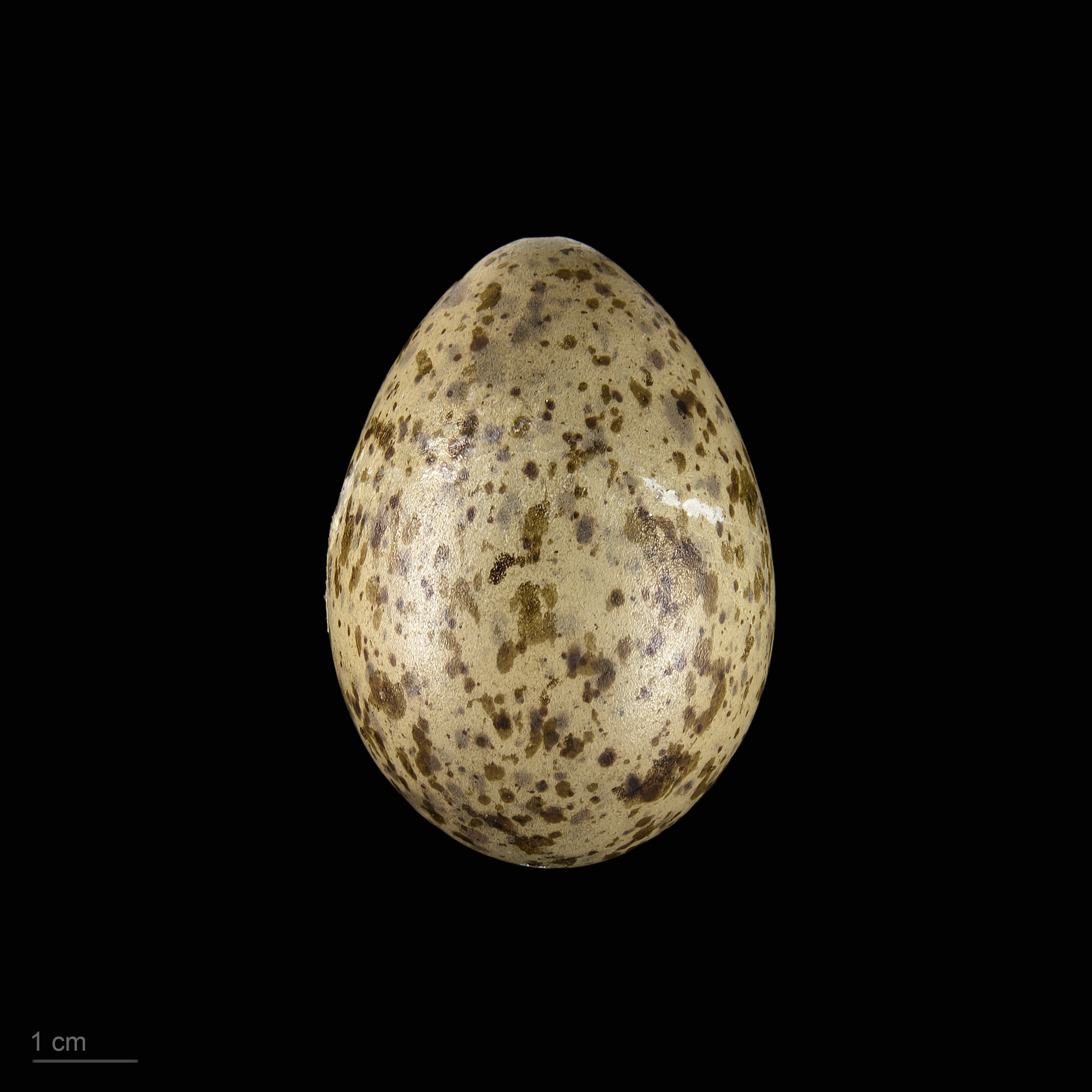
Egg - MHNT

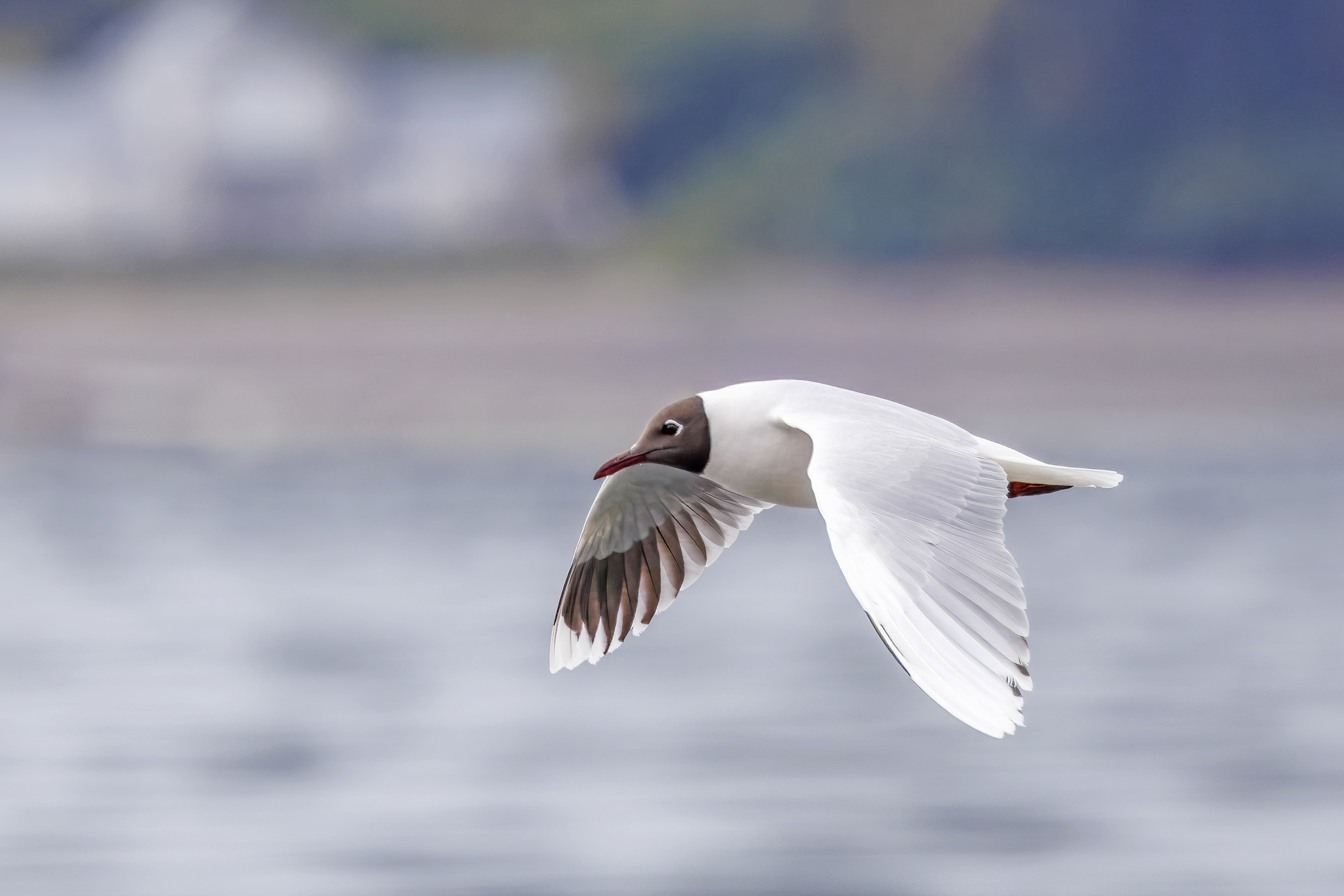
in flight

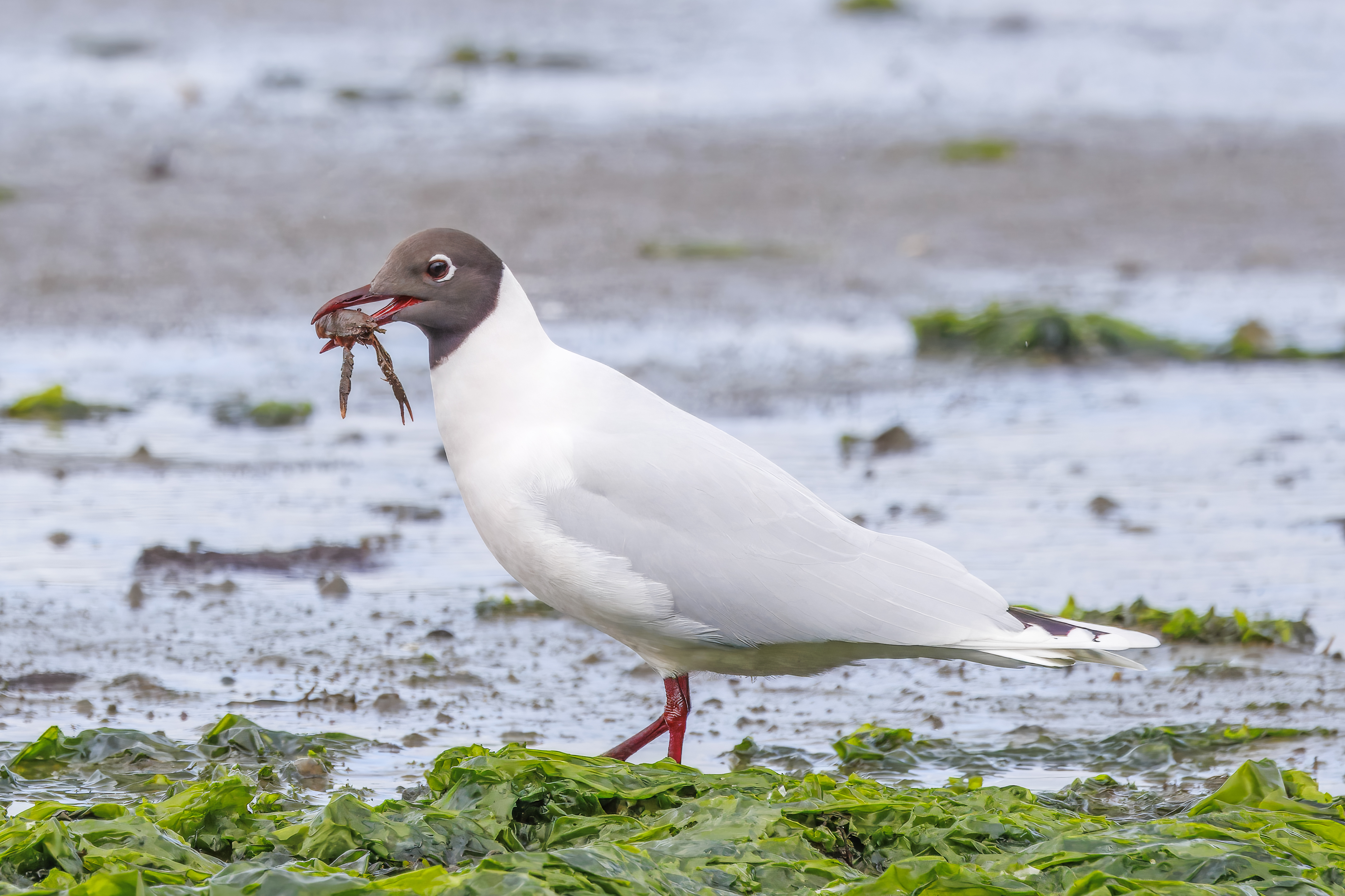
with Grimothea monodon

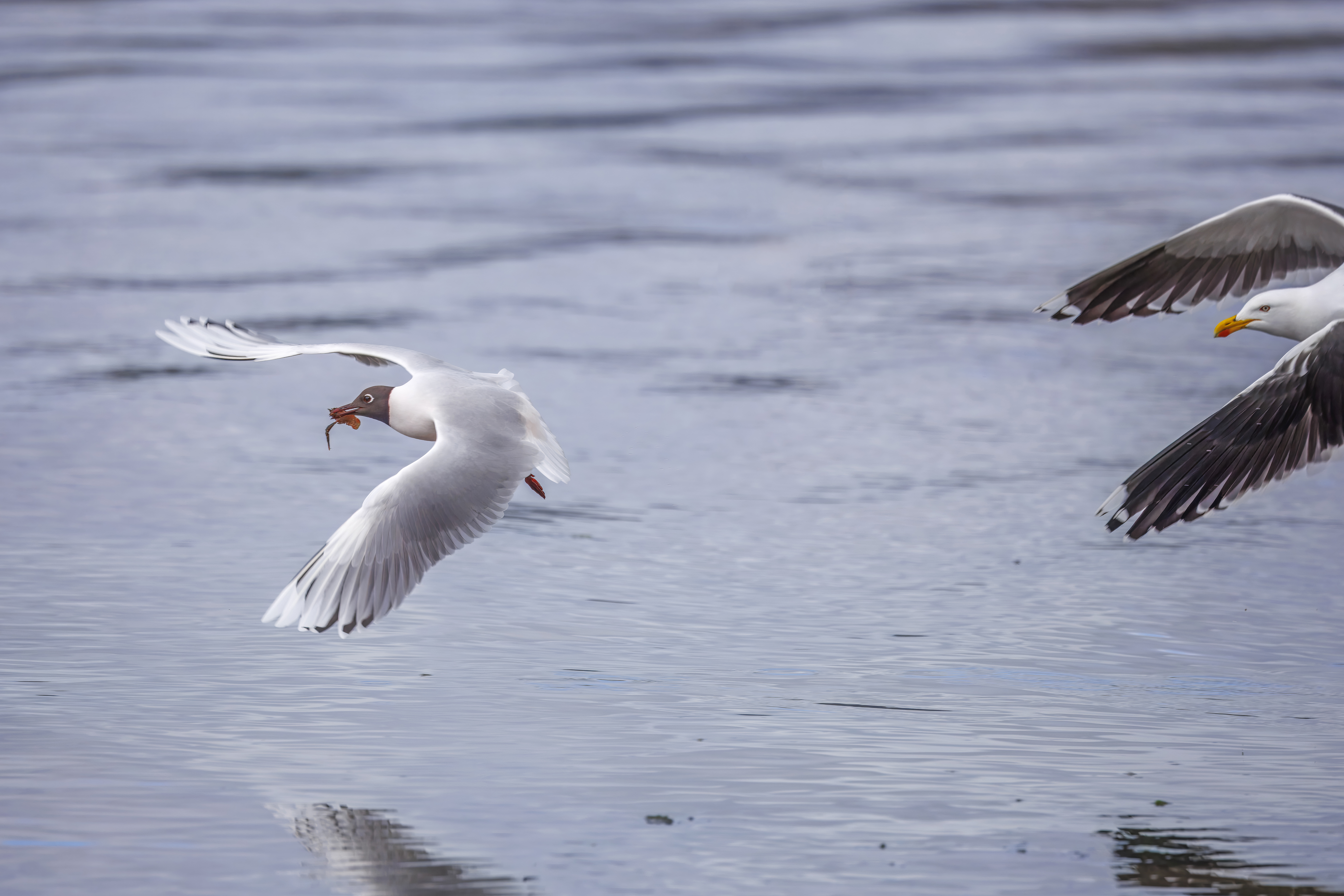
being chased by kelp gull
