= Epinephelus analogus =

Conservation status
- Least Concern (IUCN 3.1)

Scientific classification
- Kingdom: Animalia
- Phylum: Chordata
- Class: Actinopterygii
- Order: Perciformes
- Suborder: Percoidei
- Family: Epinephelidae
- Genus: Epinephelus
- Species: E. analogus

Binomial name
- Epinephelus analogus Gill, 1863

Synonyms
- Serranus courtadei Bocourt, 1868

Species of fish

Epinephelus analogus, the spotted grouper, spotted cabrilla or rock bass, is a species of marine ray-finned fish, a grouper from the subfamily Epinephelinae which is part of the family Serranidae, which also includes the anthias and sea basses. It is found in the eastern Pacific Ocean where it is associated with reefs.

== Description ==
Epinephelus analogus has a body which has a standard length which is 2.6 to 3.0 times its depth. The preopercle has a shallow notch above its angle, the serrations at the angle are slightly enlarged compared to the other serrations on the margin of the bone. The dorsal fin has 10 spines and 16-18 soft rays while the anal fin contains 3 spines and 8 soft rays. The pectoral fins are markedly shorter than the pelvic fins and the caudal fin is rounded. There are 53-69 scales in the lateral line. The overall colour of the head and body are brown to grey, marked with numerous small reddish-brown spots, these are a similar size to the pupil on the body but are smaller on head and fins. There are four broad faint dark bars on upper half of the flanks which rextend on to the dorsal fin. In juveniles the spots are larger than on adults and the dark bars are better defined. This species has a maximum published total length of 114 centimetres (45 in) and a maximum published weight of 22.3 kilograms (49 lb).

== Distribution ==
Epinephelus analogus is found in the Eastern Pacific Ocean. Its range extends from southern California in the United States to northern Peru. It is also found around the islands of Revillagigedos in Mexico, the Galápagos of Ecuador, Malpelo Island in Colombia and Cocos Island of Costa Rica.

== Habitat and biology ==
Epinephelus analogus occurs in both rocky reefs and in shallow estuaries at depths down as far as 107 metres (4,200 in). It is also found in patch reefs. The juveniles occur tidal pools, estuaries and lagoons. It is a predatory species which feeds largely on crustaceans and fishes found on rocky and sandy substrates. During the winter they move towards the shore where the swarms of the pelagic red crab (Pleuroncodes planipes) provide abundant food.

== Taxonomy ==
Epinephelus analogus was first formally described in 1863 by the American ichthyologist Theodore Nicholas Gill (1837-1914) with the type locality given as the western coast of Central America.

== Utilisation ==
Epinephelus analogus is a target species for recreational anglers, small-scale artisanal fishers and commercial fisheries in the Gulf of California where it fetches high prices at market. Along the central and southern Mexican Pacific coasts and in Ecuador and Peru this species is also commercially important. Although the IUCN classify this species as being of Least Concern there are concerns about overfishing negatively impacting its populations.
