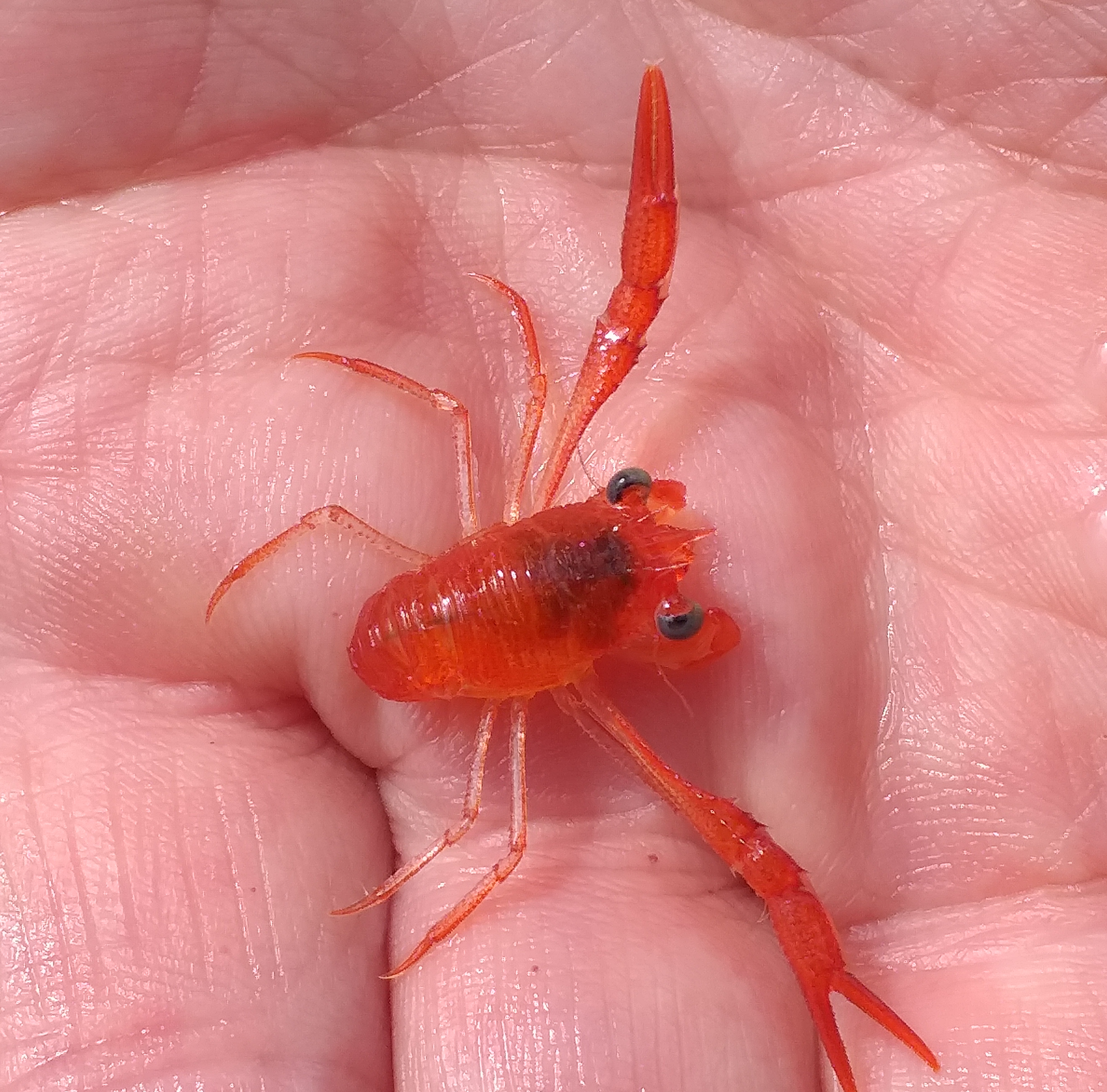

Scientific classification
- Kingdom: Animalia
- Phylum: Arthropoda
- Class: Malacostraca
- Order: Decapoda
- Suborder: Pleocyemata
- Infraorder: Anomura
- Family: Munididae
- Genus: Munida
- Species: M. gregaria

Binomial name
- Munida gregaria (Fabricius, 1793)

Synonyms
- Galathea gregaria Fabricius, 1793; Galathea subrugosa Miers, 1874; Grimothea gregaria (Fabricius, 1793); Grimothea novaezealandiae Filhol, 1885; Munida australiensis Henderson, 1888; Munida subrugosa Dana, 1852; Munida subrugosa var. australiensis Henderson, 1888

= Munida gregaria =

Species of crustacean

Munida gregaria, commonly known as the gregarious squat lobster, is a species of squat lobster found along the eastern seaboard of the South Island of New Zealand, around the southern coast of Tasmania and in a few locations around the southern parts of South America and Tierra del Fuego.

== Taxonomy and nomenclature ==
The species was first described from Patagonia by Johan Christian Fabricius in 1793.

A study of population samples from New Zealand and from the Tierra del Fuego region indicate they are the same species, despite the large distance and deep ocean between these locations.

Its specific epithet (gregaria) derives from its behaviour in the immature phase to form very large shoals or swarms of many tens of thousands of individuals in shallow coastal waters. This can result in mass strandings.

Munida gregaria is sometimes referred to as lobster krill because it looks like a baby lobster and is found in swarms near the surface like krill.

== Habitat and distribution ==
In South America, the species has been identified in Chile, and the Strait of Magellan. During his voyage with James Cook on HMS Endeavour in 1769, Joseph Banks described small shoals near Cape Horn.

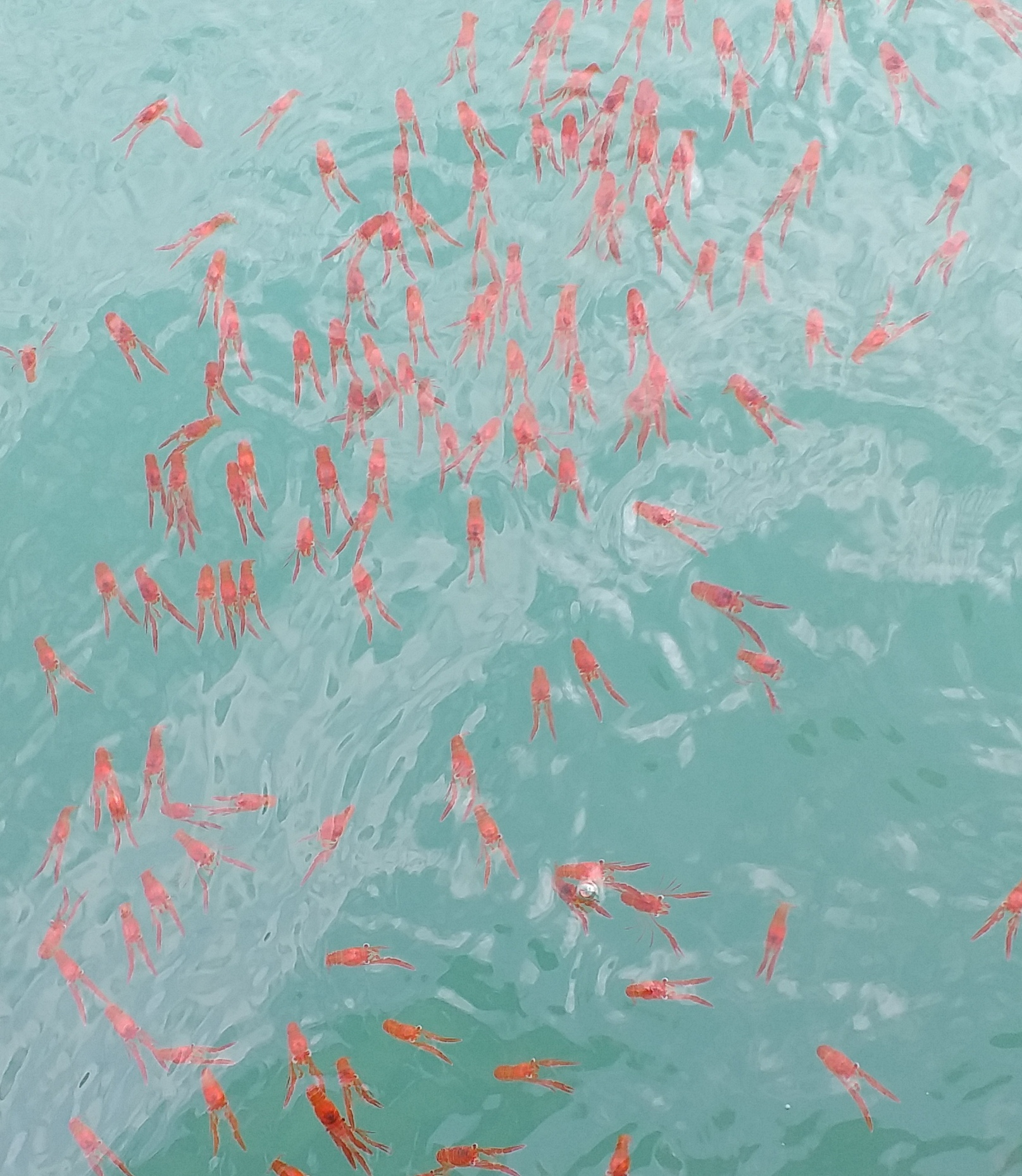
Shoal of Munida gregaria at Diamond Harbour

In New Zealand, Munida gregaria is most commonly found along the east coast of the South Island, particularly around Banks Peninsula and Otago . However, they have also been observed in Milford Sound, are occasionally seen around the southern parts of Cook Strait and the beaches of Nelson. They generally live along coastlines where there is a mixing of coastal and oceanic waters to provide a sufficiently rich supply of food.

There are many species of squat lobster, but M. gregaria is unusual in that it is only one of a very few of the Munida species that aggregate in large swarms. Adult M. gregaria live on the sea floor and grow to around 5 cm (2.0 in) long. They have been found on the sea floor in the outer Marlborough Sounds and along the coastline from Cook Strait south to Campbell Island, where they have been observed at depths of 1,000 m (3,300 ft).

In New Zealand waters, the larvae of M. gregaria undergo 5 stages of larval development from mid-winter until the postlarval metamorphosis in spring, when they form large swarms on the surface and heaped up on beaches. They come inshore in large numbers during this phase of their life-cycle, seeking suitable habitat. Some aggregations seen from the air have been in bands up to 10 m (33 ft) wide but 5 km (3.1 mi) long; formation of shoals varies from year to year, with little or no shoaling observed every 3 to 5 years. The post-larval stage typically lasts until February when the animals begin the benthic phase of their life-cycle and settle on the sea floor. Adults that settle on the bottom may live for 2 or 3 years.
