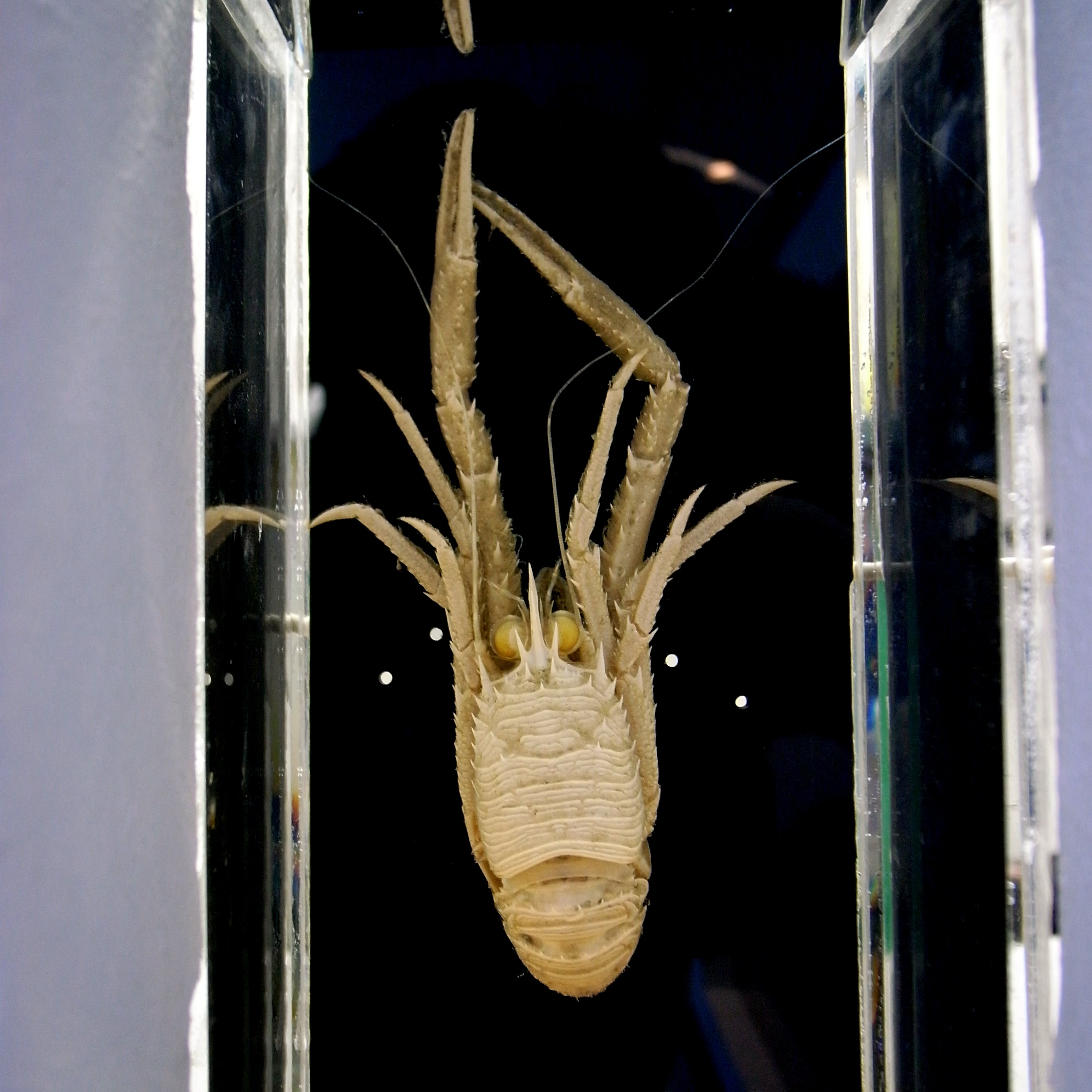
- Grimothea princeps

Scientific classification
- Domain: Eukaryota
- Kingdom: Animalia
- Phylum: Arthropoda
- Class: Malacostraca
- Order: Decapoda
- Suborder: Pleocyemata
- Infraorder: Anomura
- Family: Munididae
- Genus: Grimothea; Leach, 1820

Synonyms
- Cervimunida Benedict, 1902; Grimotaea Leach, 1820; Pleuroncodes Stimpson, 1860

= Grimothea =

Genus of crustaceans

Grimothea is a genus of squat lobsters in the family Munididae.

== Species ==
The following species are recognised in the genus Grimothea:

- Grimothea atlantica (de Melo-Filho & de Melo, 1994)
- Grimothea curvipes (Benedict, 1902)
- Grimothea debilis (Benedict, 1902)
- Grimothea gregaria (Fabricius, 1793)
- Grimothea johni (Porter, 1903)
- Grimothea krishaha Tiwari, Padate & Cubelio, 2023
- Grimothea lipkeholthuisi (Hendrickx & Parente, 2010)
- Grimothea macrobrachia (Hendrickx, 2003)
- Grimothea monodon (H. Milne Edwards, 1837)
- Grimothea montemaris (Bahamonde & López, 1962)
- Grimothea notialis (Baba, 2005)
- Grimothea nuda (Benedict, 1902)
- Grimothea planipes (Stimpson, 1860)
- Grimothea princeps (Benedict, 1902)
- Grimothea quadrispina (Benedict, 1902)
