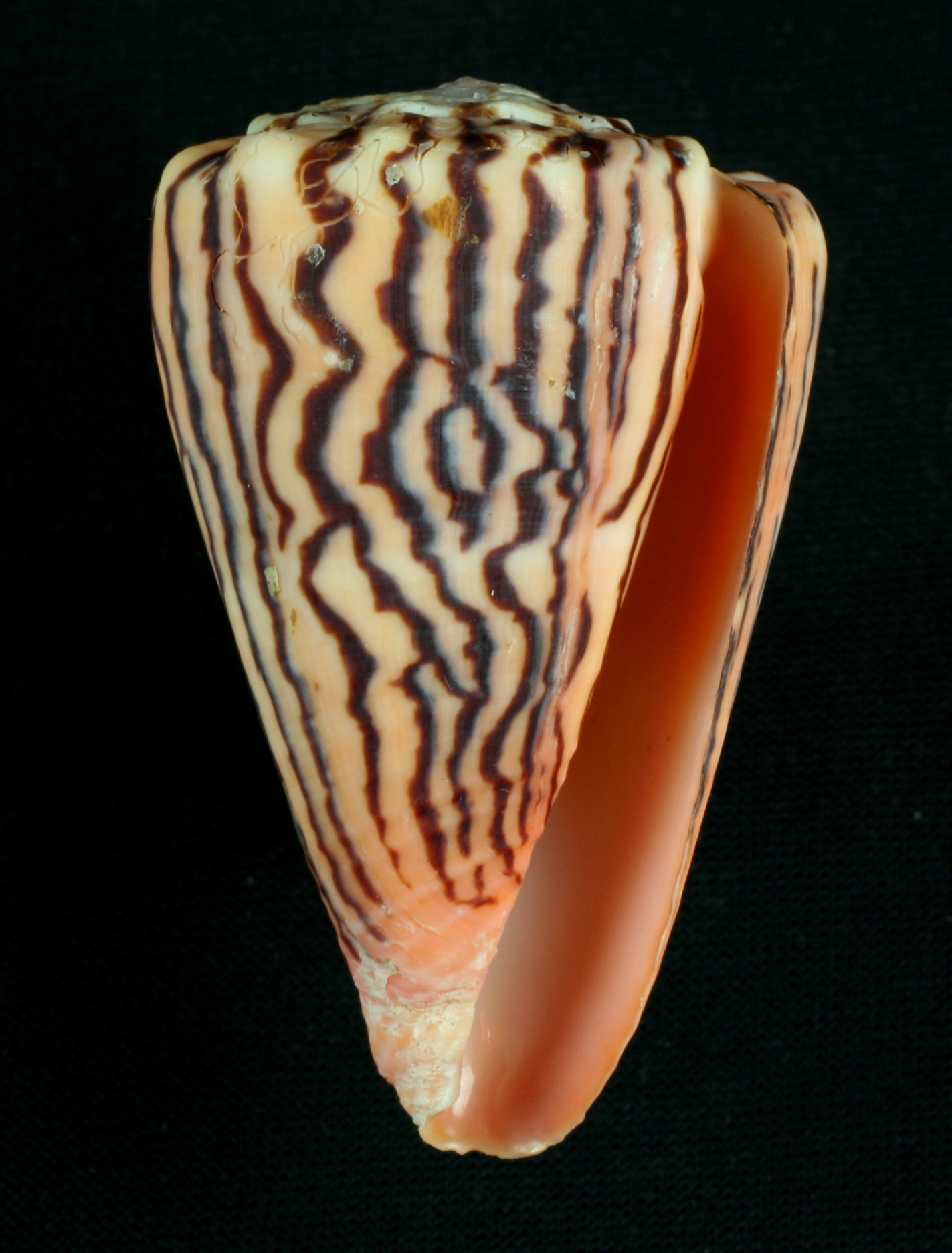
- Apertural view of shell of Conus princeps Linnaeus, 1758

Conservation status
- Least Concern (IUCN 3.1)

Scientific classification
- Kingdom: Animalia
- Phylum: Mollusca
- Class: Gastropoda
- Subclass: Caenogastropoda
- Order: Neogastropoda
- Superfamily: Conoidea
- Family: Conidae
- Genus: Conus
- Species: C. princeps

Binomial name
- Conus princeps Linnaeus, 1758

Synonyms
- Conus (Ductoconus) princeps Linnaeus, 1758 · accepted, alternate representation; Conus lineolatus Valenciennes, 1832; Conus princeps var. apogrammatus Dall, 1910; Conus regius Hwass in Bruguière, 1792; Conus regus Küster, 1838; Ductoconus princeps (Linnaeus, 1758)

= Conus princeps =

Species of sea snail

Conus princeps, common name the prince cone, is a species of sea snail, a marine gastropod mollusk in the family Conidae, the cone snails and their allies.

Like all species within the genus Conus, these snails are predatory and venomous. They are capable of stinging humans, therefore live ones should be handled carefully or not at all.

== Description ==
The size of the shell varies between 31 mm and 130 mm. The low shell has a distantly but distinctly tuberculated spire, and direct sides, slightly striate at the base. Its color is yellowish brown, orange or pink, sometimes without markings, but usually with irregular longitudinal chestnut or chocolate striations most of which are continuous from spire to base. They vary from fine and close to heavier and more distant markings. The interior is yellow or pink. The epidermis is dark brown, fibrous, with distant revolving series of tufted spots.

The broad-striped state is Conus regius; that with the stripes obsolete is Conus lineolatus.

== Distribution ==
This species occurs in the Pacific Ocean off the coast of Central America, from the Gulf of California (Mexico) to Northern Peru.
