= Grimothea johni =

Scientific classification
- Domain: Eukaryota
- Kingdom: Animalia
- Phylum: Arthropoda
- Class: Malacostraca
- Order: Decapoda
- Suborder: Pleocyemata
- Infraorder: Anomura
- Family: Munididae
- Genus: Grimothea
- Species: G. johni

Binomial name
- Grimothea johni (Porter, 1903)

Synonyms
- Cervimunida johni Porter, 1903

Species of crustacean

Grimothea johni is a species of squat lobster in the family Munididae. It is found in the Pacific Ocean, off the coast of Chile. It is known to be host to the parasite Bathione humboldtensis.
