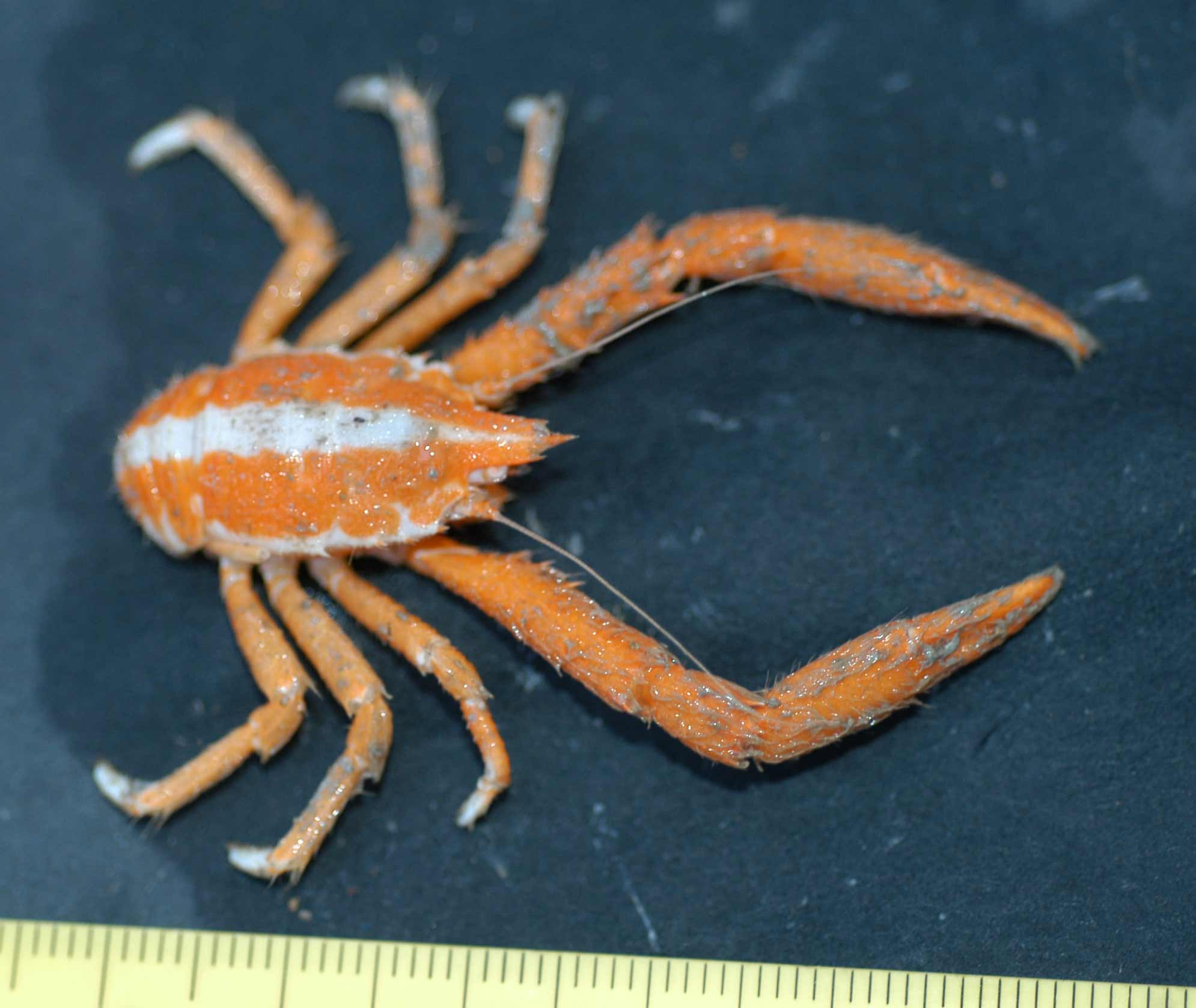
- Munidopsis serricornis (Galatheidae)

Scientific classification
- Kingdom: Animalia
- Phylum: Arthropoda
- Clade: Pancrustacea
- Class: Malacostraca
- Order: Decapoda
- Suborder: Pleocyemata
- Clade: Reptantia
- Infraorder: Anomura

Groups included
- Chirostyloidea; Galatheoidea

Cladistically included but traditionally excluded taxa
- Aegloidea; †Eocarcinoidea; Hippoidea; Lithodoidea; Lomisoidea; Paguroidea

= Squat lobster =

Decapod crustaceans in the infraorder Anomura

Squat lobsters are dorsoventrally flattened crustaceans with long tails held curled beneath the cephalothorax. They are found in the two superfamilies Galatheoidea and Chirostyloidea, which form part of the decapod infraorder Anomura, alongside groups including the hermit crabs and mole crabs. They are distributed worldwide in the oceans, and occur from near the surface to deep sea hydrothermal vents, with one species occupying caves above sea level. More than 900 species have been described, in around 60 genera. If one considers the members of the family Aeglidae as squat lobsters, then those numbers rise to more than 1000 species in 61 genera, and they occur at an altitude up to 3600 meters above sea level. Some species form dense aggregations, either on the sea floor or in the water column, and a small number are commercially fished.

== Description ==
The two main groups of squat lobsters share most features of their morphology. They resemble true lobsters in some ways, but are somewhat flattened dorsoventrally, and are typically smaller, ranging from 18 to 89 millimetres (0.7 to 3.5 inches) in length. Squat lobsters vary in postorbital carapace length (measured from the eye socket to the rear edge), from 90 millimetres (3.5 in) in the case of Munidopsis aries, down to only a few millimetres in the case of Galathea intermedia and some species of Uroptychus. As in other decapod crustaceans, the bilaterally symmetrical body of a squat lobster may be divided into two main regions: the cephalothorax (itself made up of the cephalon, or head, and the thorax), and the pleon or abdomen. The pleon only being partly flexed under the cephalothorax and the cephalothorax being longer than it is broad makes the squat lobster a morphological intermediate between a lobster and crab.

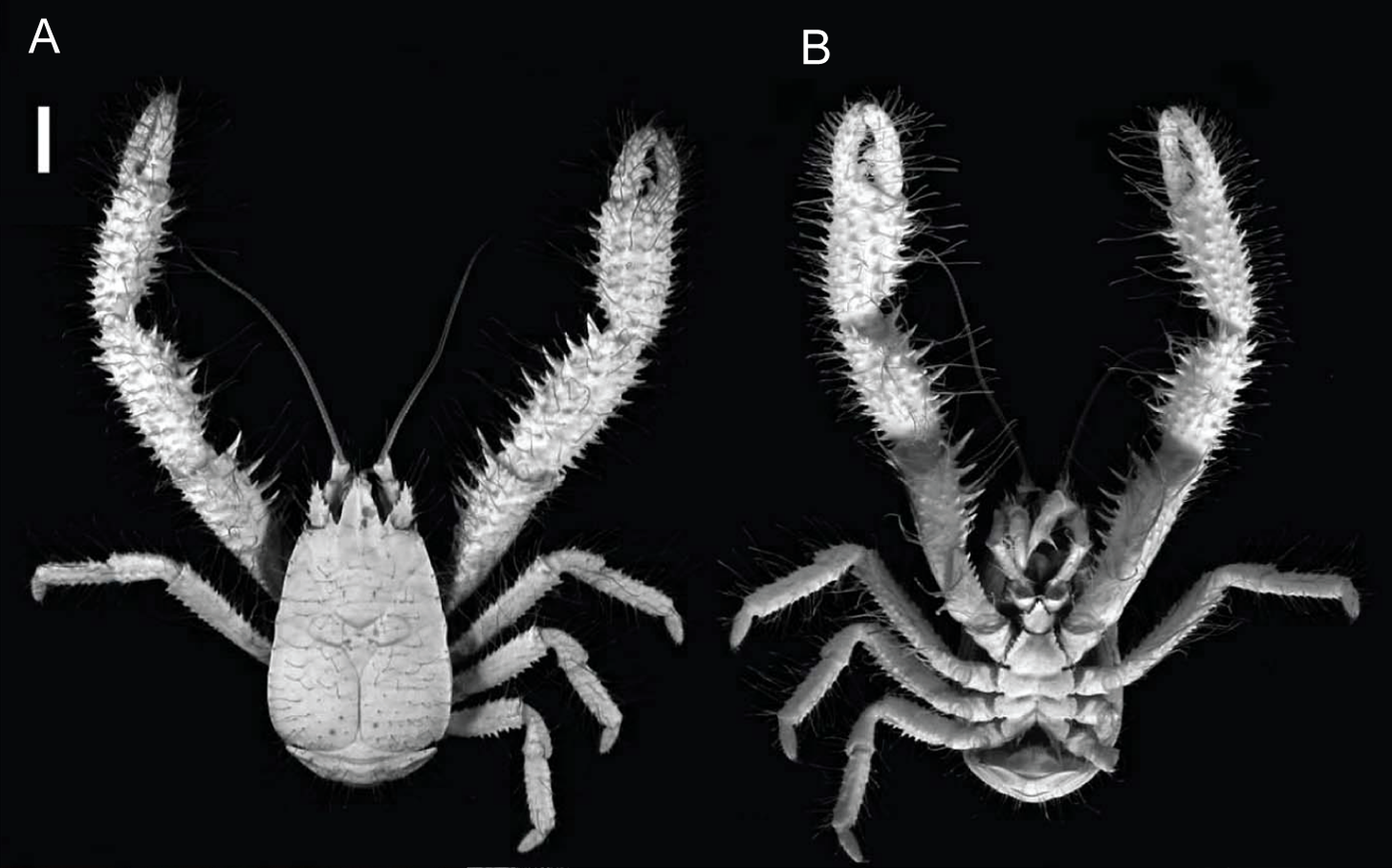
Dorsal (left) and ventral (right) views of the holotype of Kiwa puravida (Kiwaidae); two pereiopods have broken off on the animal's left side.

The cephalothorax is made of 19 body segments (somites), although the divisions are not obvious and are most easily inferred from the paired appendages. From front to back, these are the two pairs of antennae, six pairs of mouthparts (mandibles, maxillae, maxillulae and three pairs of maxillipeds), and five pairs of pereiopods. The cephalothorax is covered with a thick carapace, which may extend forwards in front of the eyes to form a rostrum; this is highly variable among squat lobsters, being vestigial in Chirostylus, wide and often serrated in some genera, and long, narrow, and flanked with "supraorbital spines" in others. The degree of ornamentation on the surface of the carapace also varies widely, and there are almost always at least a few setae (bristles), which can be iridescent in some members of the Galatheidae and Munididae. A pair of compound eyes also project on stalks from the front of the carapace; these are made up of ommatidia with square facets, which is typical of the "reflecting superposition" form of eye. Many deep-sea species have reduced eyes and reduced movement of the eyestalks. In the families Munididae and Galatheidae, there is often a row of setae close to the eyes, forming "eyelashes".

The mouthparts consist of six pairs of appendages: three posterior cephalic appendages and the first three pairs of thoracic appendages. While their function was traditionally believed to be limited to food handling, the mouthparts have a more complex movement pattern that allows them to perform a variety of functions such as prey- and sediment-gathering, sediment transfer, and sediment sorting/particle rejection. In Munida sarsi, the farther the mouthparts are located from the mouth, the more complex in movement and functional scheme they are.

The most conspicuous appendages are the pereiopods, and the largest of these is the first pair. These each end in a chela (claw), and are therefore known as the "chelipeds"; they can be more than six times the body length, although some groups show sexual dimorphism, with females having proportionally shorter chelipeds. The following three pairs of pereiopods are somewhat smaller than the chelipeds and are without claws, but are otherwise similar; they are used for walking. The fifth pair of pereiopods is much smaller than the preceding pairs and is held inconspicuously under the carapace. They each end in a tiny chela, and are generally believed to be used for cleaning the body, especially the gills, which are in a cavity protected by the carapace.

The pleon is made up of six somites, each bearing a pair of pleopods, and terminating in a telson. The first somite is narrower than the succeeding somites, and the last pair of pleopods are modified into uropods, which flank the telson. The pleon is usually curled under the thorax, such that only the first three somites are visible from above. The form of the pleopods varies between the sexes. In females, the first one or two pairs are missing, while the remaining pairs are uniramous and have long setae, to which the eggs can be attached. In males, the first two pairs are formed into gonopods, and are used to transfer the spermatophore to the female during mating; the first pair is often missing. The remaining pleopods can be similar to those of the females, or reduced in size, or entirely absent. In both sexes, the uropods are biramous.

Carcinisation has previously been explored with regard to outer morphology; however, the external changes in body shape also influence internal anatomical features. The use of micro-computer tomography and 3D reconstruction has brought to light anatomical disparity within Galatheoidea. Differences have been found in the ventral vessel system between porcelain crabs and squat lobsters. Carcinisation is also responsible for the loss of the caridoid escape reaction which caused a shift in gonads and the pleonal neuromeres for squat lobsters.

== Development ==
Fecundity, or the number of eggs, increases with smaller-sized eggs and increasing body size of the parent. This results in increasing incubation time and, consequently, increased egg volume. The trend of larger numbers of eggs and smaller sized eggs is mostly found in lower latitudes and cooler temperatures in order to accommodate for the longer incubation time.

The development period of the embryo consists of five distinct stages, which last several months. Throughout the five stages, both the diameter and volume of the egg increase. In the first stage of embryo development, the spherical egg is a uniform dark color. In stage II, the optic lobe and appendages begin formation. Stage III is when the abdominal segments and terminal spines begin to develop. In stage IV, there is pigmentation of the ocular lobe, segmentation of the maxillipeds, and cardiac movement. In the fifth and final stage, the eyes are enlarged and the abdomen is extended.

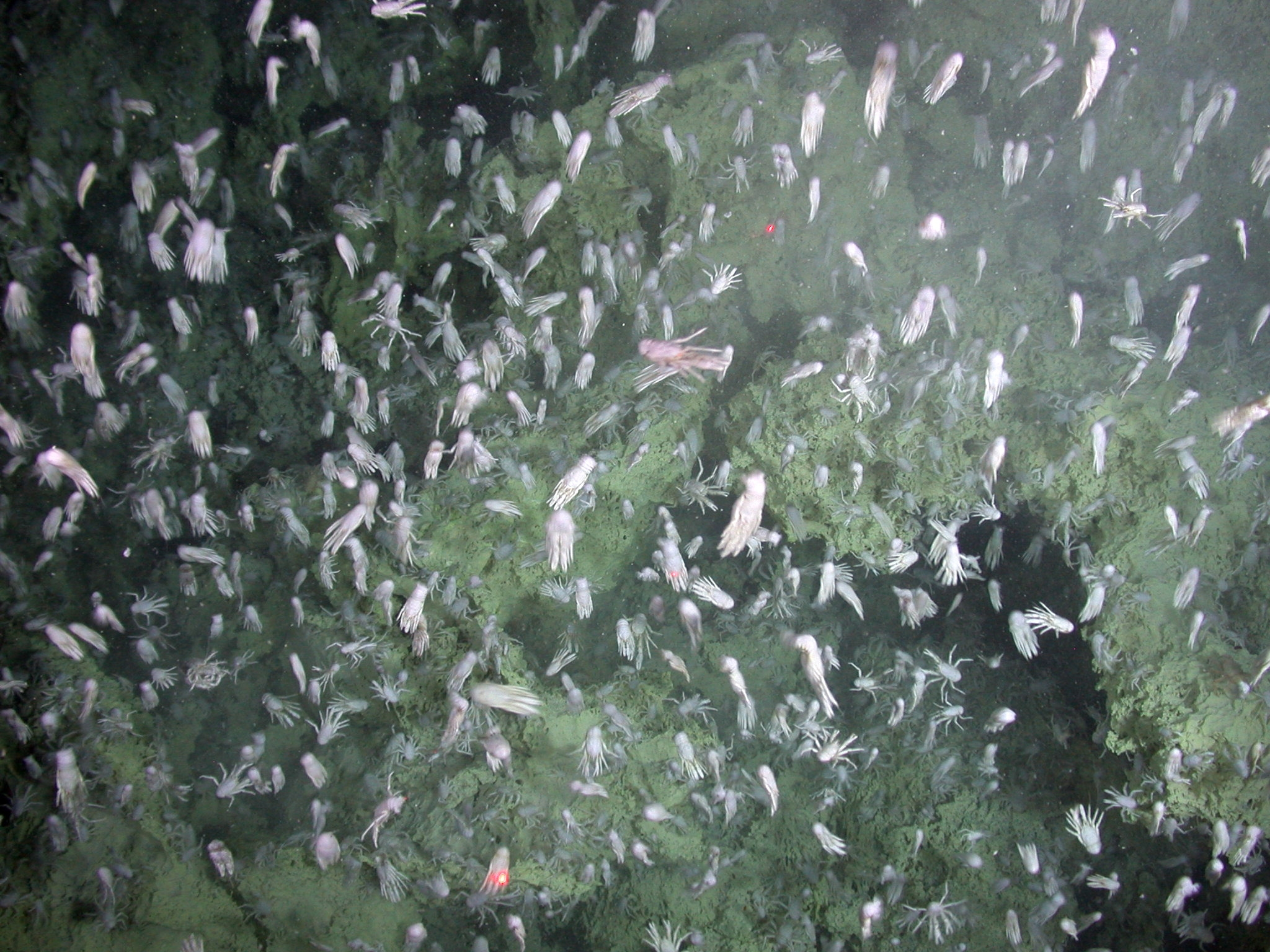
Squat lobsters can form dense aggregations.

== Ecology and behavior ==
=== Aggregation and migration ===
==== Benthic aggregation ====
Squat lobster aggregation is theorized to be proportional to the amount of available organic particulate carbon reaching the seafloor. As such, many species of benthic squat lobsters aggregate into groups of very high population density around a number of different types of highly productive areas of the deep sea, like hydrothermal vents, cold seeps, sites of food falls like whale falls or wood falls, and shipwrecks. Squat lobsters seem to aggregate in these areas because they are associated with the fauna that thrives in them, like Bathymodiolus mussels and vestimentiferan tubeworms, but they are also attracted to the three-dimensional structures found in them. Burrows, crevices, or debris from shipwrecks are suggested to serve as shelter against predators and as food accumulation sites. A variety of squat lobster called Emmunida picta were found to almost exclusively reside on some type of structure, mostly Lophelia pertusa.

Squat lobster species found on seamounts typically have smaller bodies with shorter larval stages, as opposed to rise and ridge habitats. It has been suggested that this is due to the difference in substrates at these habitats.

==== Ontogenetic migrations and pelagic aggregation ====
Pleuroncodes planipes perform vertical migration into the water column from the benthos at different stages in development, an example of ontogenetic niche shift. Early larval stages are found mostly near the sea surface, but older larval and juvenile stages have a wide vertical distribution through the water column, and adults become almost purely benthic, with only a few vertical migrations in their remaining lifetime. In these migrations, they will form large swarms (up to 200 m vertically, and up to 10 km horizontally) in which they rely on the selective tidal stream for feeding.

Munida gregaria form aggregations in warm summer waters of the Pacific Ocean associated with river plume fronts, headland fronts, and shallow internal waves. The density of these aggregations is, on average, 2700 individuals per cubic meter. M. gregaria are able to aggregate in the pelagic region due to a number of unique features as compared to benthic squat lobsters, including fast swimming speeds, reduced density, reduced sinking rates as a result of greater morphological surface area, and optimized aerobic metabolism. M. gregaria also exhibit ontogenetic migration through larvae accumulation in highly productive nearshore waters, which then move toward the mid-continental shelf as they mature, and move completely offshore around full maturation.

In 2020, a study of squat lobsters determined that these crustaceans are far more diverse than previously thought. Through this study, 16 new species within the Leiogalathea genera were described. It was also revealed that diversity of squat lobsters in the Atlantic Ocean is relatively poor in comparison with the Pacific Ocean.

=== Claw position behavior ===
In a resting posture, squat lobsters rest their claws on the substrate in front of them. E. picta were observed most frequently in all conditions with their claws extended into the water column, perpendicular to the substrate. In the case of this study, the behavior was thought to be an avoidance response to the surveillance submersible, hence why this behavior was so often observed. In general, it is thought that this behavior may be a mechanism to increase the perceived size of the squat lobster as an aggressive or perhaps illusory display to ward off predators, as well as an active "fishing" strategy to catch prey.

=== Aggression and agonistic behavior ===
While squat lobsters look like true lobsters, they are more closely related to hermit crabs. Instead of carrying shells on their backs, they squeeze their bodies into crevices and leave their claws exposed to defend themselves from predators or other squat lobsters.

Squat lobsters are generally unaggressive toward each other, but instances can occur in particular scenarios. Individuals in dense populations will decide whether to hunt for food or engage in deposit feeding to minimize aggressive interactions. In general, squat lobsters exhibit no lasting dominance hierarchies, nor do they engage in territorialist behavior. When aggressive displays do occur, as a result of competition for mates or food, the aggressive behavior is ignored 70% of the time, met with submission 20% of the time, and met with reciprocal aggression 10% of the time. A 2001 study examined the effects of serotonergic and octopaminergic systems in Munida quadrispina, and found that injected serotonin elicits aggressive postures and behaviors, including increased likelihood and intensity of aggressive reactions to real or artificial squat lobsters, while injected octopamine reduced instances of aggressive behavior, including increasing the likelihood of escape responses.

=== Feeding ===
Squat lobsters feed on a variety of foods, with some species filter feeding, while others are detritus-feeders, algal grazers, scavengers, predators, and occasionally cannibals. Some are highly specialised; Munidopsis andamanica is a deep-sea species that feeds only on sunken wood, including trees washed out to sea and timber from shipwrecks. Squat lobsters are large enough to be caught by top predators, and can thus form a "direct trophic shortcut" between the primary producers at the bottom of the food web, and the carnivores at the top.

=== Breeding ===
Squat lobsters, in particular Cervimunida johni and Pleuroncodes monodon, are known to mate during the intermolt period. Squat lobster mating was shown to be unrelated to the female molt period, unlike many other crustacean species; instead, mating occurs when most females are found to be ovigerous and there is no or only minor molting activity, i.e., the intermolt period. These species of squat lobster also displayed very short interbrood intervals, or time between mating, generally not longer than a few days.

== Fisheries ==
Flesh from these animals is often commercially sold in restaurants as "langostino" or sometimes dishonestly called "lobster" when incorporated in seafood dishes. As well as being used for human consumption, there is demand for squat lobster meat to be used as feed in fish farms and shrimp or prawn farms. This is in part because they contain astaxanthin, a pigment that helps to colour the meat of farmed salmon and trout.

Despite their worldwide distribution and great abundance, there are few functioning fisheries for squat lobsters. Experimental fisheries have occurred in several countries, including Argentina, Mexico, and New Zealand, but commercial exploitation is restricted to Latin America, and chiefly to Chile. The main target species are Pleuroncodes monodon, P. planipes, and Cervimunida johni.

In Central America, the primary species of squat lobster targeted by fisheries is a species of Pleuroncodes. There is a great deal of confusion over both scientific names and common names, and the exact species is often unknown. In El Salvador, for instance, the commercial catch is generally referred to as "P. planipes", but is in fact P. monodon. Commercial fishing for squat lobsters in El Salvador began in the early 1980s; production increased markedly in the 2001 season, and has continued to grow, now [when?] making up 98% of the demersal resources landed in El Salvador, with annual catches peaking at 13,708 t in 2005. In Costa Rica, aggregations of squat lobsters are avoided, as the fishermen fear the squat lobsters will clog their nets. In Nicaragua, squat lobsters are heavily exploited, especially following a large increase in fishing effort in the 2007 season. In Panama, production reached 492 t in 2008. Chilean squat lobster fisheries initially targeted Cervimunida johni, beginning in 1953. By the mid-1960s, effort had largely switched to P. monodon. In an effort to conserve stocks, the Chilean government instituted quotas for squat lobsters, and the fishery is closely monitored. In New Zealand, Munida gregaria has been considered as a potential fisheries resource, particularly to feed farmed Chinook salmon (Oncorhynchus tshawytscha).

== Classification ==
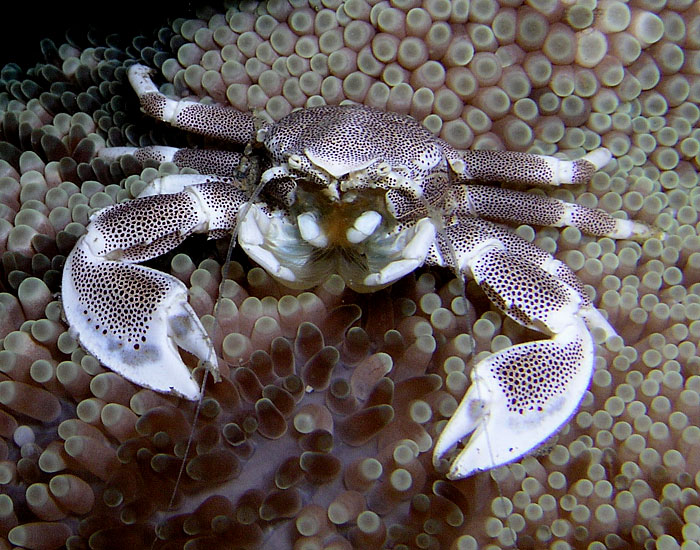
Porcelain crabs, like Neopetrolisthes maculatus, are closely related to squat lobsters.

Broadly, squat lobsters are classified into two superfamilies: Chirostyloidea and Galatheoidea. Chirostyloidea contains the families Chirostylidae, Eumunididae, and Kiwaidae. Galatheoidea contains the families Galatheidae, Munididae, Munidopsidae, and Porcellanidae. The systematics of squat lobsters and the classification of deep-sea squat lobsters is an area of active research due to the limited fossil record. Deep-sea squat lobsters, existing at depths greater than 200m, are classified in the Mundidiae and Munidopsidae families of the superfamily Galatheoidea. Deep-sea squat lobsters display greater morphological divergences and lower genetic divergences evolutionary compared to their shallow-water counterparts. In early classifications, squat lobsters were placed in the superfamily Galatheoidea alongside the porcelain crabs of the family Porcellanidae. This relationship, however, was re-examined in the early 21st-century. Molecular and morphological data indicate that Galatheoidea is not a monophyletic group; Galatheidae, Porcellanidae, Kiwaidae, and Chirostylidae have independent origins. Galatheoidea is the largest superfamily in the Anomura suborder, which is reflected in the wide range of habitats of species belonging to this "superfamily." Few morphological characteristics distinguish squat lobsters from other families in the Anomura. Hence, deep-sea squat lobsters were classified in the Chirostyloidea superfamily in 2012 as DNA sequencing indicated that squat lobsters are not a monophyletic group. For example, Chirostylidae and Kiwaidae are distantly related to the other squat lobsters, and are closer related to hermit crabs and king crabs (Paguroidea), the mole crabs in the superfamily Hippoidea, and the small families Lomisidae and Aeglidae. Squat lobsters continue to be described in both the Chirostyloidea and Galatheoidea superfamilies.

=== Evolutionary history ===
Squat lobsters contain a total of around 60 genera, divided into over 900 recognized species; more than 120 undescribed species likely exist. It is likely that squat lobsters underwent deep sea colonization multiple times in evolutionary history. Squat lobsters underwent rapid diversification in the late Oligocene through the Miocene likely due to a variety of selection pressures, beginning in the Southwest Pacific. Fossil galatheoid squat lobsters have been found in strata dating back to the Middle Jurassic of Europe. No fossils are currently assigned to the Chirostyloidea. Pristinaspina may belong either in the family Kiwaidae or Chirostylidae.

=== Distribution ===
Generally, species richness of deep-sea squat lobsters increases with proximity to the equator and the Western Pacific. A split in the galatheid fauna exists between the Eastern Pacific, containing much less species richness, and the Western Pacific. The center of diversity for squat lobsters is the "coral triangle", or Indo-Australian Archipelago, especially in the region of New Caledonia (with more than 300 species) and the region of Indonesia and the Philippines. High endemism is reported in this area and it is hypothesized this is due to many independent evolutions. This region results in high diversification due to global warming, tectonic activity, and oceanic currents. Modern regions of high speciation of squat lobsters includes seamounts near ocean trenches in the West Pacific, but squat lobsters are found in a range of habitats including continental shelfs, ridges, and abyssal seabeds. The hotspot distribution of squat lobsters in shallow waters seems to mirror the distribution of deep-sea species.

In March 2022 it was reported that a squat lobster, possibly from the genus Munidopsis, had been filmed on the wreck of the Endurance, which sank in 1915 in the Antarctic. This was the first record of a living squat lobster in the Weddell Sea.
