= Chani =

Chani or Chañi may refer to:

== People ==
- Chani Getter, American counselor
- Chani Nicholas (born 1975), Canadian astrologer
- Chani Cohen Zada (born 1968), Israeli painter
- Hassan Chani (born 1988), Bahraini long-distance runner
- Kang Chan-hee (born 2000), South Korean singer nicknamed Chani

== Other ==
- Chani (character), a fictional character from Frank Herbert's 1965 science fiction novel Dune
- Eumunida chani, a species of squat lobster
- Nevado de Chañi, an Argentinian mountain in the Andes
- Phobaeticus chani, a species of stick insect

== See also ==
- Chania (disambiguation)
- Chanie, a village in Podlaskie Voivodeship, Poland
