= Guy Luzon =

Israeli football manager (born 1975

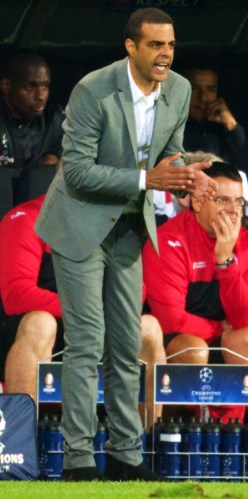
- Luzon as the head coach of Standard Liège in 2014

Personal information
- Full name: Guy Igal Luzon
- Date of birth: 7 August 1975 (age 51)
- Place of birth: Petah Tikva, Israel
- Height: 5 ft 11 in (1.80 m)
- Position: Midfielder

Team information
- Current team: Israel U21

Youth career
- 1985–1995: Maccabi Petah Tikva

Senior career*
Years	Team	Apps	(Gls)
1992–1996	Maccabi Petah Tikva	11	(0)

Managerial career
- 2001–2007: Maccabi Petah Tikva
- 2007: Hapoel Tel Aviv
- 2008: Maccabi Petah Tikva
- 2008–2010: Bnei Yehuda
- 2010–2013: Israel U21
- 2013–2014: Standard Liège
- 2015: Charlton Athletic
- 2016–2017: Hapoel Tel Aviv
- 2017: Maccabi Haifa
- 2018: Beitar Jerusalem
- 2019–2021: Maccabi Petah Tikva
- 2022–: Israel U21
- * Club domestic league appearances and goals

Guy Igal Luzon (Hebrew: גיא לוזון; born 7 August 1975) is an Israeli football manager and former player who manages the Israel national under-21 team.

== Club career ==
Guy Luzon was a graduate of the Maccabi Petah Tikva youth program, joining Maccabi Petah Tikva at the age of 10. Luz on started playing for the first team at the age of 18, making his debut against Beitar Tel Aviv in 1992. He played for Maccabi Petah Tikva for 3 years, until an injury caused him to retire at the age of 21 in 1996.

== Managerial career ==
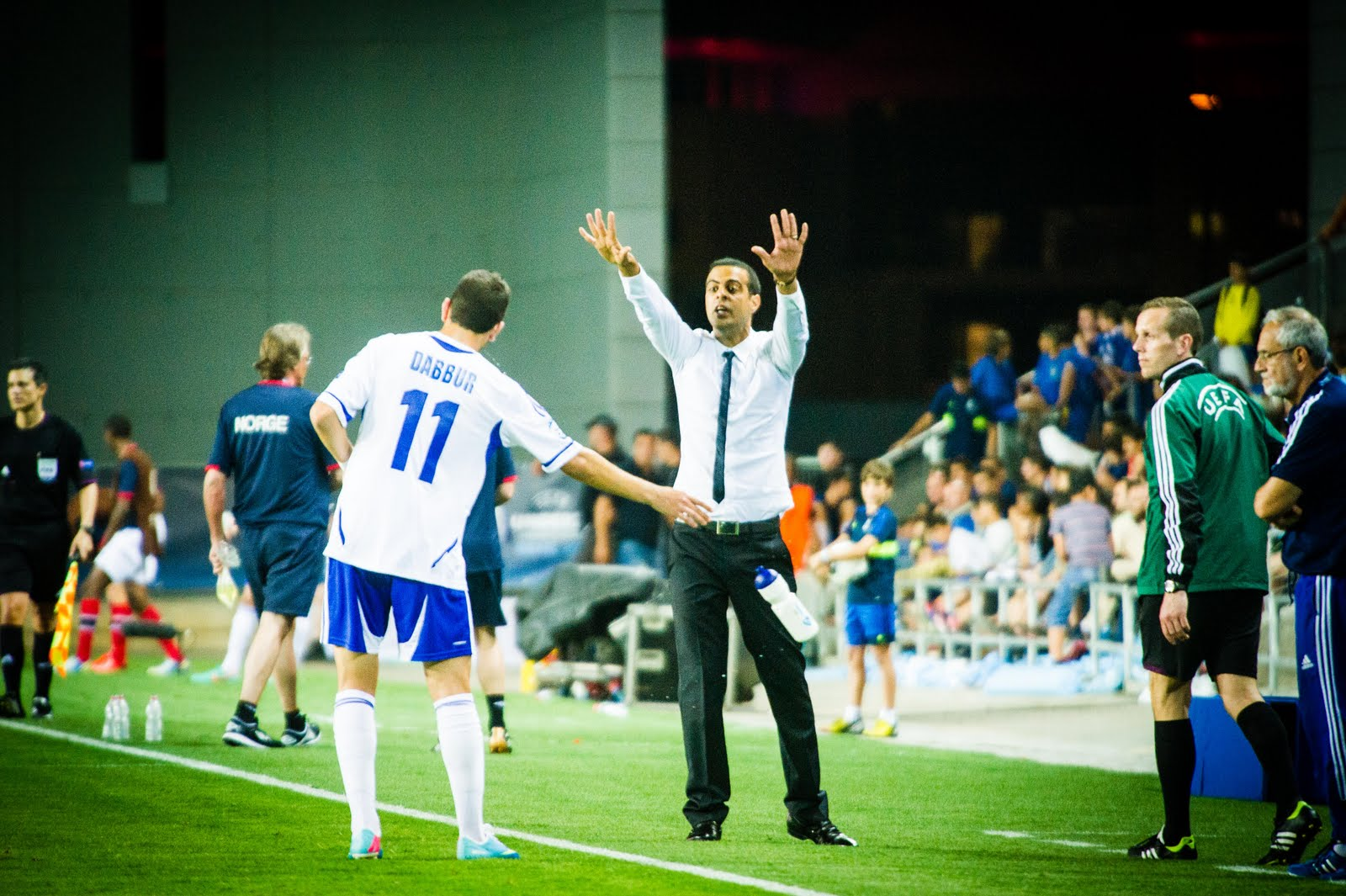

After Luzon's retirement from football, he was offered a job to coach the Maccabi Petah Tikva youth team, under head coach Eli Ohana. Luzon took over as manager after Ohana in the 2001–02 Israeli Premier League season, leading Maccabi to finish in 8th place. Luzon's biggest success at Maccabi was winning the Toto Cup in 2004 along with placing second in the 2004–05 Israeli Premier League and qualifying for the UEFA Cup 2nd Qualifying Round. Luzon was appointed by Hapoel Tel Aviv before the beginning of the 2007–08 Israeli Premier League season, however he resigned on 25 November 2007 when Hapoel was bottom of the league with only six points. Luzon returned to coach Maccabi Petah Tikva, however he resigned after only a few months, on 6 April 2008, because of several losses. On 12 June 2008, Luzon was appointed as manager of Bnei Yehuda, leading them to the 2009–10 UEFA Europa League, where they had several victories before being knocked out by PSV Eindhoven in the play-off round.

On 4 August 2010, Luzon was appointed to coach the Israel under-21 national team, with which he competed at the 2013 UEFA European Under-21 Championship because Israel qualified automatically as hosts. Luzon led the Israeli U-21 team to a third-place finish in Group A, including a victory against the England U-21's. Luzon was appointed by Standard Liège on 27 May 2013. Luzon exceeded expectations, leading Standard to a second-place finish in the 2013–14 Belgian Pro League and qualifying for the 2014–15 UEFA Champions League, where they lost in the play-off round to Zenit Saint Petersburg. On 20 October 2014, Luzon left his job at Standard because of the poor results in the beginning of the season.

On 13 January 2015, Luzon was appointed as head coach of the English club Charlton Athletic. His first game in charge of Charlton Athletic was a 0–0 tie with Wolverhampton Wanderers on 24 January 2015. Luzon's first win as Charlton Athletic's coach was a 3–0 win against Brentford on 14 February 2015. Luzon was dismissed by Charlton on 24 October 2015, following poor results at the beginning of the season.

On 13 February 2017, Luzon was appointed the manager of Maccabi Haifa.

== Criticism ==
In the course of his career, several cases of problematic behavior are known that resulted in intense criticism towards him.

After the victory of the young Israeli national team in the 2013 UEFA European Under-21 Championship over England in a protocol match, Luzon celebrated the victory in an exaggerated way, which led to criticism towards him on social networks.

Luzon was also known for excessive celebrations when he coached Standard Liege in Belgium, and Charlton Athletic in England.

In the playoff game against Ireland, in which Israel's young team qualified for the 2023 UEFA European Under-21 Championship under Luzon's coaching, he slapped Ziv Morgan, a player on the team, which resulted in many condemnations and angry criticism of him in the media and social networks. In addition, Luzon said in an interview at the end of the game, "I arranged a vacation for the Israelis in Bucharest with an alibi" (the tournament was held in Romania and Georgia), a statement that was condemned by the Ministry for Social Equality, Merav Cohen. In the end the team was not drawn in the games in Romania, but only in Georgia.

== Managerial statistics ==
As of match played 19 March 2017

Managerial record by team and tenure
Team	From	To	Record					Ref
Team	From	To	P	W	D	L	Win %	Ref
Standard Liège	1 July 2013	20 October 2014	69	35	15	19	50.7	
Charlton Athletic	22 January 2015	24 October 2015	36	12	9	15	33.3	
Maccabi Haifa	13 February 2017	9 December 2017	5	3	0	2	60.0	
Total			110	50	24	36	45.5	—

== Honours ==
=== As a player ===
- Toto Cup:
  - Winner (1): 1994–95

=== As a manager ===
- Toto Cup:
  - Winner (1): 2003–04
- Israeli Premier League:
  - Runner-up (1): 2004–05
- Israel State Cup:
  - Runner-up (1): 2010
- Belgian Pro League:
  - Runner-up (1): 2013–14
