= Uroptychus orientalis =

Scientific classification
- Kingdom: Animalia
- Phylum: Arthropoda
- Clade: Pancrustacea
- Class: Malacostraca
- Order: Decapoda
- Suborder: Pleocyemata
- Infraorder: Anomura
- Family: Chirostylidae
- Genus: Uroptychus
- Species: U. orientalis

Binomial name
- Uroptychus orientalis Baba & Lin, 2008

Species of crustacean

Uroptychus orientalis is a species of chirostylid squat lobster first found in Taiwan. This species is separated from U. occidentalis by its shorter antennal scale and dactyli P2–4 with their ultimate and penultimate spines being subequal in size.
