= Uroptychus singularis =

Scientific classification
- Kingdom: Animalia
- Phylum: Arthropoda
- Clade: Pancrustacea
- Class: Malacostraca
- Order: Decapoda
- Suborder: Pleocyemata
- Infraorder: Anomura
- Family: Chirostylidae
- Genus: Uroptychus
- Species: U. singularis

Binomial name
- Uroptychus singularis Baba & Lin, 2008

Species of crustacean

Uroptychus singularis is a species of chirostylid squat lobster first found in Taiwan. This species is distinguished from U. australis by its single, unpaired terminal spine on its flexor margin of pereopods 2–4.
