= Uroptychus anacaena =

Scientific classification
- Kingdom: Animalia
- Phylum: Arthropoda
- Clade: Pancrustacea
- Class: Malacostraca
- Order: Decapoda
- Suborder: Pleocyemata
- Infraorder: Anomura
- Family: Chirostylidae
- Genus: Uroptychus
- Species: U. anacaena

Binomial name
- Uroptychus anacaena Baba & Lin, 2008

Species of crustacean

Uroptychus anacaena is a species of chirostylid squat lobster first found in Taiwan. U. anacaena and U. anatonus are similar but can be distinguished from each other by the shape of their 4th sternite and the length of their antennal scale. Both species resemble U. maori and U. brucei, but lack a ventral subterminal spine on their first pereopod's ischium.
