= Uroptychus anatonus =

Scientific classification
- Kingdom: Animalia
- Phylum: Arthropoda
- Clade: Pancrustacea
- Class: Malacostraca
- Order: Decapoda
- Suborder: Pleocyemata
- Infraorder: Anomura
- Family: Chirostylidae
- Genus: Uroptychus
- Species: U. anatonus

Binomial name
- Uroptychus anatonus Baba & Lin, 2008

Species of crustacean

Uroptychus anatonus is a species of chirostylid squat lobster first found in Taiwan. U. anatonus and U. anacaena are similar but can be distinguished from each other by the shape of their 4th sternite and the length of their antennal scale. Both species resemble U. maori and U. brucei, but lack a ventral subterminal spine on their first pereopod's ischium.
