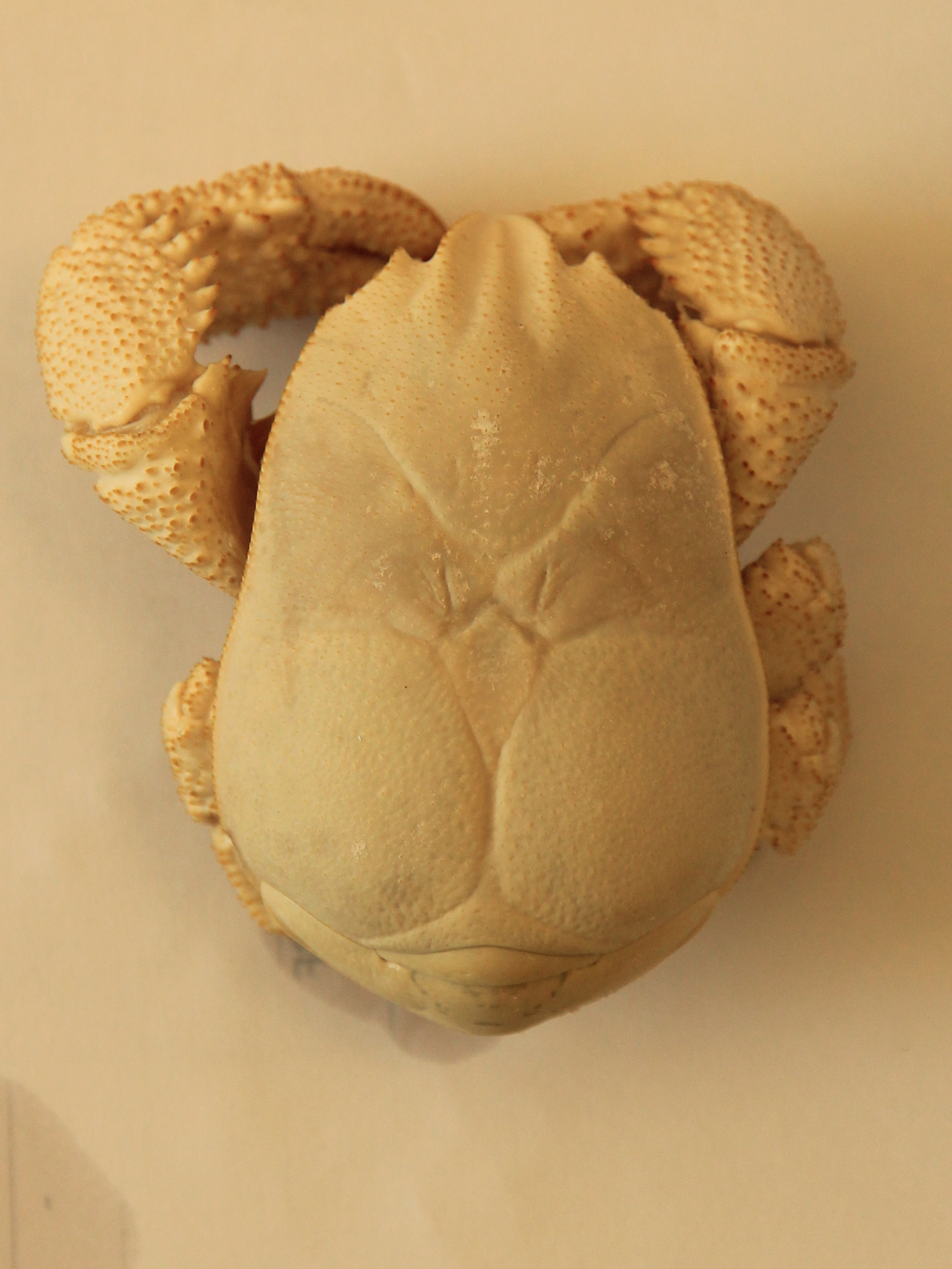
- Dorsal view of carapace showing distinctive markings

Scientific classification
- Kingdom: Animalia
- Phylum: Arthropoda
- Class: Malacostraca
- Order: Decapoda
- Suborder: Pleocyemata
- Infraorder: Anomura
- Family: Kiwaidae
- Genus: Kiwa
- Species: K. tyleri

Binomial name
- Kiwa tyleri Thatje S, Marsh L, Roterman CN, Mavrogordato MN, Linse K, 2015

= Kiwa tyleri =

Species of crustacean

Kiwa tyleri, the Hoff crab, is a species of deep-sea squat lobster in the family Kiwaidae, which lives on hydrothermal vents near Antarctica. The crustacean was given its English nickname in 2010 by UK deep-sea scientists aboard the RRS James Cook, owing to resemblance between its dense covering of setae on the ventral surface of the exoskeleton and the hairy chest of the actor David Hasselhoff. The 2010 expedition to explore hydrothermal vents on the East Scotia Ridge was the second of three expeditions to the Southern Ocean by the UK led research consortium, ChEsSo (Chemosynthetic Ecosystems of the Southern Ocean).

== Distribution ==
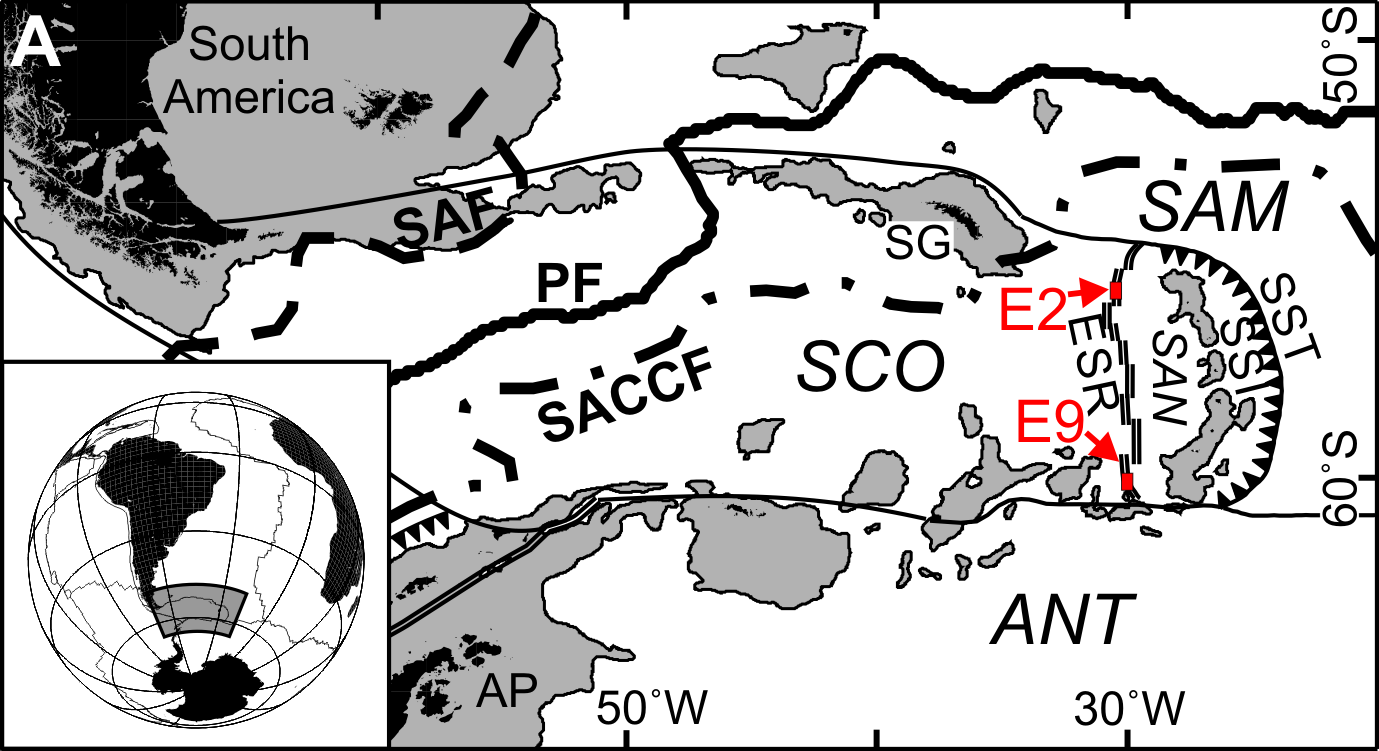
Location of E2 and E9 sites in the Scotia Sea showing the East Scotia Ridge (ESR) between the Scotia Plate (SCO) and South Sandwich Plate (SAN)

This species – the only member of its genus found outside the Pacific Ocean, is known from two sites adjacent to and on the chimney sides of hydrothermal vents in the East Scotia Ridge of the south Atlantic Ocean: from around 2,394 metres (7,854 ft) depth at the E9 vent site and from around 2,608 m (8,556 ft) depth at the E2 site.

== Description ==
Phylogenetic analysis of the mitochondrial 16S ribosomal RNA gene and a range of other anomuran crustaceans, using Bayesian inference, places this species from the East Scotia Ridge as a sister taxon to Kiwa hirsuta, with a sequence divergence from this species of 6.45%, which is consistent for within-genus divergence in squat lobsters.

== Ecology ==
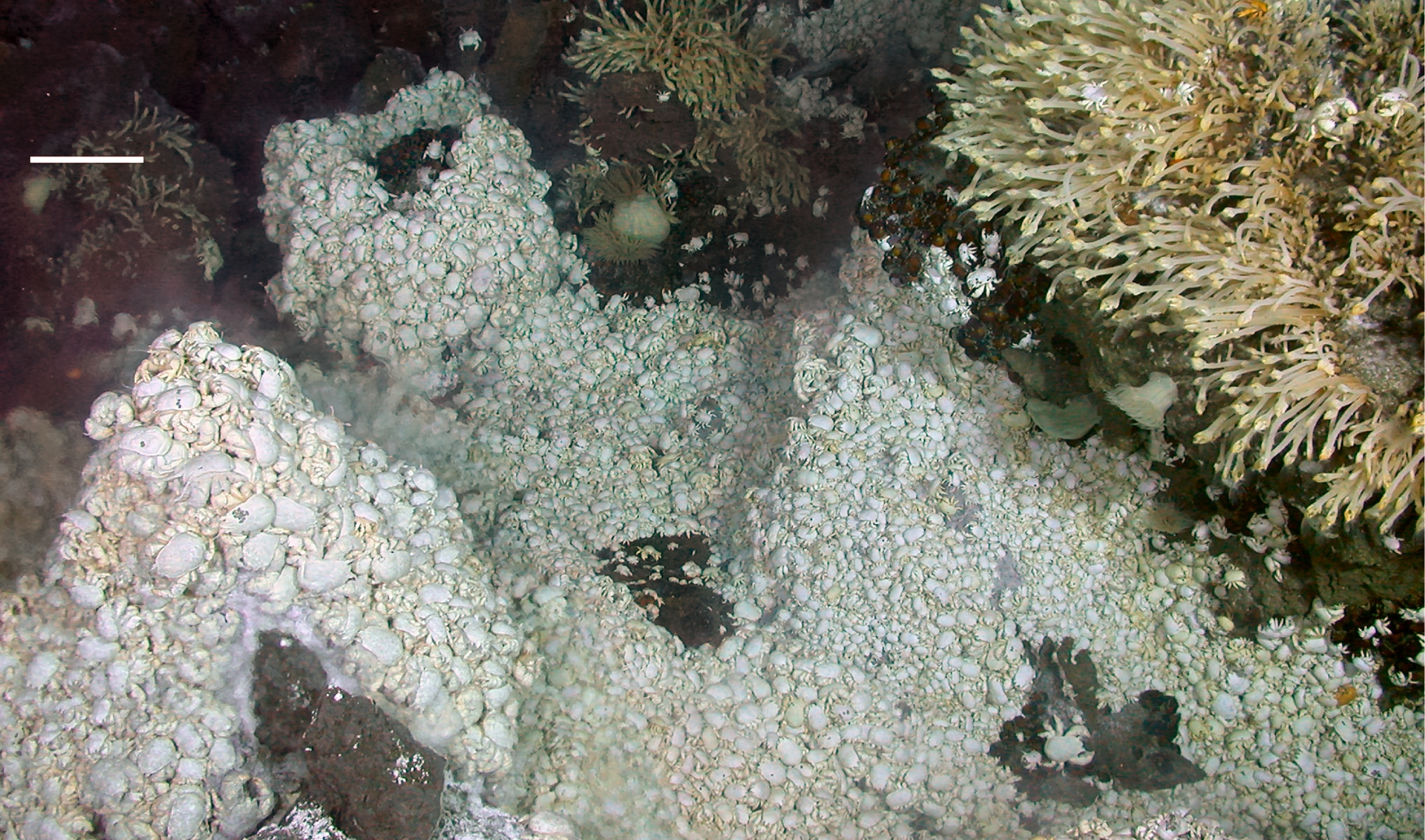
Population of Kiwa around a hydrothermal vent

Unlike Kiwa hirsuta and Kiwa puravida, which are notable for having a dense covering of setae on their elongated chelae, this species has shorter chelae, with most of the setae concentrated instead on the ventral surface of the crab.

Filamentous bacteria were found on the setae and similar-looking sulfur-oxidising bacteria have been found amongst the setae of Kiwa hirsuta and Kiwa puravida. It has been hypothesised that these sulfur-oxidising bacteria, which fix carbon from the water by oxidising sulfides in the hydrothermal fluid, are a significant source of nutrition to the crabs.

The Hoff crabs were found living adjacent to and on the sides of hydrothermal vent chimneys living in close proximity to fluid emanating from the chimneys at temperatures greater than of 350 °C (662 °F). At E9, densities of the crabs were observed in excess of 600 per square metre (56 per square foot).

Small limpets (a new species of Lepetodrilus) are often found on the carapace apparently grazing on bacteria. Other marine fauna, such as sea anemones (family Actinostolidae), gastropods Gigantopelta chessoia, a species of stalked barnacle (most likely of the genus Vulcanolepas), a pycnogonid close to the genus Sericosura, and a predatory seven armed starfish can be found living together with this species.

== Media ==
The "Hoff crab" nickname was widely reported in the media whilst the species still lacked a binomial name, and David Hasselhoff tweeted favourably in response to his "Hoff" moniker being used to describe a hydrothermal vent crab.

The species was later given the binomial name Kiwa tyleri, after its discoverer, Paul Tyler of Southampton University.
