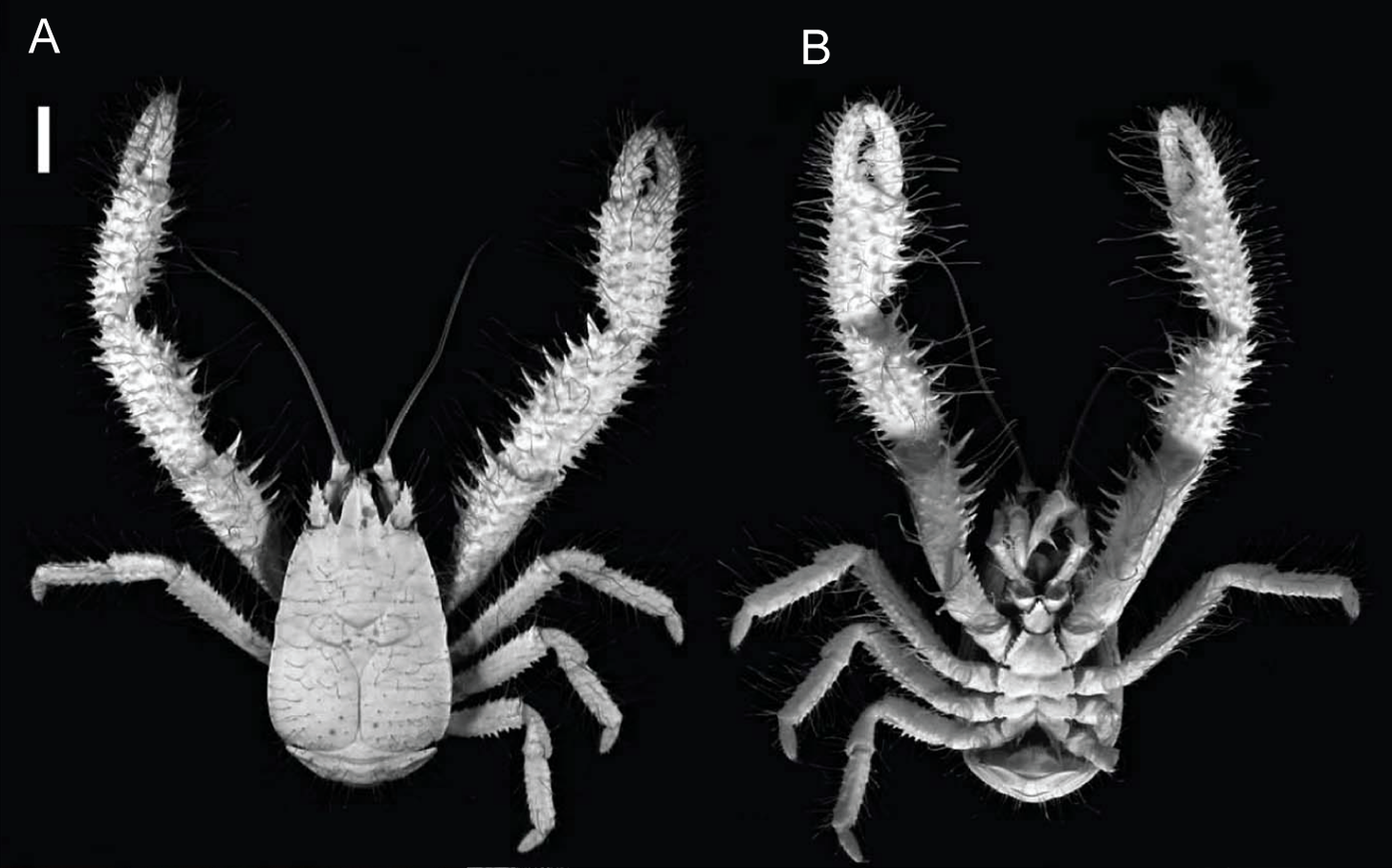

Scientific classification
- Kingdom: Animalia
- Phylum: Arthropoda
- Clade: Pancrustacea
- Class: Malacostraca
- Order: Decapoda
- Suborder: Pleocyemata
- Infraorder: Anomura
- Family: Kiwaidae
- Genus: Kiwa
- Species: K. puravida

Binomial name
- Kiwa puravida Thurber, Jones & Schnabel, 2011

= Kiwa puravida =

Species of crustacean

Kiwa puravida is a species of deep-sea dwelling decapod and a member of the genus Kiwa, a genus of animals that are informally known as yeti crabs, after the mythical, hairy creature. This allusion is due to the long, hair-like structures on their claws. Yeti crabs use these hairs to cultivate symbiotic bacteria on their claws which they feed upon.

== Description ==
The specific epithet puravida (translating to "pure life") comes from a Costa Rican Spanish saying (used to answer "How are you doing?" or to say "Thanks"), a homage to where it was discovered.

The yeti crab is typically found to be less than 6 inches in length, weighing 2-5 pounds. Additionally, they typically live up to 10-20 years.

Kiwa puravida is placed under the "Bristly" clade of Kiwa, along with Kiwa sp. GM, and Kiwa araonae. Fossil records indicate that these crabs originated from hydrothermal vents in the East Pacific 38 to 33 million years ago and experienced rapid radiation 10 to 16 million years ago.

== Distribution ==
Kiwa puravida was discovered living on the 1,000-metre (3,300 ft) deep sea bottom off the coast of Costa Rica in 2006, and was described in 2011. The only other members of its family, Kiwa hirsuta, and the Hoff crab, or Kiwa tyleri, are crabs with similarly hairy claws. Kiwa hirsuta was discovered in 2005 near Easter Island, whereas Kiwa tyleri was discovered near the hydrothermal vents of East Scotia Ridge in 2015.

== Biology ==
The crabs live at deep-sea cold seeps where they feed on symbiotic Pseudomonadota, a bacteria that metabolizes hydrogen sulfide and methane produced by the seeps. These chemicals then get harvested by the animals' comb-like mouthparts. Kiwa puravida has evolved a symbiotic relationship with such bacteria, relying on them as their primary food source. The crabs contain carbon isotopes and different fatty acids within their bodies that obtain nourishment without requiring energy from the sun.

Among the other deep-sea animals that make use of such symbionts, this species is unique in that it actively waves its appendages over the vents in order to provide the bacteria with more oxygen and nutrients. The waving of the claws actively farm this bacteria, as the motion disturbs the water. This in turn ensures that supplies of oxygen and sulfides wash over them, allowing for growth. It is also worth noting that few animals behave in such a way, even though symbiotic behavior is relatively common.

The yeti crab do not have many predators, but they are often targeted by deep-sea octopuses and fish.

=== Reproduction ===
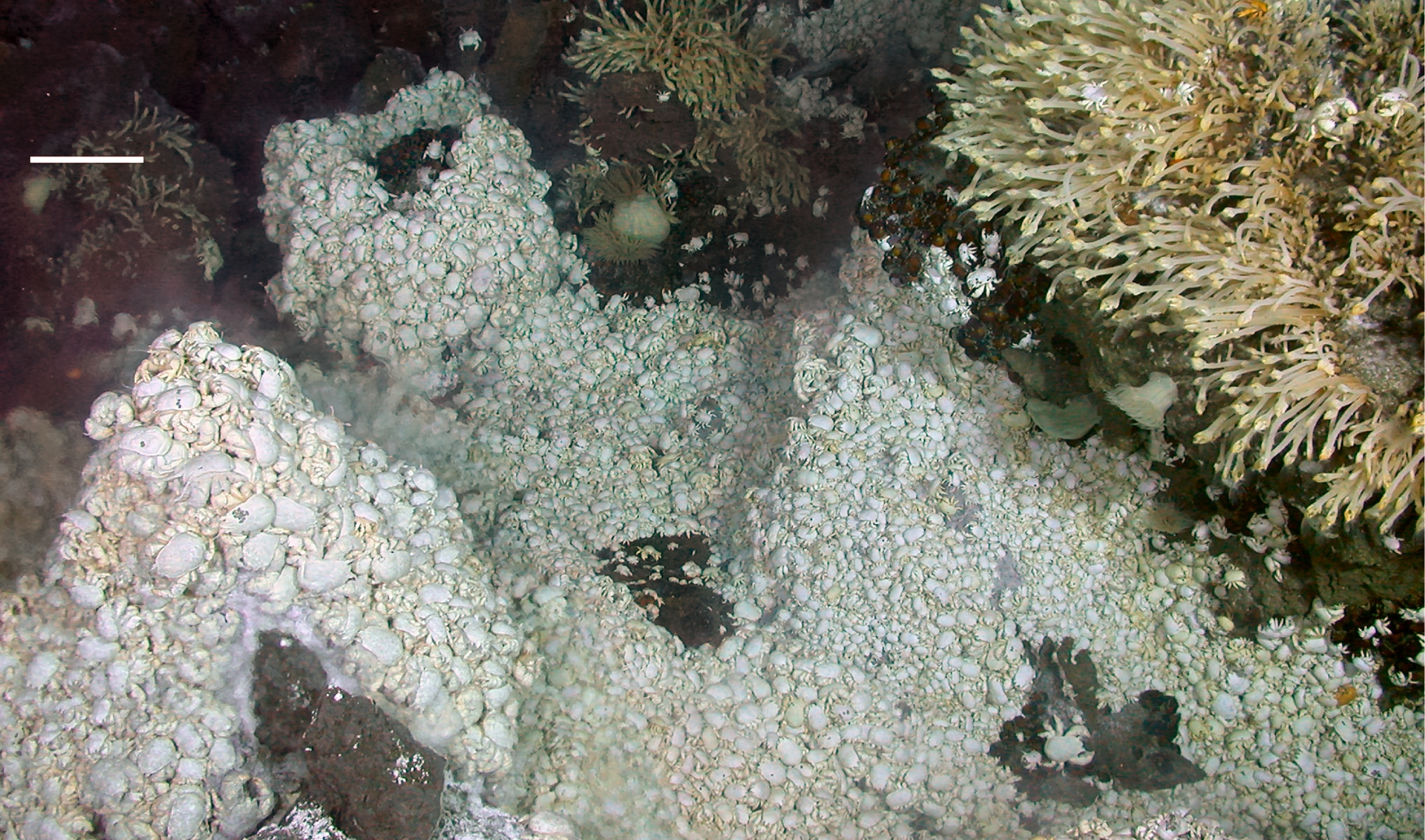
Yeti crabs often cluster at the sea floor.

Compared to their female counterparts, male crabs possess larger claw length and claw width. Additionally, the Kiwa puravida present somewhat symmetric claws between left vs. right in both male and female crabs, with some left claw dominance. This morphological difference between the female and male crabs hints that the size of the claws plays a significant role in sexual selection. Male members of Kiwa puravida have been observed waving their larger claws in order to fight off other individuals of the species. This behavior suggests that the sexual dimorphism between the female and male members of Kiwa puravida is due to the reliance on male-male competition during mating.

Yeti crabs 'dance' by swinging their claws around to harvest symbiotic bacteria.

However, unlike the Kiwa tyleri, the female and male members of Kiwa puravida do not have notable differences in the growth rates of their claws. This suggests that the Kiwa puravida does not experience the same pressure of sexual selection experienced by the Kiwa tyleri.
