= Australopoda =

Scientific classification
- Domain: Eukaryota
- Kingdom: Animalia
- Phylum: Arthropoda
- Class: Malacostraca
- Order: Decapoda
- Suborder: Pleocyemata
- (unranked): Reptantia
- Infraorder: Anomura
- Clade: Australopoda; Keiler, Richter & Wirkner, 2016

Superfamilies
- Aegloidea; Chirostyloidea; Lomisoidea

Clade of crustaceans

Australopoda is a taxon within Anomura. This monophyletic group comprises Lomisoidea, Aegloidea and Chirostyloidea.
