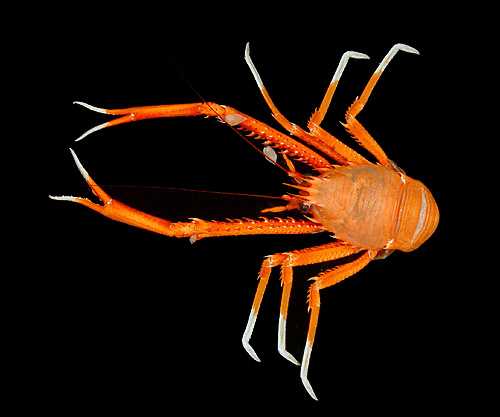

Scientific classification
- Kingdom: Animalia
- Phylum: Arthropoda
- Class: Malacostraca
- Order: Decapoda
- Suborder: Pleocyemata
- Infraorder: Anomura
- Family: Eumunididae
- Genus: Eumunida
- Species: E. picta

Binomial name
- Eumunida picta S. I. Smith, 1883

= Eumunida picta =

Species of crustacean

Eumunida picta is a species of squat lobster found in the deep sea. The species is strongly associated with reefs of Lophelia pertusa, a deep-water coral, and with methane seeps. It is abundant in the western Atlantic Ocean, where it is found from Massachusetts to Colombia.

== Description ==
Eumunida picta has a shrimp-like body, the carapace being about as wide as it is long, tapering at the front to the long rostrum. There are five spines on the rostrum above the eye and other spines on the sides of the carapace. The chelipeds are long and slender, about four times as long as the carapace. The pereiopods are also elongated and both are armed with many spines. This squat lobster is an orange-red colour with white-tipped legs and chelae, pinkish lateral carapace spines and a paler ventral surface.

== Distribution and habitat ==
The species is found in the Western Atlantic Ocean, the Caribbean Sea and the Gulf of Mexico. It lives in deep water, often in association with cold seeps and with the coldwater coral Lophelia pertusa.

== Ecology ==
A predator and omnivore, E. picta perches on a coral or stone waiting for small fish or other prey to come within range. Its colouring provides cryptic camouflage when it is among the fronds of L. pertusa. It also feeds on diatoms, foraminiferans, radiolarians, copepods, arrow worms and marine snow.

In one study, while observing the seabed with a remotely operated underwater vehicle, researchers found this squat lobster in association with the coral at a wreck site in the Gulf of Mexico at a depth of about 550 m (1,804 ft). When not in contact with L. pertusa, it was usually within a metre (3 feet) of it. The decapod may stay in proximity to the coral because its fronds are an ideal feeding location, provide a refuge from predators, or offer some other benefit.
