= May Golan =

Israeli politician (born 1986)

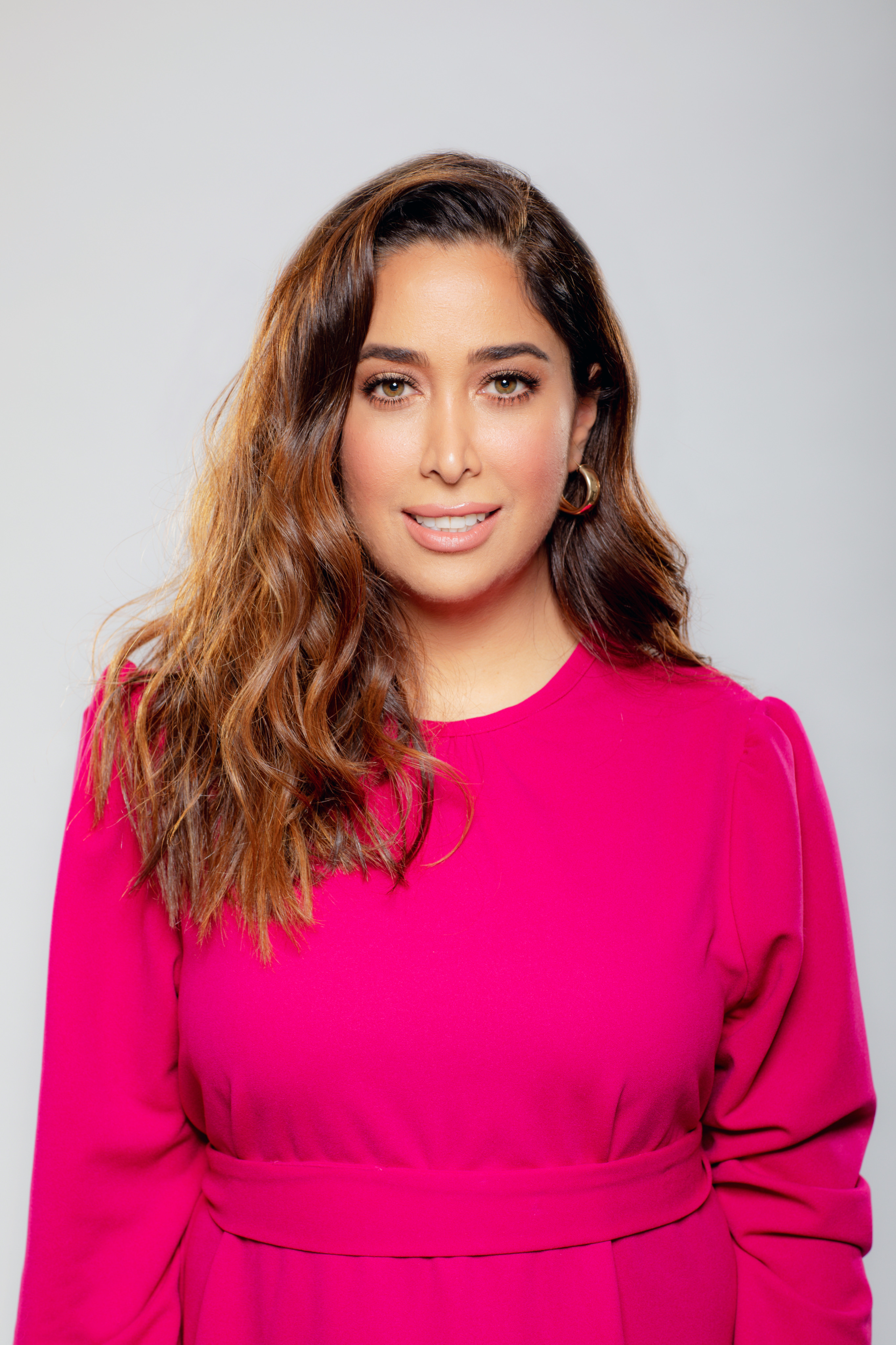
- Golan in 2023

Ministerial roles
- 2023–: Minister for Women's Empowerment
- 2024–: Minister for Social Equality

Faction represented in the Knesset
- 2019: Likud
- 2020–2026: Likud

Personal details
- Born: Flora May Bedra-Golan; 3 May 1986 (age 40) Tel Aviv, Israel
- Party: Likud (since 2015)
- Other political affiliations: Otzma LeYisrael (2013–2015)

Flora May Bedra-Golan (Hebrew: פלורה מאי בדרה-גולן; born 3 May 1986) is an Israeli politician who is the Minister for Social Equality and Minister for Women's Empowerment. She was elected to the Knesset for Likud in the 2022 elections.

She was formerly the CEO of the NGO Hebrew City, and also worked as a campaigner against illegal immigration.

== Biography ==
Flora May Bedra-Golan was born in Tel Aviv, Israel. She is the child of a single Orthodox Jewish mother who immigrated from Iraq as a three-year-old girl as part of Operation Ezra and Nehemiah. She grew up near the old central bus station in South Tel Aviv. As of 2019, she was still living in South Tel Aviv, with her mother, previously on Mount Zion Street and today in Kfar Shalem.

At the age of 9, Golan was interviewed with her mother as part of a Channel One report on poverty in Israel. They were living on social security in a low-class neighborhood in South Tel Aviv. Following the broadcast, May was contacted by Gila Almagor and her Wish Foundation charity. Identified as a child with potential, she was invited to attend Ironi Dalet High School, located in North Tel Aviv, a higher socioeconomic neighborhood.

== Political career ==
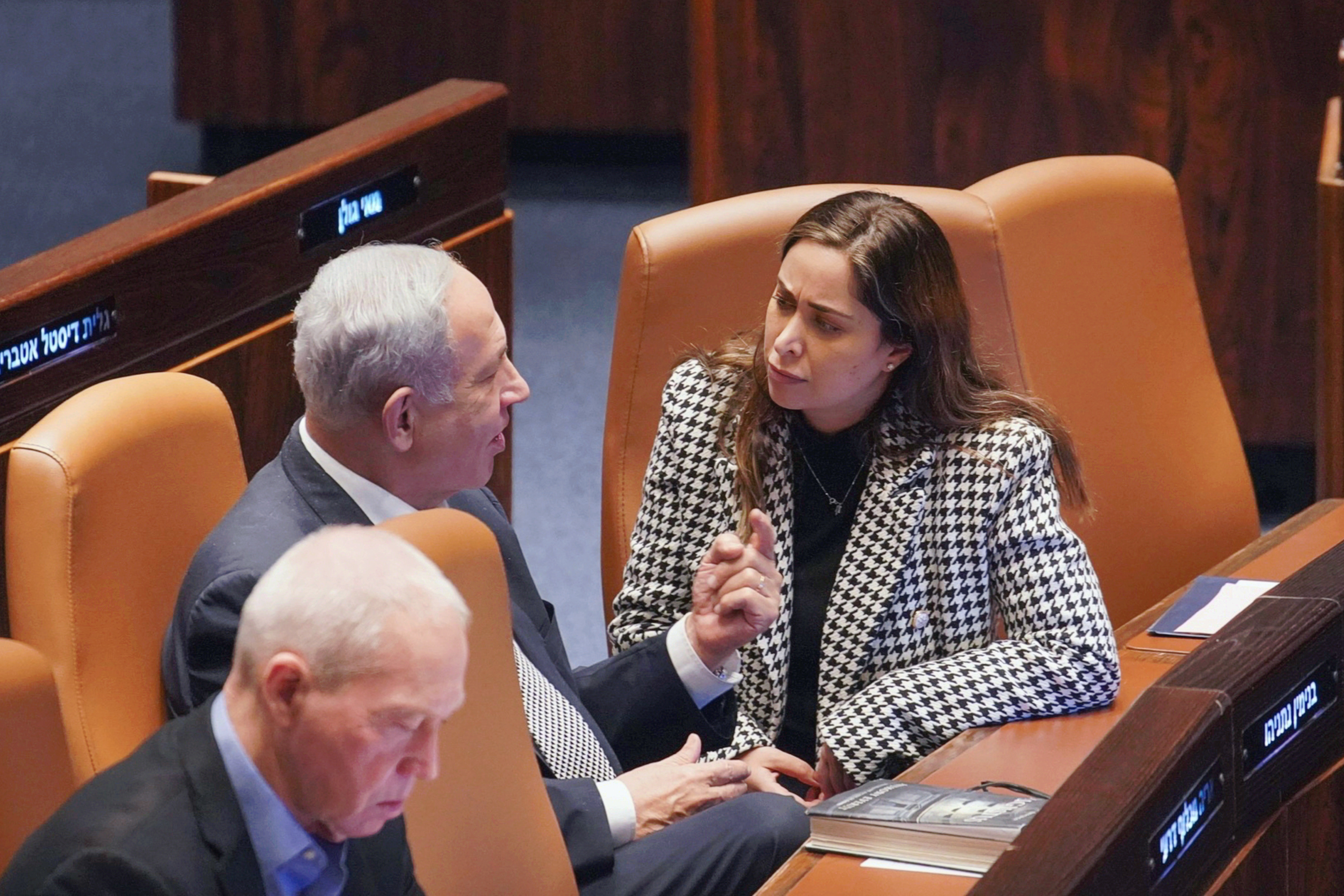
Golan with Prime Minister Benjamin Netanyahu and Defense Minister Yoav Galant, 23 January 2023

Golan became politically active in 2011, campaigning to raise awareness about the impact of undocumented immigrants from Africa on south Tel Aviv. She became a highly recognisable face in the campaign against the presence of undocumented immigrants in Tel Aviv.

In 2013, she established the organization "Hebrew city", which stood for election to the Tel Aviv city council, but was disqualified for technical reasons.

In the 2013 Israeli legislative election, she was placed at the 10th place candidate for the Otzma Leyisrael party, however the party won no seats due to their failure to pass the election threshold. In the 2015 elections for the 20th Knesset, she was placed 32nd as a candidate for the Likud party, which ultimately went on to receive the highest number of votes.

In April 2023, prime minister of Israel Benjamin Netanyahu nominated May Golan as a consul general to New York. This appointment did not come to fruition due to the opposition of elements in the American government about Golan's past statements regarding African refugees in Israel, which were defined as racist.

In October 2024, Golan spoke at a rally advocating for the establishment of Jewish settlements in the Gaza Strip. Golan called for the relocation of Palestinians in Gaza, saying that there should be "another Nakba" in retaliation for the October 7 attacks on Israel.

== Media appearances ==
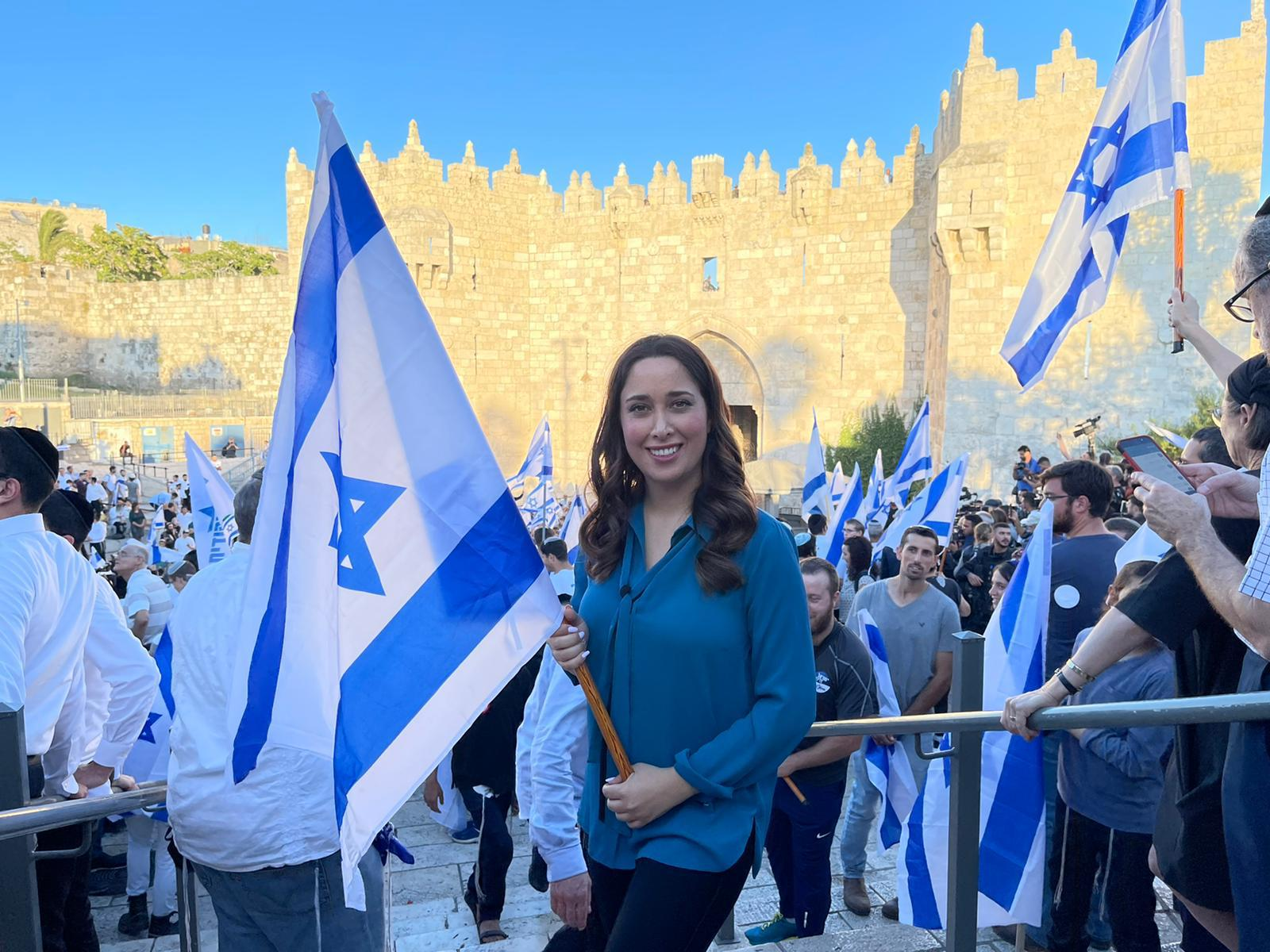
May Golan in Jerusalem, 15 June 2021

May Golan has been a frequent guest on political panels on Israeli television and has appeared on international networks, including the BBC, Reuters, Fox News, i24News, and RTVI.

In 2014, she was named one of "66 Israeli Women You Should Know" by Haaretz for Israel's 66th Independence Day. In 2015, she was selected as "Woman of the Year" in the social field by Arutz Sheva (Channel 7).

In July 2022, the social media platform TikTok removed one of her videos about violence in South Tel Aviv, citing incitement to racism.

In January 2025, Golan came under scrutiny for allegedly evading police questioning regarding a 2020 traffic incident in which she was accused of running a red light and injuring a motorcyclist. The incident resurfaced in the media after it was revealed that she had avoided police summons for over six months. Her legal counsel later confirmed she would cooperate with authorities.

In July 2025, during an interview with British broadcaster Piers Morgan, Golan stated that she was aware of the number of Hamas militants killed in Gaza but declined to provide figures, citing "governmental reasons." Her remarks drew public and media criticism for their lack of transparency and sensitivity, particularly in the context of rising civilian casualties.

== Controversy ==
Golan has attracted international attention for her vocal support of Donald Trump, and incendiary remarks about African immigration to Israel. When she was accused of racism at protest rallies in her early days as an activist, she was quoted as saying: “If I’m racist in order to preserve my life, I'm proud to be racist.”

In 2013 at a political rally of the Jewish Power party she reiterated, "If I am racist for wanting to defend my country and for wanting to protect my basic rights and security, then I’m a proud racist."

In 2023, a group of former Israeli ambassadors said they were shocked by the appointment of Golan as Israel's new women's advancement minister, saying that "Golan’s appointment is outrageous as she is a racist and divisive figure, which is the exact opposite from what Israel needs in such a critical place."

In October 2023, Golan stated during an Israeli cabinet meeting that "All of Gaza’s infrastructure must be destroyed to its foundation and their electricity cut off immediately. The war is not against Hamas but against the state of Gaza."

In February 2024, Golan made a speech in the Knesset during the Gaza war, in which she said: "I am personally proud of the ruins of Gaza, and that every baby, even 80 years from now, will tell their grandchildren what the Jews did when they murdered their families, raped them and kidnapped their citizens! Neither a dove nor an olive leaf, only a sword – to cut off Sinwar's head!"

As Minister for Women's Empowerment (later Minister for Social Equality and Women’s Advancement), Golan received backlash from feminist and women’s advocacy groups. Critics highlighted her voting record opposing key legislation aimed at enhancing gender-based protections—including bills mandating electronic monitoring of domestic violence offenders and standardizing retention of sexual assault evidence kits.

In May 2026, Gilad Kariv, a Reform rabbi and member of the Knesset, criticized Golan for securing a Likud Party salary for Rafi Kedoshim, a convicted felon. In response, Golan accused Kariv of marrying dogs in "delusional synagogues", an apparent reference to the Reform Jewish movement. Kariv accused Golan of antisemitism, while Yechiel Leiter, the Israeli ambassador to the United States, apologized to the American Reform Jewish movement for Golan's remarks.

== Legal investigations ==
In early 2025, Golan became the subject of public and legal scrutiny following a series of investigative reports alleging financial and administrative misconduct.

In February 2025, Attorney General Gali Baharav-Miara and State Attorney Amit Aisman authorized a police investigation into Golan after a Channel 12 report alleged that she employed associates and family members in publicly funded roles within her Knesset office and misused parliamentary aides for personal errands, including shopping and chauffeuring her mother.

The report also raised concerns regarding Hebrew City, the nonprofit she formerly led, which reportedly solicited large donations—including $78,000 and $20,000 from the Taiwanese embassy—without filing proper financial disclosures for multiple years.

On 18 July 2025, the Attorney General and State Attorney ordered a full criminal investigation by the National Fraud Investigation Unit into suspicions of bribery, fraud, and breach of trust relating to both her nonprofit activity and public office appointments.

Israeli police "raided" Golan's Jerusalem office on 15 September. The same day, a lawyer close to Golan was arrested, while several of her colleagues were detained.

Golan's mother had been questioned at a police station in Tel Aviv on 18 September, after several days of the police attempting to locate her, though May Golan took her away. She returned the next day and completed the questioning.

The police called for Golan's prosecution and "transferred the case to the State Attorney's Office" in June 2026.
