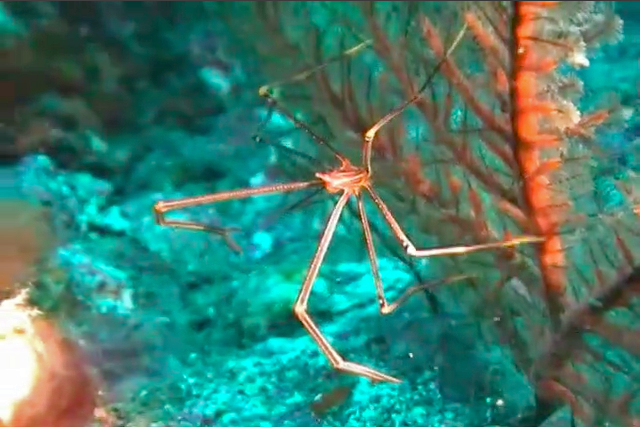

Scientific classification
- Domain: Eukaryota
- Kingdom: Animalia
- Phylum: Arthropoda
- Class: Malacostraca
- Order: Decapoda
- Suborder: Pleocyemata
- Infraorder: Anomura
- Family: Chirostylidae
- Genus: Chirostylus; Ortmann, 1892

= Chirostylus =

Genus of crustaceans

Chirostylus is a genus of squat lobsters in the family Chirostylidae, containing the following species:

- Chirostylus dolichopus Ortmann, 1892
- Chirostylus micheleae Tirmizi & Khan, 1979
- Chirostylus novaecaledoniae Baba, 1991
- Chirostylus ortmanni Miyake & Baba, 1968
- Chirostylus rostratus Osawa & Nishikiori, 1998
- Chirostylus sandyi Baba, 2009
- Chirostylus stellaris Osawa, 2007
