= Gastroptychus =

Scientific classification
- Domain: Eukaryota
- Kingdom: Animalia
- Phylum: Arthropoda
- Class: Malacostraca
- Order: Decapoda
- Suborder: Pleocyemata
- Infraorder: Anomura
- Family: Chirostylidae
- Genus: Gastroptychus; Caullery, 1896

Genus of squat lobsters

Gastroptychus is a genus of squat lobsters in the family Chirostylidae, containing the following species:

- Gastroptychus affinis (Chace, 1942)
- Gastroptychus brachyterus Baba, 2005
- Gastroptychus brevipropodus Baba, 1991
- Gastroptychus laevis (Henderson, 1885)
- Gastroptychus novaezelandiae Baba, 1974
- Gastroptychus paucispina Baba, 1991
- Gastroptychus spinifer (A. Milne Edwards, 1880)
- Gastroptychus sternoornatus (Van Dam, 1933)
- Gastroptychus valdiviae (Balss, 1913)
