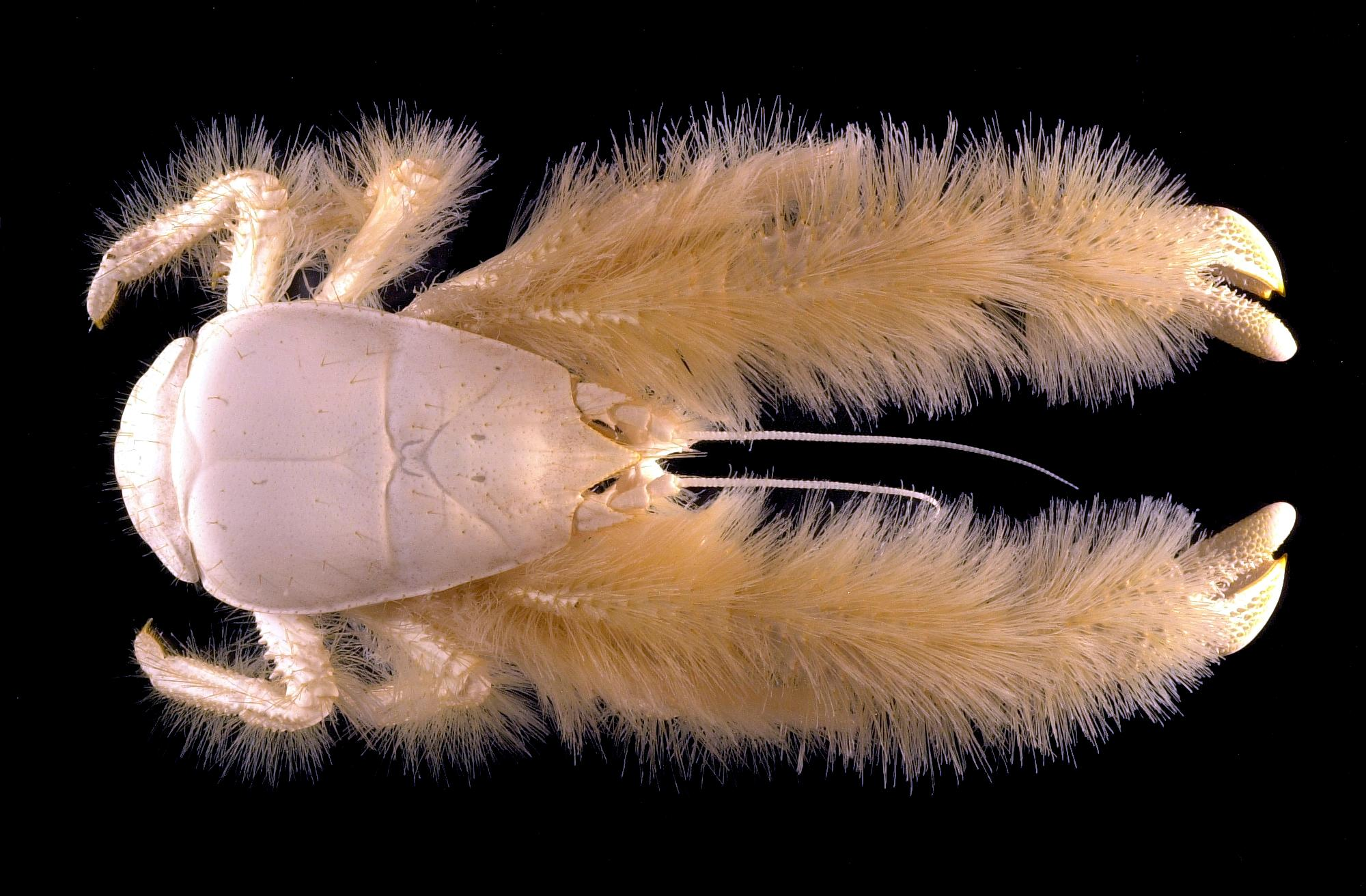
- Kiwa hirsuta

Scientific classification
- Kingdom: Animalia
- Phylum: Arthropoda
- Class: Malacostraca
- Order: Decapoda
- Suborder: Pleocyemata
- Infraorder: Anomura
- Superfamily: Chirostyloidea
- Family: Kiwaidae; Macpherson, Jones & Segonzac, 2006
- Genus: Kiwa; Macpherson, Jones & Segonzac, 2006

= Kiwa (crustacean) =

Genus of crustaceans

Kiwa is a genus of marine decapods living at deep-sea hydrothermal vents and cold seeps. The animals are commonly referred to as yeti lobsters or yeti crabs, after the legendary yeti, because of their "hairy" and bristly appearance. The genus is placed in its own family, Kiwaidae, in the superfamily Chirostyloidea.

Based on the presence of sulphur-oxidising bacteria on the "hairs" (properly known as setae) of both K. hirsuta and the new South West Indian Ridge species, they may both feed on bacteria in addition to scavenging. Some of these bacteria are found in the bristles of their claws, which are believed to have been cultivated intentionally for consumption. For K. puravida, the bacteria have been identified and the feeding behaviour observed, as well as a cyclical rhythmic motion of the crab documented that is suspected to increase the flow of methane and hydrogen sulfide, the bacterial food, towards the bacteria. The two sexes of the unnamed South West Indian Ridge species prefer different temperatures, with males seeming to prefer warmer water and egg-carrying females and juveniles preferring the coldest.

Because yeti crabs live in extreme environments like cold seeps and hydrothermal vents, the species has adapted certain behaviors and qualities to aid their survival. These adaptations include the growth of setae, propodus, and claws.

== Taxonomy ==
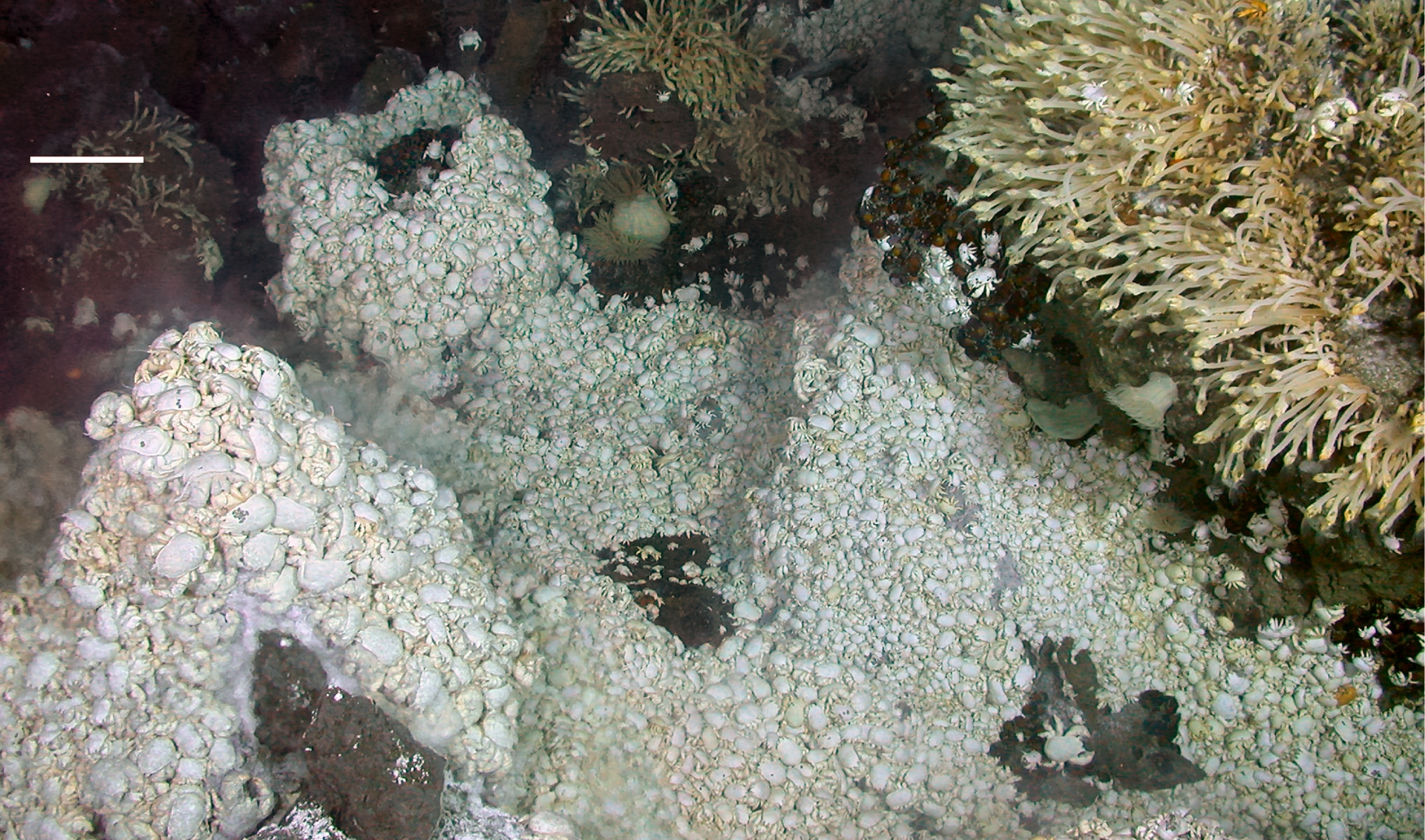
Population of Kiwa around a hydrothermal vent

The yeti crabs belong to the genus Kiwa, which is the only genus in the family Kiwaidae. The genus is named for Kiwa, the god of shellfish in Polynesian mythology. The species are distributed across different locations.

- Kiwa hirsuta discovered in 2005 on the Pacific-Antarctic Ridge,
- Kiwa puravida discovered in 2006 at cold seeps in the East Pacific (all other species are from hydrothermal vents),
- Kiwa tyleri, known colloquially as the "Hoff crab", from the East Scotia Ridge,
- Kiwa araonae from the Australian-Antarctic Ridge.

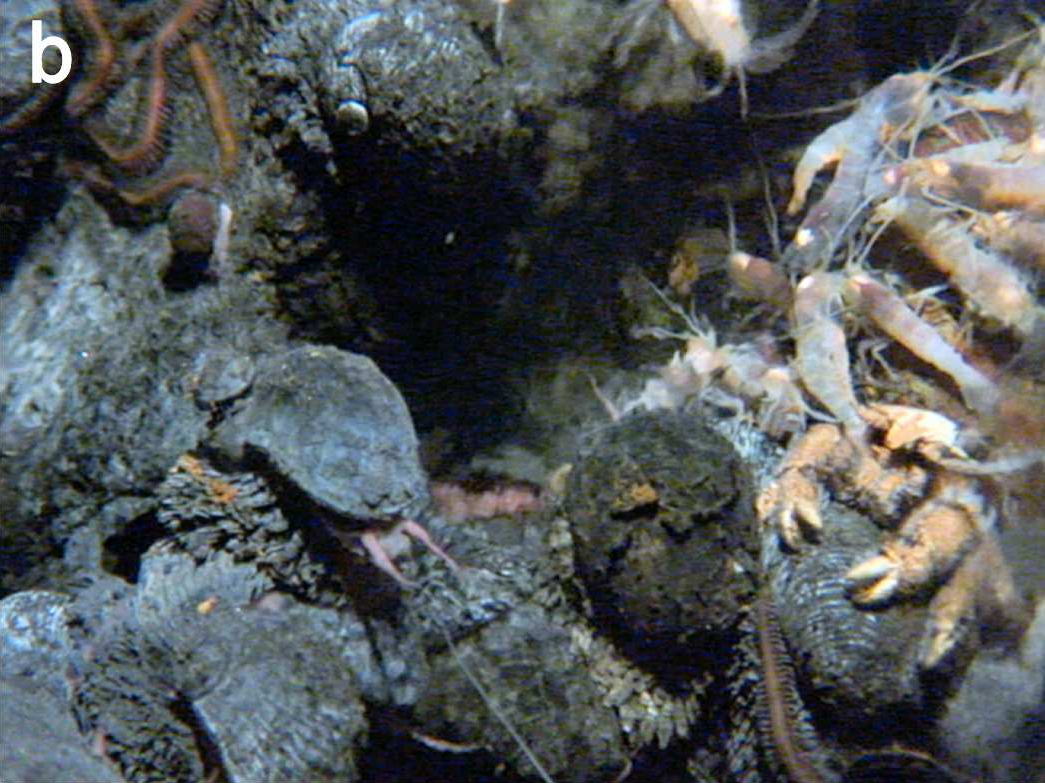
Kiwa sp. SWIR next to scaly-foot iron snail (Chrysomallon squamiferum)

Two similar but undescribed species are known from vents on the South West Indian Ridge and at the Galápagos respectively. The third undescribed species of Kiwa was discovered in 2010 in the Atlantic sector of the Southern Ocean at vents on the East Scotia Ridge. Compared with the first two species, it has proportionally shorter chelae, with the majority of the bacteria-growing setae concentrated on the ventral carapace.

Analysis of DNA has confirmed the distinction of the different species, having diverged from each other millions of years ago. K. araonae and K. puravida are considered to be closely related despite being found 12,000 kilometers apart, based on morphological and molecular phylogenetic evidence. Research of fossils around the Eocene-Oligocene boundary in the eastern Pacific suggests a decrease in deep temperatures and increased ventilation in each habitat may have influenced species divergence. Likewise, fossils found in the mid-Miocene (located in the tropical East Pacific), indicate that the evolution of one species of yeti crab, K. puravida, may coincide with lower deep-sea temperatures.

== Biology ==
=== Feeding ===
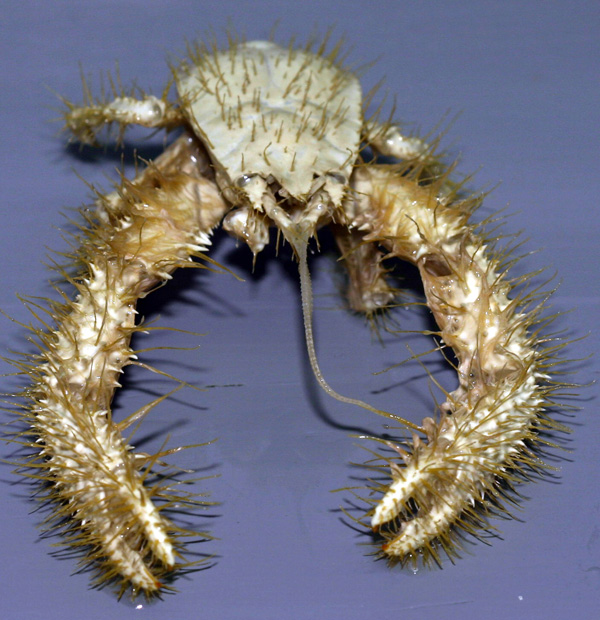
The main dietary source of yeti crabs, symbiotic bacteria, reside on the hair-like setae on the clawed appendage.

Kiwa crustaceans play a crucial role in the deep-sea ecosystem, serving as primary consumers and contributing to the biodiversity within hydrothermal vent communities. The absence of sunlight at hydrothermal vents poses a challenge to how vent species obtain the energy required to sustain life. Since sunlight cannot provide the necessary fatty acids and carbon isotopes necessary for their survival, yeti crabs rely solely on symbiotic bacteria as their main food source. Yeti crabs feed on chemosynthetic bacteria that reside on hair-like setae on the outer appendages of the crustacean. Other organisms, such as Shinkaia crosnieri and Rimicaris exoculata, exhibit similar dietary patterns as the yeti crab.

Scientists have observed that K. puravida have a unique approach when it comes to farming food. This method has made the species become known as the "dancing crab". Yeti crabs have been observed waving their claws around near cold seeps, which makes them appear as if they are dancing. This dance is actually a form of farming for the species. By waving their claws around, the crab stirs up water around the symbiotic bacteria living in the setae on their claws. This ensures the bacteria are receiving enough chemicals that will provide energy to grow. By growing their own food, the yeti crab has a readily available resource of food in the harsh environment of the deep sea.

=== Reproduction ===
Little is known about the mating behavior between yeti crabs, with most knowledge coming from the study of K. puravida. Scientists have found that male crabs exhibit larger claws than females, suggesting that antagonistic interactions may occur between males competing for a female mate. This resembles a precopulatory guarding type mating system, which describes a set of mating behaviors found in decapods which consists of long interactions between a set of mates and higher levels of aggression in males. In another species, K. tyleri, males were observed to be found in groups closest to hydrothermal vents, while females were seen further away from these dense areas. This may be because egg-bearing females need to escape the high levels of heat near vents and move to a colder area in order to protect the development of their eggs.

== Adaptations ==
One adaptation of the yeti crab species is the growth of its setae to farm bacteria in the species K. puravida. There is some variation regarding the different types and various states of setae. Two different types of setae are organized adjacent to one another. Rows of narrow and flexible setae enclose the rows of more restricted, thicker setae. Because females slightly deviate from the vent environment during egg fertilization and larval development, brooding females contain more deteriorated, brown setae, as a result of their reduced carapace health away from the vent environment.

An additional adaptation found in the species K. tyleri is the formation of a spine on the propodus (the end of the crab leg). This is beneficial for yeti crabs because they help the crustacean to cling to the steep chimneys of hydrothermal vents. The stout, compact build of the crab also helps it traverse hydrothermal vent environments.

Scientists have found that male yeti crabs have larger claws than females, which may indicate that bigger claws are sexually selected for reproductive advantages. Previous research has suggested the claws are a mechanism of protection as scientists observed yeti crabs fighting with their claws or waving their claws to fend off predators. Bigger claws may also provide a better fitness advantage because they provide more surface area for symbiotic bacterial farming.
