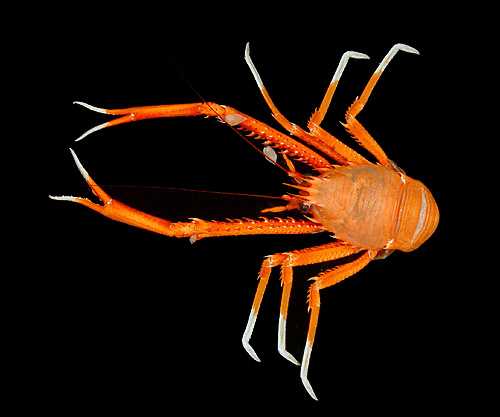
- Eumunida picta

Scientific classification
- Domain: Eukaryota
- Kingdom: Animalia
- Phylum: Arthropoda
- Class: Malacostraca
- Order: Decapoda
- Suborder: Pleocyemata
- Infraorder: Anomura
- Family: Eumunididae
- Genus: Eumunida; S. I. Smith, 1883

Type species
- Eumunida picta

= Eumunida =

Genus of crustaceans

Eumunida is a genus of squat lobsters. The majority of its species are from the Pacific Ocean and are as follows:

- Eumunida ampliata de Saint Laurent & Poupin, 1996
- Eumunida annulosa de Saint Laurent & Macpherson, 1990
- Eumunida australis de Saint Laurent & Macpherson, 1990
- Eumunida balssi Gordon, 1930
- Eumunida balteipes Osawa & Higashiji, 2019
- Eumunida bella de Saint Laurent & Macpherson, 1990
- Eumunida bispinata Baba, 1990
- Eumunida capillata de Saint Laurent & Macpherson, 1990
- Eumunida chani Baba & Lin, 2008
- Eumunida debilistriata Baba, 1977
- Eumunida depressa de Saint Laurent & Poupin, 1996
- Eumunida dofleini Gordon, 1930
- Eumunida funambulus Gordon, 1930
- Eumunida gordonae Baba, 1976
- Eumunida keijii de Saint Laurent & Macpherson, 1990
- Eumunida laevimana Gordon, 1930
- Eumunida macphersoni de Saint Laurent & Poupin, 1996
- Eumunida marginata de Saint Laurent & Macpherson, 1990
- Eumunida minor de Saint Laurent & Macpherson, 1990
- Eumunida multilineata de Saint Laurent & Poupin, 1996
- Eumunida multispina Komai, Chakraborty, Paramasivam & Gidda, 2019
- Eumunida nikko Komai & Tsuchida, 2014
- Eumunida notialis Tavares & Lima, 2019
- Eumunida pacifica Gordon, 1930
- Eumunida picta Smith, 1883
- Eumunida similior Baba, 1990
- Eumunida smithii Henderson, 1885
- Eumunida spinosa Macpherson, 2006
- Eumunida spiridonovi Macpherson, Rodríguez-Flores & Machordom, 2017
- Eumunida squamifera de Saint Laurent & Macpherson, 1990
- Eumunida sternomaculata de Saint Laurent & Macpherson, 1990
- Eumunida subsolanus Baba & Wicksten, 2019
- Eumunida treguieri de Saint Laurent & Poupin, 1996
- Eumunida turbulenta Macpherson, Rodríguez-Flores & Machordom, 2020
