= Hapaloptyx =

Scientific classification
- Domain: Eukaryota
- Kingdom: Animalia
- Phylum: Arthropoda
- Class: Malacostraca
- Order: Decapoda
- Suborder: Pleocyemata
- Infraorder: Anomura
- Family: Chirostylidae
- Genus: Hapaloptyx; Stebbing, 1920
- Species: H. difficilis

Binomial name
- Hapaloptyx difficilis Stebbing, 1920

Genus of crustaceans

Hapaloptyx difficilis is a species of squat lobster in the monotypic genus Hapaloptyx in the family Chirostylidae.
