= Uri Orbach =

Israeli politician (1960–2015)

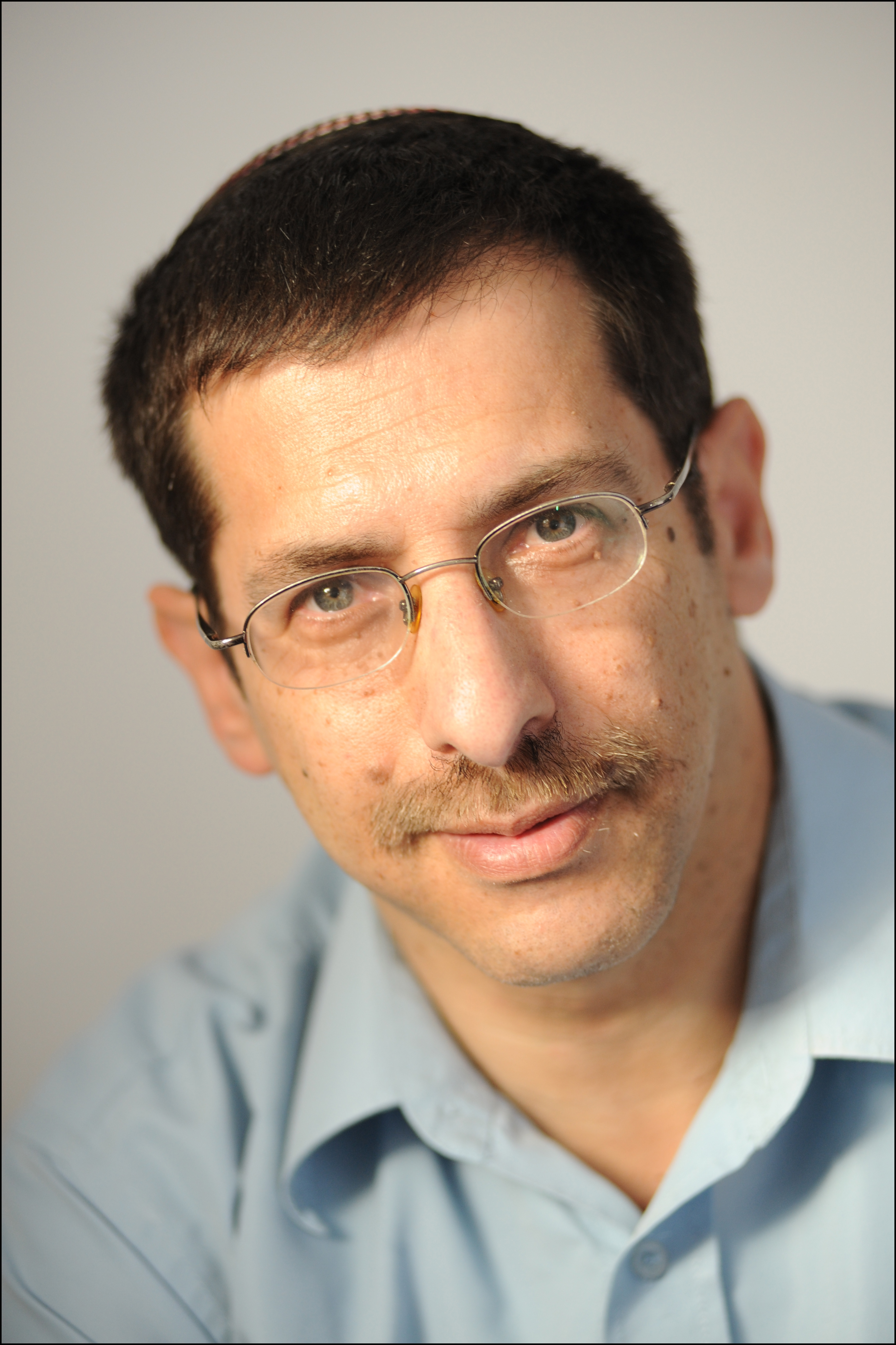
- Orbach in 2010

Ministerial roles
- 2013–2015: Minister of Pensioner Affairs

Faction represented in the Knesset
- 2009–2015: The Jewish Home

Personal details
- Born: 28 March 1960 Petah Tikva, Israel
- Died: 16 February 2015 (aged 54) Jerusalem, Israel

Uri Shraga Orbach (Hebrew: אורי שרגא אורבך; 28 March 1960 – 16 February 2015) was an Israeli Religious Zionist writer, journalist, and politician. He served as a member of the Knesset for the Jewish Home party, and as Minister of Pensioner Affairs.

== Biography ==
Orbach was born in Petah Tikva, Israel. He attended a Hesder yeshiva and did his national service in Israel Defense Forces in the IDF Armored Corps, where he served as a staff sergeant. He later worked as a journalist, producing columns for Yedioth Ahronoth and serving as a co-host for the Army Radio mid-morning show The Last Word. He also wrote several children's books, including Donkeys on the Roof and Other Stories, and a dictionary of Religious Zionist slang, My Grandfather Was a Rabbi, as well as founding and editing the children's magazines Otiot and Sukariot.

Prior to the 2009 elections he joined the Jewish Home. Following a split in the party, in which several members left to re-establish the National Union party, he was placed third on the party's list, and entered the Knesset as it won three seats. For the 2013 elections he was placed sixth on the Jewish Home list, retaining his seat as the party won 12 seats. He was appointed Minister of Pensioner Affairs on 18 March 2013.

== Personal life ==
Orbach lived in Modi'in-Maccabim-Re'ut with his wife and four children.

In January 2015 he took a leave of absence from politics for health reasons, to battle a chronic hematologic disease. In February 2015 his condition took a turn for the worse and he died in the Shaare Zedek Medical Center in Jerusalem on 16 February 2015. His seat in the Knesset was taken by Hillel Horowitz.

== Legacy ==
The Uri Orbach Prize for Jewish Culture awarded by the Israeli Minister of Education was created in his memory. Recipients have included: singer Shlomo Bar, Rabbi Yoel Bin-Nun, artist Chani Cohen Zada, singer Maureen Nehedar, dance teacher Tzipi Nir and others.
