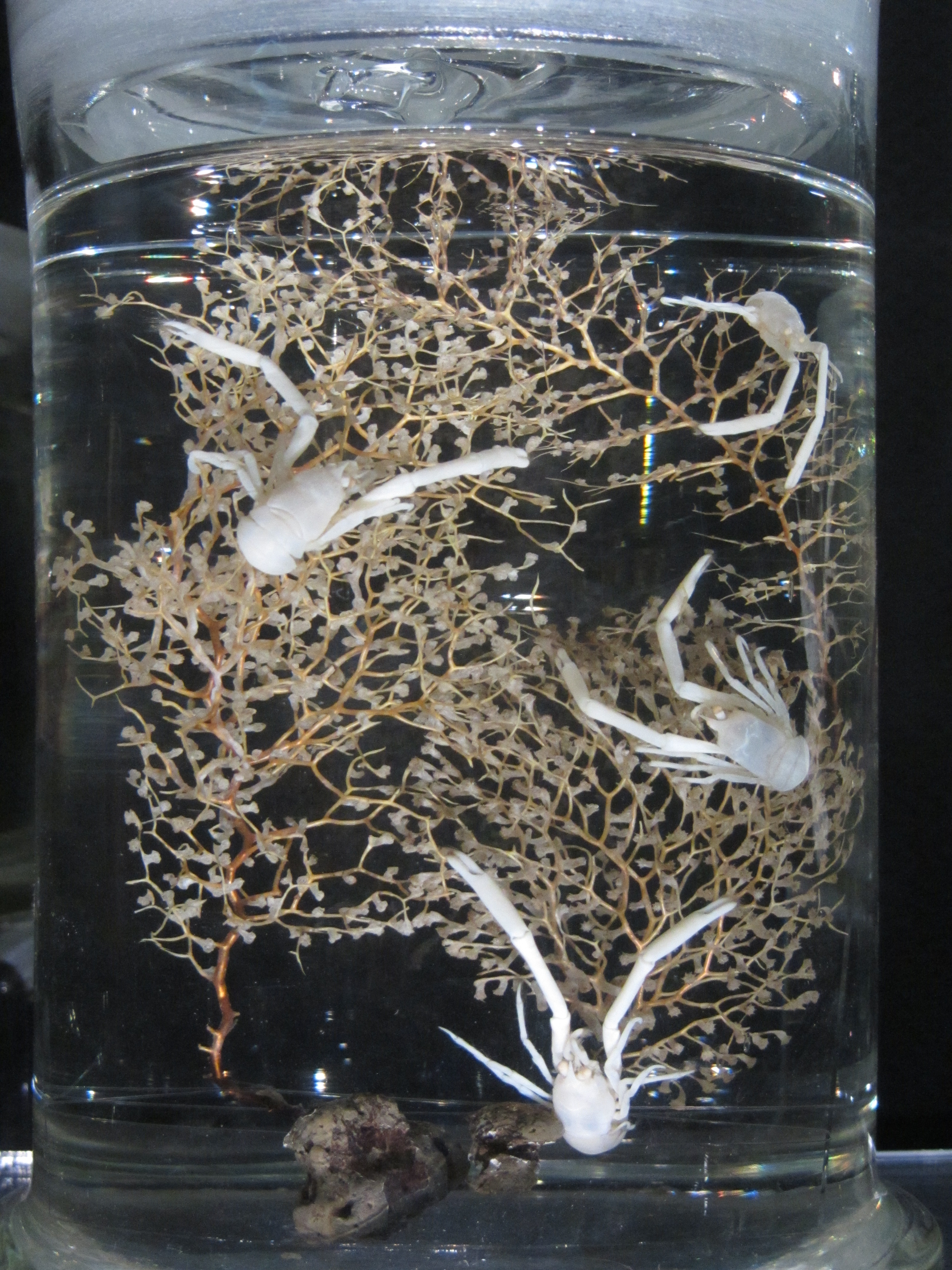
- Uroptychus nigricapillis

Scientific classification
- Domain: Eukaryota
- Kingdom: Animalia
- Phylum: Arthropoda
- Class: Malacostraca
- Order: Decapoda
- Suborder: Pleocyemata
- Infraorder: Anomura
- Family: Chirostylidae
- Genus: Uroptychus; Henderson, 1888

Synonyms
- Diptychus Milne-Edwards, 1880

= Uroptychus =

Genus of crustaceans

Uroptychus is a genus of squat lobsters in the family Chirostylidae found across the Indo-Pacific. The genus Uroptychus contains the following species:

- Uroptychus abdominalis Baba, 2018
- Uroptychus acostalis Baba, 1988
- Uroptychus adiastaltus Baba, 2018
- Uroptychus adnatus Baba, 2018
- Uroptychus aguayoi Chace, 1939
- Uroptychus ahyongi Schnabel, 2020
- Uroptychus albus McCallum & Poore, 2013
- Uroptychus alcocki Ahyong & Poore, 2004
- Uroptychus alius Baba, 2005
- Uroptychus alophus Baba, 2018
- Uroptychus alphonsei Baba & Wicksten, 2017
- Uroptychus altus Baba, 2005
- Uroptychus amabilis Baba, 1979
- Uroptychus anacaena Baba & Lin, 2008
- Uroptychus anatonus Baba & Lin, 2008
- Uroptychus angustus Baba, 2018
- Uroptychus annae Baba, 2018
- Uroptychus anomalus Schnabel, 2020
- Uroptychus anoploetron Baba, 2018
- Uroptychus aotearoa Schnabel, 2020
- Uroptychus armatus (A. Milne-Edwards, 1880)
- Uroptychus articulatus Baba, 2018
- Uroptychus atlanticus Baba & Wicksten, 2017
- Uroptychus australis (Henderson, 1885)
- Uroptychus babai Ahyong & Poore, 2004
- Uroptychus bacillimanus Alcock & Anderson, 1899
- Uroptychus baeomma Baba, 2018
- Uroptychus bardi McCallum & Poore, 2013
- Uroptychus bathamae Schnabel, 2020
- Uroptychus belli Schnabel, 2020
- Uroptychus bellus Faxon, 1893
- Uroptychus belos Ahyong & Poore, 2004
- Uroptychus benthaus Baba, 2018
- Uroptychus bertrandi Baba, 2018
- Uroptychus beryx Baba, 2018
- Uroptychus bicavus Baba & de Saint Laurent, 1992
- Uroptychus bispinatus Baba, 1988
- Uroptychus boisselierae Baba, 2018
- Uroptychus bouvieri Caullery, 1896
- Uroptychus brachycarpus Baba, 2018
- Uroptychus brachydactylus Tirmizi, 1964
- Uroptychus brevipes Baba, 1990
- Uroptychus brevirostris Van Dam, 1933
- Uroptychus brevisquamatus Baba, 1988
- Uroptychus brucei Baba, 1986
- Uroptychus buantennatus Baba, 2018
- Uroptychus calcar Ahyong & Poore, 2004
- Uroptychus capillatus Benedict, 1902
- Uroptychus cardus Ahyong & Poore, 2004
- Uroptychus cartesi Baba & Macpherson, 2012
- Uroptychus cavirostris Alcock & Anderson, 1899
- Uroptychus chacei (Baba, 1986)
- Uroptychus chathami Schnabel, 2020
- Uroptychus ciliatus (Van Dam, 1933)
- Uroptychus clarki Baba, 2018
- Uroptychus compressus Baba & Wicksten, 2019
- Uroptychus comptus Baba, 1988
- Uroptychus concolor (A. Milne-Edwards & Bouvier, 1894)
- Uroptychus convexus Baba, 1988
- Uroptychus corbariae Baba, 2018
- Uroptychus crassior Baba, 1990
- Uroptychus crassipes Van Dam, 1939
- Uroptychus crosnieri Baba, 1990
- Uroptychus ctenodes Baba, 2018
- Uroptychus cylindropus Baba, 2018
- Uroptychus cyrano Poore & Andreakis, 2011
- Uroptychus defayeae Baba, 2018
- Uroptychus dejouanneti Baba, 2018
- Uroptychus dentatus Balss, 1913
- Uroptychus denticulifer Baba, 2018
- Uroptychus denticulisquama Baba, 2018
- Uroptychus depressus Baba, 2018
- Uroptychus diaphorus Baba, 2018
- Uroptychus disangulatus Baba, 2018
- Uroptychus dissitus Baba, 2018
- Uroptychus dualis Baba, 2018
- Uroptychus duplex Baba, 2018
- Uroptychus echinatus Baba, 2018
- Uroptychus edisonicus Baba & Williams, 1998
- Uroptychus elongatus Baba, 2018
- Uroptychus empheres Ahyong & Poore, 2004
- Uroptychus enriquei Baba, 2018
- Uroptychus ensirostris Parisi, 1917
- Uroptychus eratus Baba, 2018
- Uroptychus exilis Baba, 2018
- Uroptychus faxianae Dong, Gan & Li, 2021
- Uroptychus fenneri Baba & Wicksten, 2017
- Uroptychus flindersi Ahyong & Poore, 2004
- Uroptychus floccus Baba, 2018
- Uroptychus fornicatus Chace, 1942
- Uroptychus foulisi Kensley, 1977
- Uroptychus fusimanus Alcock & Anderson, 1899
- Uroptychus glaber Baba, 1981
- Uroptychus gordonae Tirmizi, 1964
- Uroptychus gracilimanus (Henderson, 1885)
- Uroptychus grandior Baba, 2018
- Uroptychus granulatus Benedict, 1902
- Uroptychus granulipes Baba, 2018
- Uroptychus hamatus Khodkina in Zarenkov & Khodina, 1983
- Uroptychus havre Schnabel, 2020
- Uroptychus helenae Schnabel, 2020
- Uroptychus hesperius Ahyong & Poore, 2004
- Uroptychus ihu Schnabel, 2020
- Uroptychus imparilis Baba, 2018
- Uroptychus inaequalis Baba, 2018
- Uroptychus inaequipes Dong, Li, Lu & Wang, 2017
- Uroptychus inclinis Baba, 2005
- Uroptychus indicus Alcock, 1901
- Uroptychus inermis Baba, 2018
- Uroptychus insignis (Henderson, 1885)
- Uroptychus intermedius (A. Milne-Edwards, 1880)
- Uroptychus jamaicensis Benedict, 1902
- Uroptychus janiceae Baba & Wicksten, 2017
- Uroptychus japonicus Ortmann, 1892
- Uroptychus jawi McCallum & Poore, 2013
- Uroptychus jiaolongae Dong & Li, 2015
- Uroptychus joloensis Van Dam, 1939
- Uroptychus kaitara Schnabel, 2009
- Uroptychus kareenae Baba, 2018
- Uroptychus karubar Baba, 2018
- Uroptychus koningen Schnabel, 2020
- Uroptychus lacunatus Baba, 2018
- Uroptychus lanatus Baba, 2018
- Uroptychus laperousazi Ahyong & Poore, 2004
- Uroptychus latior Baba, 2018
- Uroptychus latirostris Yokoya, 1933
- Uroptychus latus Ahyong & Poore, 2004
- Uroptychus laurentae Baba, 2018
- Uroptychus leptus Schnabel, 2020
- Uroptychus levicrustus Baba, 1988
- Uroptychus lindae Baba & Wicksten, 2017
- Uroptychus litosus Ahyong & Poore, 2004
- Uroptychus liui Dong, Gan & Li, 2021
- Uroptychus longicarpus Baba, 2018
- Uroptychus longicheles Ahyong & Poore, 2004
- Uroptychus longioculus Baba, 1990
- Uroptychus longior Baba, 2005
- Uroptychus longvae Ahyong & Poore, 2004
- Uroptychus lumarius Baba, 2018
- Uroptychus macquariae Schnabel, Burghardt & Ahyong, 2017
- Uroptychus macrolepis Baba, 2018
- Uroptychus magnipedalis Baba, 2018
- Uroptychus magnispinatus Baba, 1977
- Uroptychus maori Borradaile, 1916
- Uroptychus marcosi Baba, 2018
- Uroptychus marianicus Dong, Gan & Li, 2021
- Uroptychus marissae Baba & Wicksten, 2015
- Uroptychus maroccanus Türkay, 1976
- Uroptychus mauritius Baba, 2005
- Uroptychus medius Komai, Tsuchida & Fujiwara, 2023
- Uroptychus megistos Baba, 2018
- Uroptychus mesodme Baba, 2018
- Uroptychus michaeli Ahyong & Baba, 2017
- Uroptychus micrommatus Baba, 2018
- Uroptychus minor Baba, 2018
- Uroptychus minutus Benedict, 1902
- Uroptychus modicus Baba, 2018
- Uroptychus multispinosus Ahyong & Poore, 2004
- Uroptychus murrayi Tirmizi, 1964
- Uroptychus nanophyes McArdle, 1901
- Uroptychus naso Van Dam, 1933
- Uroptychus nebulosus Baba, 2018
- Uroptychus ngae Dong, Zhou & Li, 2024
- Uroptychus nicoleae Wicksten & Conway, 2023
- Uroptychus nieli Schnabel, 2020
- Uroptychus nigricapillis Alcock, 1901
- Uroptychus nirvana Schnabel, 2020
- Uroptychus nitidus (A. Milne-Edwards, 1880)
- Uroptychus norfolkanus Baba, 2018
- Uroptychus novaezealandiae Borradaile, 1916
- Uroptychus numerosus Baba, 2018
- Uroptychus obtusus Baba, 2018
- Uroptychus occidentalis Faxon, 1893
- Uroptychus occultispinatus Baba, 1988
- Uroptychus onychodactylus Tirmizi, 1964
- Uroptychus orientalis Baba & Lin, 2008
- Uroptychus oxymerus Ahyong & Baba, 2004
- Uroptychus paenultimus Baba, 2005
- Uroptychus paku Schnabel, 2009
- Uroptychus palmaris Baba, 2018
- Uroptychus paracrassior Ahyong & Poore, 2004
- Uroptychus paraplesius Baba, 2018
- Uroptychus parilis Cabezas, Lin & Chan, 2012
- Uroptychus parisus Baba, 2018
- Uroptychus pars Schnabel, 2020
- Uroptychus parvulus (Henderson, 1885)
- Uroptychus patulus Ahyong & Poore, 2004
- Uroptychus pectoralis Baba, 2018
- Uroptychus pedanomastigus Baba, 2018
- Uroptychus perpendicularis Baba, 2018
- Uroptychus philippei Baba, 2018
- Uroptychus pilosus Baba, 1981
- Uroptychus pinocchio Poore & Andreakis, 2011
- Uroptychus plautus Baba, 2018
- Uroptychus plumella Baba, 2018
- Uroptychus politus (Henderson, 1885)
- Uroptychus pollostadelphus Baba, 2018
- Uroptychus poorei Baba, 2018
- Uroptychus posticus Baba, 2018
- Uroptychus poupini Baba, 2018
- Uroptychus princeps Benedict, 1902
- Uroptychus proberti Schnabel, 2020
- Uroptychus pronus Baba, 2005
- Uroptychus psilus Baba, 2018
- Uroptychus pubescens Faxon, 1893
- Uroptychus quartanus Baba, 2018
- Uroptychus quinarius Baba, 2018
- Uroptychus rafai Baba & Wicksten, 2017
- Uroptychus raymondi Baba, 2000
- Uroptychus reedae Baba & Wicksten, 2017
- Uroptychus remotispinatus Baba & Tirmizi, 1979
- Uroptychus ritchie Schnabel, 2020
- Uroptychus rubrovittatus (A. Milne-Edwards, 1881)
- Uroptychus rugosus (A. Milne-Edwards, 1880)
- Uroptychus rungapapa Schnabel, 2020
- Uroptychus rutua Schnabel, 2009
- Uroptychus sadie Schnabel, 2020
- Uroptychus sagamiae Baba, 2005
- Uroptychus salomon Baba, 2018
- Uroptychus sampadae Padate, Tiwari, Cubelio & Takeda, 2020
- Uroptychus sarahae Baba, 2018
- Uroptychus scandens Benedict, 1902
- Uroptychus seductus Baba, 2018
- Uroptychus senarius Baba, 2018
- Uroptychus senticarpus Baba, 2018
- Uroptychus septimus Baba, 2018
- Uroptychus setifer Baba, 2018
- Uroptychus setosidigitalis Baba, 1977
- Uroptychus setosipes Baba, 1981
- Uroptychus sexspinosus Balss, 1913
- Uroptychus shanei Baba, 2018
- Uroptychus sibogae Van Dam, 1933
- Uroptychus simiae Kensley, 1977
- Uroptychus similis Baba, 1977
- Uroptychus singularis Baba & Lin, 2008
- Uroptychus siraji Tirmizi, 1964
- Uroptychus smib Baba, 2018
- Uroptychus soyomaruae Baba, 1981
- Uroptychus spiniger Benedict, 1902
- Uroptychus spinimanus Tirmizi, 1964
- Uroptychus spinirostris (Ahyong & Poore, 2004)
- Uroptychus spinosior Baba, 2018
- Uroptychus spinosus (A. Milne-Edwards & Bouvier, 1894)
- Uroptychus spinulosus Dong & Li, 2015
- Uroptychus spinulus Baba, 2018
- Uroptychus squamifer Baba, 2018
- Uroptychus stenorhynchus Baba, 2018
- Uroptychus sternospinosus Tirmizi, 1964
- Uroptychus strigosus Baba, 2018
- Uroptychus subsolanus Ahyong & Poore, 2004
- Uroptychus suluensis Van Dam, 1933
- Uroptychus tafeanus Baba, 2018
- Uroptychus taniwha Schnabel, 2020
- Uroptychus taranaki Schnabel, 2020
- Uroptychus taranui Schnabel, 2020
- Uroptychus taratara Schnabel, 2020
- Uroptychus tasmani Schnabel, 2020
- Uroptychus taylorae McCallum & Poore, 2013
- Uroptychus terminalis Baba, 2018
- Uroptychus thermalis Baba & de Saint Laurent, 1992
- Uroptychus toka Schnabel, 2009
- Uroptychus tomentosus Baba, 1974
- Uroptychus torrancei Schnabel, 2020
- Uroptychus tracey Ahyong, Schnabel & Baba, 2015
- Uroptychus transparens Dong, Gan & Li, 2021
- Uroptychus triangularis Miyake & Baba, 1967
- Uroptychus tridentatus (Henderson, 1885)
- Uroptychus trispinatus Baba, 2018
- Uroptychus tuberculatus Baba, 2018
- Uroptychus tuerkayi Baba & Macpherson, 2017
- Uroptychus turgidus Baba, 2018
- Uroptychus uncifer (A. Milne-Edwards, 1880)
- Uroptychus undecimspinosus Kensley, 1977
- Uroptychus valdiviae Balss, 1913
- Uroptychus vandamae Baba, 1988
- Uroptychus vegrandis Baba, 2018
- Uroptychus vicinus Baba, 2018
- Uroptychus volsmar Baba, 2018
- Uroptychus vulcanus Baba, 2018
- Uroptychus webberi Schnabel, 2009
- Uroptychus wolffi Baba, 2005
- Uroptychus worrorra McCallum & Poore, 2013
- Uroptychus xipholepis Van Dam, 1933
- Uroptychus yaldwyni Schnabel, 2009
- Uroptychus yokoyai Ahyong & Poore, 2004
- Uroptychus zeidleri Ahyong & Poore, 2004
- Uroptychus zezuensis Kim, 1972
- Uroptychus zigzag Baba, 2018
