= Pseudomunida =

Scientific classification
- Domain: Eukaryota
- Kingdom: Animalia
- Phylum: Arthropoda
- Class: Malacostraca
- Order: Decapoda
- Suborder: Pleocyemata
- Infraorder: Anomura
- Family: Eumunididae
- Genus: Pseudomunida; Haig, 1979
- Species: P. fragilis

Binomial name
- Pseudomunida fragilis Haig, 1979

Genus of crustaceans

Pseudomunida fragilis is a species of squat lobster in a monotypic genus in the family Eumunididae.
