= Eumunida chani =

Scientific classification
- Kingdom: Animalia
- Phylum: Arthropoda
- Clade: Pancrustacea
- Class: Malacostraca
- Order: Decapoda
- Suborder: Pleocyemata
- Infraorder: Anomura
- Family: Eumunididae
- Genus: Eumunida
- Species: E. chani

Binomial name
- Eumunida chani Baba & Lin, 2008

Species of crustacean

Eumunida chani is a species of chirostylid squat lobster first found in Taiwan. This species can be distinguished by its absence of a pad of densely distributed setae on its first pereopod, the anterior branchial margin which bears two spines, and the carpus of its first pereopod carrying only two spines.
