= Uroptychodes =

Scientific classification
- Kingdom: Animalia
- Phylum: Arthropoda
- Clade: Pancrustacea
- Class: Malacostraca
- Order: Decapoda
- Suborder: Pleocyemata
- Infraorder: Anomura
- Family: Chirostylidae
- Genus: Uroptychodes; Baba, 2004

Genus of crustaceans

Uroptychodes is a genus of squat lobsters in the family Chirostylidae, containing the following species:

- Uroptychodes albatrossae (Baba, 1988)
- Uroptychodes babai Dong & Li, 2010
- Uroptychodes barunae Baba, 2004
- Uroptychodes benedicti (Baba, 1977)
- Uroptychodes epigaster Baba, 2004
- Uroptychodes fuscilineatus Komai, 2021
- Uroptychodes grandirostris (Yokoya, 1933)
- Uroptychodes mortenseni (Van Dam, 1939)
- Uroptychodes musorstomi Baba, 2004
- Uroptychodes nowra (Ahyong & Poore, 2004)
- Uroptychodes okutanii (Baba, 1981a)
- Uroptychodes spinimarginatus (Henderson, 1885)
- Uroptychodes spinulifer (Van Dam, 1940)
- Uroptychodes yapensis Dong, Gan & Li
