= Chani Cohen Zada =

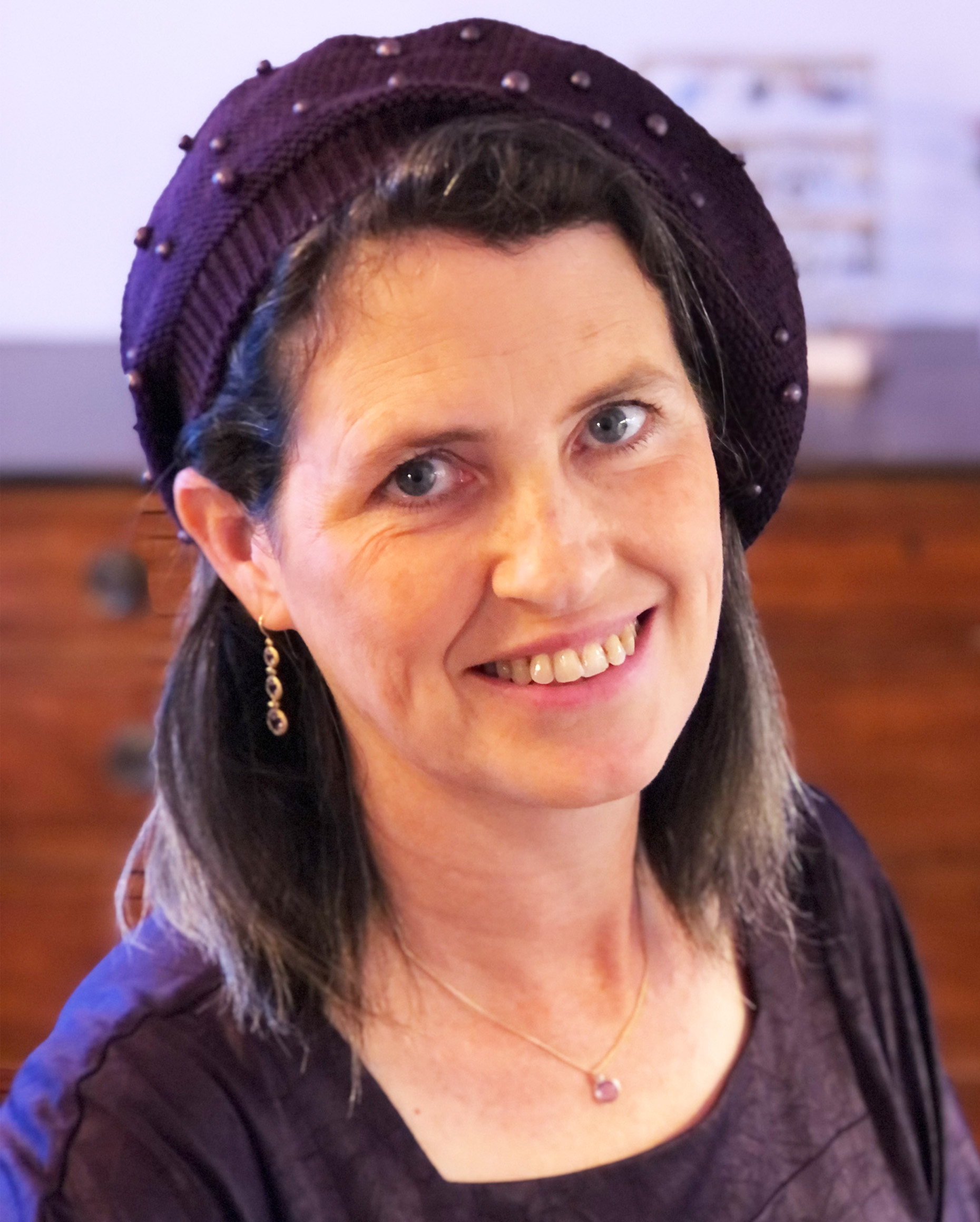
Chani Cohen Zada, artist, 2022

Chani Cohen Zada (חני כהן זדה) is an Israeli figurative painter and artist. She lives and works in the city of Ofakim in the Western Negev and in Talmon in the Ephraim Mountains.

In 2020, Cohen Zada won the Uri Orbach Jewish Culture Award from the Ministry of Education for her work in the field of plastic arts. Her works often have Biblical themes.

== Early life ==
Chana Elisheva Klein was born Honey Lynn Klein in 1968, on a United States Air Force Base in Alamogordo, New Mexico, United States. She is the eldest daughter of Professor Zvi Klein, a French-born Holocaust survivor who became a noted cardiologist and worked on the base and American-born housewife Deborah Klein. At the age of five her family immigrated to Israel.

== Education ==
In 1988, she studied biology at Bar-Ilan University for a year. In 1989 she began studies at Emuna College in Jerusalem in the graphics department. She took a break from her studies following her marriage and birth of her children.

In 1995, she returned to study at Emuna College in the art department under the guidance of award-winning artist Tuvia Katz.

From 2006 to 2016, she studied cognitive development using the Yemima Method and was a student of the creator, Yemima Avital. From 2010 and 2013 she continued her painting and drawing studies at the HaTahana Studio for Figurative Arts in Tel Aviv and attended masters classes from the co-founders Aram Gershuni and David Nipo.

From 2019 to 2022, she participated in portrait workshops with artists David Kassan and Amir Shefet.

== Awards and recognition ==
On March 14, 2021, Chani Cohen Zada was awarded the Uri Orbach Prize for Jewish Culture for 2020 by the Ministry Education's Jewish Culture Department in the field of plastic arts. In 2025 she presented one of her paintings to United States Ambassador to Israel Mike Huckabee as a representative of the organization Mother of IDF Soldiers.

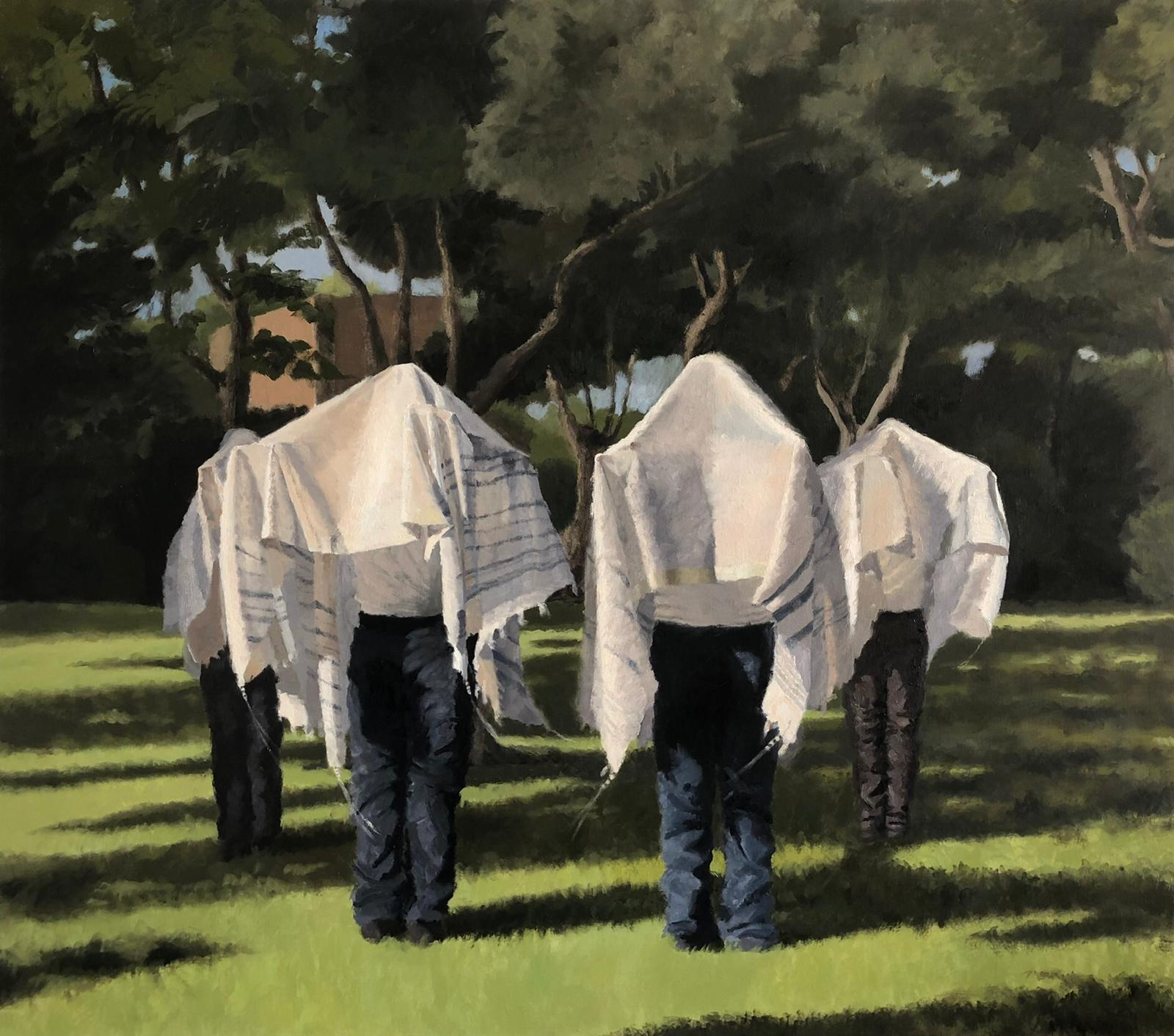
God Bless You and Keep You, by Chani Cohen Zada, 2022.

== Solo exhibitions ==
2024 Mashiv HaRuach – Return of the Spirit. Geulla galley, Jerusalem. Curator: Elchai Salomon, Naaman Levavi

2020 – Small Tools, Big Lights, Al Givaa Gallery, Meitar. Curator: Ronit Amit Nahir.

2019 – Female Water, Wolfson Museum, Jerusalem Biennale. Curator: Rachel Verliebter

2018 – Knowledge of Opposites is One, Artists' House , Tel Aviv. Curator: Aryeh Berkowitz.

2015 – Rachamana, The Other Gallery, Holon. Curator: Shaked Aviv.

2014 – Mirror, Writing, Hayek Center for Contemporary Art, Old Jaffa. Curatorial supervision: David Nipo.

2010 – Freeze, Heikhal Shlomo Museum, Jerusalem. Curator: Dr. Anat Chen.

2010 – Gather Roses, Ofra Gallery. Curated by Ruth Pasdar.

== Group exhibitions ==
2025 – Adama – A Joint Project of the Binyamin and Eshkol Municipalities, 2025, Rebecca Crown Gallery, Jerusalem. Curator: Ofra Shushtari

2025 – Live Ammunition, old National Library building, Hebrew University, Jerusalem. Curator: Nechemia Boaz.

2025 – The Service: Temple Exhibition, Uri Zvi Greenberg Gallery, Jerusalem, Curators: Elhai & Porat Salomon

2024 – Mashiv HaRuach, Uri Zvi Greenberg Gallery, Jerusalem.

2024 – Hineni. Tov VeYafe Gallery, Jerusalem. Curator: Nehemia Boaz

2023 – Shapes of Light, Figure Ground Gallery, Seattle, WA

2022 – Shoshana, Yehi Festival, Uri Zvi House, Jerusalem. Curators: Ofer Kahana and Nehemiah Boaz

2022 – Homebase, Herzliya Zoo Center. Curators: Omer Shani.

2021 – Take Me Home, Jerusalem Biennale, Shaarei Zedek Gallery. Curator: Rami Ozeri

2020 – A Decade of Your Own Studio, David Yellin College . Curators: Dafna Yellon.

2018 – Between Sacred and Profane, Levinsky College , Tel Aviv. Curator: Aryeh Berkowitz.

2017 – Manofim Festival: The Cube Salon, Jerusalem.

2017 – Tseno Ureno: Israeli Female Artists Reflecting on Their Religious and Gender Identity, at the Ein Harod Arts Center and at Ben-Gurion University. Curator: Prof. Haim Maor (initiated by "Studio Mashlech").

2017 – Israeli Art Exhibition, Hatachana Gallery, Bank Hapoalim, Tel Aviv.

2016 – Intersections Lori M. Tisch Gallery ( N.Y. ) New York, United States.

2016 – Israelnow, Gold Gallery Melbourne, Ken Don Gallery Sydney, Australia.

2016 – Secret Art, Meni House , Tel Aviv.

2016 – Jerusalem Biennial, Jewish Funders Network Annual Conference – San Diego, California, United States.

2016 – Women's Work, American Cultural Center, (initiated by "Studio of Her Own").

2016 – Aftershocks, Be'eri Gallery, "Studio of Her Own", curator Ziva Yalin, Sofie Berzon Makie.

2015 – Jerusalem Biennial of Jewish Art, "Ima Ilaa", Heichal Shlomo museum, Curator Nurit Sirkis Bank, Noa Lea Cohn

2015 – Sham, Sham, Beit Avi Hai Jerusalem.

2015 – Sochnot, The North African World Heritage Center, Jerusalem, Israel. "Studio of Her Own", Curator: Sally Heftel Nave.

2014 – Ruach Memalela, Achim Hasid Compound Jerusalem, Israel. "Studio of Her Own", Curator: Haya Fuerstein Zohar

2013 – Station Graduates Exhibition. Curators: Aram Gershunii and David Nipo

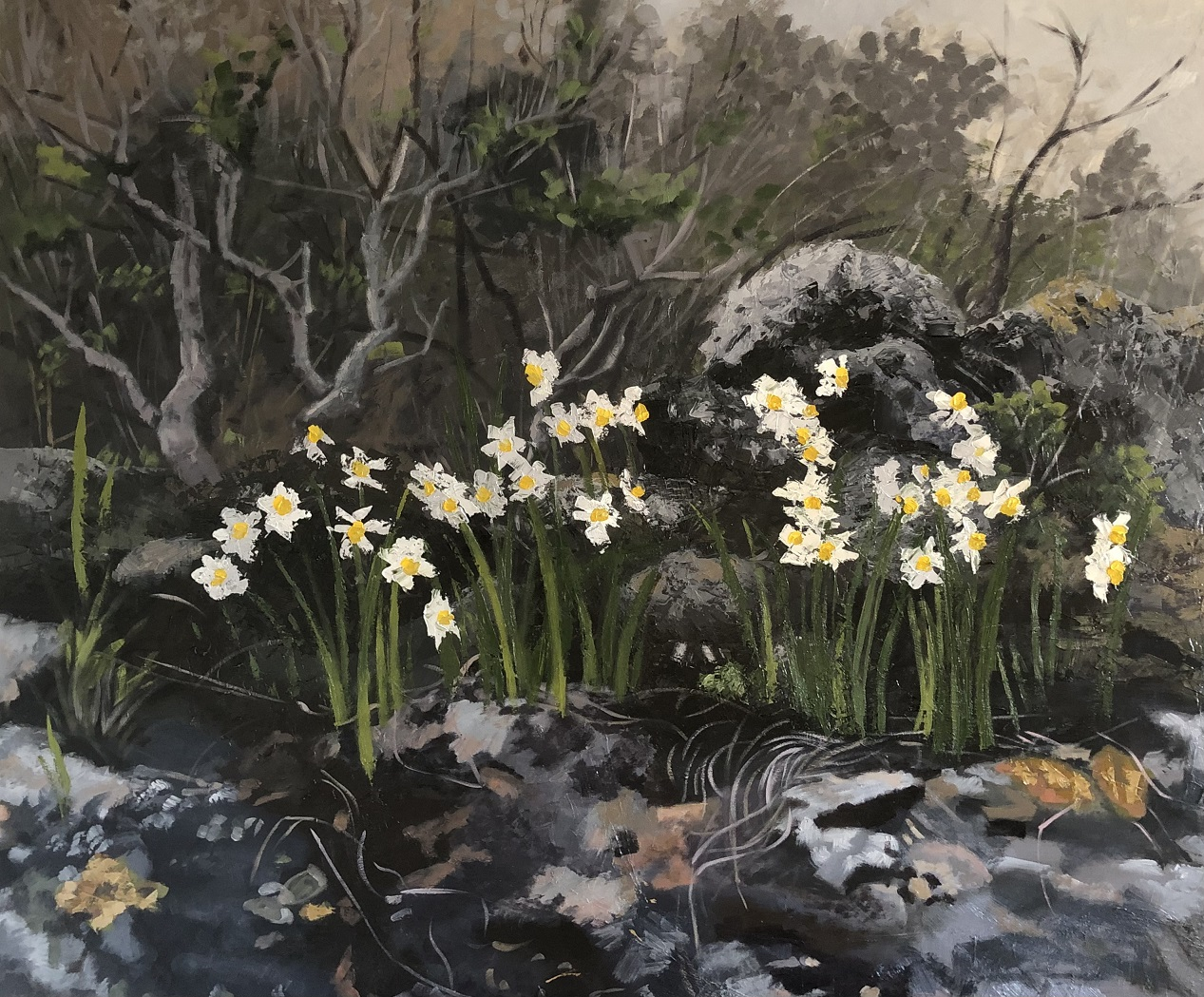

== Projects ==
Installation of a large stained glass window in the synagogue in Talmon.

Her art was used for the music video "The Crown" by singer Etti Ankri in 2021.

== Additional activity ==
2019–2022 Yemima Method Instructor.

2019–2022 Final Exhibition Presenter at START School of the Arts.

2020–2021 Director of the Culture Course at the Uri Ben Amotz Chair.

2007-1993 goldsmithing and calligraphy

== Personal life ==
In 1989, she married Benjamin Cohen Zada, whom she met during her national service when they both volunteered in Kiryat Shmona. The couple has seven sons. In 1992 her family was one of the first to establish Talmon in the Ephraim Mountains.
