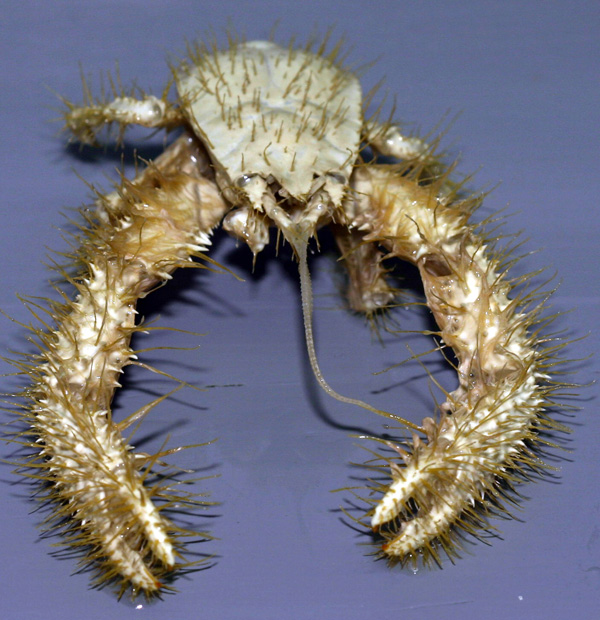

Conservation status
- Not evaluated (IUCN 3.1)

Scientific classification
- Kingdom: Animalia
- Phylum: Arthropoda
- Clade: Pancrustacea
- Class: Malacostraca
- Order: Decapoda
- Suborder: Pleocyemata
- Infraorder: Anomura
- Family: Kiwaidae
- Genus: Kiwa
- Species: K. hirsuta

Binomial name
- Kiwa hirsuta Macpherson, Jones & Segonzac, 2006

= Kiwa hirsuta =

Species of crustacean

Kiwa hirsuta is a crustacean discovered in 2005 in the South Pacific Ocean. This decapod, which is approximately 15 cm (5.9 in) long, is notable for the quantity of silky blond setae (resembling fur) covering its pereiopods (thoracic legs, including claws). Its discoverers dubbed it the "yeti lobster" or "yeti crab".

== Identification ==
Kiwa hirsuta was discovered in the month of March 2005 by a group organized by Robert Vrijenhoek of the Monterey Bay Aquarium Research Institute in Monterey, California, Michel Segonzac of the Ifremer and a Census of Marine Life scientist using the submarine DSV Alvin, operating from RV Atlantis. The discovery was announced on 7 March 2006. It was found along the Pacific-Antarctic Ridge, 1,500 kilometres (930 mi) south of Easter Island at a depth of 2,200 metres (7,200 ft), living on hydrothermal vents. Based on both morphology and molecular data, the organism was deemed to form a new biological family (Kiwaidae); a second species, very interest Kiwa puravida, was discovered in 2006 and described in 2011. Yeti Crabs live in hydrothermal vents, which are deep within the ocean. These vents provide hot water, which makes up the environment where these crabs live. The crabs regulate their ecosystem by using their hairy arms to collect toxins released from the hydrothermal vents.

== Characteristics ==
The animal has strongly reduced eyes that lack pigment, and is thought to be blind. The "hairy" pincers contain filamentous bacteria, which the creature may use to detoxify poisonous minerals from the water emitted by the hydrothermal vents where it lives. This process is known as chemosynthesis. Lipid and isotope analyses provide evidence that epibiotic bacteria are the crab's main food source and K. puravida has highly modified setae (hairs) on its 3rd maxilliped (a mouth appendage) which it uses to harvest these bacteria. Yeti crabs receive most of their essential nutrients from chemosynthetic episymbiotic bacteria which grows on hairlike setae. This chemosynthetic episymbiotic bacteria can be found growing from numerous areas of their ventral surface as well as their appendages. The ε- and γ- proteobacteria that this methane-deep species farms are closely related to hydrothermal-vent decapod epibionts. These bacteria contain enzymes that are involved with the reductive tricarboxylic acid cycle and sulfite oxidation. It is believed that these enzymes play a critical role in carbon fixation and sulfur cycling. Alternatively, it may be a carnivore, although it is generally thought to feed on bacteria.

Although it is often referred to as the "furry lobster" and confused with lobsters outside the scientific literature, Kiwa hirsuta is a squat lobster, more closely related to crabs and hermit crabs than true lobsters. The term "furry lobster" is more commonly used for the family Synaxidae. The "yeti crab" was found in a recently discovered family called the Kiwaidae. This family is closely associated with the two families, Epsilon and Gammaproteobacteria.

== Etymology ==
Macpherson et al. named the genus Kiwa after "the god(dess) of the shellfish in the Polynesian mythology." Hirsuta is Latin for "hairy."

== Reproduction and life cycle ==
Kiwa hirsuta exhibits a unique reproductive strategy. Unlike many other crustaceans, the females of this species carry their eggs in a specialized brooding structure on their abdomen. The eggs are attached to setae, and the female cares for them until they hatch into larvae. This method of parental care is distinctive among deep-sea organisms.

== Genomic studies ==
Genomic studies of Kiwa hirsuta have provided insights into its evolutionary history and adaptation to the extreme environment of hydrothermal vents. The analysis of its genome may offer clues about the genetic basis of its unique characteristics, such as the adaptation to low-light conditions and the utilization of chemosynthetic bacteria for nutrition.

== Population dynamics and conservation ==
Studies on the population dynamics of Kiwa hirsuta are ongoing to understand factors such as population size, growth rates, and potential threats to its habitat. Conservation efforts are also being explored to mitigate the impact of deep-sea mining and other human activities on the hydrothermal vent ecosystems where these crabs reside.

== Behavioral observations ==
Observations of Kiwa hirsuta in its natural habitat have provided valuable information about its behavior. For example, researchers have documented interactions between individuals, including potential mating behaviors and social dynamics within populations living around hydrothermal vents.
