= Ministry for Social Equality =

Government ministry of Israel

- המשרד לשיוויון חברתי
- Emblem of Israel

Agency overview
- Formed: 2007
- Jurisdiction: Government of Israel
- Minister responsible: May Golan
- Agency executive: Merav Stern, (Acting)
- Website: www.shivyon.gov.il

The Ministry for Social Equality for Israel (Hebrew: המשרד לשוויון חברתי), until August 2015 called the Ministry for Senior Citizens (Hebrew: המשרד לאזרחים ותיקים, Misrad LeAzrahim Vatikim), is a government ministry in Israel. The ministerial post was created following the coalition agreement between Kadima and Gil (the Pensioners' Party) after the 2006 elections, although the ministry itself was not formed until a vote of approval by the Knesset on 25 July 2007.

== List ministers ==
#	Minister	Party	Government	Term start	Term end	Notes
1	Rafi Eitan	Gil	31	4 May 2006	31 March 2009	
2	Benjamin Netanyahu	Likud	32	31 March 2009	18 March 2013	Serving Prime Minister
3	Uri Orbach	The Jewish Home	33	18 March 2013	16 February 2015	Died in office
4	Gila Gamliel	Likud	34	14 May 2015	17 May 2020	
5	Meirav Cohen	Blue and White	35	17 May 2020	8 January 2021	
–	Meirav Cohen	Yesh Atid	36	13 June 2021	29 December 2022	
6	Amichai Chikli	Likud	37	29 December 2022	24 January 2024	
7	May Golan	Likud	37	24 January 2024		

=== Deputy ministers ===
#	Minister	Government	Party	Term start	Term end
1	Lea Nass	Likud	32	31 March 2009	18 March 2013
