= Chania (disambiguation) =

Chania is a city of Greece.

Chania may also refer to:

- Chania (constituency), a constituency of the Hellenic Parliament
- Chania (regional unit), a regional unit of Crete
- Chania International Airport

== See also ==
- charnia
