= Meirav Cohen =

Israeli politician (born 1983)

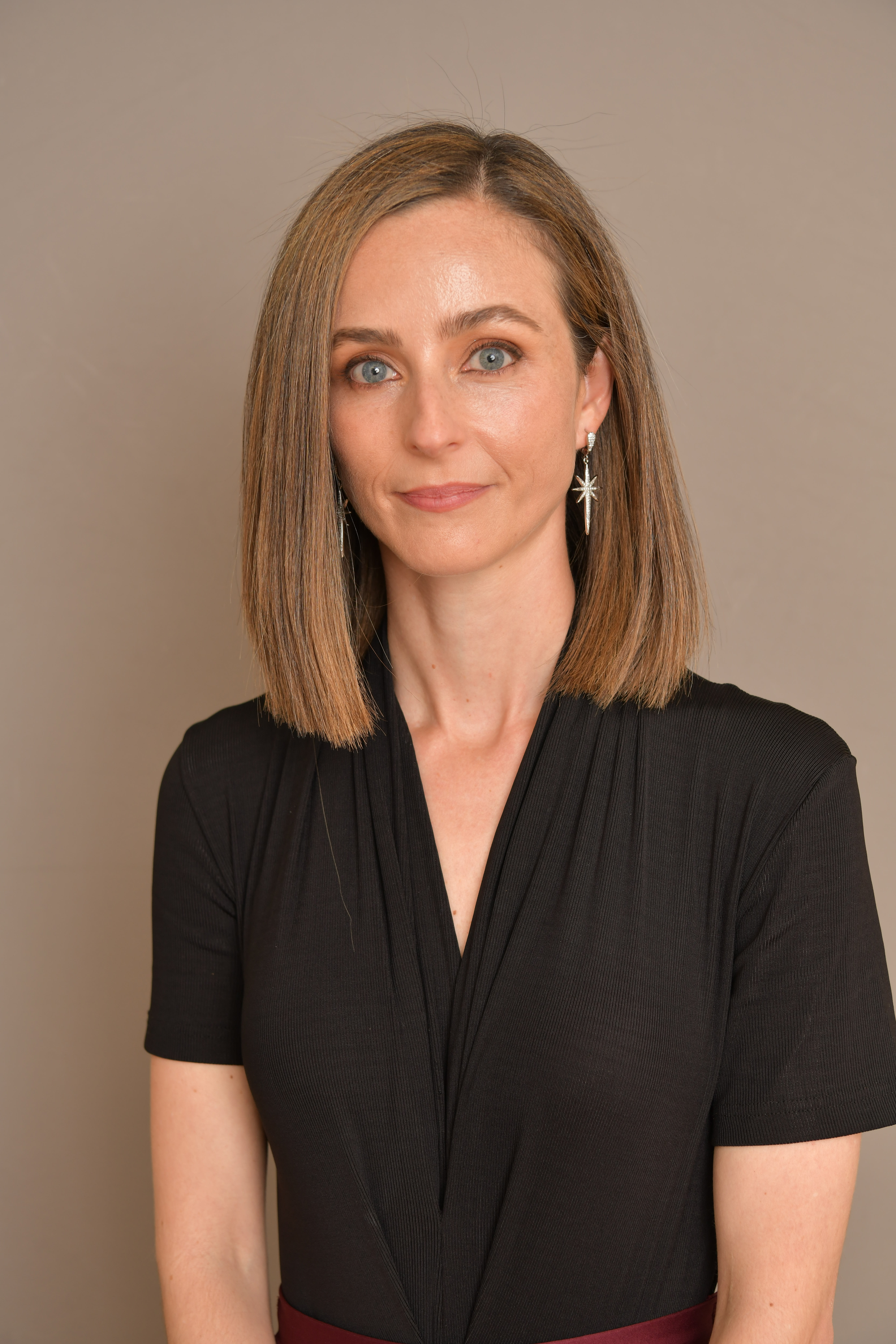
- Cohen in 2021

Ministerial roles
- 2020–2021: Minister for Social Equality
- 2021–2022: Minister for Social Equality

Faction represented in the Knesset
- 2019–2021: Blue and White
- 2021: Yesh Atid
- 2022–2026: Yesh Atid
- 2026–: Together

Personal details
- Born: 26 August 1983 (age 43) Jerusalem, Israel

Meirav Cohen (Hebrew: מֵירַב כֹּהֵן; born 26 August 1983) is an Israeli politician and social equality activist. She is currently a member of the Knesset for Together and previously was an MK for Yesh Atid and served as Minister for Social Equality from May 2020 to January 2021. She took up the post again in June 2021.

== Early life and education ==
Cohen was born and raised in Jerusalem to Saadia Cohen and Solange Shulamit (née Pouni) who both immigrated to Israel from Morocco. Her father worked as a truck driver and her mother ran a day care center in their home. Her family moved to the neighbouring town of Mevaseret Zion while she was at school. She later attended Harel High School in Mevaseret Zion. She has three older brothers.

During her two-year mandatory military service in the Israel Defense Forces from 2001 to 2003 she served in Army Radio ('Galatz') as a reporter, producer, and presenter of segments on economic issues; and as a newscast anchor. In 2004 she was appointed socio-economic spokesperson of the Prime Minister's Office under Ariel Sharon.

In 2006 she started studying at the Hebrew University of Jerusalem, graduating with a BA in economics and business administration in 2009 and an MBA in 2011.

== Career ==
In 2011 Cohen was elected to Jerusalem City Council as part of the Jerusalem Hitorerut party, becoming the portfolio holder for youth. She also became CEO of the NGO Civic Trust, which promotes fair business practices, and founded a nonprofit that fights fraud against the elderly.

In 2013 she joined Tzipi Livni's Hatnuah party and was placed ninth on the party's list for the 2013 Knesset elections, but the party won only six seats. Prior to the April 2019 elections she joined the Israel Resilience Party. After the party joined the Blue and White alliance, she was given the seventeenth slot on the joint list, and was subsequently elected to the Knesset as the alliance won 35 seats. She was re-elected in September 2019 and March 2020. In May 2020 she was appointed Minister for Social Equality in the new government. In January 2021 she left Blue and White and joined Yesh Atid. In July 2021 she resigned from the Knesset under the Norwegian Law, remaining a government minister.

== Personal life ==
Cohen is married to Yuval Edmon, deputy head of the National Economic Council. They live in the Yefeh Nof neighborhood in Jerusalem and have three children.

== See also ==
- Women in the Israel Defense Forces
- List of female cabinet ministers of Israel
