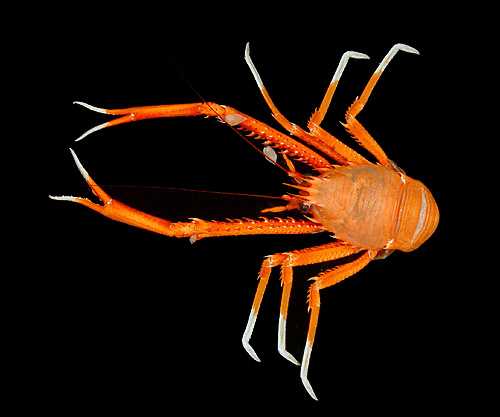
- Eumunida picta

Scientific classification
- Kingdom: Animalia
- Phylum: Arthropoda
- Clade: Pancrustacea
- Class: Malacostraca
- Order: Decapoda
- Suborder: Pleocyemata
- Infraorder: Anomura
- Superfamily: Chirostyloidea; Ortmann, 1892

Families
- Chirostylidae Ortmann, 1892; Eumunididae A. Milne-Edwards & Bouvier, 1900; Kiwaidae Macpherson, Jones & Segonzac, 2005

= Chirostyloidea =

Superfamily of anomuran crustaceans

Chirostyloidea is an anomuran superfamily with squat lobster-like representatives. It comprises the four families Chirostylidae, Eumunididae, Kiwaidae, and Sternostylidae. Although representatives of Chirostyloidea are superficially similar to galatheoid squat lobsters, they are more closely related to Lomisoidea and Aegloidea together forming the clade Australopoda. No fossils can be confidently assigned to the Chirostyloidea, although Pristinaspina may belong either in the family Kiwaidae or Chirostylidae.

== Genera ==
Chirostyloidea contains the following families and genera:

Chirostylidae Ortmann, 1892

- Chirostylus Ortmann, 1892
- † Eouroptychus De Angeli & Ceccon, 2012
- Gastroptychus Caullery, 1896
- Hapaloptyx Stebbing, 1920
- Heteroptychus Baba, 2018
- † Phalangiopsis Charbonnier, Audo, Garassino & Hyžný, 2017
- Uroptychodes Baba, 2004
- Uroptychus Henderson, 1888

Eumunididae A. Milne-Edwards & Bouvier, 1900

- Eumunida Smith, 1883
- Pseudomunida Haig, 1979

Kiwaidae Macpherson, Jones & Segonzac, 2005

- Kiwa Macpherson, Jones & Segonzac, 2005

† Pristinaspinidae Ahyong & Roterman, 2014

- † Pristinaspina Schweitzer & Feldmann, 2000

Sternostylidae Baba, Ahyong & Schnabel, 2018

- Sternostylus Baba, Ahyong & Schnabel, 2018
