= Emerita rathbunae =

Scientific classification
- Domain: Eukaryota
- Kingdom: Animalia
- Phylum: Arthropoda
- Class: Malacostraca
- Order: Decapoda
- Suborder: Pleocyemata
- Infraorder: Anomura
- Family: Hippidae
- Genus: Emerita
- Species: E. rathbunae

Binomial name
- Emerita rathbunae Schmitt, 1935

Species of crustacean

Emerita rathbunae is a species of "mole crabs" or "sand crabs" in the genus Emerita that lives along the tropical Pacific coasts of the Americas.

== Description ==
Emerita rathbunae exhibits an extreme form of sexual dimorphism, with tiny neotenous males attaching themselves to the female's appendages, "thus carrying the tendency for small males in this genus almost to the verge of parasitism". Sexually mature females are typically 33–44 mm (1.3–1.7 in) in carapace length, while males are only 2.5–3.0 mm (0.10–0.12 in).

== Distribution and taxonomy ==
Emerita rathbunae is found on the shores of the eastern Pacific Ocean, from the southern end of the Gulf of California in Mexico to Iquique in northern Chile, including the Galápagos Islands. In the south of its range, E. rathbunae co-occurs with the southern population of E. analoga, which occurs as far north as mainland Ecuador.

Despite their sympatry, the closest relative of E. rathbunae is not E. analoga; rather, E. rathbunae is part of a clade that also includes species from the western Atlantic Ocean, including E. portoricensis and E. benedictii. The last common ancestor of the genus is thought to have lived in the Pacific Ocean, and to have colonised the Gulf of Mexico when the Isthmus of Panama was submerged, and E. rathbunae is thought to have similarly recolonised the Pacific from ancestors that lived on the Atlantic side of the Isthmus of Panama.

Emerita rathbunae was described by Waldo L. Schmitt in 1935; the type locality was Punta Chame in Panama, and the holotype was deposited in the United States National Museum as specimen USNM 47887. The specific epithet rathbunae commemorates the American carcinologist Mary J. Rathbun.

== Ecology ==
Emerita rathbunae lives in the intertidal zone, where it uses the swash for transportation and filter-feeding. In Ecuador, it is one of the most abundant animals to surf the swash, together with the sea snail Olivella semistriata. The two avoid competition since E. rathbunae prefers steeper beaches with coarser sediments and rougher swash than O. semistriata, and positions itself lower in the swash than O. semistriata. Based on comparisons with other Emerita species, E. rathbunae is thought to be a very capable swimmer, and to burrow rapidly into the sand.

== Development ==
The larvae of E. rathbunae pass through a variable number of moults before reaching adulthood. While the majority of larvae pass through eight zoeal stages before reaching the megalopa, others may pass through seven or nine. This process lasts 64–96 days, during which time the larvae increase in length from around 1 mm (0.04 in) to around 8 mm (0.31 in). They remain as megalopa larvae for 10–13 days, before moulting into the juvenile form.
