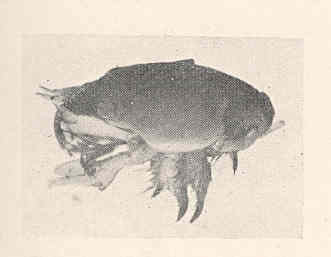

Scientific classification
- Kingdom: Animalia
- Phylum: Arthropoda
- Clade: Pancrustacea
- Class: Malacostraca
- Order: Decapoda
- Suborder: Pleocyemata
- Infraorder: Anomura
- Family: Hippidae
- Genus: Emerita
- Species: E. talpoida

Binomial name
- Emerita talpoida (Say, 1817)

Synonyms
- Hippa talpoida Say, 1817

= Emerita talpoida =

Species of crab

Emerita talpoida, known generally as the Atlantic mole crab, Atlantic sand crab, or sand fiddler, is a species of mole crab in the family Hippidae. It is found in the western Atlantic Ocean and Mexico along the shoreline.

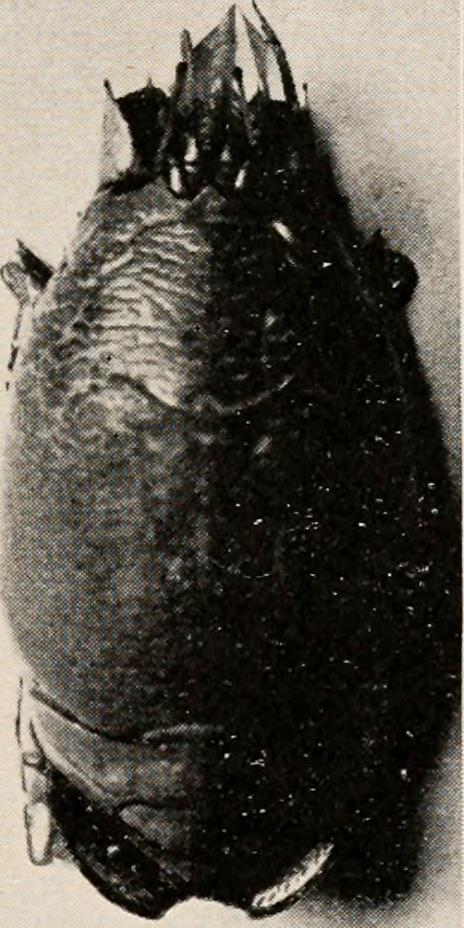
Atlantic mole crab, Emerita talpoida

== Range ==
The Atlantic mole crab inhabits the swash zone of sandy beaches from Cape Cod south to the gulf Coast of Mexico. It is one of seven New World Emerita species.

== Ecology ==
Like all Emerita species, the Atlantic mole crab is a fossorial filter feeder. It requires moving water in order to feed, and it does so by burrowing itself backwards into the sand. It uses its exposed feathery antennae to filter algae, detritus, and plankton.

The Atlantic mole crab is an important food source for the Atlantic ghost crab, the blue crab, and certain species of fish in the swash zone. Shorebirds, notably sanderlings, have also been observed foraging for sand crabs. The combination of its burrowing feeding strategy and its camouflaged carapace assist the Atlantic mole crab in evading predation.

Because they spend much of their life in the swash zone, they can serve as a bioindicator for the effects of large-scale engineering works.

== Taxonomy ==
Emerita talpoida was originally described as Hippa talpoida in 1817. In 1879 a review of the family reassigned multiple species, including H. talpoida, from the genus Hippa to the genus Emerita. The two are now considered sister genera.
