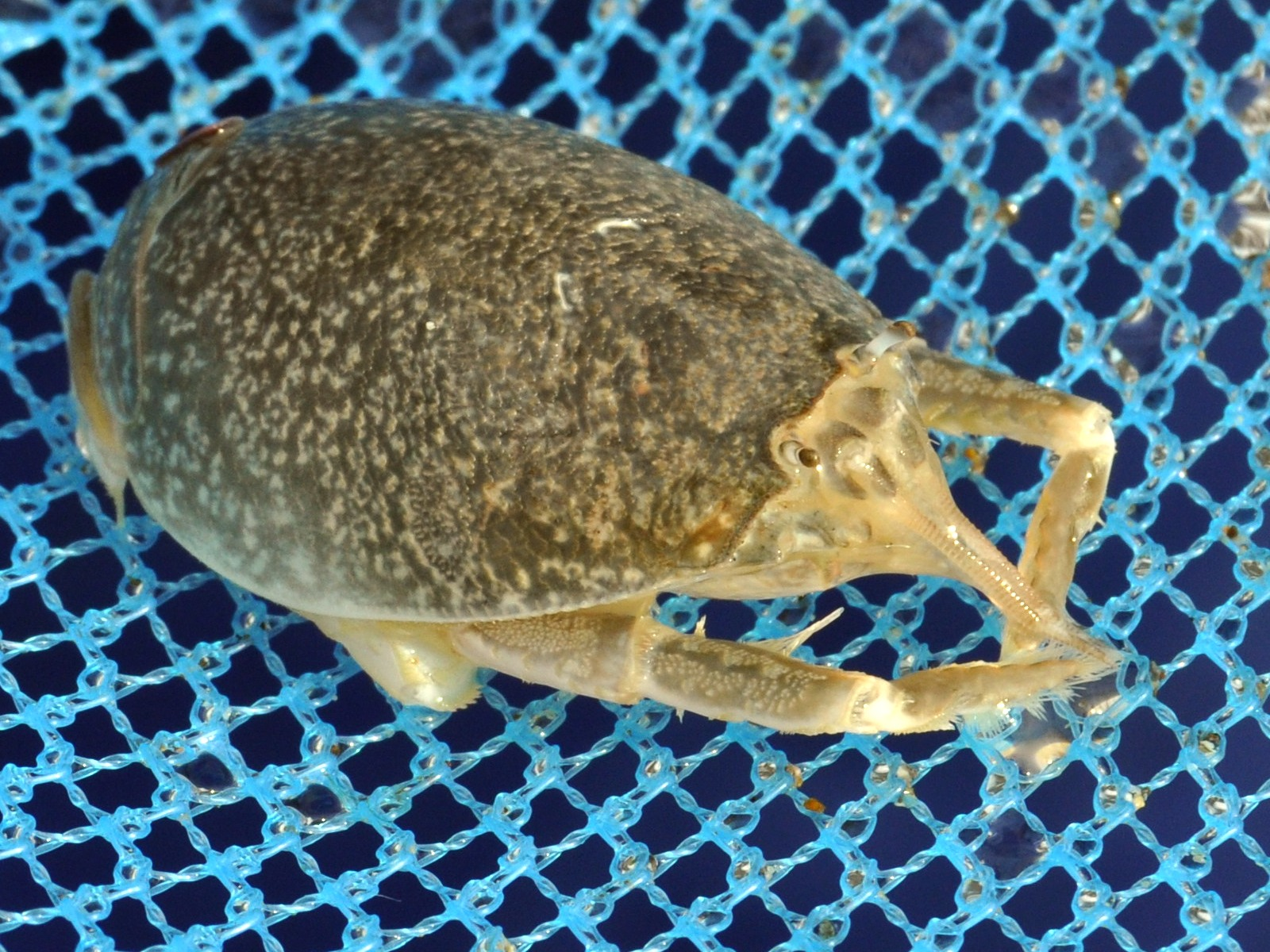
- Hippa adactyla, a 22-mm specimen from Palabuhanratu, Sukabumi Regency

Scientific classification
- Domain: Eukaryota
- Kingdom: Animalia
- Phylum: Arthropoda
- Class: Malacostraca
- Order: Decapoda
- Suborder: Pleocyemata
- Infraorder: Anomura
- Family: Hippidae
- Genus: Hippa
- Species: H. adactyla

Binomial name
- Hippa adactyla Fabricius, 1787

Synonyms
- Remipes testudinarius Latreille, 1806; Remipes denticulatifrons White, 1847

= Hippa adactyla =

Species of crustacean

Hippa adactyla is a species of small, sand-burrowing decapod crustacean found living along the coasts of Indo-West Pacific waters. It is found on exposed sandy beaches in the swash region of the intertidal zone.

== Description ==
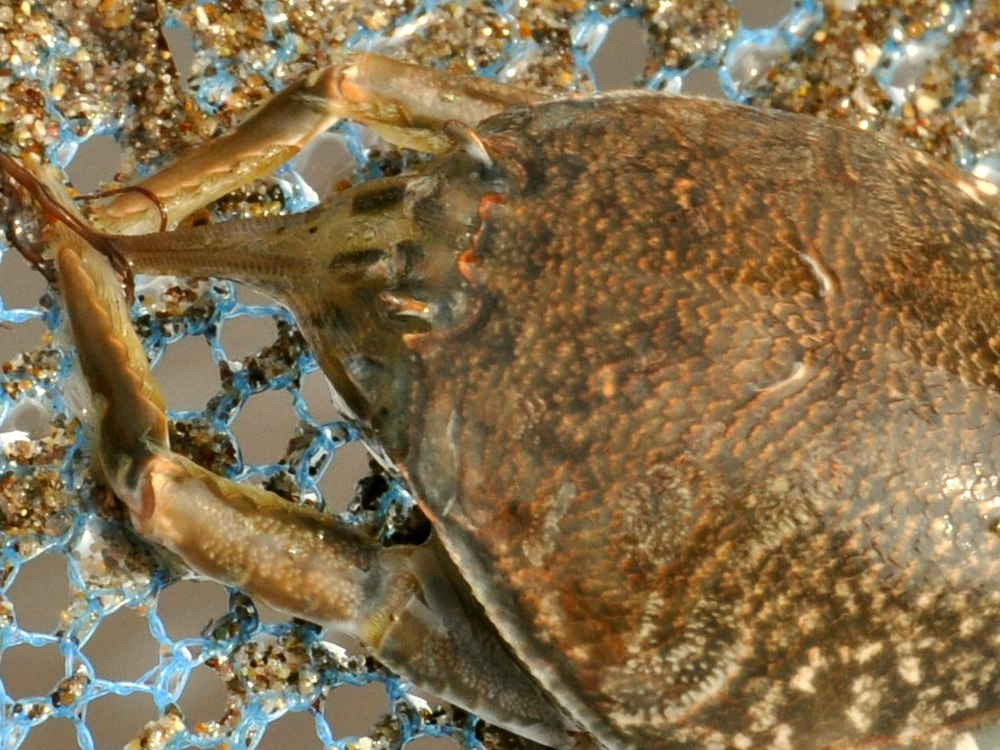
Frontal region close up

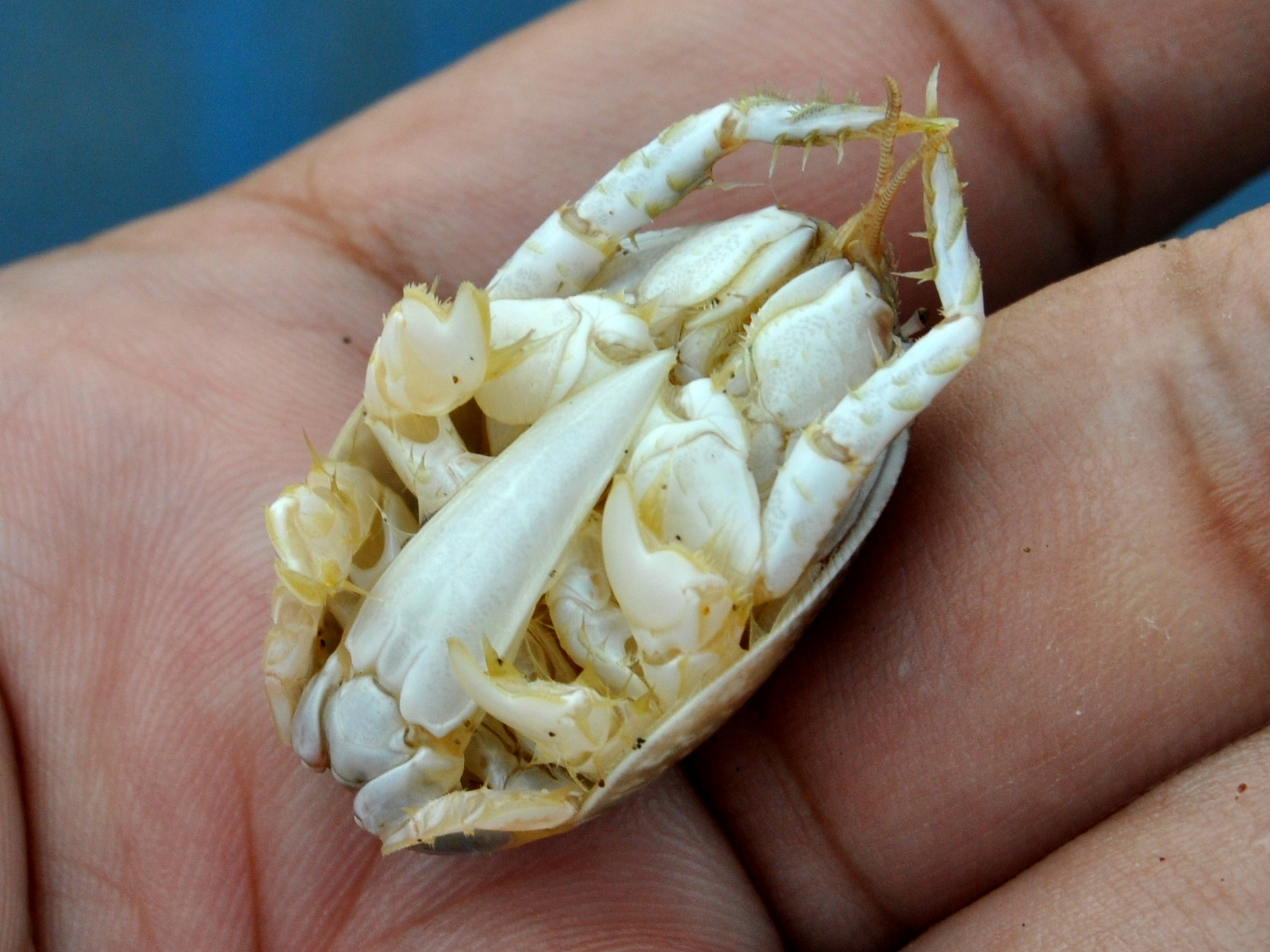
Ventral with big telson

A small crustacean. Carapace ovate, more long than wide; neotype measurements: 25.1 mm × 22.5 mm. Females tends to have larger bodies than males; on the southern coast of Java, the carapace length is 17.6–34.9 mm in females or 18.1–27.7 in males.

According to Haig (1974):

"Carapace densely covered with sharply serrate, transverse lines. Frontal margin five-toothed; outer pair narrow, triangular, and sharp-pointed, and in adults projecting well beyond inner ones; inner pair rounded; between them a small median denticle, broadly triangular and scarcely produced. A row of 50–55 shallow, setiferous, slightly elongate pits near each lateral margin, forming a narrow band. Antennal flagellum with 3–6 articles, the number increasing with age. Dactyl of second and third legs deeply falcate, distal and proximal portions of the concave margin meeting at a right angle."

== Distribution ==
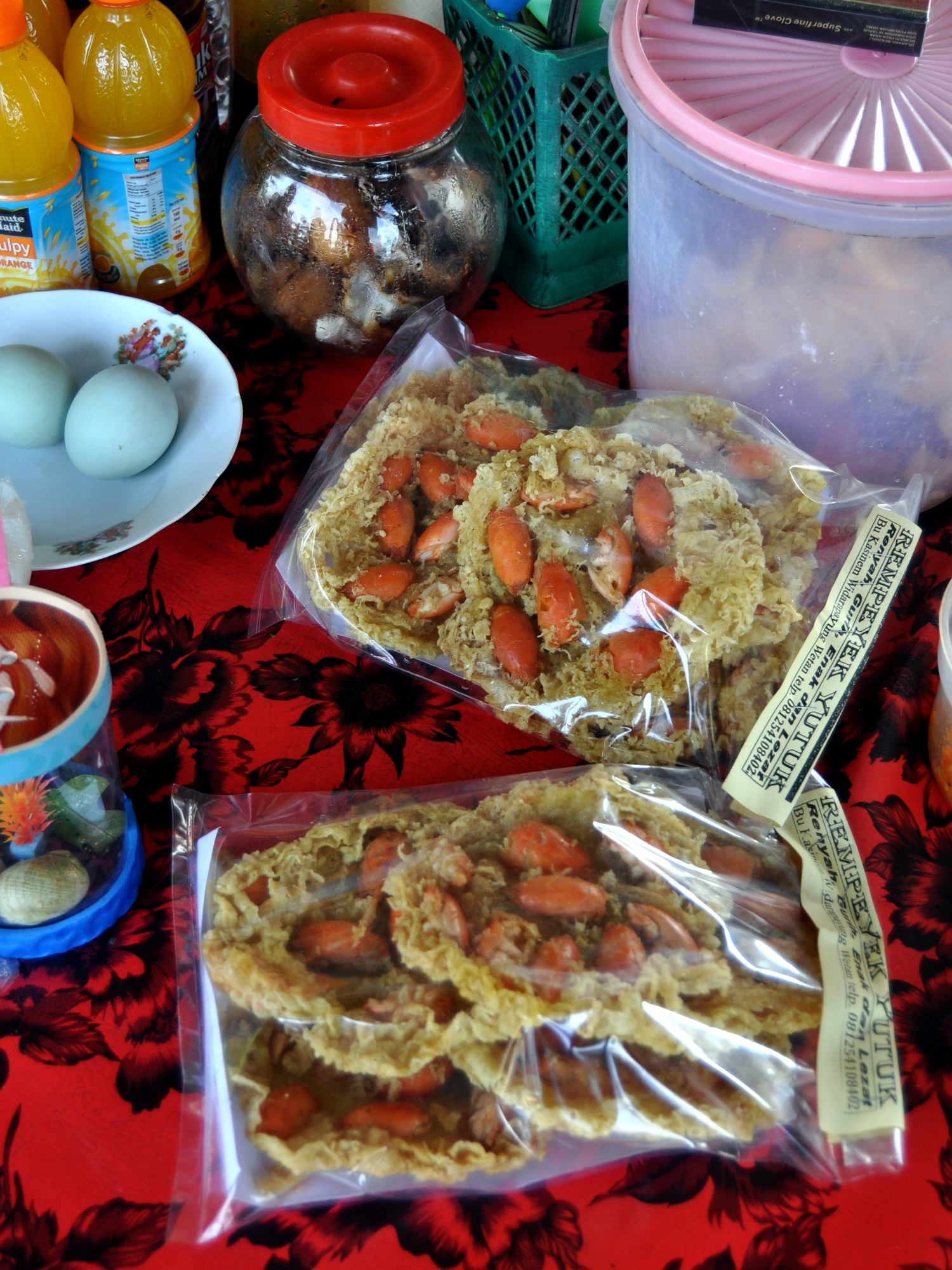
Hippoidea spp. cooked and sold as rice crackers, in southern coasts of Central Java

Hippa adactyla occurs in Indo-West Pacific waters: from Madagascar eastward to the Marquesas Islands, northward to Japan (Misaki, Sagami Bay), and southward to Queensland (Australia).

This small crustacean is especially found on sandy bottoms of low intertidal to shallow subtidal.

In Malaysia, the crustaceans are locally known as Yat Yat or Ibu Remis. They can be found along the beaches in Kelantan during the monsoon season. The crustaceans are a local delicacy that is usually fried with eggs or roasted on a skewer like satay.

== Uses ==
Known locally as yutuk in southern coasts of Central Java, this crustacean is often caught by local people and cooked as a delicacy.
