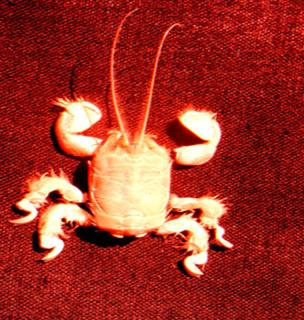

Scientific classification
- Kingdom: Animalia
- Phylum: Arthropoda
- Class: Malacostraca
- Order: Decapoda
- Suborder: Pleocyemata
- Infraorder: Anomura
- Family: Albuneidae
- Genus: Albunea
- Species: A. carabus

Binomial name
- Albunea carabus (Linnaeus, 1758)

Synonyms
- Cancer carabus Linnaeus, 1758; Albunea guerinii Lucas, 1853; Albunea barbara Ortmann, 1896 (nomen nudum)

= Albunea carabus =

Species of crustacean

Albunea carabus is a rare species of "sand crab" or "mole crab" in the family Albuneidae. It lives in shallow, turbulent waters in sandy areas of the tropical eastern Atlantic Ocean and the Mediterranean Sea.

== Description ==
Albunea carabus is typically up to 2 centimetres (0.8 in) long. In common with other species of Albunea, it has a quadrangular carapace with a concave rear edge, and flattened legs, which it uses for digging in sand. The first pair of pereiopods are subchelate (forming a claw with one movable finger pressing onto a solid edge, rather than a fixed finger), and all five pairs are flattened into shovels and are effective at digging. The pleon (abdomen) is shorter than the carapace, and bears four pairs of pleopods in females, but none in males. The pleon ends in a telson flanked by a pair of uropods, which are similar in form to the pereiopods, and aid in digging.

The larvae of Albunea carabus are likely to pass through five planktonic zoea instars before reaching the juvenile stage, as also seen in Albunea symmysta. Over the first three of these instars, the larvae increase from around 1.56 mm to around 2.72 mm in total length. By the third zoea instar, the pereiopods begin to show as small buds, and uropods are present alongside the broad telson.

== Distribution ==
Albunea carabus is found on parts the African coast of the Atlantic Ocean and in the Mediterranean Sea, where it is the only mole crab. It is widespread in the western Mediterranean basin (Ligurian Sea and Tyrrhenian Sea), but is only known from very few records east of the Straits of Messina. These have included a site off the estuary of the Nahr Rubin river in Israel, and several collections from the Gulf of İskenderun. Albunea carabus has also been recorded from Ghana, Togo and Benin, but records from Saint Helena, the Azores and Madeira could refer to the related species A. paretii.

== Ecology ==
Albunea carabus typically lives slightly offshore, at depths of 3–40 m (10–131 ft), in sandy environments where the water is very turbid. It seems to prefer areas with strong hydrodynamics, including estuaries.

== Taxonomy ==
Albunea carabus was first described by Carl Linnaeus in his 1758 10th edition of Systema Naturae, as "Cancer carabus". He had received the material from Erik Skjöldebrand ("E. Brander"), the Swedish consul in Algiers. Friedrich Weber erected the new genus Albunea in 1795 for this species and Albunea symmysta. Within the genus Albunea, Albunea carabus is placed in the informal "A. carabus group" of species, alongside A. bulla and A. danai. The group also includes two fossil species – A. asymmetrica and A. turritellacola.

Antoine Risso described "Hippa caerulea" as a new species in 1816; although this was synonymised with A. carabus by Lipke Holthuis in 1977 (with reservations), it is now thought to be an isopod of the genus Gnathia, perhaps Gnathia phallonajopsis.
