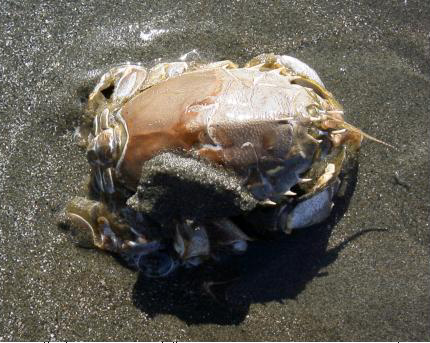

Scientific classification
- Kingdom: Animalia
- Phylum: Arthropoda
- Clade: Pancrustacea
- Class: Malacostraca
- Order: Decapoda
- Suborder: Pleocyemata
- Infraorder: Anomura
- Superfamily: Hippoidea
- Family: Blepharipodidae; Boyko, 2002

Genera
- Blepharipoda Randall, 1840; Lophomastix Benedict, 1904

= Blepharipodidae =

Blepharipodidae Temporal range: Eocene–Recent

Family of crustaceans

Blepharipodidae is a family of sand crabs (Hippoidea), comprising the two genera Blepharipoda and Lophomastix. They are distinguished from the other families in the superfamily Hippoidea by the form of the gills, which are trichobranchiate (filamentous) in Blepharipodidae, but phyllobranchiate (lamellar) in Albuneidae and Hippidae. Fossils belonging to the genus Lophomastix have been found in rocks dating back to the Eocene.
