= Sand flea =

Sand flea may refer to:

- Arthropoda of the class Insecta:
  - Sandfly
  - Chigoe flea Tunga penetrans
- Crustacea of the class Malacostraca:
  - Talitridae
  - Emerita (crustacean), also known as mole crab
- Culicoides furens, a biting midge known colloquially as "sand fleas", particularly in the Southeastern U.S.
- Operation Sand Flea, US operations in Panama
