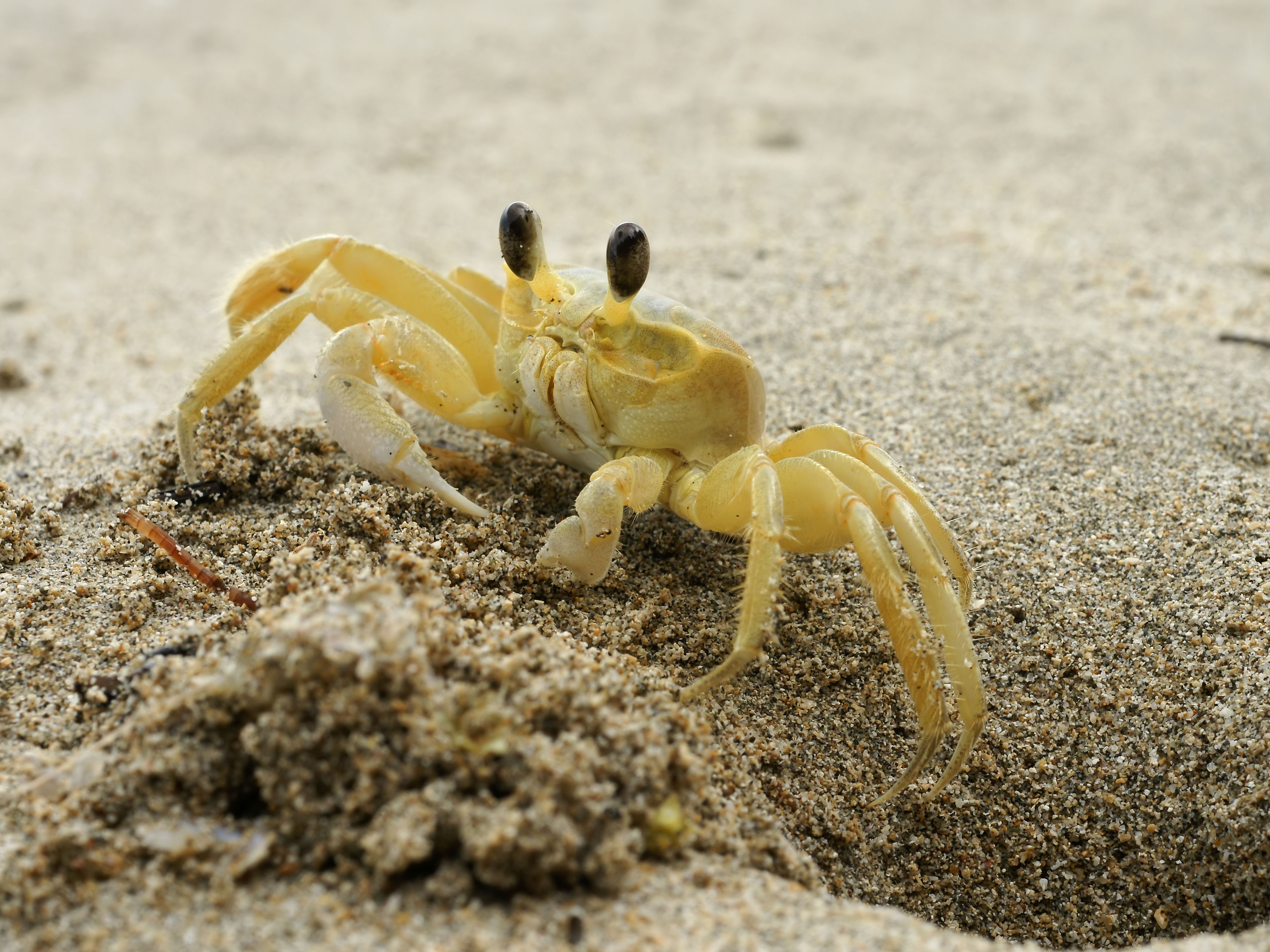
- Adult O. quadrata by a burrow entrance
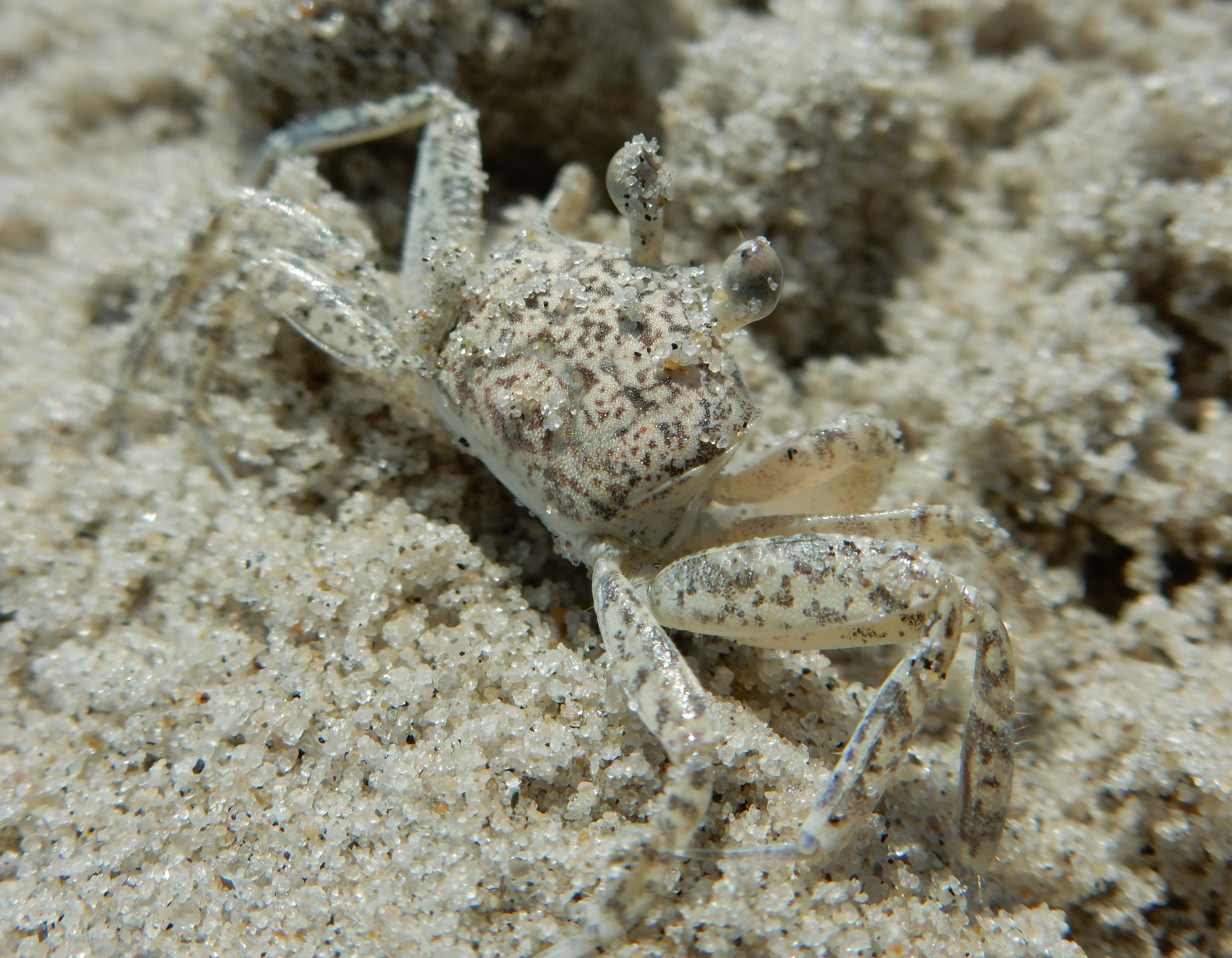
- Juvenile O. quadrata

Scientific classification
- Kingdom: Animalia
- Phylum: Arthropoda
- Clade: Pancrustacea
- Class: Malacostraca
- Order: Decapoda
- Suborder: Pleocyemata
- Infraorder: Brachyura
- Family: Ocypodidae
- Genus: Ocypode
- Species: O. quadrata

Binomial name
- Ocypode quadrata (Fabricius, 1787)

Synonyms
- Cancer Fabricius, 1787; Ocypode albicans Bosc, 1802; Monolepis inermis Say, 1817; Ocypode arenarius Say, 1817

= Atlantic ghost crab =

Species of crustacean

The Atlantic ghost crab (Ocypode quadrata) is a species of ghost crab. It is a common species along the Atlantic coast of the United States, where it is the only species of ghost crab; its range of distribution extends from its northernmost reach on beaches in Nova Scotia, Canada and Massachusetts to south along the coasts of the tropical Western Atlantic Ocean to the beach of Barra do Chui, in Rio Grande do Sul in southern Brazil.

== Description ==
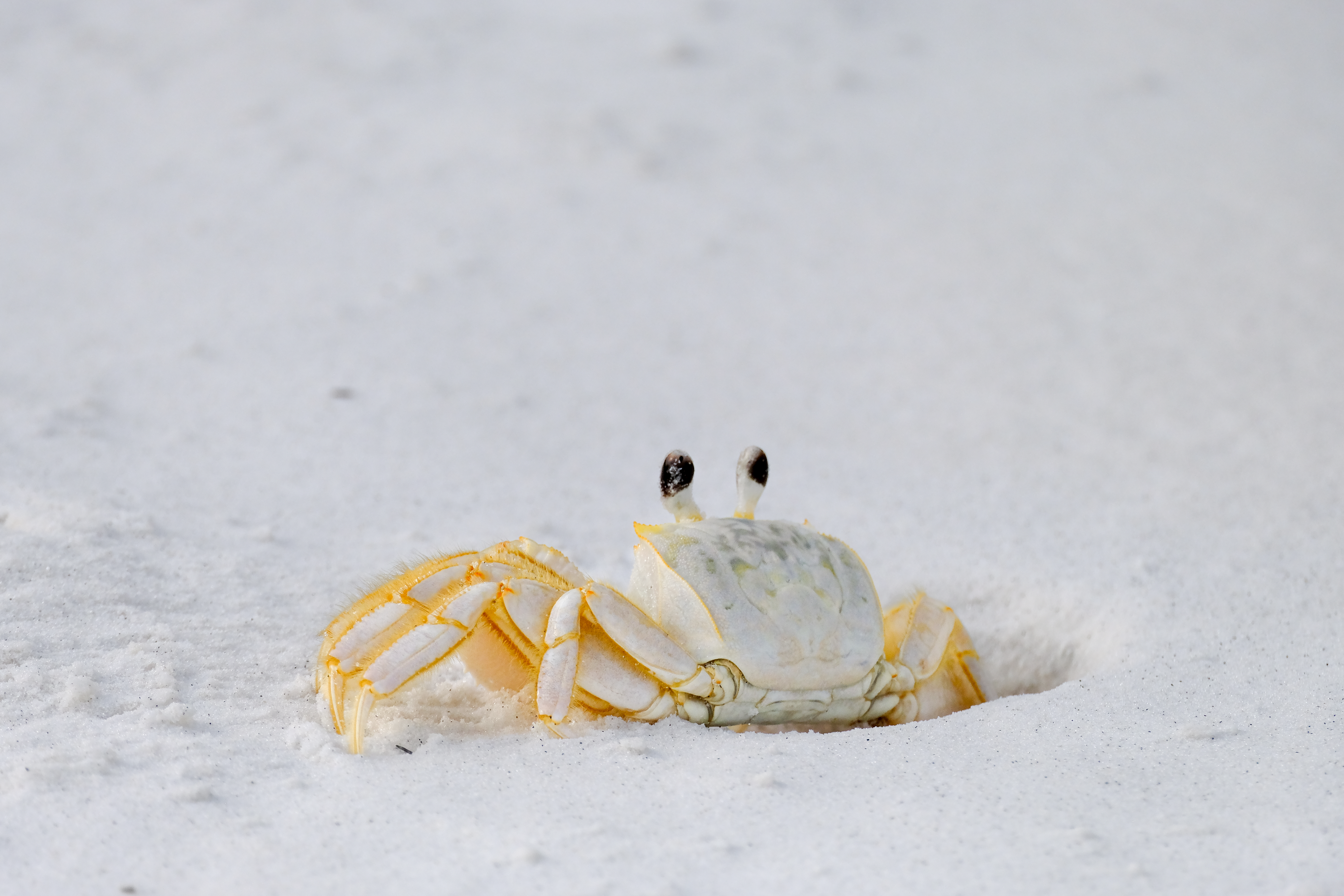
An Atlantic ghost crab on a Florida beach

Adults are grayish or the color of straw, and around 5 cm (2.0 in) wide at maturity. They must return to water periodically to moisten their gills, and when larvae must be released into the sea, but are otherwise terrestrial. Their stalked compound eyes can swivel to give them 360° vision. Young crabs are cryptically colored to blend in with their sandy habitats.

== Distribution ==
Atlantic ghost crabs are found from Santa Catarina north to Massachusetts, USA. They have been recorded in Block Island, Rhode Island, Nantucket, Massachusetts, Martha's Vineyard, Massachusetts, Delaware beaches, northern Virginia beaches, the Outer Banks of North Carolina to Santa Catarina, Brazil, on Fernando de Noronha, and Bermuda. Its planktonic larvae have been documented in Woods Hole, Massachusetts, although the adults have not been recorded at this location. The species seems to have recently become established in Nova Scotia, Canada.

== Fossil record ==
Fossil specimens of O. quadrata have been found in rocks dating from the Pleistocene.

== Ecology ==
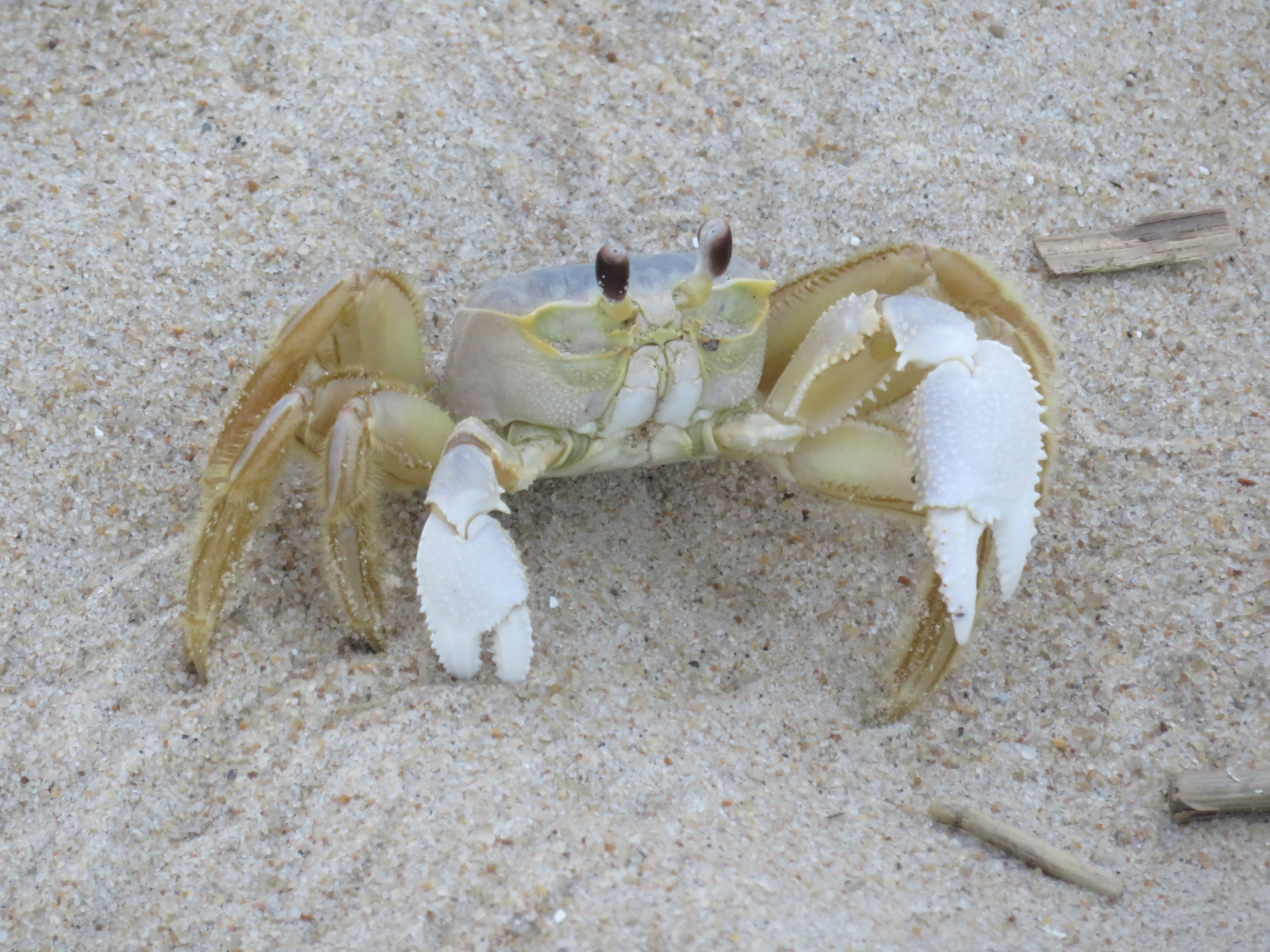
Atlantic ghost crab of Cape Henlopen State Park near Rehoboth Beach, Delaware, in 2020

The Atlantic ghost crab lives in burrows in sand above the strandline. Older individuals dig their burrows farther from the sea, some starting as much as 400 m (1,300 ft) inland. Burrows can be up to 1.3 m (4 ft 3 in) deep, and can be closed off with sand during hot periods.

This crab can produce a variety of sounds by striking the ground with the chelae (claw), by stridulation with the legs, and a growling sound from the comb-like lateral teeth of their gastric mill. Male ghost crabs participate in mating rituals not by using physical contact, but by "raising their claws and bodies in intimidating poses until one gives in and the stronger crab gets its mate".

Ghost crabs are arguably the fastest terrestrial invertebrates, capable of running at more than a meter per second (2.2 mph).

Studies on O. quadrata and its gonadal regions has revealed that, while the species can breed year-round, they have a tendency to be more active in their reproductive efforts during the summer months of the year.

O. quadrata is more active at night than in the day, and is an omnivore, eating clams (such as coquina clams and Donax spp.), mole crabs (including Emerita talpoida), insects, plant material, detritus, and even other crabs. They also feed on the eggs and hatchlings of sea turtles, such as the loggerhead sea turtle, as well as threatened and endangered shorebirds, such as the piping plover.

Sandy beaches, a habitat frequented by ghost crabs, have had a decrease in the abundance of ghost crabs due to human behavior. Ghost crabs are negatively impacted by human and vehicle trampling, which results in direct crushing of crabs, as well as indirect damage such as compression of sediment which reduces habitat suitability, interference with reproductive behaviors, reduction in food supply, and light pollution. Consequently, they may be less common on beaches frequented by people.

== Self-awareness ==
A 2023 study using the well known mirror test found that these crabs seem to be capable of recognizing themselves in a mirror. The study's author concluded that the data indicate that the crabs have "a rudimentary form of self-awareness".
