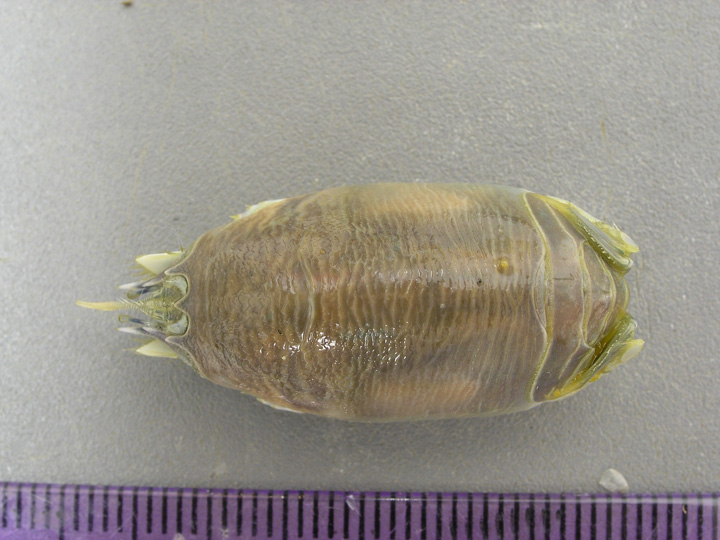

Scientific classification
- Domain: Eukaryota
- Kingdom: Animalia
- Phylum: Arthropoda
- Class: Malacostraca
- Order: Decapoda
- Suborder: Pleocyemata
- Infraorder: Anomura
- Family: Hippidae
- Genus: Emerita
- Species: E. portoricensis

Binomial name
- Emerita portoricensis Schmitt, 1935

= Puerto Rican sand crab =

Species of crustacean

The Puerto Rican sand crab, Emerita portoricensis, is a species of "sand crab" belonging to the genus Emerita, which is native to the main island of Puerto Rico and its archipelago. This species has also been found on beaches off the coast of Venezuela. The most detailed study conducted on the species was done by Miguel P. Sastre between 1988 and 1992. This investigation determined that the species has diotic traits and that there are size and survival differences between sexes. Both sexes reach sexual maturity three months after birth.

== Description ==
On average, the carapace length of males is 11mm and 19mm in females.

== Ecology ==
Puerto Rican sand crabs, along with Hippa cubensis, Emerita brasiliensis, and Lepidora richmondi inhabit the sandy beaches of Golfo Triste in Venezuela. Using their uropods, they dig into the sand, primarily in the surf zone. As filter feeders, they use their antennae to catch detritus and plankton caught in the waves.

This species is also a good bioindicator for mercury levels in the water. In one study, mercury levels in E. portoricensis tended to be higher when compared to the sediment samples around it.

== See also ==
- Fauna of Puerto Rico
- List of endemic fauna of Puerto Rico
