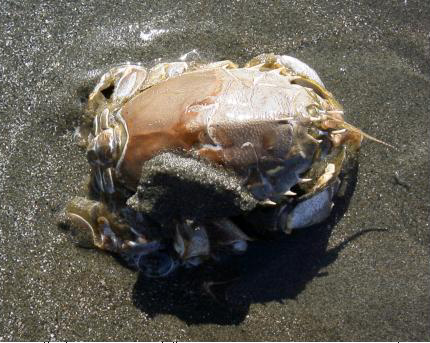

Scientific classification
- Kingdom: Animalia
- Phylum: Arthropoda
- Class: Malacostraca
- Order: Decapoda
- Suborder: Pleocyemata
- Infraorder: Anomura
- Family: Blepharipodidae
- Genus: Blepharipoda
- Species: B. occidentalis

Binomial name
- Blepharipoda occidentalis J. W. Randall, 1840

= Blepharipoda occidentalis =

Species of crustacean

Blepharipoda occidentalis, the spiny sand crab or spiny mole crab, is a species of sand crab or mole crab which lives in the eastern Pacific Ocean, from Puget Sound to Baja California. It is oval in shape, growing up to 3 inches (76 mm) long and 1.75 in (44 mm) wide. It lives on sandy beaches up to 30 metres (98 ft) under water, and feeds on the remains of other sand crabs that live in the area.
