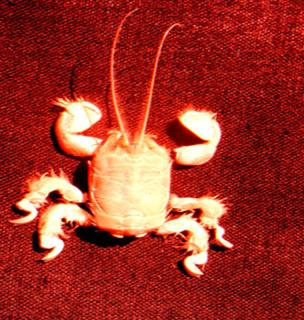
- Albunea carabus

Scientific classification
- Domain: Eukaryota
- Kingdom: Animalia
- Phylum: Arthropoda
- Class: Malacostraca
- Order: Decapoda
- Suborder: Pleocyemata
- Infraorder: Anomura
- Family: Albuneidae
- Subfamily: Albuneinae
- Genus: Albunea; Weber, 1795

= Albunea (crustacean) =

Genus of crustaceans

Albunea is a genus of mole crab within the family Albuneidae. Little is known about this group's biology. A. groeningi is named after Matt Groening, creator of The Simpsons.

The genus Albunea contains the following species:

- Albunea asymmetrica (Müller, 1979) †
- Albunea bulla Boyko, 2002
- Albunea carabus (Linnaeus, 1758)
- Albunea catherinae Boyko, 2002
- Albunea cuisiana Beschin & De Angeli, 1984 †
- Albunea danai Boyko, 1999
- Albunea elegans A. Milne-Edwards & Bouvier, 1898
- Albunea elioti Benedict, 1904
- Albunea galapagensis Boyko, 2002
- Albunea gibbesii Stimpson, 1859
- Albunea groeningi Boyko, 2002
- Albunea hahnae Blow & Manning, 1996 †
- Albunea holthuisi Boyko & Harvey, 1999
- Albunea lucasia de Saussure, 1853
- Albunea marquisiana Boyko, 2000
- Albunea microps Miers, 1878
- Albunea occulta Boyko, 2002
- Albunea okinawaensis Osawa & Fujita, 2007
- Albunea paretii Guérin-Méneville, 1853
- Albunea speciosa Dana, 1852
- Albunea steinitzi Holthuis, 1958
- Albunea symmysta (Linnaeus, 1758)
- Albunea thurstoni Henderson, 1893
- Albunea turritellacola Fraaije, van Bakel & Jagt, 2008 †
