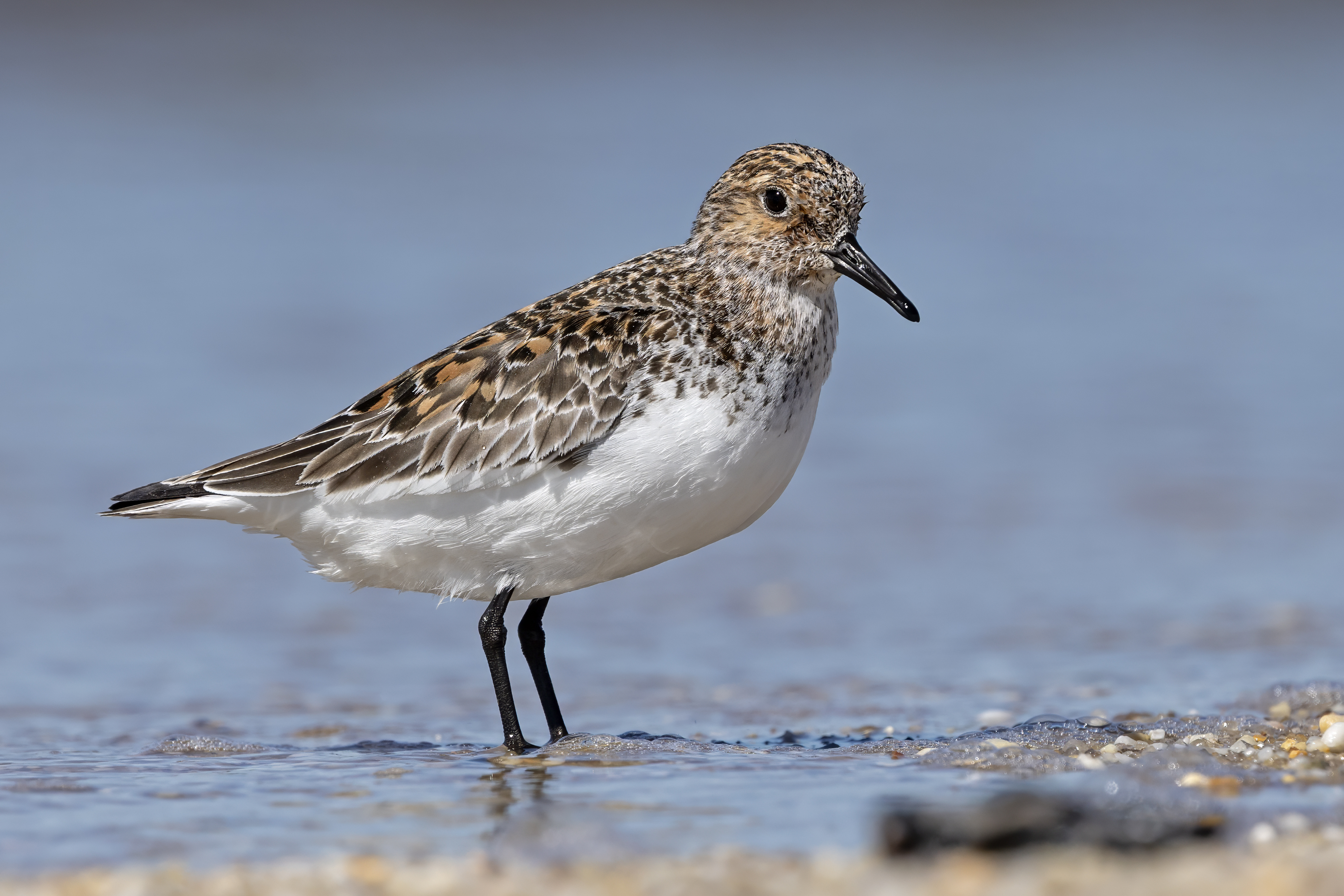
- Breeding plumage, Heislerville Wildlife Management Area, New Jersey
- Winter plumage, Hesilerville WMA, New Jersey

Conservation status
- Least Concern (IUCN 3.1)

Scientific classification
- Kingdom: Animalia
- Phylum: Chordata
- Class: Aves
- Order: Charadriiformes
- Family: Scolopacidae
- Genus: Calidris
- Species: C. alba

Binomial name
- Calidris alba (Pallas, 1764)
- Breeding Migration Nonbreeding

Synonyms
- Charadrius calidris Linnaeus, 1766; Crocethia alba (Pallas, 1764) (Note: Kirwan et al. (2008) in The Birds of Turkey spell this alternative genus Crocerthia); Erolia alba (Pallas, 1764)

= Sanderling =

Species of bird

Sanderlings in Kanagawa, Japan

The sanderling (Calidris alba) is a small wading bird. It is a circumpolar Arctic breeder, being among the most extreme northern breeding birds in the world, nesting only on the coldest tundra, north of the 5°C July isotherm; in Europe, its southernmost breeding locality is Svalbard, where only a handful (5–15) pairs breed. It is a long-distance migrant, wintering south to South America, western and southern Europe, Africa, and Australia. It is highly gregarious in winter, sometimes forming large flocks on coastal mudflats or sandy beaches.

It is somewhat unlike other small sandpipers in appearance, in particular in lacking a hind toe, which has led to the suggestion that it should be placed into a monotypic genus Crocethia. More recent reviews indicate that the sanderling is a fairly typical "stint" or small sandpiper and should be retained along with the knots and other relatives in the genus Calidris.

This bird is similar in size to a dunlin, but stouter, with a thick bill. It shows a strong white wingbar in flight, and runs along the sandy beaches it prefers with a characteristic "bicycling" action of its legs, stopping frequently to pick small food items. It eats small crabs and other small invertebrates. In spring, birds migrating north from South America consume large numbers of horseshoe crab eggs in the Delaware Bay area.

In spring, the birds arrive on their High Arctic breeding grounds (see map) at the end of May or in early June, where they lay 3–4 eggs in a ground scrape from mid June to mid July. On the nesting grounds, these birds mainly eat insects and some plant material.

The sanderling was described by the German naturalist Peter Simon Pallas in 1764 and given the binomial name Trynga alba.

The sanderling is one of the species to which the Agreement on the Conservation of African-Eurasian Migratory Waterbirds (AEWA) applies.

== Description ==
The sanderling is a small plump sandpiper, 18–20 cm (7–8 in) in length. Its weight ranges from 40–100 g (1 1/2–3 1/2 oz). The winter bird is very pale, almost white apart from a dark shoulder patch. This is the source of the specific name, alba, which is the Latin for "white". Later in the summer, the face and throat become brick-red. The juvenile bird is spangled black and white, and shows much more contrast than the adult.

Standard Measurements
length	180–220 mm (7.1–8.7 in)
wingspan	430 mm (17 in)
weight	60 g (2.1 oz)
wing	114.5–121.6 mm (4.51–4.79 in)
tail	47.3–53 mm (1.86–2.09 in)
culmen	22.5–26.6 mm (0.89–1.05 in)
tarsus	23.5–25.8 mm (0.93–1.02 in)

If its size is misjudged, a sanderling in breeding plumage can be mistaken for some varieties of stint, or a sanderling in winter plumage can be mistaken for a dunlin or red knot. It can be told from other small wading birds, given good views, by its lack of a hind toe. Its behaviour is also distinctive.

== Distribution, habitat and migration ==
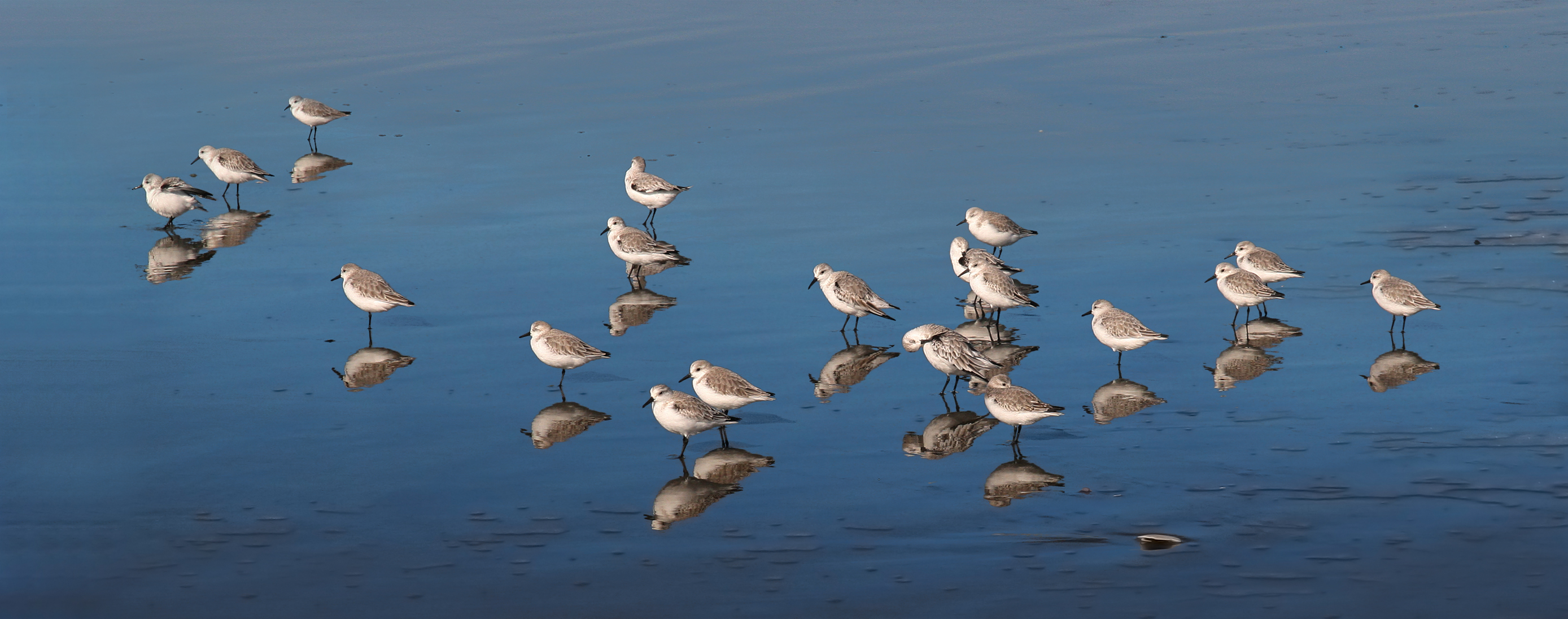
Sanderlings at Ocean Beach, San Francisco

The sanderling breeds in the High Arctic areas of North America, Europe and Asia. In North America, it breeds in the Canadian Arctic Archipelago, Nunavut, Greenland (and to a lesser extent Alaska). In Eurasia, it breeds in Spitsbergen and areas of northern Russia from the Taymyr Peninsula to the New Siberian Islands. In the northern winter, it has a nearly cosmopolitan distribution across the world's marine coasts. It is a complete migrant, travelling between 3,000 to 10,000 km (2,000 to 6,000 mi) from its breeding grounds to its wintering sites. Birds that travel further also arrive later and leave sooner. Most adults leave the breeding grounds in July and early August, whereas juvenile birds leave in late August and early September. The northward migration begins in March at the southern end of their winter distribution.

The breeding habitat of the sanderling is coastal tundra north of 5 °C (41 °F) July isotherm. The species typically chooses nesting sites on dry stony areas near wet areas, from 60 to 800 m (200 to 2,600 ft) above sea level. During the winter and its migration, it is most commonly found on coastal sandy beaches, but also occurs on tidal sand flats, mud flats and the shores of lakes and rivers. More infrequently, it may occur on rocky shores.

== Taxonomy and etymology ==
The sanderling's name derives from the Old English sand-yrðling, "sand-ploughman". The genus name is from Ancient Greek: καλίδρις : kalídris or σκαλίδρις : skalídris, a term used by Aristotle for some grey-coloured waterside birds. The species name, alba, is Latin for "white".

The sanderling consists of two subspecies:

- C. a. alba, (Pallas, 1764), breeds on Ellesmere Island, north & east Greenland, Svalbard, Franz Josef Land and the Taymyr Peninsula
- C. a. rubida, (Gmelin, 1789), breeds in northeast Siberia, Alaska and northern Canada

== Behaviour ==
=== Feeding behaviour ===
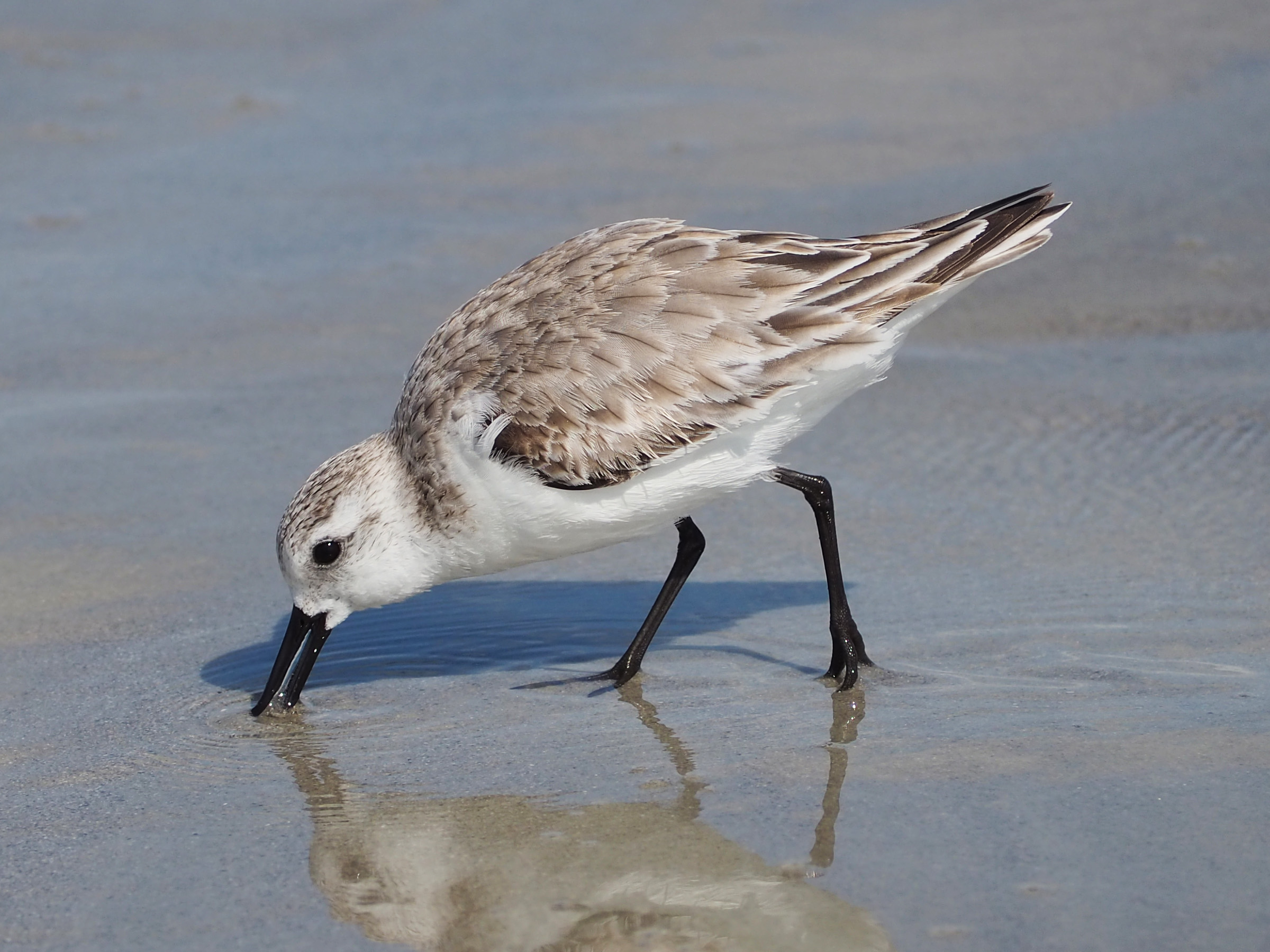
Sanderling feeding

Sanderlings feed on invertebrate prey buried in the sand in the upper intertidal zone. In North America, this diet largely consists of the isopods Excirolana linguifrons, Excirolana kincaidii, and the mole crab, Emerita analoga. When the tide is out, these crustaceans live in burrows some way beneath the surface. When the tide comes in, they move into the upper layers of sand and feed on the plankton and detritus that washes over them with each wave. They then burrow rapidly down again as the water retreats. They leave no marks on the surface, so the sanderlings hunt for them by plunging their beaks into the sand at random, consuming whatever they find. Their bills can penetrate only 2 or 3 cm (0.79 or 1.18 in) and as the water swirls around and retreats, the sand is softer; this makes it easier for the birds' beaks to penetrate further. In the spring, when much breeding activity is taking place in the benthic community, there may be as many as 4000 invertebrates per square metre, but their average size is smaller than later in the year. The birds appear to rush madly around at the edge of the surf, but in reality they are maximising their chances of catching as many prey animals as possible when they are at their most vulnerable near the surface.

=== Breeding behaviour ===
At breeding time sanderlings are territorial, with the male aggressively defending its territory. They may either form monogamous pairs or polyandrous (one female and two male) pairings.

== Health and diseases ==
In 2024, a mortality event affecting sanderlings was documented along the Atlantic coast of the United States, notably in Virginia, caused by the clade 2.3.4.4b highly pathogenic avian influenza (H5N1). Infected individuals showed severe lesions in the brain and pancreas, leading to rapid death. This was one of the few detailed records of avian influenza pathology in migratory shorebirds.

== Gallery ==
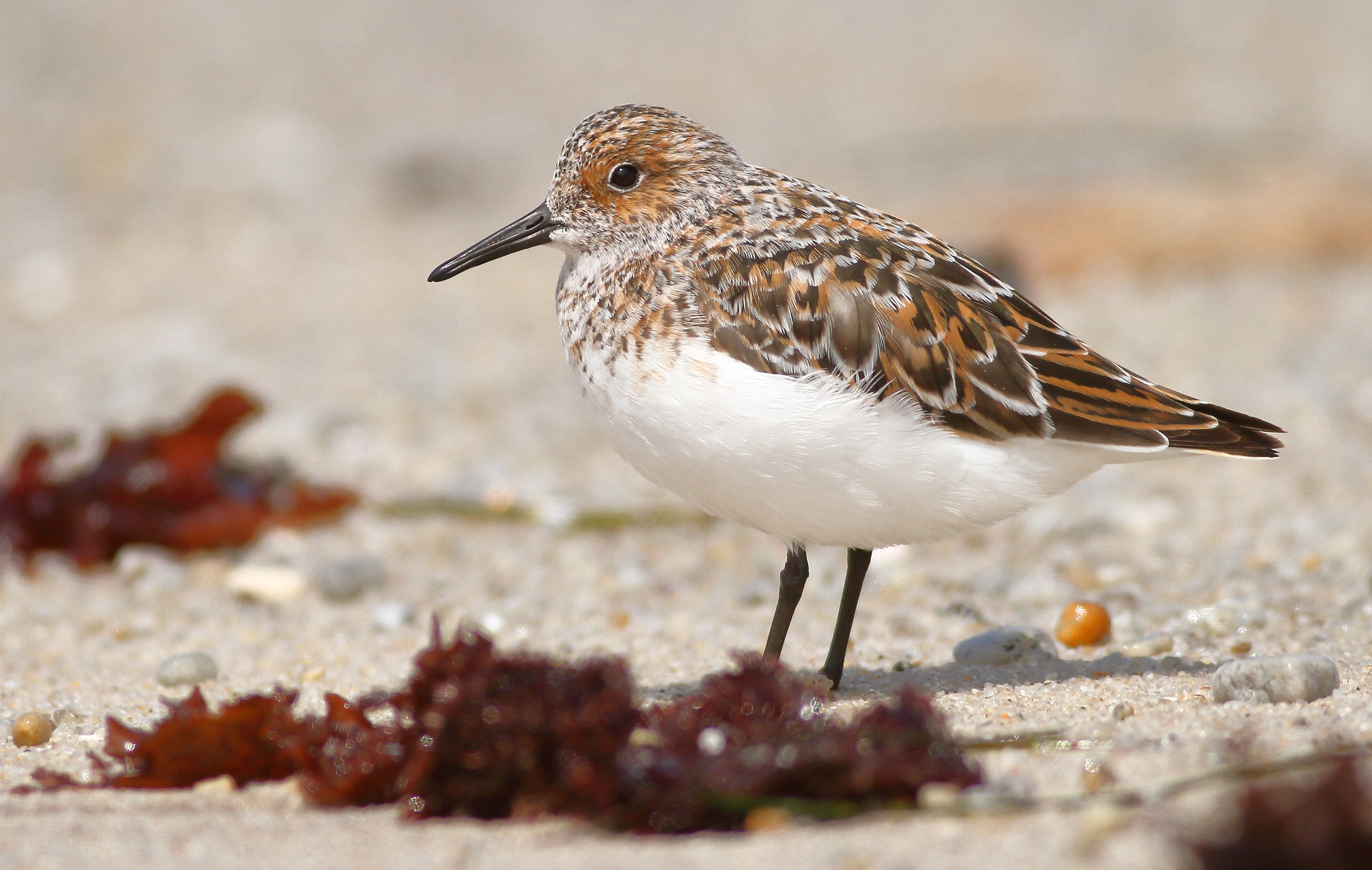
Sanderling in Monterey, California

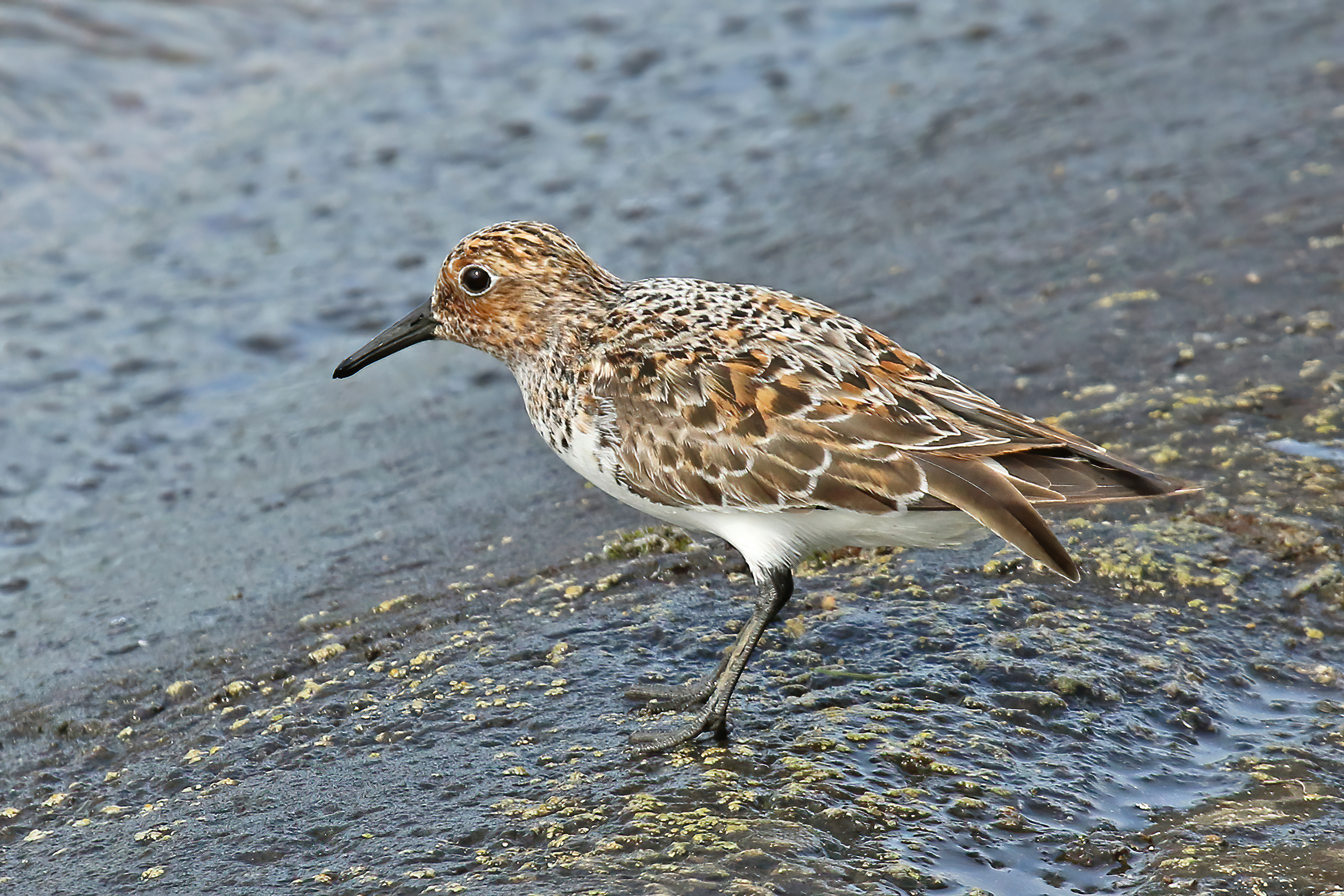
Breeding plumage, Farmoor Reservoir, Oxfordshire

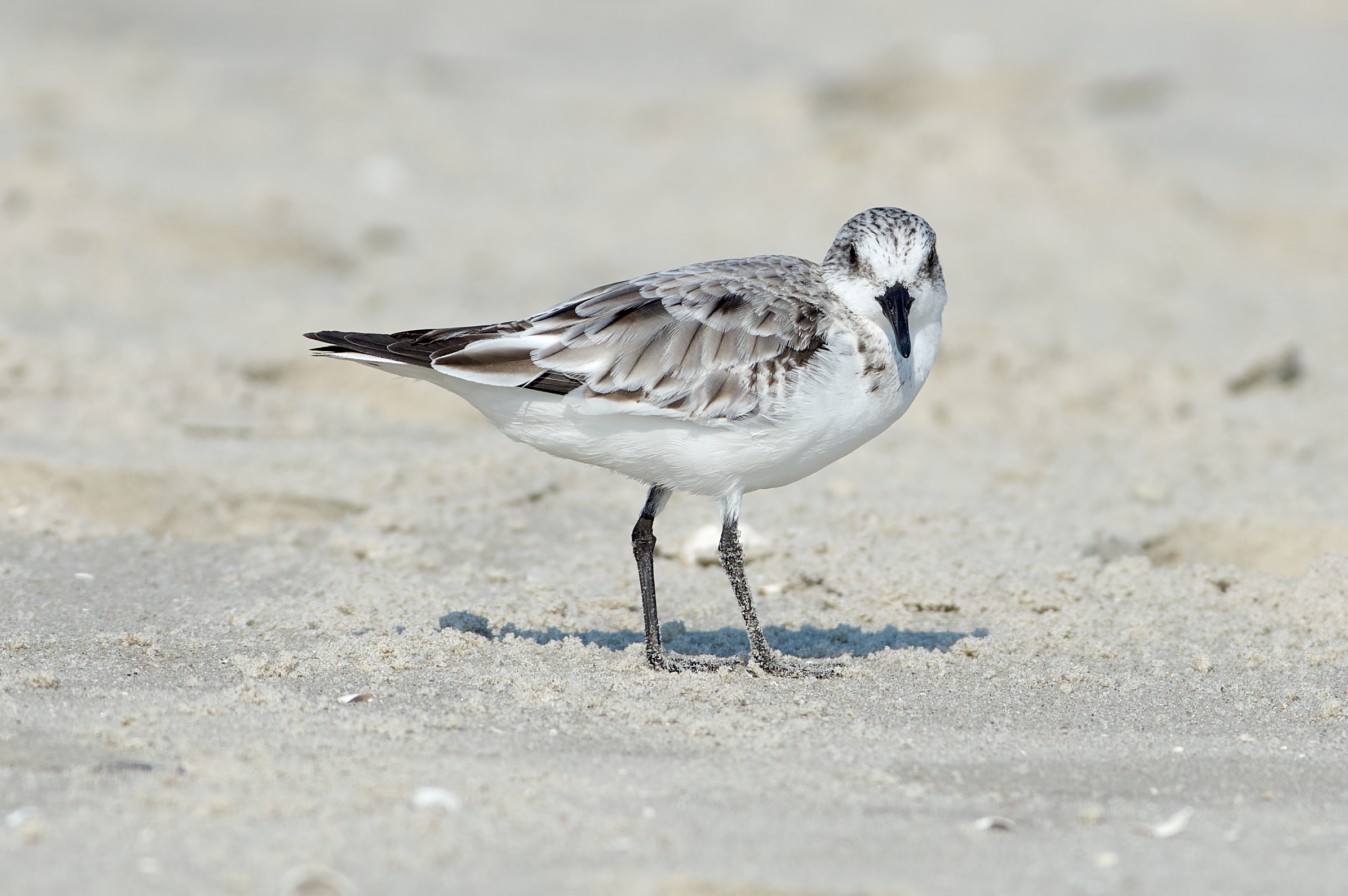
Sanderling on the island of Amrum, Schleswig-Holstein

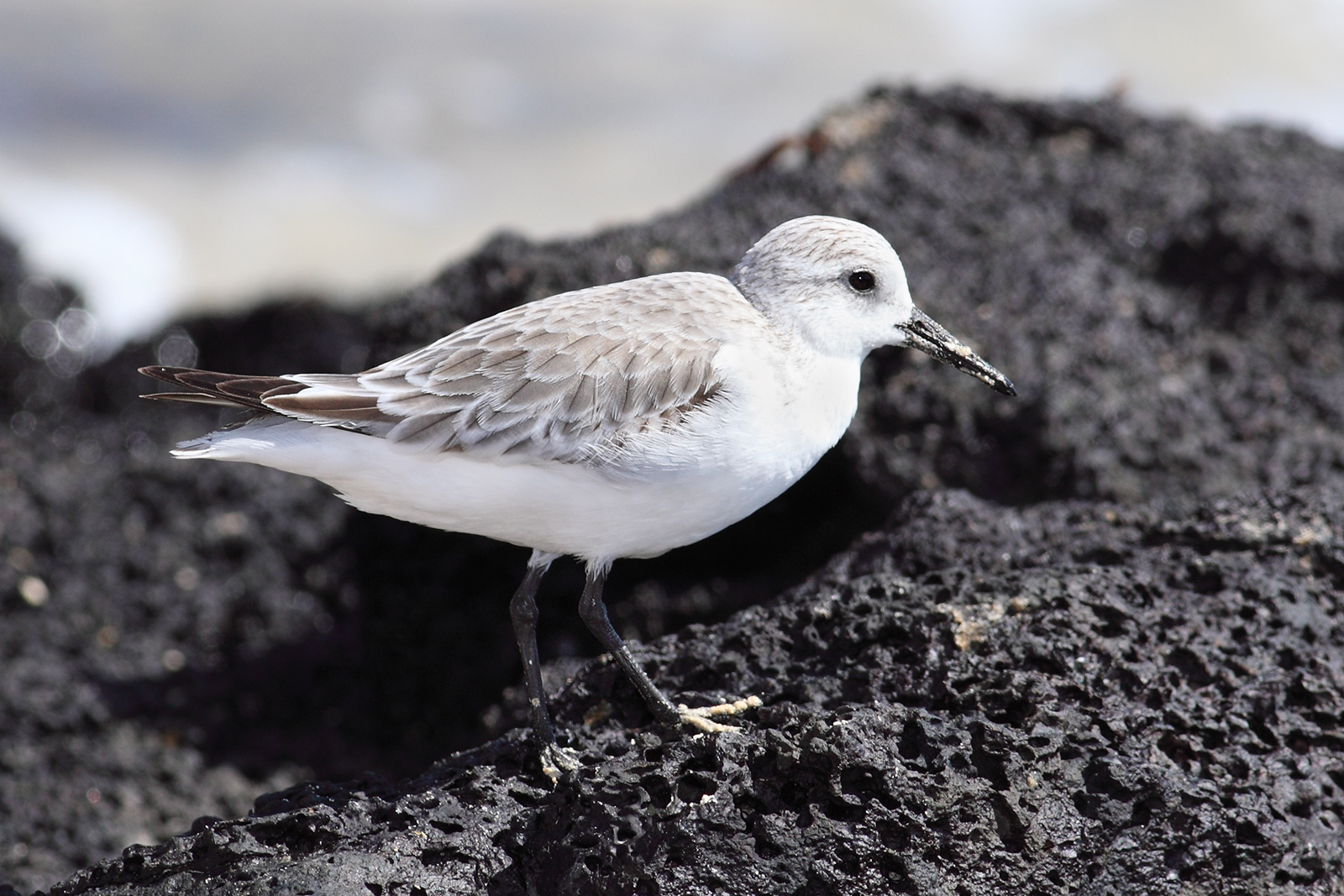
Floreana Island, Galapagos Islands

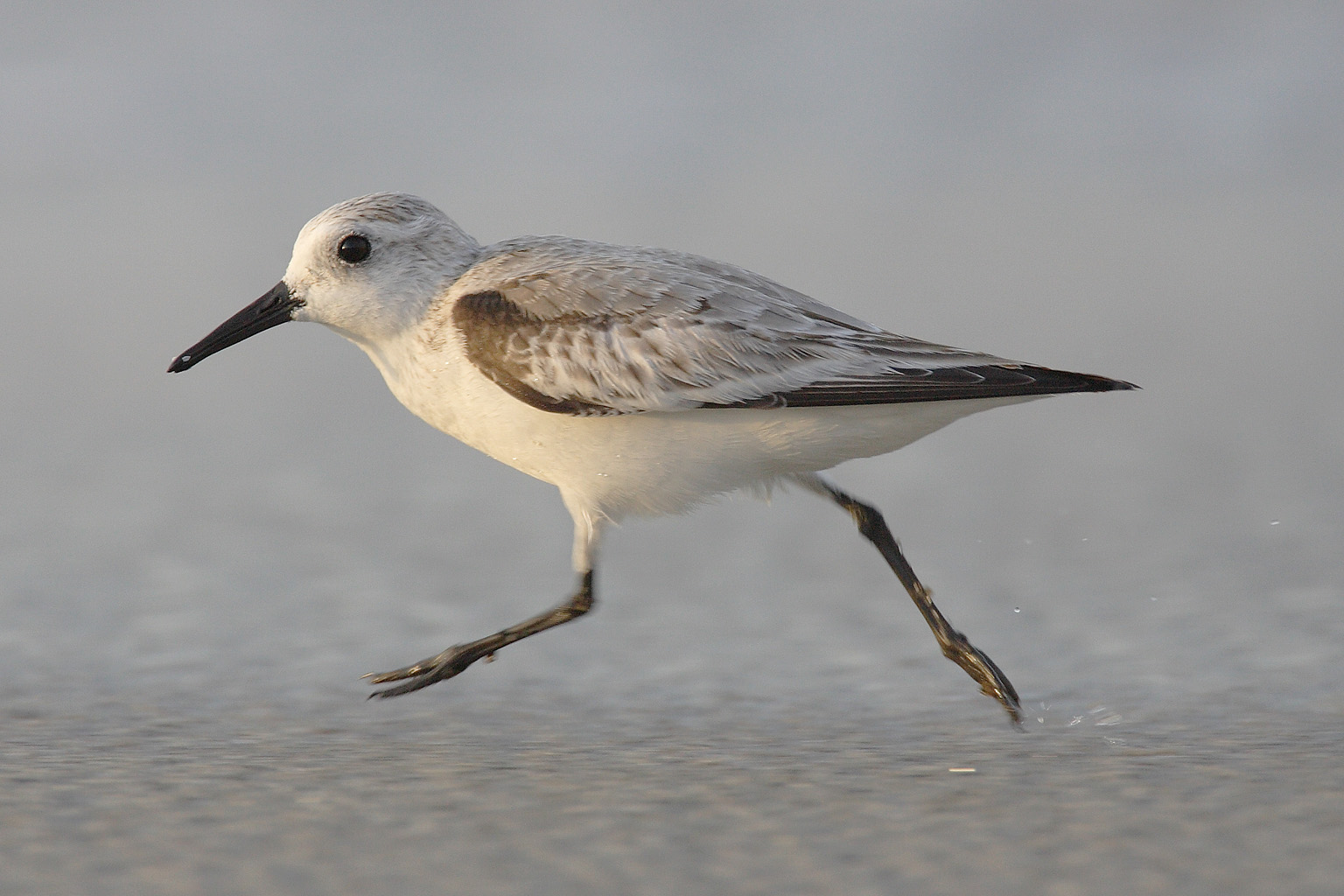
Running

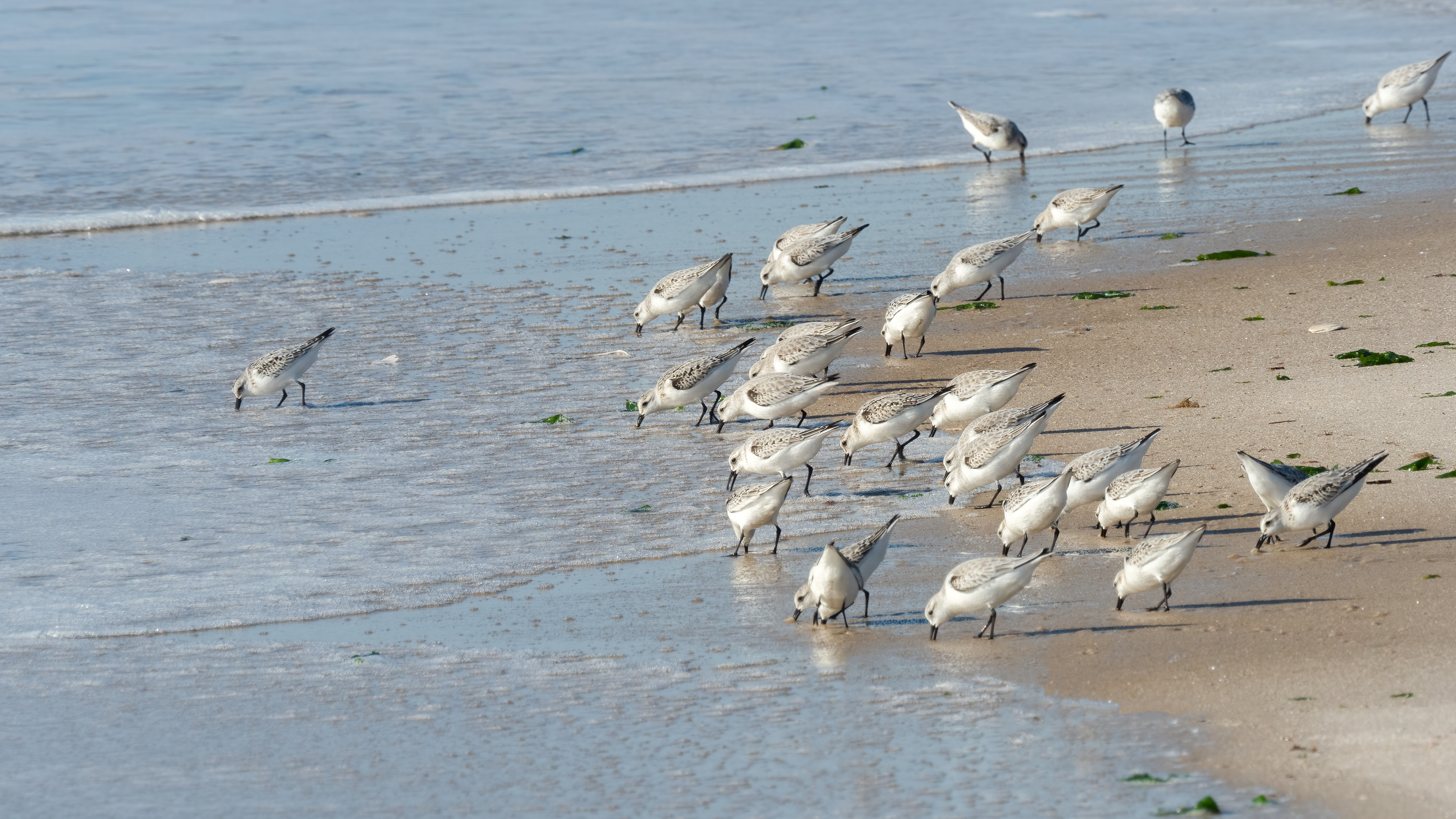
Sanderlings feeding in Quogue, New York

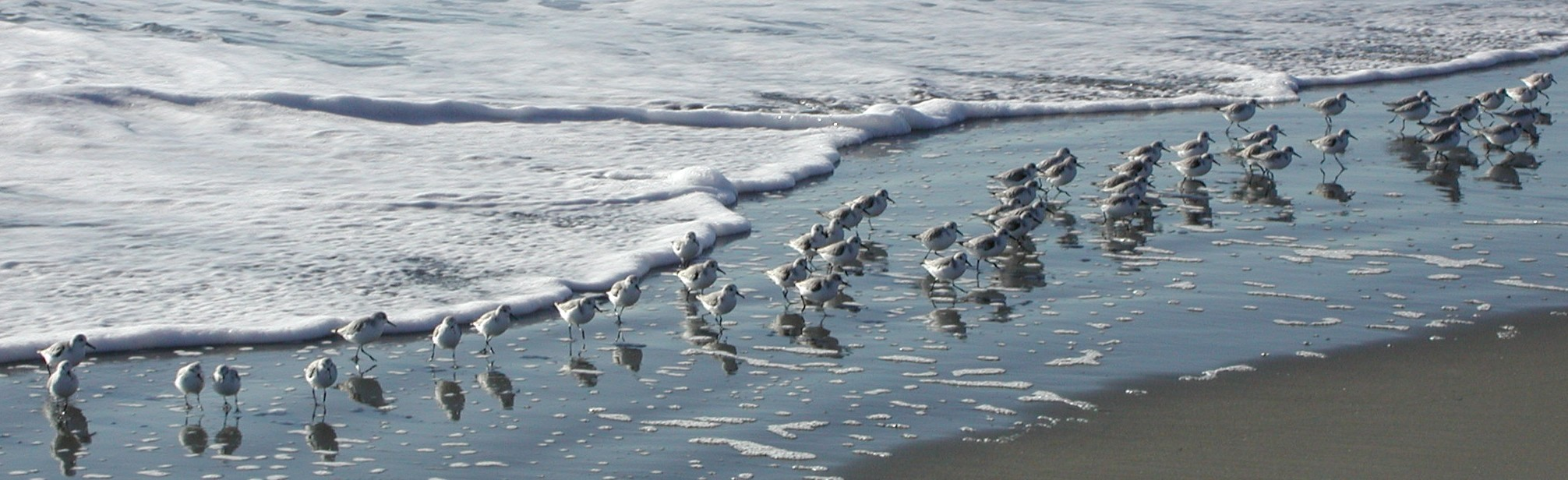
A flock displaying their distinctive behaviour of running with the ebb and flow of waves (while feeding). Willapa Bay, near Tokeland, Washington.

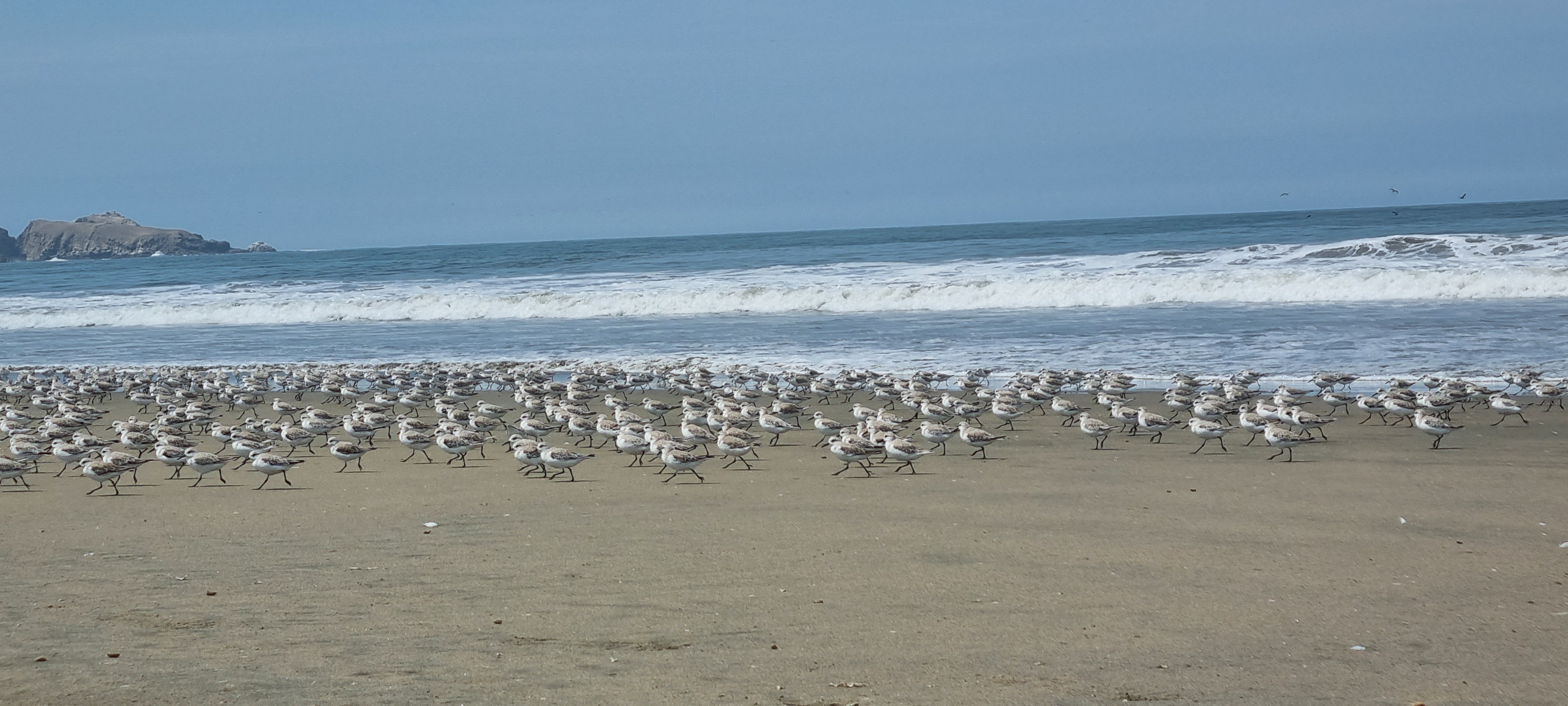
A large flock Sanderlings Running in Lima, Peru

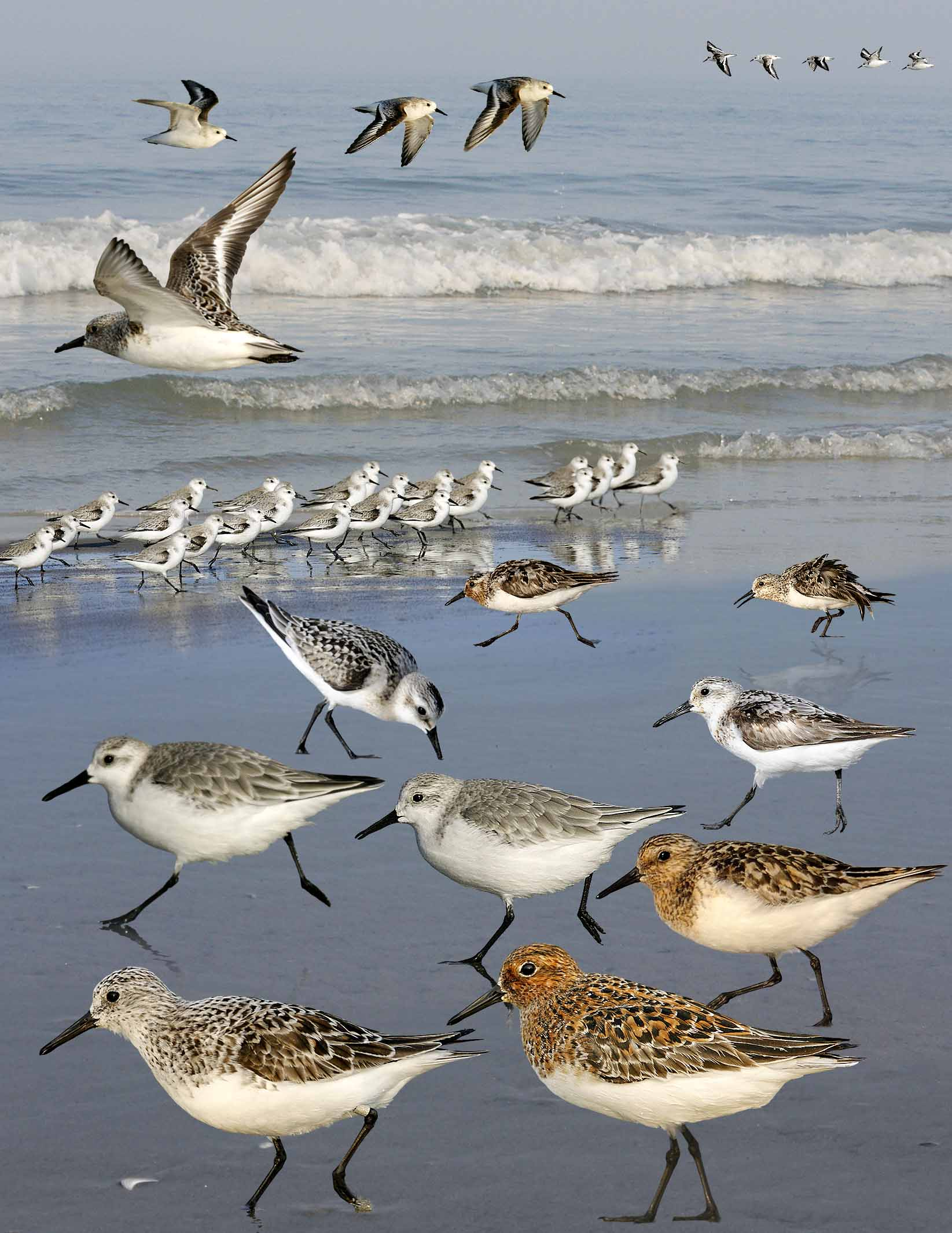
ID composite

== Notes ==
=== References ===
- Kirwan, Guy; Demirci, Barbaros; Welch, Hilary; Boyla, Kerem; Özen, Metehan; Castell, Peter; Marlow, Tim (2008). The Birds of Turkey. Helm. ISBN 978-1-4081-0475-0.
