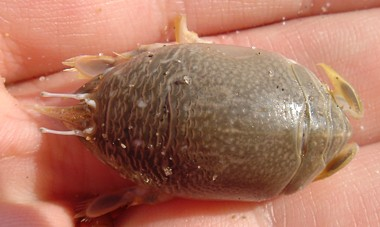

Scientific classification
- Domain: Eukaryota
- Kingdom: Animalia
- Phylum: Arthropoda
- Class: Malacostraca
- Order: Decapoda
- Suborder: Pleocyemata
- Infraorder: Anomura
- Family: Hippidae
- Genus: Emerita
- Species: E. analoga

Binomial name
- Emerita analoga (Stimpson, 1857)

Synonyms
- Hippa analoga Stimpson, 1857; Hippa chilensis Philippi, 1860 – nomen nudum

= Emerita analoga =

Species of crustacean

Emerita analoga, the Pacific sand crab, Pacific mole crab or coldwater mole crab, is a species of small, sand-burrowing decapod crustacean found living in the sand along the temperate western coasts of North and South America. It is found on exposed sandy beaches in the swash region of the intertidal zone.

== Description ==
The Pacific sand crab is a small crustacean growing up to 35 mm (1.4 in) long and 25 mm (1.0 in) wide. The female is nearly twice as large as the male and can often be identified by the orange egg mass carried under the telson. The adult is sand-coloured and well camouflaged, and has no claws or spines. It has five pairs of legs and three pairs of pleopods. Sand crabs moult periodically, so their exoskeletons may be found washed up on the beach.

The sand crab is well adapted to life in the sand, which presents an unstable substrate, and its shape is an elongated dome shape designed for fast burrowing. The eyes are on long stalks and the antennules are also elongated so as to project above the surface of the sand. These form a tube which channels water downwards through the gills. The much longer antennae are retractable. When water is overhead, they also project above the sand surface to collect food particles. The legs and uropods have hairy margins to assist in digging and for use in collecting food and transferring it to the mouth.

== Distribution ==
The sand crab occurs in North America from Alaska to Baja California and in South America, where it is found from Salaverry, Peru, southwards to around Cape Horn and into southern Argentina. The species is common on the beaches of California, but greater changes in population levels occur further north, probably as a result of variations in the coastal currents which in some years passively disperse the planktonic larval stages northwards. In Oregon, the populations seem not to be self-sustaining and recruitment is largely from larvae originating in California. There is an established population of sand crabs on the Twin Harbors Peninsula of Washington state.

On any particular beach, the distribution of sand crabs from one part to another can vary greatly for reasons not fully understood. Females tend to be found far down the beach, whereas males and immature crabs are found at higher levels.

== Biology ==
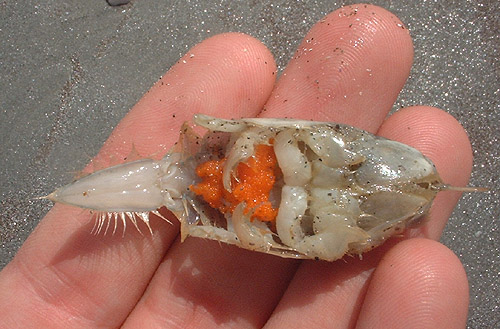
Underside of female sand crab with eggs

The sand crab always moves backwards when burrowing or crawling. It can also swim (backwards) and tread water using its back legs. It is a suspension feeder. It burrows backwards into the sand and faces the sea. As each wave retreats, it extends its antennae and catches floating organisms. It then retracts the antennae and scrapes the particles into its mouth. It can do this several times per wave. When it becomes uncovered by water, it coils its antennae and burrows backwards deeper into the sand. The diet is plankton, mostly consisting of dinoflagellates.

The sand crab mates in spring and summer. The female lays batches of up to 45,000 eggs each month and carries them about beneath her abdomen tucked under her telson. The eggs hatch in about four weeks. The larvae have five planktonic zoeal stages and a final megalopal stage. The zoeal stages last up to 130 days. The megalopae settle out onto sandy beaches where they moult and develop into juveniles, which mature into adults within a few weeks. The long planktonic stage means that the larvae can become widely dispersed and colonize new areas. The adults reproduce in both their first and second summers and most die in the autumn of their second year.

== Ecology ==
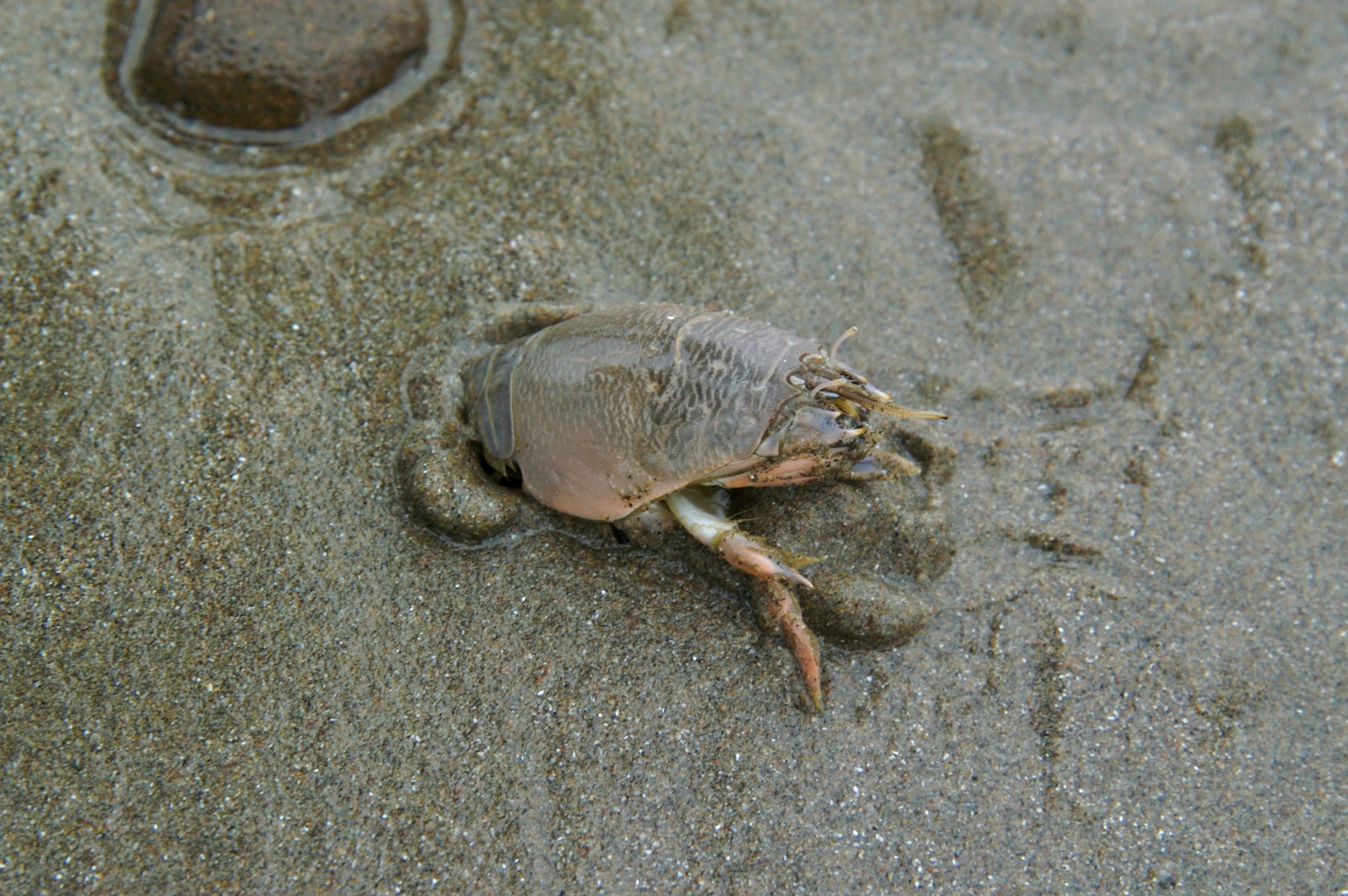
Sand crab burrowing back into the sand

The sand crab lives under the surface of the sand, moving up and down the beach according to the state of the tide. As each wave advances and retreats, the crab comes to the surface and extends its antennae to feed. This makes it vulnerable to predatory birds such as the sanderling. These birds actively patrol the part of the beach washed by incoming waves, probing the softened sand with their bills. The sand crab retreats under the sand surface as each wave goes out, maximizing its chance of being out of reach of the bird's beak. The bird maximizes its chance of feeding on sand crabs by scurrying at the edge of the surf.

Other birds that eat sand crabs include willets, godwits, surf scoters, blackbellied plovers, and curlews. The crabs are hosts to the intermediate stages of various parasitic worms, like acanthocephalans. These are passed on to predators when the predators eat the crabs, and if enough worms are ingested, they have been known to kill the predator.

The barred surfperch (Amphistichus argenteus), found off the coast of California, consumes a large number of sand crabs. Surf fishermen use the crabs for bait and commercial bait fisheries extract them from the beach. The sand crabs with soft shells that have just moulted are kept for bait, while the hard-shelled crabs are thrown back into the sea.

The sand crab has been evaluated as an indicator species for monitoring the level of domoic acid-synthesizing diatoms (Pseudo-nitzschia spp.) which sometimes cause toxic blooms off the coast of California.
