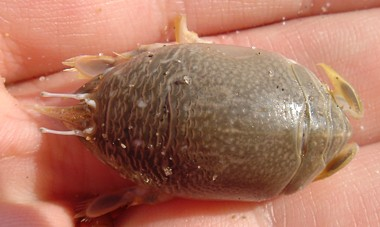
- Female Emerita analoga

Scientific classification
- Kingdom: Animalia
- Phylum: Arthropoda
- Clade: Pancrustacea
- Class: Malacostraca
- Order: Decapoda
- Suborder: Pleocyemata
- Infraorder: Anomura
- Family: Hippidae
- Genus: Emerita; Scopoli, 1777

Type species
- Cancer emeritus Linnaeus, 1767

= Emerita (crustacean) =

Genus of crustaceans

Emerita is a small genus of decapod crustaceans, known as mole crabs, sand fleas or sand crabs. These small animals burrow in the sand in the swash zone and use their antennae for filter feeding.

== Description ==
Emerita has a barrel-shaped body. It has a tough exoskeleton and can hold its appendages close to the body, allowing it to roll in the tidal currents and waves. It has feathery antennae, which are used to filter plankton and detritus from the swash.

Males are typically smaller than females, and in some species, such as Emerita rathbunae, the minute males live attached to the legs of the female. Females are around 8–37 mm (0.31–1.46 in) in carapace length, depending on the species, while males vary from a similar size to females in E. austroafricana, down to 2.5 mm (0.098 in) carapace length in E. rathbunae and E. talpoida.

== Distribution ==
The genus as a whole has a broad distribution in tropical and subtropical regions. Most individual species, however, are restricted to smaller areas, and their ranges rarely overlap. The genus is common on both coasts of the United States and along the Atlantic coast of Africa; the related genus Hippa is found across the Indo-Pacific, including Australia.

== Species ==
Twelve species are recognised: (Note: Distributions follow Haye et al. (2003).)

- Emerita almeidai (Mantelatto et al, 2023) – eastern Brazil
- Emerita analoga (Stimpson, 1857) – western North America and western South America
- Emerita austroafricana (Schmitt, 1937) – southeastern Africa and Madagascar
- Emerita benedicti (Schmitt, 1935) – Gulf of Mexico
- Emerita brasiliensis (Schmitt, 1935) – southeastern Brazil and northeastern Brazil
- Emerita emeritus (Linnaeus, 1767) – South Asia and Southeast Asia
- Emerita holthuisi (Sankolli, 1965) – western India, Persian Gulf, and Red Sea
- Emerita karachiensis (Niazi & Haque, 1974) – Pakistan
- Emerita portoricensis (Schmitt, 1935) – Caribbean Sea
- Emerita rathbunae (Schmitt, 1935) – western Central America
- Emerita taiwanensis (Hsueh, 2015) – Taiwan
- Emerita talpoida (Say, 1817) – eastern North America and South America

The Old World species had been widely thought to form a monophyletic group, as did the New World species. The use of molecular phylogenetics has shown, however, that E. analoga, a species living along the Pacific coast of North America, is more closely related to African species than it is to other New World species.

== Taxonomy ==
The genus Emerita was erected by Giovanni Antonio Scopoli in his 1777 work Introductio ad Historiam Naturalem. The type species is Cancer emeritus (now E. emeritus), because at one time, it was the only species in the genus. Other genera with the same name have been rejected for nomenclatural purposes; these were published by Laurens Theodorus Gronovius (1764) and Friedrich Christian Meuschen (1778 and 1781).

== Ecology and behaviour ==
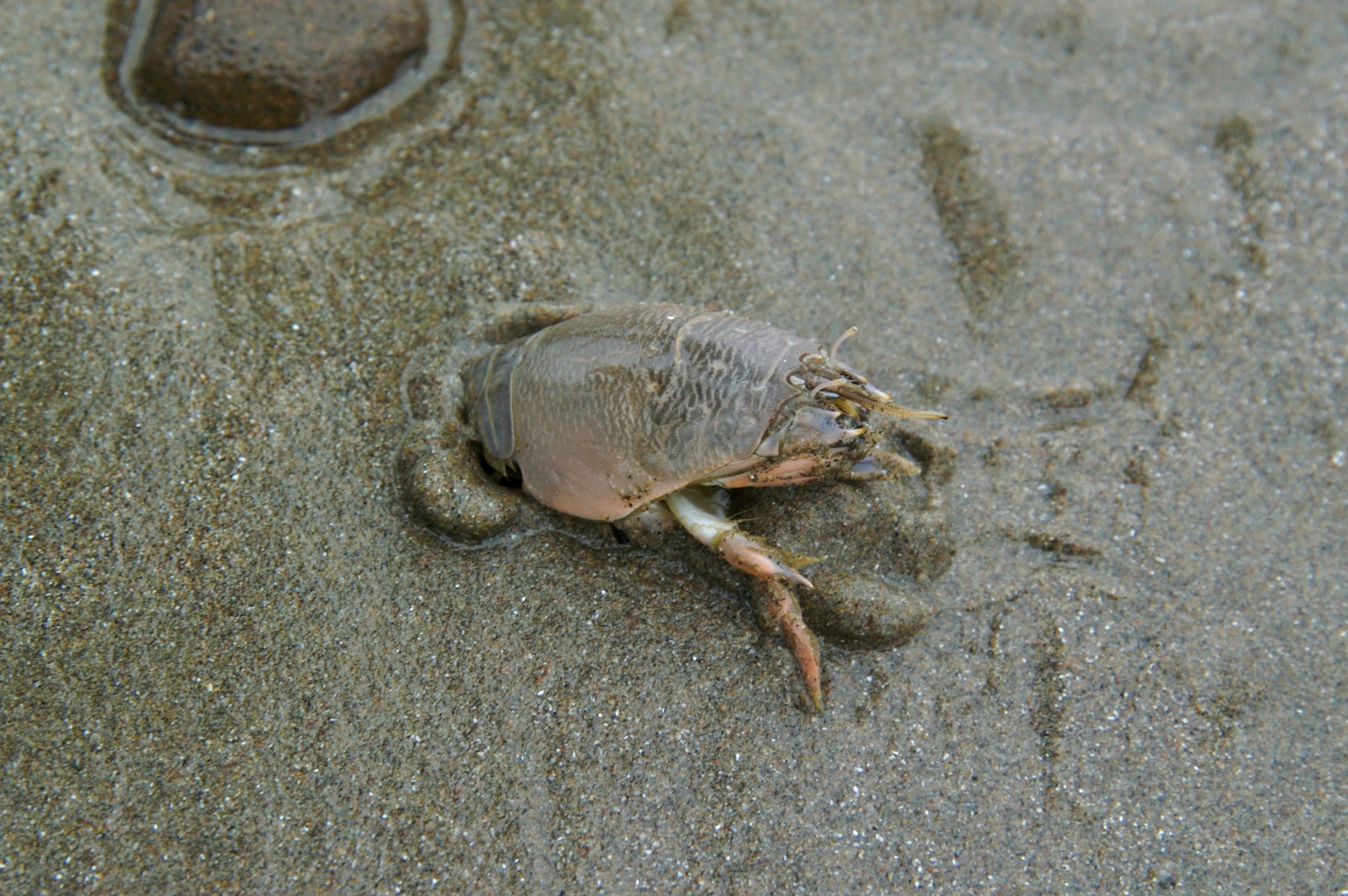
E. analoga digging in the sand

Emerita is adept at burrowing, and is capable of burying itself completely in 1.5 seconds. Unlike mud shrimp, Emerita burrows tail-first into the sand, using the pereiopods to scrape the sand from underneath its body. During this action, the carapace is pressed into the sand as anchorage for the digging limbs. The digging requires the sand to be fluidised by wave action, and Emerita must bury itself in the correct orientation before the wave has passed to be safe from predators.

As the tide changes, Emerita changes its position on the beach; most individuals stay in the zone of breaking waves. This may be detected by the physical characteristics of the sand. As the tide falls, the sand is allowed to settle; when Emerita detects this, it uses the temporary liquefaction from a breaking wave to emerge from its burrow, and is carried down the beach by the wave action. Longshore drift may also drag Emerita laterally along a beach.

The main predators of Emerita are fish; in the eastern Pacific Ocean, the barred surfperch (Amphistichus argenteus) is particularly important. Seabirds also eat Emerita, but do not appear to target the aggregations of mole crabs. Carcasses of Emerita provide an important food source for the closely related scavenger Blepharipoda.

== Relationship to humans ==
Due to the Emerita being the predominant diet of the barred surfperch, surf fishermen use sand crabs as bait. Soft-shelled Emerita are kept also as bait by commercial fisheries.

In some cultures, sand crabs are eaten as a popular snack, such as in Thailand. They are often prepared via shallow frying in a pan or deep frying in batter. The taste is often described as falling somewhere between that of shrimp and crab. Eating sand crabs presents a risk of paralytic shellfish poisoning and/or infection with Profilicollis parasites. In Malaysia, the sand crab locally known as yat yat, ibu remis, kutu laut or udang pasir can be found along the beaches in Kelantan during the monsoon season. The crab is a local delicacy that is usually fried with eggs or roasted on a skewer like satay.

== Life cycle ==
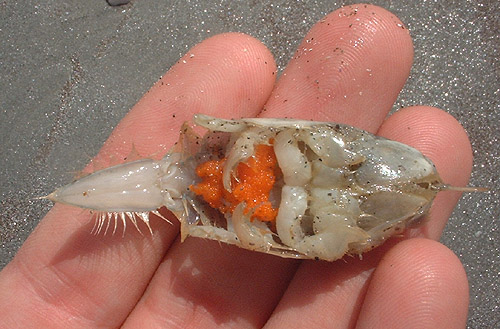
Eggs on the underside of a female E. analoga

Emerita has a short lifespan, perhaps no more than two to three years, and can reproduce in its first year of life. The eggs are bright orange, and hatch into larvae, which may live as plankton for more than four months and can be carried long distances by ocean currents. The number of zoeal stages varies between species from six to eleven. Somatic growth and sexual differentiation in Emerita are restricted to discrete events (molts) and both processes compete for energy reserve. In some conditions of high food availability, overlapping reproductive and molting processes would enable females to reach an optimum size and sexual maturity with fewer molts.
