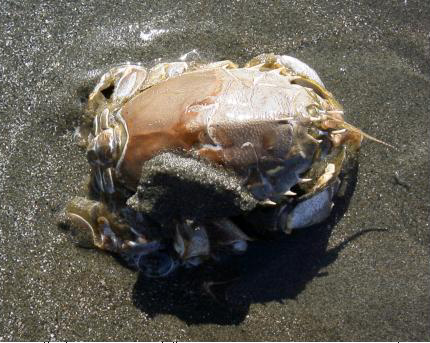
- Blepharipoda occidentalis

Scientific classification
- Domain: Eukaryota
- Kingdom: Animalia
- Phylum: Arthropoda
- Class: Malacostraca
- Order: Decapoda
- Suborder: Pleocyemata
- Infraorder: Anomura
- Family: Blepharipodidae
- Genus: Blepharipoda; Randall, 1840

= Blepharipoda =

Genus of crustaceans

Blepharipoda is a genus of mole crabs, containing the following species:

- Blepharipoda doelloi Schmitt, 1942
- Blepharipoda liberata Shen, 1949
- Blepharipoda occidentalis Randall, 1840
- Blepharipoda spinosa (H. Milne-Edwards & Lucas, 1841)

Blepharipoda liberata is harvested for food in China.
