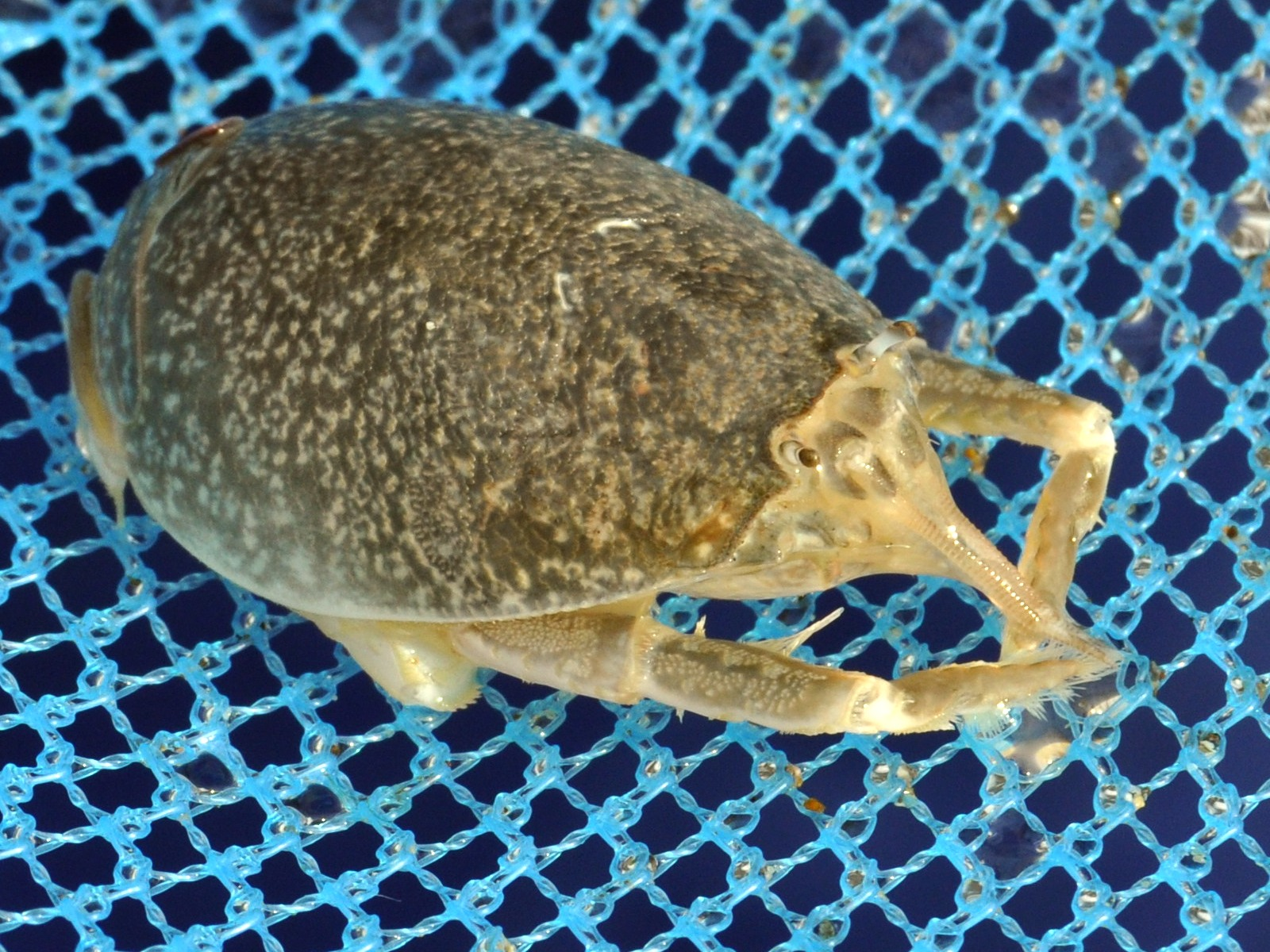
- Hippa adactyla

Scientific classification
- Kingdom: Animalia
- Phylum: Arthropoda
- Clade: Pancrustacea
- Class: Malacostraca
- Order: Decapoda
- Suborder: Pleocyemata
- Infraorder: Anomura
- Family: Hippidae
- Genus: Hippa; Fabricius, 1787

= Hippa =

Genus of decapod crustaceans

Hippa is a genus of decapod crustaceans in the family Hippidae, containing the following species:

- Hippa adactyla Fabricius, 1787
- Hippa admirabilis Thallwitz, 1892
- Hippa alcimede de Man, 1902
- Hippa australis Hale, 1927
- Hippa carcineutes Holthuis & Manning, 1970
- Hippa celaeno de Man, 1896
- Hippa granulatus Borradaile, 1904
- Hippa hirtipes Dana, 1852
- Hippa indica Haig, Murugan & Balakrishnan Nair, 1986
- Hippa marmorata Hombron & Jacquinot, 1846
- Hippa ovalis A. Milne-Edwards, 1862
- Hippa picta Heller, 1861
- Hippa strigillata Stimpson, 1860
- Hippa testudinaria Herbst, 1791
- Hippa truncatifrons Miers, 1878

It is closely related to the genus Emerita, and species have often been transferred between the two genera.
