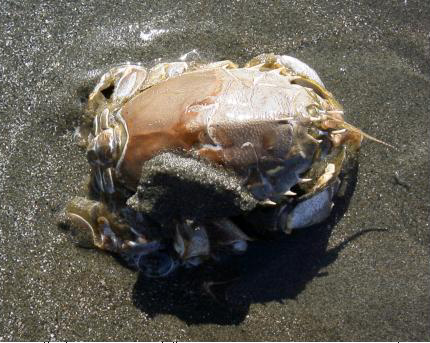
- Blepharipoda occidentalis

Scientific classification
- Kingdom: Animalia
- Phylum: Arthropoda
- Class: Malacostraca
- Order: Decapoda
- Suborder: Pleocyemata
- Infraorder: Anomura
- Superfamily: Hippoidea; Latreille, 1825

Families
- Albuneidae; Blepharipodidae; Hippidae

= Hippoidea =

Hippoidea Temporal range: Maastrichtian–Recent

Superfamily of crustaceans

Hippoidea is a superfamily of decapod crustaceans known as mole crabs or sand crabs.

== Ecology ==
Hippoids are adapted to burrowing into sandy beaches, a habit they share with raninid crabs, and the parallel evolution of the two groups is striking. In the family Hippidae, the body is almost ovoid, the first pereiopods have no claws, and the telson is long, none of which are seen in related groups. Unlike most other decapods, sand crabs cannot walk; instead, they use their legs to dig into the sand. Members of the family Hippidae beat their uropods to swim.

Apart from the polar regions, hippoids can be found on beaches throughout the world. Larvae of one species have also been found in Antarctic waters, despite the lack of suitable sandy beaches in the Antarctic.

== Classification ==
Alongside hermit crabs and allies (Paguroidea), squat lobsters and allies (Galatheoidea) and the hairy stone crab (Lomis hirta, Lomisoidea), Hippoidea is one of the four groups that make up the infraorder Anomura. Of the four, Hippoidea is thought to be the most basal, with the other three groups being more closely related to each other than to Hippoidea.

The fossil record of sand crabs is sparse, but extends back to the Cretaceous period. Sand crabs are placed in three families (exclusively fossil taxa are marked †):

Albuneidae Stimpson, 1858

- Albunea Weber, 1795
- Austrolepidopa Efford & Haig, 1968
- Harryhausenia Boyko, 2004 †
- Italialbunea Boyko, 2002 †
- Lepidopa Stimpson, 1858
- Leucolepidopa Efford, 1969
- Paralbunea Serène, 1977
- Paraleucolepidopa Calado, 1996
- Praealbunea Fraaije, 2002 †
- Squillalbunea Boyko, 2002
- Stemonopa Efford & Haig, 1968
- Zygopa Holthuis, 1961

Blepharipodidae Boyko, 2002

- Blepharipoda Randall, 1840
- Lophomastix Benedict, 1904

Hippidae Latreille, 1825

- Emerita Scopoli, 1777
- Hippa Fabricius, 1787
- Mastigochirus Miers, 1878
