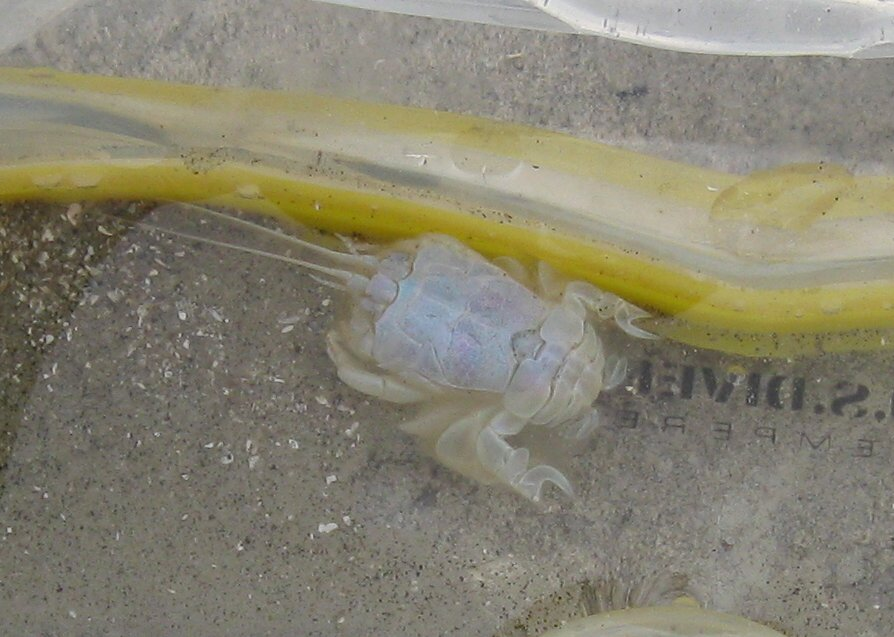

Scientific classification
- Kingdom: Animalia
- Phylum: Arthropoda
- Clade: Pancrustacea
- Class: Malacostraca
- Order: Decapoda
- Suborder: Pleocyemata
- Infraorder: Anomura
- Superfamily: Hippoidea
- Family: Albuneidae; Stimpson, 1858

Genera
- Albuneinae: Albunea; Paralbunea; Squillalbunea; Stemonopa; Zygopa; Lepidopinae: Austrolepidopa; Lepidopa; Leucolepidopa; Paraleucolepidopa

= Albuneidae =

Albuneidae Temporal range: Maastrichtian–Recent

Family of crustaceans

Albuneidae is a little-known family of specialized burrowing sand crabs. There are 50 extant species as well as nine fossil species that have been described. Fossil specimens have been described from the Cretaceous, Miocene and Oligocene.
