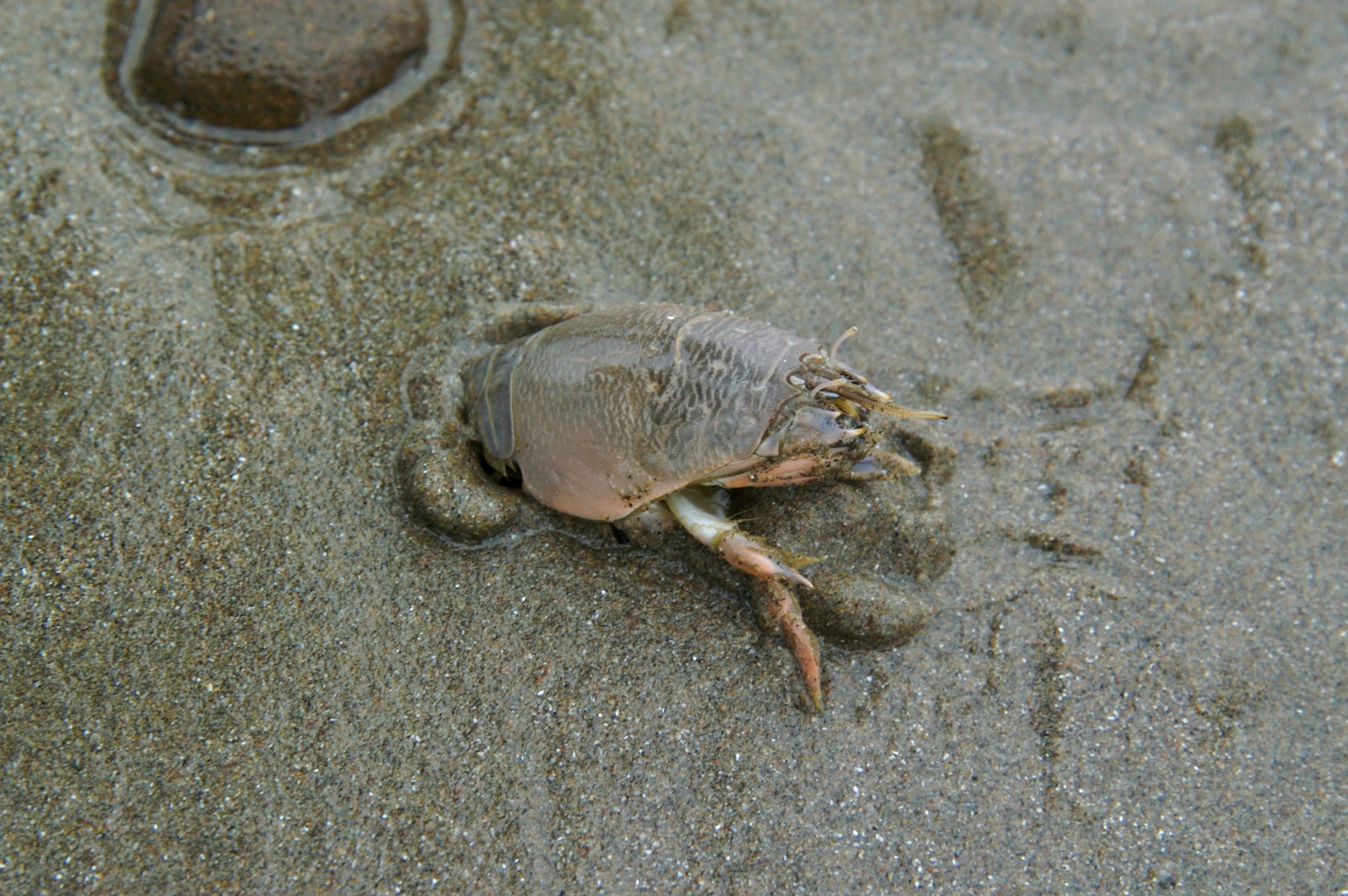
- Emerita analoga

Scientific classification
- Kingdom: Animalia
- Phylum: Arthropoda
- Clade: Pancrustacea
- Class: Malacostraca
- Order: Decapoda
- Suborder: Pleocyemata
- Infraorder: Anomura
- Superfamily: Hippoidea
- Family: Hippidae; Latreille, 1825

Genera
- Emerita Scopoli, 1777; Hippa Fabricius, 1787; Mastigochirus Miers, 1878

= Hippidae =

Family of crustaceans

Hippidae is a family of decapod crustaceans, currently known by the English name as either mole crab or sand crab, and by an earlier English name as sand bug. They are closely related to the family Albuneidae, with which they are usually joined in the superfamily Hippoidea. The family Hippidae comprises the three genera Emerita, Hippa and Mastigochirus. They burrow into sand, and are found throughout the world, except the Arctic and Antarctic.
