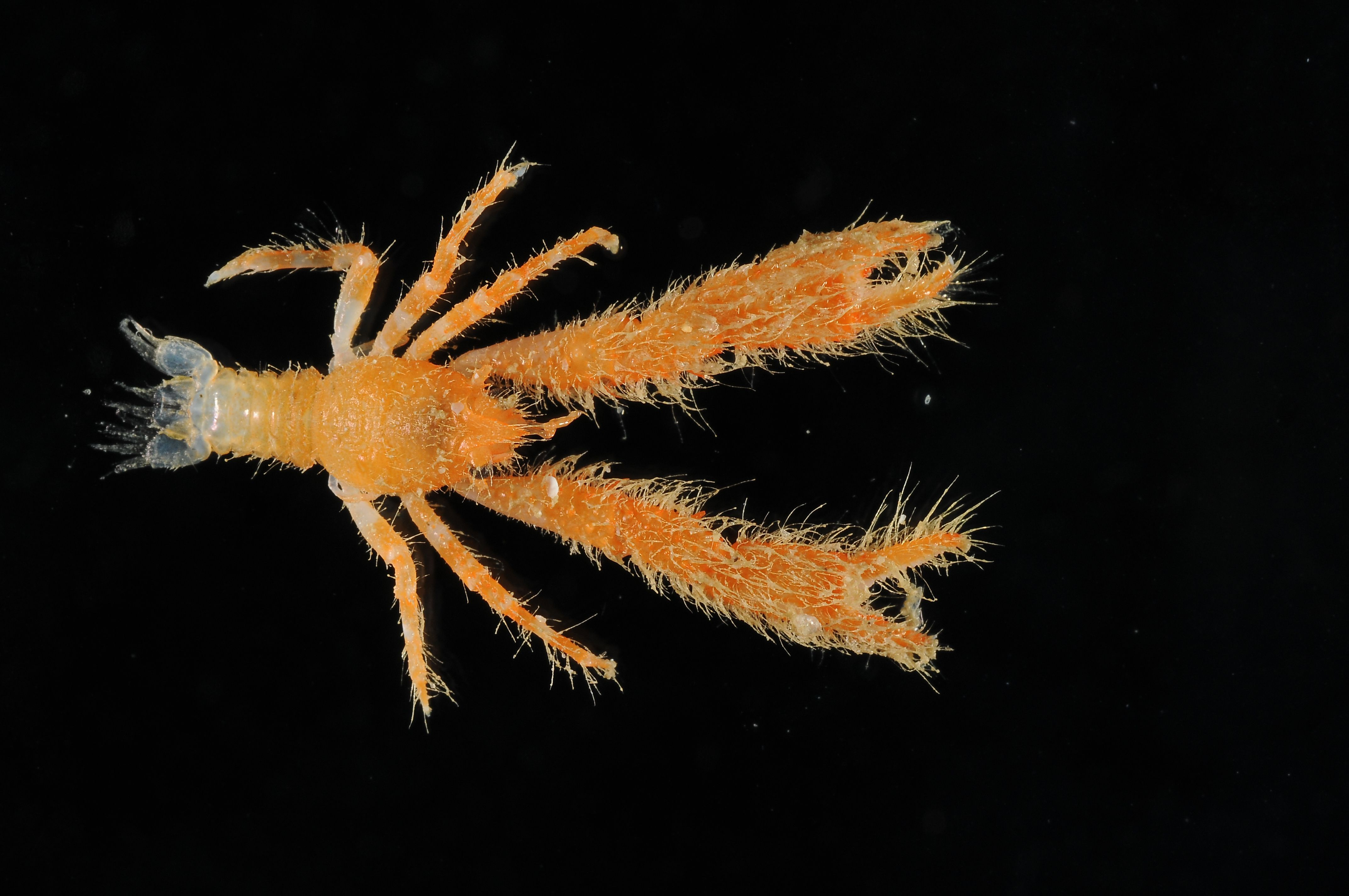
- Leiogalathea evander
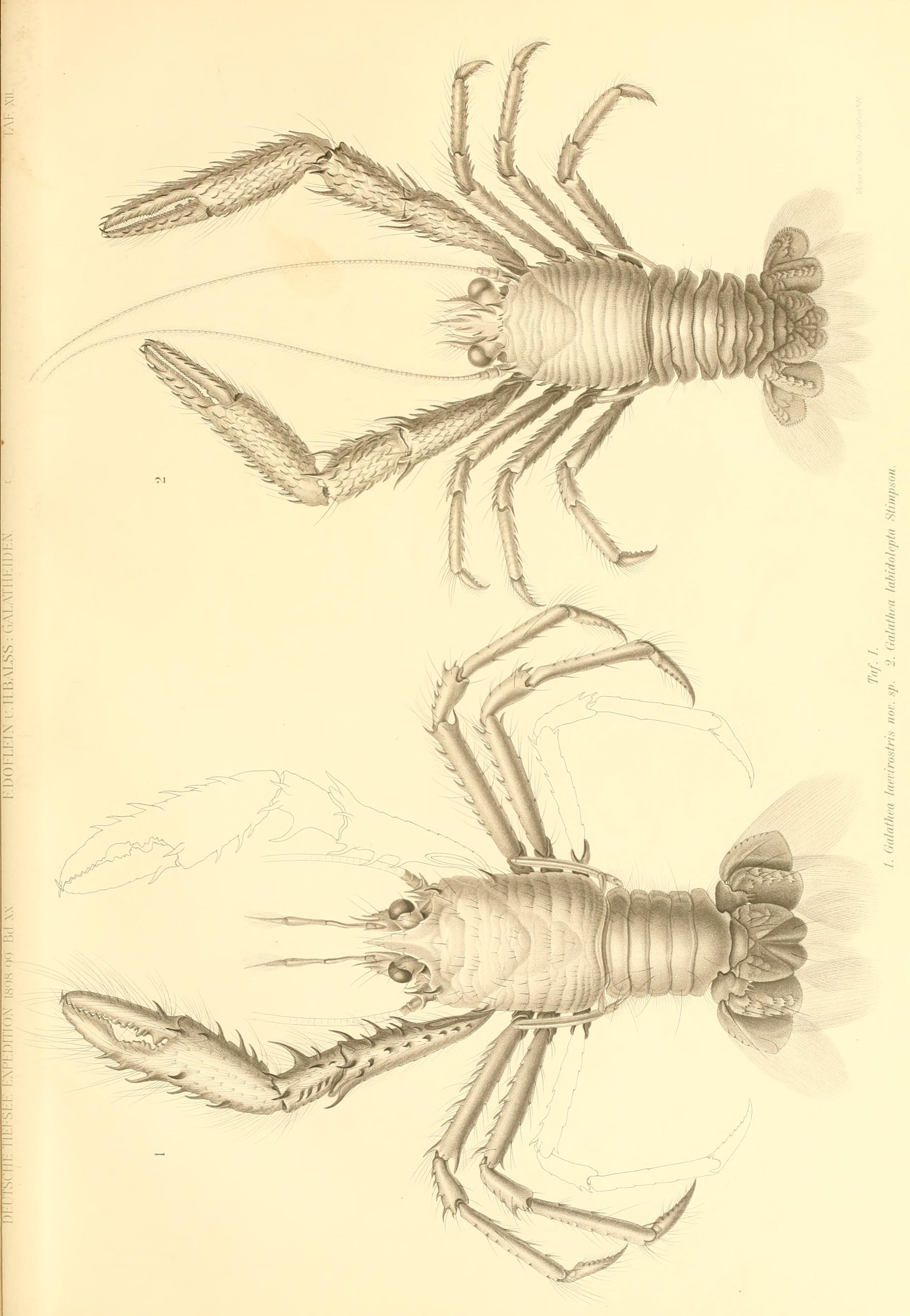
- Leiogalathea laevirostris

Scientific classification
- Kingdom: Animalia
- Phylum: Arthropoda
- Clade: Pancrustacea
- Class: Malacostraca
- Order: Decapoda
- Suborder: Pleocyemata
- Infraorder: Anomura
- Family: Munidopsidae
- Genus: Leiogalathea; Baba, 1969

= Leiogalathea =

Genus of crustaceans

Leiogalathea is a genus of squat lobsters belonging to the family Munidopsidae. This genus has a circum-tropical distribution, meaning that they can be found throughout the world's tropical regions. They inhabit deep sea environments.

== Taxonomy ==
This is a large genus that belongs to the taxonomic family Munidopsidae along with Shinkaia, Galacantha and Munidopsis. It seems that Leiogalathea is a sister genus to all the other munidopsid genera. The genus has four major lineages.

=== Evolution ===
Leiogalathea diverged from species in the Atlantic Ocean around 25 million years ago, likely in the Tethys Ocean during the Oligocene epoch. The closure of the Tethys seaway caused the Atlantic lineage to split from the Indo-Pacific lineage. Then it saw a period of rapid evolution until around 15 million years ago. Over the last five million years, there have been low rates of speciation. This general evolutionary history of Leiogalathea is true for all four major lineages within this genus.

== Species ==
The genus contains many species. Currently, the center of diversity seems to be in the tropical regions of the Southwestern Pacific, with the Atlantic being less diverse. It contains the following species:

- Leiogalathea achates (Rodríguez-Flores, Macpherson & Machordom, 2019)
- Leiogalathea aeneas (Rodríguez-Flores, Macpherson & Machordom, 2019)
- Leiogalathea agassizii (A. Milne Edwards, 1880)
- Leiogalathea amata (Rodríguez-Flores, Macpherson & Machordom, 2019)
- Leiogalathea anchises (Rodríguez-Flores, Macpherson & Machordom, 2019)
- Leiogalathea ascanius (Rodríguez-Flores, Macpherson & Machordom, 2019)
- Leiogalathea camilla (Rodríguez-Flores, Macpherson & Machordom, 2019)
- Leiogalathea creusa (Rodríguez-Flores, Macpherson & Machordom, 2019)
- Leiogalathea dido (Rodríguez-Flores, Macpherson & Machordom, 2019)
- Leiogalathea evander (Rodríguez-Flores, Macpherson & Machordom, 2019)
- Leiogalathea imperialis (Miyake & Baba, 1967)
- Leiogalathea juturna (Rodríguez-Flores, Macpherson & Machordom, 2019)
- Leiogalathea laevirostris (Balss, 1913)
- Leiogalathea pallas (Rodríguez-Flores, Macpherson & Machordom, 2019)
- Leiogalathea paris (Rodríguez-Flores, Macpherson & Machordom, 2019)
- Leiogalathea priam (Rodríguez-Flores, Macpherson & Machordom, 2019)
- Leiogalathea sinon (Rodríguez-Flores, Macpherson & Machordom, 2019)
- Leiogalathea turnus (Rodríguez-Flores, Macpherson & Machordom, 2019)
- Leiogalathea samudragiri (Tiwari, Padate & Cubelio, 2026)
