= Munidopsis taiwanica =

Scientific classification
- Kingdom: Animalia
- Phylum: Arthropoda
- Class: Malacostraca
- Order: Decapoda
- Suborder: Pleocyemata
- Infraorder: Anomura
- Family: Munidopsidae
- Genus: Munidopsis
- Species: M. taiwanica

Binomial name
- Munidopsis taiwanica (Osawa, Lin & Chan, 2008)

Species of crustacean

Munidopsis taiwanica, is a species of Munidopsis, a genus of squat lobster. Named after the type locality. Deepest known record for squat lobsters at 5491m in the Mariana Trench, and is the first confirmed species of squat lobster found in the mud volcano environment.

== Anatomy and morphology ==
When the specimen of Munidopsis taiwanica is fresh, it has an entirely white body and pereopods colouration. Munidopsis taiwanica has carapace 1.1 times as longer as its width, and covered with short curved plumose setae. Its dorsal surface is convex from side to side, strongly inflated on gastric and cardiac regions, with branchial that has small tubercles and lateral spines on the anterior and cardiac region with numerous, little elevated ridges on the posterior. It contains anterolateral spine that are slightly larger than antennal spine and slightly smaller than following spine on the lateral margins, with 6 or 7 posteriorly diminishing spines, and posterior branchial margin with 4 or 5 spines on the anterior half. Its telson divides into 8 plates, with 2 eye-spines and ocular peduncle that are hardly movable. Through observation it is suggested that Munidopsis taiwanica probably exhibited camouflage behaviour by attaching seafloor sediments onto its body forming a muddy layer of the background colour as it was closely associated with the chemosynthetic environment of a mud volcano field.

Munidopsis taiwanica appears most similar to Munidopsis solidissima, which are found in Madagascar, and are similar in morphology and colouration with Munidopsis profunda.

=== Intraspecific variations ===
The specimen that was collected in the Mariana Trench has 10 spines on the branchial, with rostrum that is more strongly upturned, and ventrolateral spine that is comparatively longer than the dorsolateral spines on the anterior. Whereas the sole type specimen has 11 or 12 spines, and the holotype has a rostrum that is less curved, and 2 subequal spines on the anterior. These differences could be interpreted as intraspecific variations unless more specimens are collected and could discover a systematic importance.

== Distribution and habitat ==
Munidopsis taiwanica is only known from Taiwan at present, at a depth of 4,990-5,011m. It is found in East of Taiwan Island, Mariana Trench, mud volcano environments. Munidopsis taiwanica is the 32nd species of the genus Munisopsis collected in Taiwan, and the 10th species from abyssal depths below 3,000m in the Taiwanese waters. The deepest known records is at 5491m in a marine mud volcano field in the Mariana Trench (10°51′02.5″N 41°57′11.2″E).

== Diet ==
Munidopsis taiwanica is a detritus feeder considering that its chelae has spoon-shaped fingers. Its food resource most likely consists of chemosynthetic bacteria and meiobenthos from the seafloor sediments. They might also prey on small heterotrophs, so they may feed on material produced by chemosynthetic bacteria. Some squat lobsters from vent and seep habitats, such as Shinkaia crosnieri and species of the family Kiwaidae, feed directly on the chemosynthetic bacteria.
