= Munidopsis tafrii =

Scientific classification
- Domain: Eukaryota
- Kingdom: Animalia
- Phylum: Arthropoda
- Class: Malacostraca
- Order: Decapoda
- Suborder: Pleocyemata
- Infraorder: Anomura
- Family: Munidopsidae
- Genus: Munidopsis
- Species: M. tafrii

Binomial name
- Munidopsis tafrii Osawa, Lin & Chan, 2006

Species of crustacean

Munidopsis tafrii is a species of squat lobster first found in Taiwanese waters at depths greater than 3,000 metres (9,800 ft). It resembles M. ceratophthalma, however its carapace morphology distinguishes it from its cogenerate species.
