= Munidopsis tuberosa =

Scientific classification
- Domain: Eukaryota
- Kingdom: Animalia
- Phylum: Arthropoda
- Class: Malacostraca
- Order: Decapoda
- Suborder: Pleocyemata
- Infraorder: Anomura
- Family: Munidopsidae
- Genus: Munidopsis
- Species: M. tuberosa

Binomial name
- Munidopsis tuberosa Osawa, Lin & Chan, 2008

Species of crustacean

Munidopsis tuberosa is a species of squat lobster, first isolated from deep waters off Taiwan. M. tuberosa is similar to M. granosicorium, but it differs by the configuration of its carapace and rostrum.
