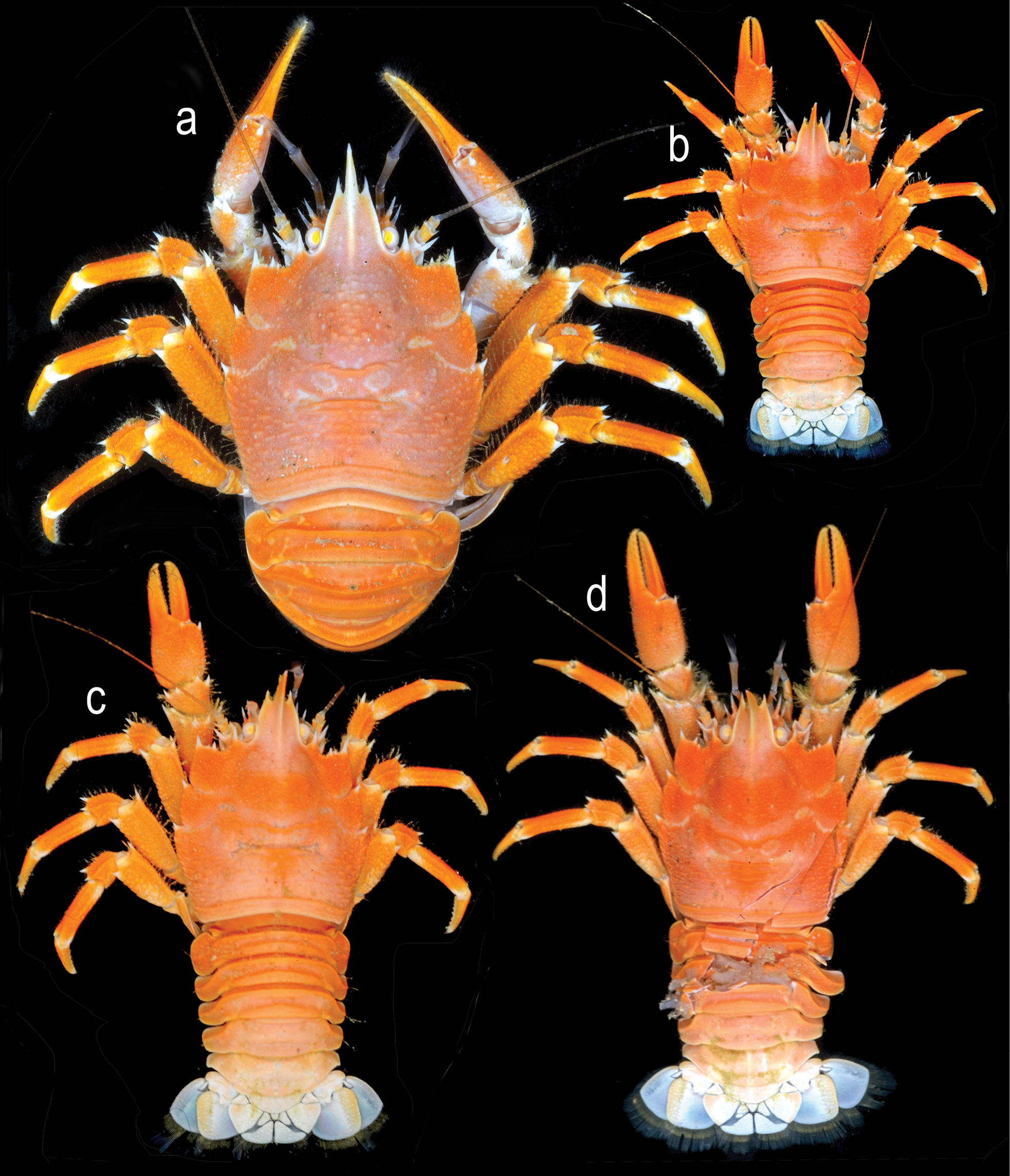

Scientific classification
- Kingdom: Animalia
- Phylum: Arthropoda
- Class: Malacostraca
- Order: Decapoda
- Suborder: Pleocyemata
- Infraorder: Anomura
- Family: Munidopsidae
- Genus: Munidopsis
- Species: M. messingi

Binomial name
- Munidopsis messingi Rodríguez-Flores, Bracken-Grissom, Lemaitre, Felder & Nizinski, 2025

= Munidopsis messingi =

Species of crustacean

Munidopsis messingi is a species of squat lobster in the family Munidopsidae. It is known from Curaçao and the east coast of Florida, at depths between 173 and 264 meters. Its biology is unknown.

== Etymology ==
Munidopsis messingi was named after the taxonomist and marine biologist Charles Messing, to honor his passion for ocean exploration and in recognition of his contributions to the biology, natural history, and taxonomy of marine invertebrates.

== Description ==
The carapace of Munidopsis messingi is hairy dorsally, with the frontmost areas smooth and the rear areas with tiny scales and granules. The rostrum is broad, upturned, and with a mid-ridge. The tip splits into three points, with the middle point being the longest. The eye region has a sharp orbital spine over the antenna, one to three small spines near the front corner, a strong anterolateral spine, and two branchial spines per side. The abdomen segments have no spines, and the telson is composed of 10 plates. The sternum is wide. Sternite 3 possesses a central lobe and two smaller side lobes, and sternite 4 is broad and triangular in front. The antennules each possess two outer spines on the first segment, and the first segments of the antennas have strong inner and outer distal spines. The 2nd and 3rd segments of the antenna also bear spines, but the 4th segment is unarmed. The third maxilliped (Mxp3) merus has three strong inner spines, a small spine on the tip, and an outer edge with four spines. The chelipeds are stout, with the cheliped merus and carpus bearing distal spines. The hand and fingers are smooth, with the finger tips spoon-like in shape. The upper edge of the movable finger is keeled. The walking legs are stout, with the merus possessing a dorsal ridge. Each carpus has a distal spine. The propodus is long and unarmed, and the dactyls are slender, slightly curved, and with 6-8 small teeth on the inner edge. Epipods are present on the chelipeds and first pair of walking legs.

The carapace, walking legs and chelipeds are entirely light to reddish orange, and the distal parts of the rostrum, limb articles, and spines are whitish.
