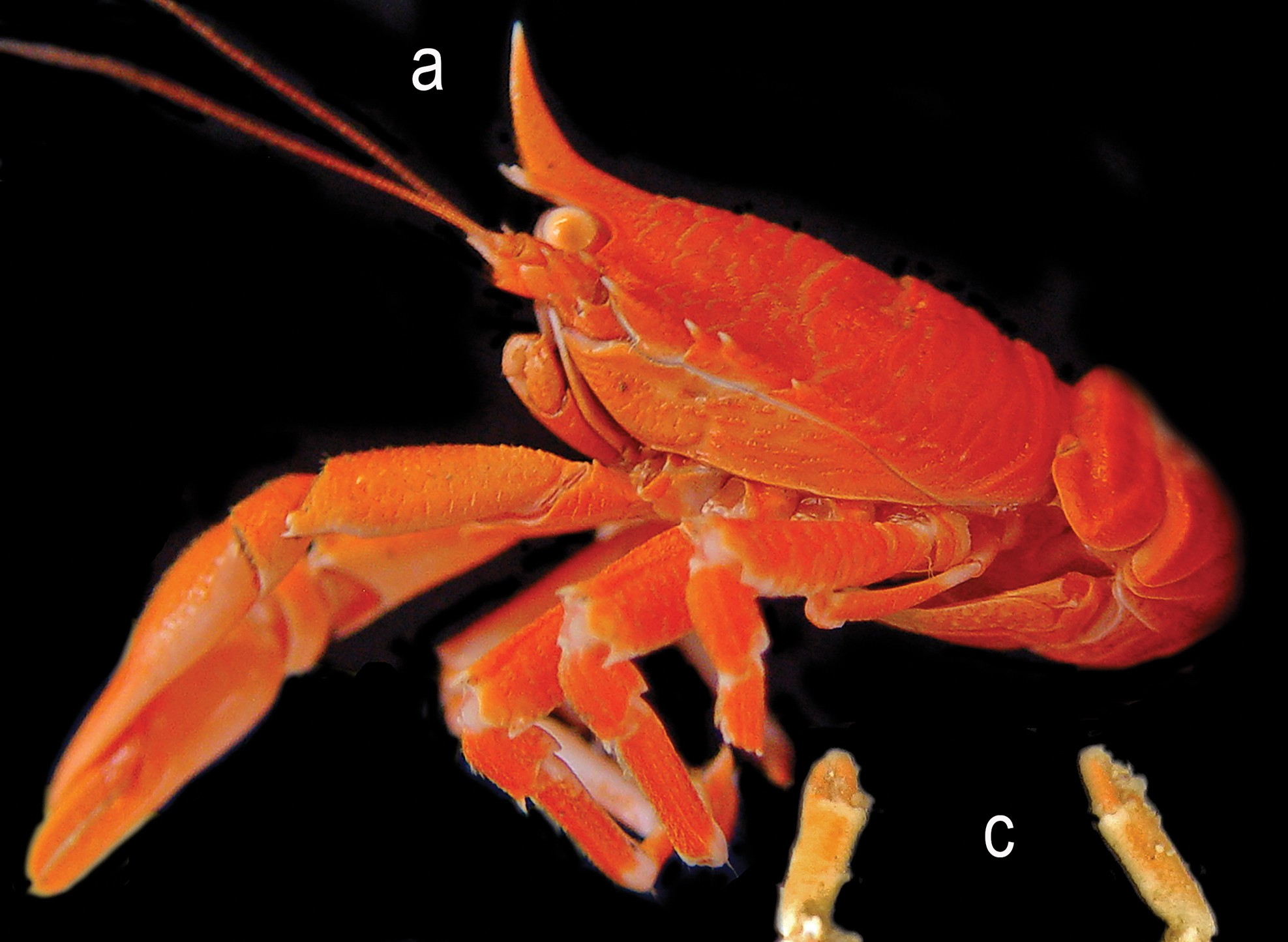

Scientific classification
- Kingdom: Animalia
- Phylum: Arthropoda
- Clade: Pancrustacea
- Class: Malacostraca
- Order: Decapoda
- Suborder: Pleocyemata
- Infraorder: Anomura
- Family: Munidopsidae
- Genus: Munidopsis
- Species: M. expansa

Binomial name
- Munidopsis expansa Benedict, 1902

= Munidopsis expansa =

Species of crustacean

Munidopsis expansa is a species of squat lobster in the family Munidopsidae. It is known from the north coast of Cuba, Belize, the Atlantic coast of Florida, and the interior Gulf of Mexico at a depth of 457-1107 meters. Individuals have been observed walking on dead coral rubble in a habitat characterized by large, mostly dead colonies of the deep-sea coral Desmophyllum pertusum.

== Discovery ==
The holotype specimen of Munidopsis expansa was collected by the research vessel USS Albatross on May 4, 1886, off the east coast of Florida. This individual was later used by James Everard Benedict to describe the species in 1902.

== Description ==
The carapace of Munidopsis expansa is dorsally covered with scales, which are shorter and more abundant on the gastric region and broader posteriorly. The rostrum is moderately broad, dorsally elevated, and frontally trifid. The eye orbit is slightly excavated, and the outer orbital angle has a small, blunt lobe. Article 1 of the antennule possesses dorsolateral and distolateral spines. Article 1 of the antenna has strong distolateral spines and a strong distomesial spine. The anterolateral angle has a broad spine, and the branchial margin possesses three broad spines. The abdominal tergites are spineless. The telson is split into eight plates. The merus of maxilliped 3 is serrated but does not show spines, except the extensor margin which displays a small spine. The first pereopod (P1) is stout and shorter than twice the PCL. The meri carry distal spines, while the carpi, palm, and fingers are unarmed. The fixed finger lacks a denticulate carina on the distolateral margin, and the dactylus is dorsally carinate. Pereopods 2–4 are stout; their meri are carinate along the dorsal margin, and their dactyli are slender, curve distally, and have 11–12 teeth on the flexor margin that decrease in size proximally along the entire length. Epipods are present on P1 and P2.
