= Munidopsis andamanica =

Scientific classification
- Kingdom: Animalia
- Phylum: Arthropoda
- Clade: Pancrustacea
- Class: Malacostraca
- Order: Decapoda
- Suborder: Pleocyemata
- Infraorder: Anomura
- Family: Munidopsidae
- Genus: Munidopsis
- Species: M. andamanica

Binomial name
- Munidopsis andamanica MacGilchrist, 1905

Species of crustacean

Munidopsis andamanica is a species of squat lobster that lives in the deep sea and eats dead wood. It has long chelipeds (claw-bearing legs), which are twice as long as the carapace.
