= Munidopsis echinata =

Scientific classification
- Domain: Eukaryota
- Kingdom: Animalia
- Phylum: Arthropoda
- Class: Malacostraca
- Order: Decapoda
- Suborder: Pleocyemata
- Infraorder: Anomura
- Family: Munidopsidae
- Genus: Munidopsis
- Species: M. echinata

Binomial name
- Munidopsis echinata Osawa, Lin & Chan, 2008

Species of crustacean

Munidopsis echinata is a species of squat lobster, first found in deep waters off Taiwan. M. echinata is similar to M. colombiana, but differs by lacking an antennal spine on its carapace and having a rather longer antennal peduncle.
