= Munidopsis mandelai =

Scientific classification
- Kingdom: Animalia
- Phylum: Arthropoda
- Class: Malacostraca
- Order: Decapoda
- Suborder: Pleocyemata
- Infraorder: Anomura
- Family: Munidopsidae
- Genus: Munidopsis
- Species: M. mandelai

Binomial name
- Munidopsis mandelai Macpherson, Amon & Clark, 2014

Species of crustacean

Munidopsis mandelai is a species of Munidopsidae that lives on the Southwest Indian Ocean Ridge around 750 meters below sea level. With a carapace that grows to 7 mm long, it is the second largest species in the genus Munidopsis.

== Etymology ==
Munidopsis mandelai was named after Nelson Mandela, who died the month before its discovery.
