= Platykotta =

Platykotta Temporal range: Norian–Rhaetian

Scientific classification
- Kingdom: Animalia
- Phylum: Arthropoda
- Clade: Pancrustacea
- Class: Malacostraca
- Order: Decapoda
- Suborder: Pleocyemata
- Infraorder: Anomura
- Family: †Platykottidae; Chablais et al., 2011
- Genus: †Platykotta; Chablais et al., 2011
- Species: †P. akaina

Binomial name
- †Platykotta akaina Chablais et al., 2011

Extinct genus of crustaceans

Platykotta akaina is a species of decapod crustacean from the Triassic of the United Arab Emirates. It is the oldest known fossil from the infraorder Anomura, and is most closely related to Eocarcinus praecursor.

== Stratigraphy ==
The holotype of P. akaina was found in the United Arab Emirates on the Musandam Peninsula – the peninsula which separates the Persian Gulf from the Gulf of Oman. From the Permian to the Cretaceous, the area was near the shore of the Tethys Sea, which produced carbonate sedimentary rocks. The strata that contained Platykotta were part of the Ghalilah Formation, of Norian–Rhaetian age. These rocks contain extensive networks of burrows, and various other fossils, including bivalves of the families Megalodontidae and Wallowaconchidae, brachiopods, crinoids, sponges and corals. The holotype was found at approximately 25°44′N 56°5′E and has been deposited in the Natural History Museum of Geneva, Switzerland.

== Description ==
Platykotta is characterised by a broad, triangular sternum, unlike the very narrow sternum seen in Astacidea (true lobsters and freshwater crayfish) and Glypheoidea. A similar sternal form is seen in the spiny lobsters and slipper lobsters, and also several families of Anomura, including Galatheidae and Chirostylidae (squat lobsters), and Aeglidae. Unlike other anomurans, however, the carapace is considerably longer than wide. The pattern of grooves on the carapace indicates clear affinities with the Anomura.

== Systematics ==
Platykotta is placed in its own family, Platykottidae, which sits alongside Eocarcinidae (containing only Eocarcinus) in the superfamily Eocarcinoidea. Eocarcinus was previously treated as the earliest true crab, but is now thought, like Platykotta, to show too little carcinisation to be a true crab, and is placed instead among the Anomura.
