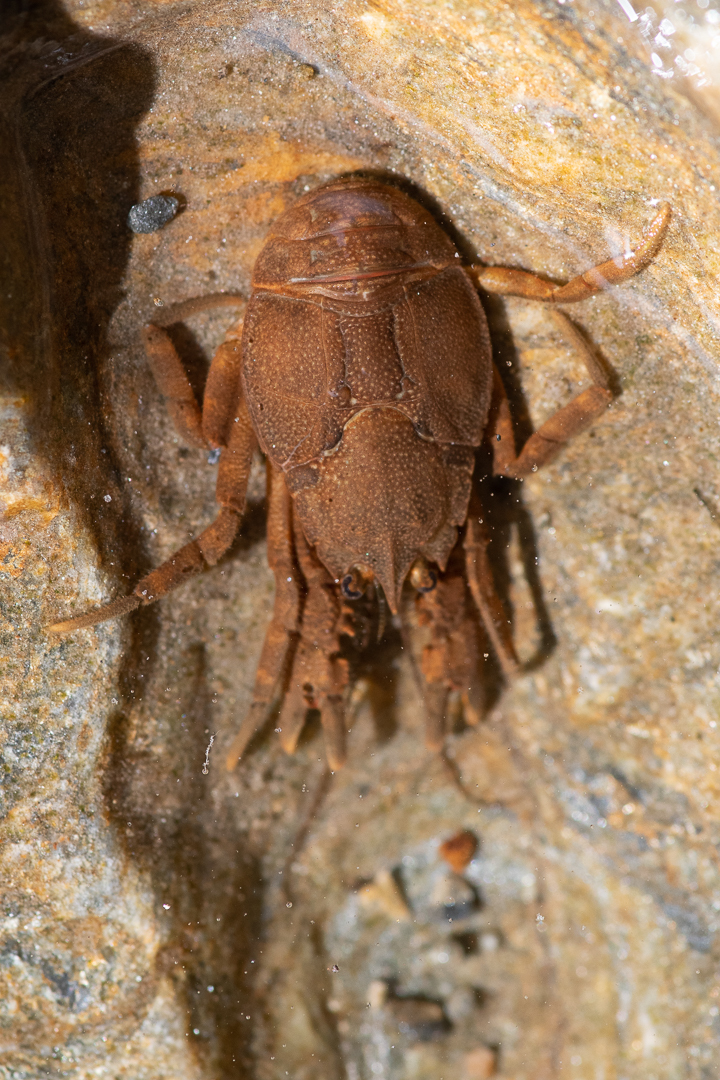

Scientific classification
- Domain: Eukaryota
- Kingdom: Animalia
- Phylum: Arthropoda
- Class: Malacostraca
- Order: Decapoda
- Suborder: Pleocyemata
- Infraorder: Anomura
- Family: Aeglidae
- Genus: Aegla
- Species: A. alacalufi

Binomial name
- Aegla alacalufi Jara & López, 1981

= Aegla alacalufi =

Species of freshwater crustacean

Aegla alacalufi is a species of freshwater crustacean found in the streams and lakes of Chile's southwestern coast. It is found both on islands and on the mainland, and its population is small, sparse, and isolated.
