= Austin B. Williams =

Austin Beatty Williams (October 17, 1919 – October 27, 1999) was an American carcinologist, "the acknowledged expert on and leader in studies of the systematics of eastern American decapod crustaceans".

== Biography ==
Austin B. Williams was born on October 17, 1919, in Plattsburg, Missouri, the eldest of three children to Oliver Perry Williams and Lucy Sell. He was educated at McPherson College and the University of Kansas, gaining his Ph.D. in 1951. He then worked at the University of North Carolina Institute of Fisheries Research, the University of Illinois, before gaining a position in the systematics laboratory of the National Marine Fisheries Service, based at the Smithsonian Institution. He was married and had one son and two grandchildren. He died of cancer at Falls Church, Virginia, on October 27, 1999.

== Work ==
Williams' first scientific paper, published in 1952, described six new species of freshwater crayfish from the Ozark Mountains of Arkansas, Missouri and Oklahoma; he continued to publish until his death in 1999, accruing 118 publications in that time. His most important works include monographs on the marine decapod crustaceans of the Carolinas, on the decapods of the Atlantic coast of the United States, and on the lobsters of the world's oceans. He won several awards, including the Crustacean Society's Excellence in Research Award and the American Fisheries Society's Oscar Elton Sette Award.

=== Taxa ===
Austin B. Williams described or co-described 101 new taxa of decapod crustaceans, from the rank of subspecies to superfamily (obelisks mark fossil taxa):

Caridea

- Alvinocaris Williams & Chace, 1982
- Alvinocaris lusca Williams & Chace, 1982
- Alvinocaris markensis Williams, 1988
- Alvinocaris muricola Williams, 1988
- Alvinocaris stactophila Williams, 1988
- Leptalpheus Williams, 1965
- Leptalpheus forceps Williams, 1965
- Ogyrides hayi Williams, 1981
- Ogyrides limicola Williams, 1955
- Opaepele Williams & Dobbs, 1995
- Opaepele loihi Williams & Dobbs, 1995
- Rimicaris Williams & Rona, 1986
- Rimicaris chacei Williams & Rona, 1986
- Rimicaris exoculata Williams & Rona, 1986

Astacidea

- Homarinus Kornfield, Williams & Steneck, 1995
- Orconectes eupunctus Williams, 1952
- Orconectes meeki brevis Williams, 1952
- Orconectes nana Williams, 1952
- Orconectes nana marcus Williams, 1952
- Orconectes neglectus chaenodactylus Williams, 1952
- Orconectes ozarkae Williams, 1952

Axiidea

- †Axiopsis eximia Kensley & Williams, 1990
- Calocaris jenneri Williams, 1974
- Calocaris oxypleura Williams, 1974

Gebiidea

- Aethogebia Williams, 1993
- Aethogebia gorei Williams, 1993
- Pomatogebia Williams & Ngoc-Ho, 1990
- Upogebia acanthops Williams, 1986
- Upogebia aestuari Williams, 1993
- Upogebia aquilina Williams, 1993
- Upogebia baldwini Williams, 1997
- Upogebia bermudensis Williams, 1993
- Upogebia burkenroadi Williams, 1986
- Upogebia careospina Williams, 1993
- Upogebia casis Williams, 1993
- Upogebia cocosia Williams, 1986
- Upogebia coralliflora Williams & Scott, 1989
- Upogebia cortesi Williams, 2000
- Upogebia dawsoni Williams, 1986
- Upogebia felderi Williams, 1993
- Upogebia galapagensis Williams, 1986
- Upogebia inomissa Williams, 1993
- Upogebia jonesi Williams, 1986
- Upogebia lepta Williams, 1986
- Upogebia maccraryae Williams, 1986
- Upogebia macginitieorum Williams, 1986
- Upogebia molipollex Williams, 1993
- Upogebia omissago Williams, 1993
- Upogebia onychion Williams, 1986
- Upogebia paraffinis Williams, 1993
- Upogebia pillsbury Williams, 1993
- Upogebia ramphula Williams, 1986
- Upogebia schmitti Williams, 1986
- Upogebia spinistipula Williams & Heard, 1991
- Upogebia synagelas Williams, 1987
- Upogebia tenuipollex Williams, 1986
- Upogebia thistlei Williams, 1986
- Upogebia toralae Williams & Hernández-Aguilera, 1998
- Upogebia vargasae Williams, 1997
- Upogebia veleronis Williams, 1986

Anomura

- Munidopsis alvisca Williams, 1998
- Munidopsis glabra Pequegnat & Williams, 1995
- Munidopsis granosicorium Williams & Baba, 1990
- Munidopsis lentigo Williams & Van Dover, 1983
- Munidopsis lignaria Williams & Baba, 1990
- Munidopsis marianica Williams & Baba, 1990
- Shinkaia Baba & Williams, 1998
- Shinkaia crosnieri Baba & Williams, 1998
- Uroptychus edisoniscus Baba & Williams, 1998

Brachyura

- Allactaea Williams, 1974
- Allactaea lithorostrata Williams, 1974
- Bothromaia Williams & Moffit, 1991
- Bothromaia griffini Williams & Moffit, 1991
- Bythograeoidea Williams, 1980
- Bythograeidae Williams, 1980
- Bythograea Williams, 1980
- Bythograea mesatlantica Williams, 1988
- Bythograea thermydon Williams, 1980
- Callinectes similis Williams, 1966
- Cyclozodion Williams & Child, 1989
- Cyclozodion tuberatum Williams & Child, 1989
- Epilobocera wetherbeei Rondríguez & Williams, 1995
- Eplumula Williams, 1982
- †Heus Bishop & Williams, 2000
- †Heus forsteri Bishop & Williams, 2000
- Hypsophrys noar Williams, 1974
- Latreillia manningi Williams, 1982
- Latreillia metanesa Williams, 1982
- Menippe adina Williams & Felder, 1986
- Mimilambridae Williams, 1979
- Mimilambrus Williams, 1979
- Mimilambrus wileyi Williams, 1979
- †Necrocarcinus olsonorum Bishop & Williams, 1991
- Ovalipes stephensoni Williams, 1976
- Panopeus austrobesus Williams, 1984
- Panopeus margentus Williams & Boschi, 1990
- Panopeus meridionalis Williams, 1984
- Plagiophthalmus bjorki Bishop & Williams, 2000
- Raninella manningi Bishop & Williams, 2000
- Rochinia decipiata Williams & Eldgredge, 1994
- Stilbomastax Williams, Shaw & Hopkins, 1977

One genus and several species were named by other scientists in honor of Williams. They include:

- Plesionika williamsi Forest, 1974 – a species of deep-water shrimp
- Agostocaris williamsi Hart & Manning, 1986 – a species of shrimp from the Caribbean Sea
- Austinograea williamsi Hessler & Martin, 1989 – a crab from hydrothermal vents; both the genus and the specific epithet commemorate Williams
