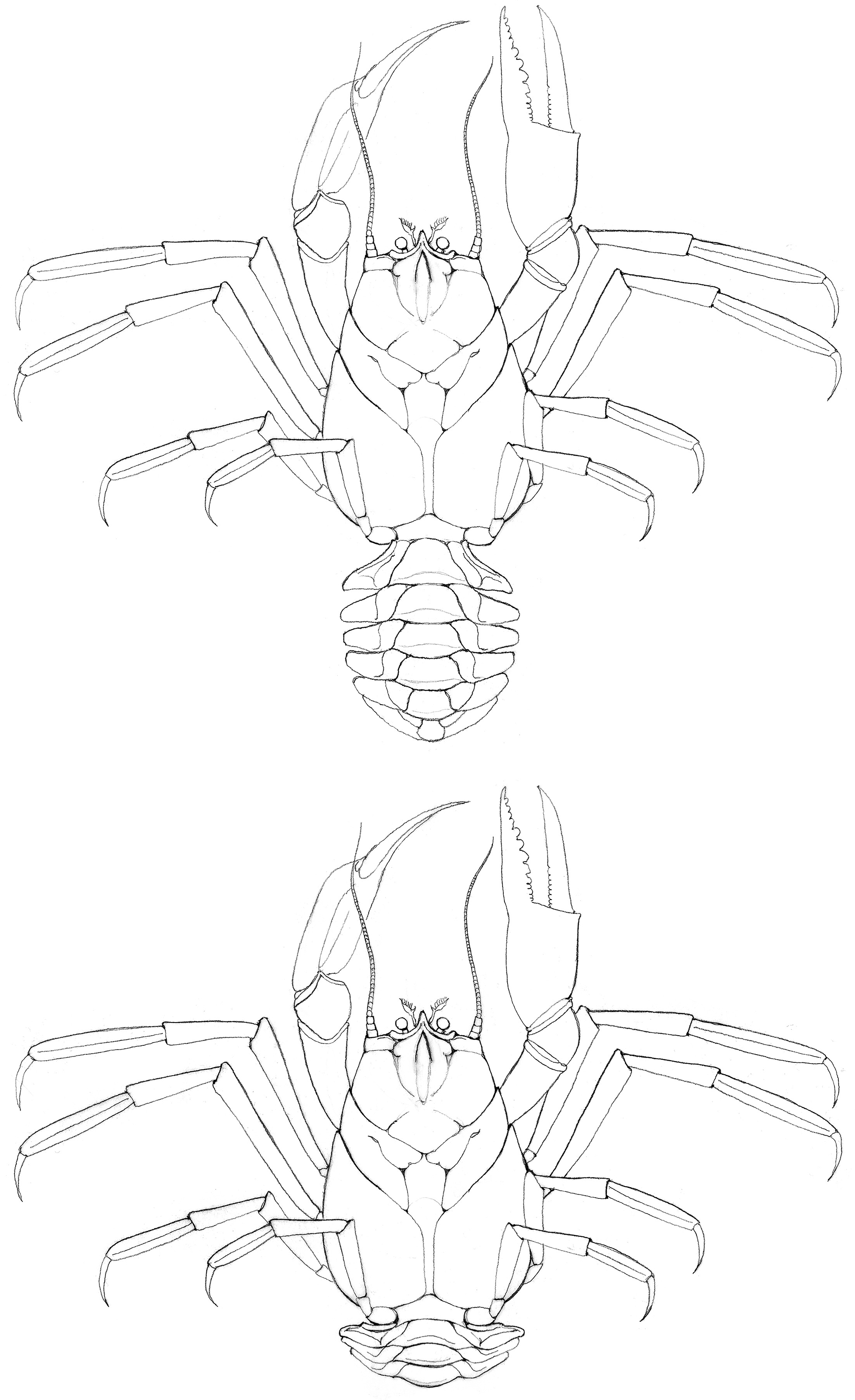
- Reconstruction sketch

Scientific classification
- Kingdom: Animalia
- Phylum: Arthropoda
- Class: Malacostraca
- Order: Decapoda
- Suborder: Pleocyemata
- Infraorder: Anomura
- Superfamily: †Eocarcinoidea; Withers, 1932

Genera
- Eocarcinus; Platykotta

= Eocarcinoidea =

Eocarcinoidea Temporal range: Norian–Pliensbachian

Extinct group of crustaceans

Eocarcinoidea is a superfamily of fossil decapod crustaceans. Formerly thought to be the earliest true crabs, they are now thought to be the oldest members of the Anomura. Two species are included, each in its own family-taxon: Eocarcinus praecursor (Eocarcinidae) and Platykotta akaina (Platykottidae).
