= Allactaea =

Scientific classification
- Kingdom: Animalia
- Phylum: Arthropoda
- Clade: Pancrustacea
- Class: Malacostraca
- Order: Decapoda
- Suborder: Pleocyemata
- Infraorder: Brachyura
- Family: Xanthidae
- Genus: Allactaea; Williams, 1974
- Species: A. lithostrota

Binomial name
- Allactaea lithostrota Williams, 1974

Genus of crabs

Allactaea lithostrota is a species of crab in the family Xanthidae, the only species in the genus Allactaea.
