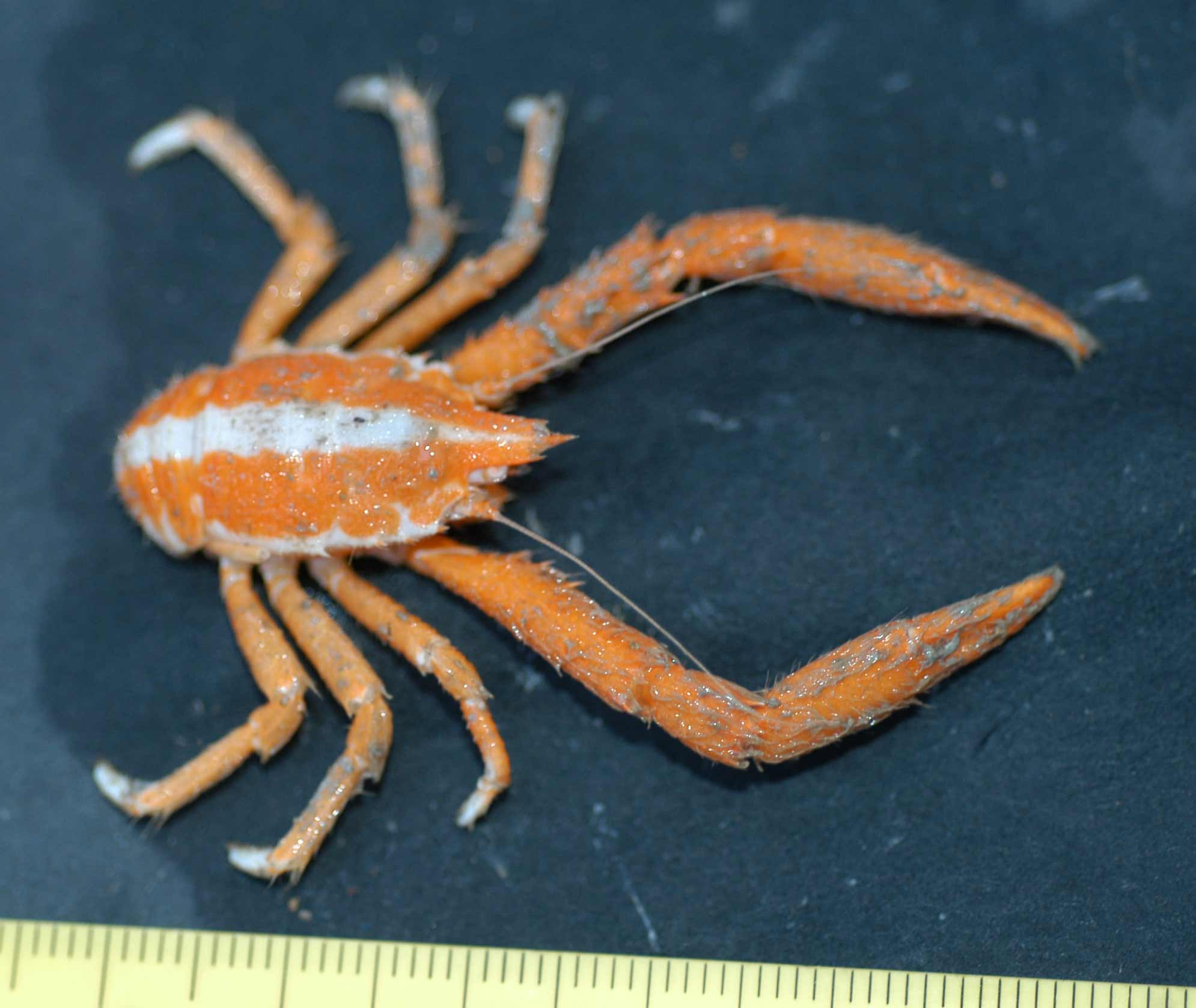

Scientific classification
- Kingdom: Animalia
- Phylum: Arthropoda
- Clade: Pancrustacea
- Class: Malacostraca
- Order: Decapoda
- Suborder: Pleocyemata
- Infraorder: Anomura
- Family: Munidopsidae
- Genus: Munidopsis
- Species: M. serricornis

Binomial name
- Munidopsis serricornis (Lovén, 1852)

Synonyms
- Galathea serricornis Lovén, 1852; Galathea tridentata Esmark, 1857; Galathodes serricornis (Lovén, 1852); Galathodes rosaceus A. Milne-Edwards, 1881; Galathodes tridentata (Esmark, 1857); Galathodes tridentatus (Esmark, 1857); Munidopsis rosacea (A. Milne-Edwards, 1881); Munidopsis bahamensis Benedict, 1902; Munidopsis tridentata (Esmark, 1857); Munidopsis tridentatus (Esmark, 1857); Munidopsis tenuirostris Benedict, 1902

= Munidopsis serricornis =

Species of crustacean

Munidopsis serricornis is a species of squat lobster. It is widely distributed in the world's oceans, being found in the eastern Atlantic Ocean (from Iceland and Norway to the Cape Verde Islands), the western Atlantic Ocean (from the United States to the Gulf of Mexico), and the Indo-Pacific (from Australia and the Malay Archipelago to Madagascar). It grows up to a carapace length of 20 millimetres (0.8 in).

M. serricornis appears to be one of the most abundant megafauna species in the cold water coral reefs of southern Norway. It has also been observed in association with the gorgonian Acanthogorgia.

M. serricornis was the first species of the current genus Munidopsis to be described, when Sven Lovén described it (as Galathea serricornis) in 1852. It was described independently in 1857 under the name Galathea tridentata by Laurits Esmark.
