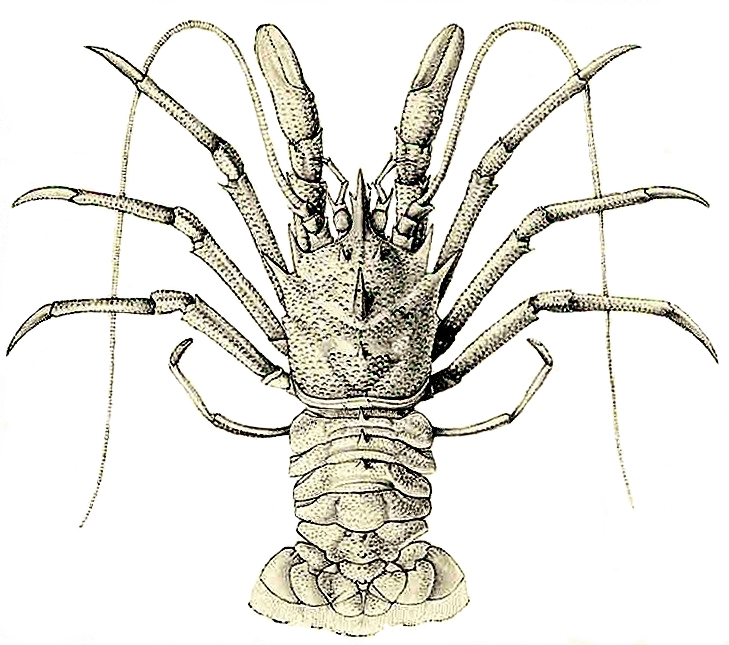
- Galacantha rostrata

Scientific classification
- Domain: Eukaryota
- Kingdom: Animalia
- Phylum: Arthropoda
- Class: Malacostraca
- Order: Decapoda
- Suborder: Pleocyemata
- Infraorder: Anomura
- Family: Munidopsidae
- Genus: Galacantha; Milne-Edwards, 1880

= Galacantha =

Genus of crustaceans

Galacantha is a genus of squat lobsters in the family Munidopsidae, containing the following species:

- Galacantha bellis Henderson, 1885
- Galacantha bellula Osawa, Lin & Chan, 2013
- Galacantha diomedeae Faxon, 1893
- Galacantha galeata Komai, 2011
- Galacantha quiquei Macpherson, 2007
- Galacantha rostrata A. Milne Edwards, 1880
- Galacantha spinosa A. Milne Edwards, 1880
- Galacantha subrostrata Macpherson, 2007
- Galacantha subspinosa Macpherson, 2007
- Galacantha trachynotus Anderson, 1896
- Galacantha valdiviae Balss, 1913
