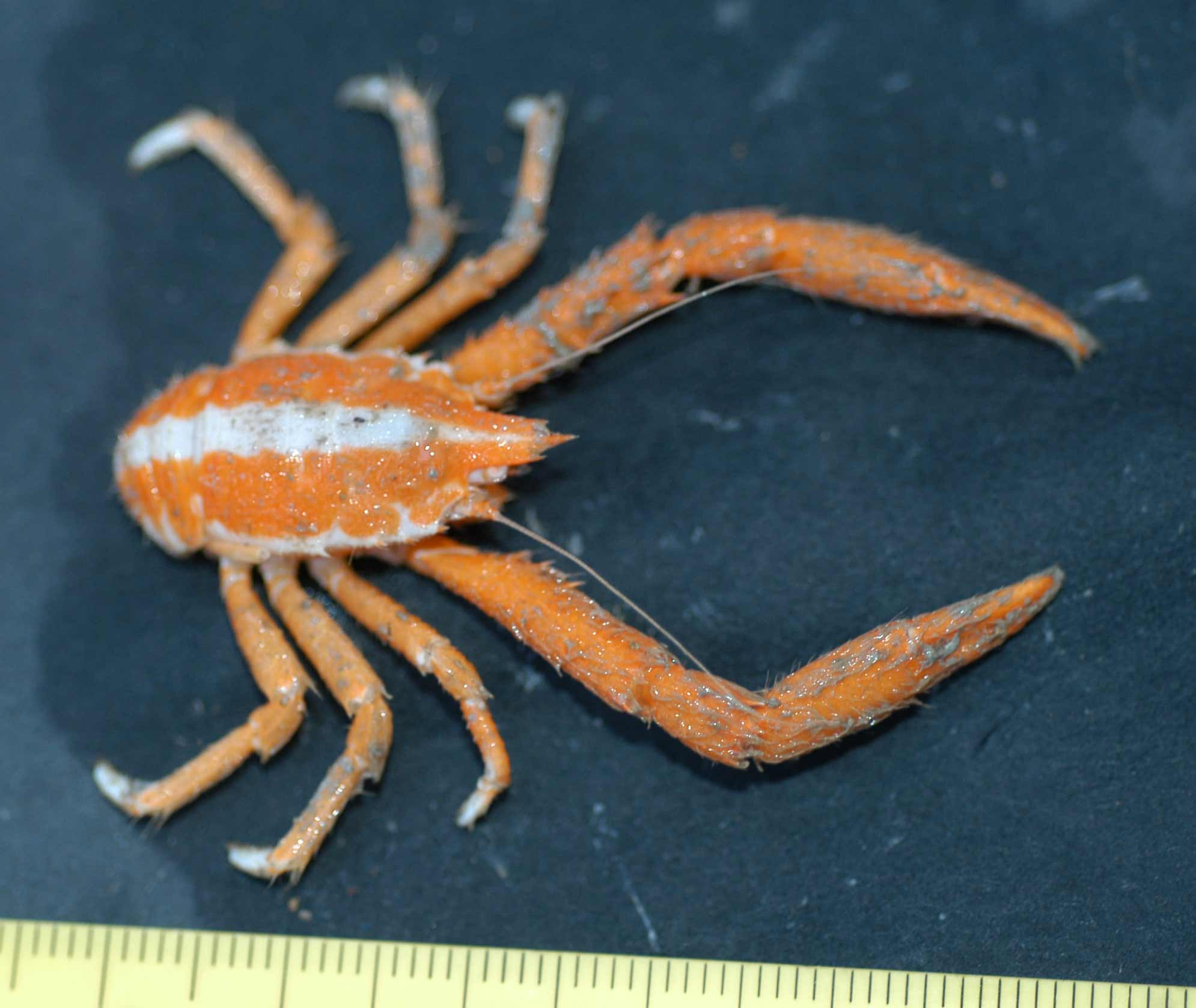
- Munidopsis serricornis

Scientific classification
- Kingdom: Animalia
- Phylum: Arthropoda
- Clade: Pancrustacea
- Class: Malacostraca
- Order: Decapoda
- Suborder: Pleocyemata
- Infraorder: Anomura
- Family: Munidopsidae
- Genus: Munidopsis; Whiteaves, 1874

Type species
- Munidopsis curvirostra Whiteaves, 1874

= Munidopsis =

Munidopsis Temporal range: Campanian–Recent

Genus of crustaceans

Munidopsis is a genus of squat lobster. It is the second largest of all the genera of squat lobsters, after Munida, with over 200 species. Its members are mainly found on continental slopes and on abyssal plains. A few fossil species are also known, including specimens from the Campanian (Cretaceous).

== Diversity ==
There are currently over 230 known species.

== Distribution ==
Munidopsis, like other squat lobsters, are often found in chemosynthetic environments in the ocean.

Munidopsis was the first confirmed genus to inhabit the underwater Mud volcano habitat.

Most Munidopsis species are found in the deep sea at depths more than 5300m.

In 2022, during surveys of the wreck of the Endurance, a squat lobster believed to be an unidentified species in the Munidopsis genus was observed.

== Historical significance ==
The genus Munidopsis dates back to the Eocene and Upper Cretaceous of Antarctica.

== Species ==
The described living species are as follows:

- Munidopsis abbreviata (A. Milne-Edwards, 1880)
- Munidopsis abdominalis (A. Milne-Edwards, 1880)
- Munidopsis abyssicola Baba, 2005
- Munidopsis abyssorum A. Milne-Edwards & Bouvier, 1897
- Munidopsis acalipha Macpherson, 2007
- Munidopsis acuminata Benedict, 1902
- Munidopsis acuta (A. Milne-Edwards, 1881)
- Munidopsis acutispina Benedict, 1902
- Munidopsis africana Balss, 1913
- Munidopsis agassizii Faxon, 1893
- Munidopsis ahyongi (Dong & Li, 2021)
- Munidopsis alaminos Pequegnat & Pequegnat, 1970
- Munidopsis albatrossae Pequegnat & Pequegnat, 1973
- Munidopsis allae Khodkina & Duris, 1989
- Munidopsis alvisca Williams, 1988
- Munidopsis analoga Macpherson, 2007
- Munidopsis andamanica MacGilchrist, 1905
- Munidopsis anemia Macpherson & Segonzac, 2005
- Munidopsis antonii (Filhol, 1884)
- Munidopsis arenula Macpherson, 2007
- Munidopsis ariadne Macpherson, 2011
- Munidopsis aries (A. Milne-Edwards, 1880)
- Munidopsis arietina Alcock & Anderson, 1894
- Munidopsis armata (A. Milne-Edwards, 1880)
- Munidopsis asiatica Marin, 2020
- Munidopsis aspera (Henderson, 1885)
- Munidopsis austellus Macpherson, 2007
- Munidopsis aurantia Lin & Chan, 2011
- Munidopsis bairdii (Smith, 1884)
- Munidopsis barbarae (Boone, 1927)
- Munidopsis barrerai Bahamonde, 1964
- Munidopsis beringana Benedict, 1902
- Munidopsis bermudezi Chace, 1939
- Munidopsis bhavasagara (Tiwari, Padate, Cubelio, & Osawa, 2022)
- Munidopsis bispinata Miyake & Baba, 1970
- Munidopsis bispinoculata Baba, 1988
- Munidopsis bractea Ahyong, 2007
- Munidopsis bracteosa Jones & Macpherson, 2007
- Munidopsis bradleyi Pequegnat & Pequegnat, 1971
- Munidopsis brevimanus (A. Milne-Edwards, 1880)
- Munidopsis bruta Macpherson, 2007
- Munidopsis calvata Macpherson, 2007
- Munidopsis camelus (Ortmann, 1892)
- Munidopsis carinimarginata Baba, 1988
- Munidopsis carinipes Faxon, 1893
- Munidopsis carolinensis (Dong & Li, 2021)
- Munidopsis cascadia Ambler, 1980
- Munidopsis centrina Alcock & Anderson, 1894
- Munidopsis ceratophthalma Alcock, 1901
- Munidopsis ceres Macpherson, 2007
- Munidopsis chacei Kensley, 1968
- Munidopsis chunii Balss, 1913
- Munidopsis cidaris Baba, 1994
- Munidopsis cochlearis Khodkina, 1973
- Munidopsis colombiana Pequegnat & Pequegnat, 1971
- Munidopsis comarge Taylor, Ahyong & Andreakis, 2010
- Munidopsis concava Macpherson, 2007
- Munidopsis cornuata Macpherson, 2007
- Munidopsis cortesi Rodríguez-Flores, Seid, Rouse & Giribet, 2023
- Munidopsis crassa Smith, 1885
- Munidopsis crenatirostris Baba, 1988
- Munidopsis crinita Faxon, 1893
- Munidopsis cubensis Chace, 1942
- Munidopsis curvimana Whiteaves, 1874
- Munidopsis curvirostra Whiteaves, 1874
- Munidopsis cylindrophthalma (Alcock, 1894)
- Munidopsis cylindropus Benedict, 1902
- Munidopsis dasypus Alcock, 1894
- Munidopsis debilis (Henderson, 1885)
- Munidopsis demeter Macpherson, 2007
- Munidopsis dentifalx Osawa, Lin & Chan, 2007
- Munidopsis denudata Macpherson, 2007
- Munidopsis depressa Faxon, 1893
- Munidopsis dispar Dong, Gan & Li, 2021
- Munidopsis echinata Osawa, Lin & Chan, 2008
- Munidopsis edwardsii (Wood–Mason, 1891)
- Munidopsis erinacea (A. Milne-Edwards, 1880)
- Munidopsis espinis Benedict, 1902
- Munidopsis expansa Benedict, 1902
- Munidopsis exuta Macpherson & Segonzac, 2005
- Munidopsis follirostris Khodkina, 1973
- Munidopsis formosa Wu & Chan, 2000
- Munidopsis geyeri Pequegnat & Pequegnat, 1970
- Munidopsis gibbosa Baba, 1978
- Munidopsis gilli Benedict, 1902
- Munidopsis girguisi Rodríguez-Flores, Seid, Rouse & Giribet, 2023
- Munidopsis glabra Pequegnat & Williams, 1995
- Munidopsis gladiola Macpherson, 2007
- Munidopsis goodridgii Alcock & Anderson, 1899
- Munidopsis gracilis Cubelio, Tsuchida & Watanabe, 2008
- Munidopsis granosa Alcock, 1901
- Munidopsis granosicorium Williams & Baba, 1989
- Munidopsis granulata Miyake & Baba, 1967
- Munidopsis granulens Mayo, 1972
- Munidopsis gulfensis Pequegnat & Pequegnat, 1970
- Munidopsis guochuani Dong, Gan & Li, 2021
- Munidopsis hamata Faxon, 1893
- Munidopsis hemingi Alcock & Anderson, 1899
- Munidopsis hendersoniana Faxon, 1893
- Munidopsis hendrickxi Rodríguez-Flores, Seid, Rouse & Giribet, 2023
- Munidopsis hirsuta Jones & Macpherson, 2007
- Munidopsis hirsutissima Balss, 1913
- Munidopsis hirtella Macpherson & Segonzac, 2005
- Munidopsis hystrix Faxon, 1893
- Munidopsis inermis Faxon, 1893
- Munidopsis iridis Alcock & Anderson, 1899
- Munidopsis kaiyoae Baba, 1974
- Munidopsis kareenae Ahyong, 2013
- Munidopsis keijii Macpherson, 2007
- Munidopsis kensleyi Ahyong & Poore, 2004
- Munidopsis kensmithi Jones & Macpherson, 2007
- Munidopsis kermadec Cubelio, Tsuchida & Watanabe, 2007
- Munidopsis kexueae Dong, Gan & Li, 2021
- Munidopsis kucki Baba & Camp, 1988
- Munidopsis kurilensis (Marin, 2020)
- Munidopsis laciniosa Baba, 2005
- Munidopsis laevigata (Henderson, 1885)
- Munidopsis laevisquama Lin & Chan, 2011
- Munidopsis latiangulata Osawa, Lin & Chan, 2006
- Munidopsis laticorpus Cubelio, Tsuchida & Watanabe, 2008
- Munidopsis latifrons (A. Milne-Edwards, 1880)
- Munidopsis latimana Miyake & Baba, 1966
- Munidopsis latirostris (Faxon, 1895)
- Munidopsis lauensis Baba & de Saint Laurent, 1992
- Munidopsis laurentae Macpherson & Segonzac, 2005
- Munidopsis lentigo Williams & Van Dover, 1983
- Munidopsis lenzii Balss, 1913
- Munidopsis leptotes Macpherson, 2007
- Munidopsis levis (Alcock & Anderson, 1894)
- Munidopsis lignaria Williams & Baba, 1989
- Munidopsis livida (Perrier, 1886)
- Munidopsis longimanus (A. Milne-Edwards, 1880)
- Munidopsis longispinosa Cubelio, Tsuchida & Watanabe, 2007
- Munidopsis lophia Macpherson, 2007
- Munidopsis mandelai Macpherson, Amon & Clark, 2014
- Munidopsis margarita Faxon, 1893
- Munidopsis marginata (Henderson, 1885)
- Munidopsis marianica Williams & Baba, 1989
- Munidopsis marionis (A. Milne-Edwards, 1881)
- Munidopsis maunga Schnabel & Bruce, 2006
- Munidopsis messingi Rodríguez-Flores, Bracken-Grissom, Lemaitre, Felder & Nizinski, 2025
- Munidopsis miersii (Henderson, 1885)
- Munidopsis milleri Henderson, 1885
- Munidopsis mina Benedict, 1902
- Munidopsis modesta Benedict, 1902
- Munidopsis moresbyi Alcock & Anderson, 1899
- Munidopsis myojinensis Cubelio, Tsuchida, Hendrickx, Kado & Watanabe, 2007
- Munidopsis naginata Cubelio, Tsuchida & Watanabe, 2007
- Munidopsis nautilus Rodríguez-Flores, Seid, Rouse & Giribet, 2023
- Munidopsis nereidis Macpherson, 2007
- Munidopsis nitida (A. Milne-Edwards, 1880)
- Munidopsis norfanz Ahyong, 2007
- Munidopsis opalescens Benedict, 1902
- Munidopsis orcina McArdle, 1901
- Munidopsis ornata Faxon, 1893
- Munidopsis pallida Alcock, 1894
- Munidopsis palmatus Khodkina, 1973
- Munidopsis panamae Baba, 2005
- Munidopsis papanui Schnabel & Bruce, 2006
- Munidopsis parfaiti (Filhol, 1885)
- Munidopsis pectinata Macpherson, 2007
- Munidopsis penescabra Pequegnat & Williams, 1995
- Munidopsis pericalla Macpherson, 2007
- Munidopsis petalorhyncha Baba, 2005
- Munidopsis petila Baba, 2005
- Munidopsis piipa (Marin, 2020)
- Munidopsis pilosa Henderson, 1885
- Munidopsis platirostris (A. Milne-Edwards & Bouvier, 1894)
- Munidopsis plumatisetigera Baba, 1988
- Munidopsis polita (Smith, 1883)
- Munidopsis polymorpha Koelbel, 1892
- Munidopsis poseidonia Alcock & Anderson, 1894
- Munidopsis proales Ahyong & Poore, 2004
- Munidopsis producta Baba, 2005
- Munidopsis profunda Baba, 2005
- Munidopsis pubescens Macpherson, 2007
- Munidopsis pycnopoda Baba, 2005
- Munidopsis quadrata Faxon, 1893
- Munidopsis ramahtaylorae Pequegnat & Pequegnat, 1971
- Munidopsis recta Baba, 2005
- Munidopsis regia Alcock & Anderson, 1894
- Munidopsis reynoldsi (A. Milne-Edwards, 1880)
- Munidopsis riveroi Chace, 1939
- Munidopsis robusta (A. Milne-Edwards, 1880)
- Munidopsis rotundior Baba, 2005
- Munidopsis ryukyuensis Cubelio, Tsuchida & Watanabe, 2007
- Munidopsis sarissa Lin, Osawa & Chan, 2007
- Munidopsis scabra Faxon, 1893
- Munidopsis scobina Alcock, 1894
- Munidopsis scotti Jones & Macpherson, 2007
- Munidopsis segonzaci Jones & Macpherson, 2007
- Munidopsis senticosa (Rodriguez-Flores, Macpherson, & Machordom, 2018)
- Munidopsis sericea Faxon, 1893
- Munidopsis serratifrons (A. Milne-Edwards, 1880)
- Munidopsis serricornis (Lovén, 1852)
- Munidopsis sharreri (A. Milne-Edwards, 1880)
- Munidopsis sigsbei (A. Milne-Edwards, 1880)
- Munidopsis similior Baba, 1988
- Munidopsis similis Smith, 1885
- Munidopsis simplex (A. Milne-Edwards, 1880)
- Munidopsis sinclairi McArdle, 1901
- Munidopsis snelliusae Baba, 1977
- Munidopsis solidissima Macpherson, 2007
- Munidopsis sonne Baba, 1995
- Munidopsis spinifer (A. Milne-Edwards, 1880)
- Munidopsis spinifrons (Dong, Xu, Li, & Wang, 2019)
- Munidopsis spinihirsuta Lloyd, 1907
- Munidopsis spinipes MacGilchrist, 1905
- Munidopsis spinoculata (A. Milne-Edwards, 1880)
- Munidopsis spissata Macpherson, 2007
- Munidopsis squamosa (A. Milne-Edwards, 1880)
- Munidopsis starmer Baba & de Saint Laurent, 1992
- Munidopsis strigula Macpherson, 2007
- Munidopsis stylirostris Wood-Mason, 1891
- Munidopsis subchelata Balss, 1913
- Munidopsis subspinoculata Pequegnat & Pequegnat, 1971
- Munidopsis subsquamosa Henderson, 1885
- Munidopsis tafrii Osawa, Lin & Chan, 2006
- Munidopsis taiwanica Osawa, Lin & Chan, 2008
- Munidopsis talismani A. Milne-Edwards & Bouvier, 1894
- Munidopsis tanneri Faxon, 1893
- Munidopsis tasmaniae Ahyong & Poore, 2004
- Munidopsis taurulus Ortmann, 1892
- Munidopsis teretis Baba, 2005
- Munidopsis ternaria Macpherson, 2007
- Munidopsis testuda Rodríguez-Flores, Seid, Rouse & Giribet, 2023
- Munidopsis thieli Türkay, 1975
- Munidopsis tiburon Jones & Macpherson, 2007
- Munidopsis townsendi Benedict, 1902
- Munidopsis trachypus Alcock & Anderson, 1894
- Munidopsis transtridens Pequegnat & Pequegnat, 1971
- Munidopsis treis Ahyong & Poore, 2004
- Munidopsis trichodes Macpherson, 2007
- Munidopsis tridens (A. Milne-Edwards, 1880)
- Munidopsis trifida Henderson, 1885
- Munidopsis tropeorhyncha Miyake & Baba, 1970
- Munidopsis truculenta Macpherson & Segonzac, 2005
- Munidopsis tuberipes Komai, 2011
- Munidopsis tuberosa Osawa, Lin & Chan, 2008
- Munidopsis tuftsi Ambler, 1980
- Munidopsis turgida Rodriguez-Flores, Macpherson, & Machordom, 2018
- Munidopsis unguifera Alcock & Anderson, 1894
- Munidopsis vaillantii (A. Milne-Edwards, 1881)
- Munidopsis verrilli Benedict, 1902
- Munidopsis verrucosus Khodkina, 1973
- Munidopsis vesper Taylor, Ahyong & Andreakis, 2010
- Munidopsis vicina Faxon, 1893
- Munidopsis victoriae Baba & Poore, 2002
- Munidopsis villosa Faxon, 1893
- Munidopsis vrijenhoeki Jones & Macpherson, 2007
- Munidopsis wardeni Anderson, 1896
- Munidopsis yaquinensis Ambler, 1980
- Munidopsis zarazagai Macpherson, 2007
