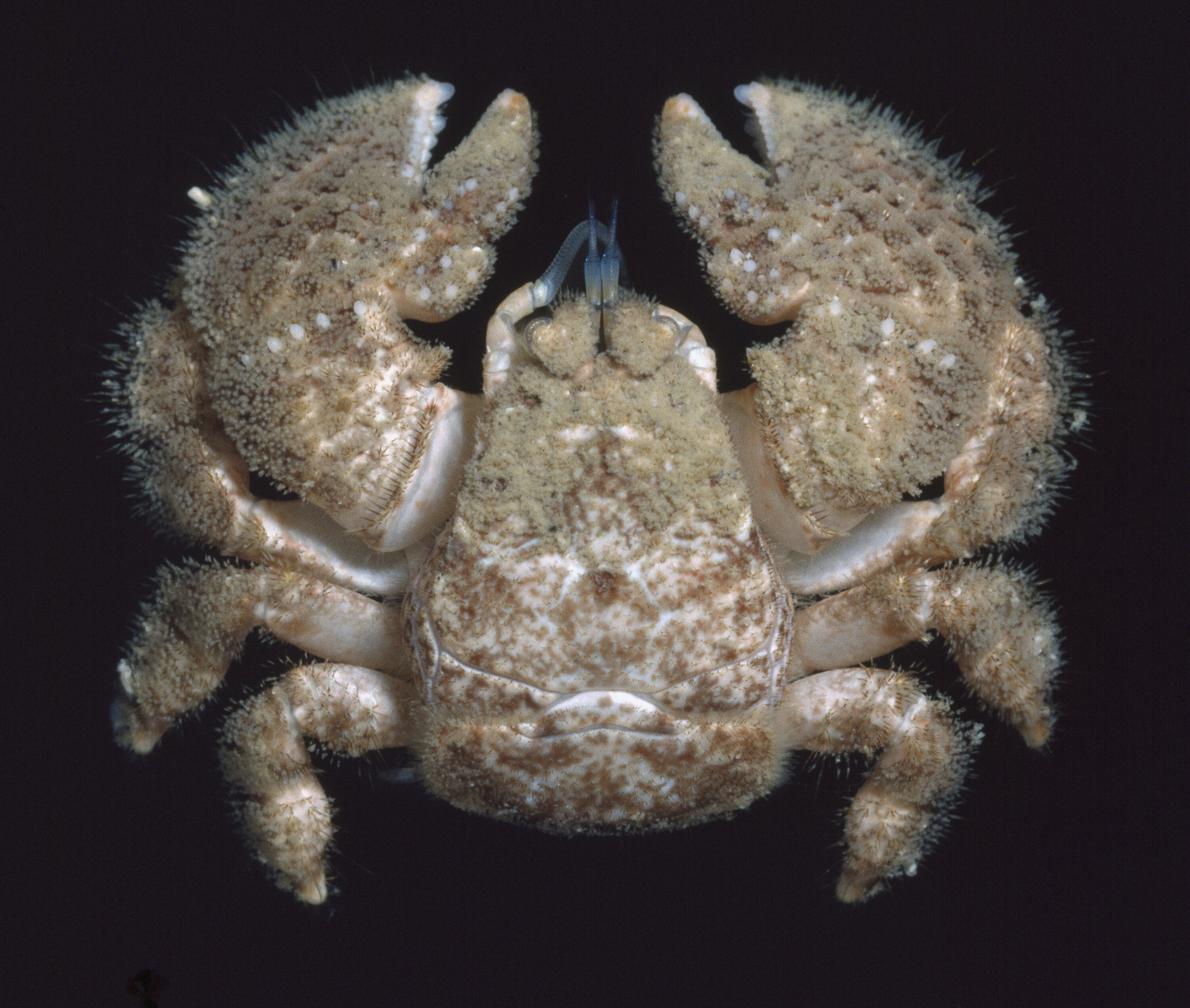

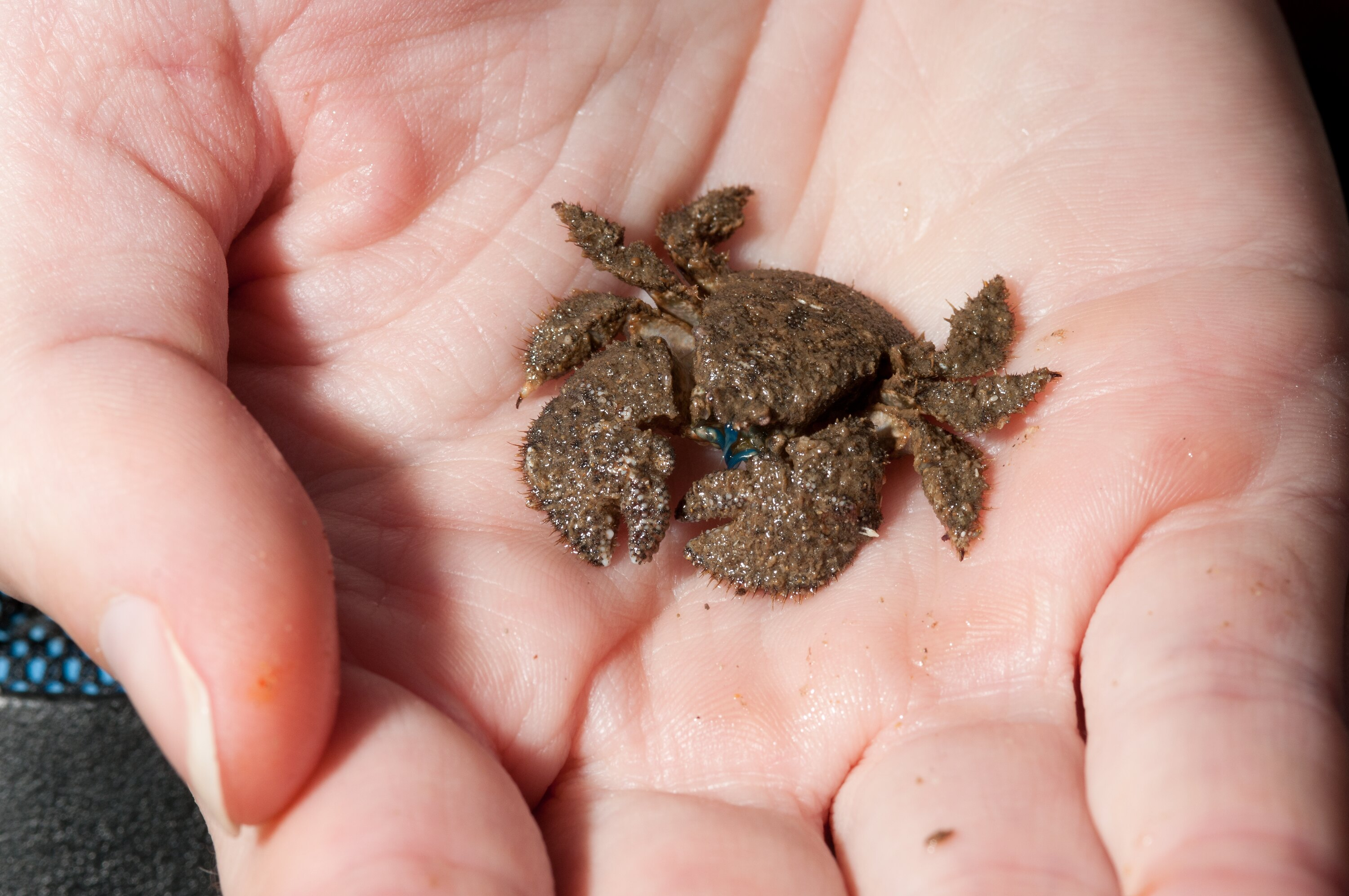

Scientific classification
- Kingdom: Animalia
- Phylum: Arthropoda
- Class: Malacostraca
- Order: Decapoda
- Suborder: Pleocyemata
- Infraorder: Anomura
- Superfamily: Lomisoidea; Bouvier, 1895
- Family: Lomisidae; Bouvier, 1895 (Note: The name "Lomidae" may also be encountered, but is incorrect.)
- Genus: Lomis; H. Milne Edwards, 1837
- Species: L. hirta

Binomial name
- Lomis hirta (Lamarck, 1818)

= Hairy stone crab =

Species of crustacean

The hairy stone crab (Lomis hirta) is a crab-like anomuran crustacean that lives in the littoral zone of southern Australia from Bunbury, Western Australia, to the Bass Strait. It is the only species in the family Lomisidae. It is 1.5–2.5 cm (0.6–1.0 in) wide, slow-moving, and covered in brown hair which camouflages it against the rocks upon which it lives.

Some controversy exists about the relationship between L. hirta and the other anomuran families. Candidates for its closest relatives have included hermit crabs, specifically king crabs, and Aegla. It is clear, however, that Lomis represents a separate case of carcinisation.
