= Pylojacquesidae =

Scientific classification
- Kingdom: Animalia
- Phylum: Arthropoda
- Clade: Pancrustacea
- Class: Malacostraca
- Order: Decapoda
- Suborder: Pleocyemata
- Infraorder: Anomura
- Superfamily: Paguroidea
- Family: Pylojacquesidae; McLaughlin & Lemaitre, 2001

Genera
- Pylojacquesia McLaughlin & Lemaitre, 2001; Lemaitreopsis McLaughlin, 2007

Family of crustaceans

The Pylojacquesidae are a small family of hermit crabs, comprising only two monotypic genera. The family was erected in 2001, after two specimens at Museum für Naturkunde at the Humboldt University of Berlin were recognised as being quite distinct from other described hermit crabs. The family members differ from other hermit crabs in that their mandibles are chitinous and toothed.

== Pylojacquesia ==
Pylojacquesia is monotypic, the sole species being Pylojacquesia colemani. It was described in 2001, based on two specimens discovered in the Museum für Naturkunde. The specimens had been collected in 1875 by the S.M.S. Gazelle at 26°51.1′S 153°29.6′E in the Coral Sea, off the coast of Brisbane, Australia. It lives in the tubes secreted by serpulid worms of the genus Protula (Annelida: Serpulidae) in sandy areas of the continental shelf. The specific name commemorates Charles Oliver Coleman, curator of Crustacea at the Museum für Naturkunde.

== Lemaitreopsis ==
Lemaitreopsis is monotypic, the sole species being Lemaitreopsis holmi. It was described in 2007, based on a single female collected on September 20, 1986, at 22°40.39′S 167°41.39′E near the Isle of Pines, New Caledonia. The genus name Lemaitreopsis commemorates Rafael Lemaitre of the Smithsonian Institution, while the specific name commemorates the malacologist George P. Holm. The holotype is kept at the Muséum national d'histoire naturelle in Paris.
