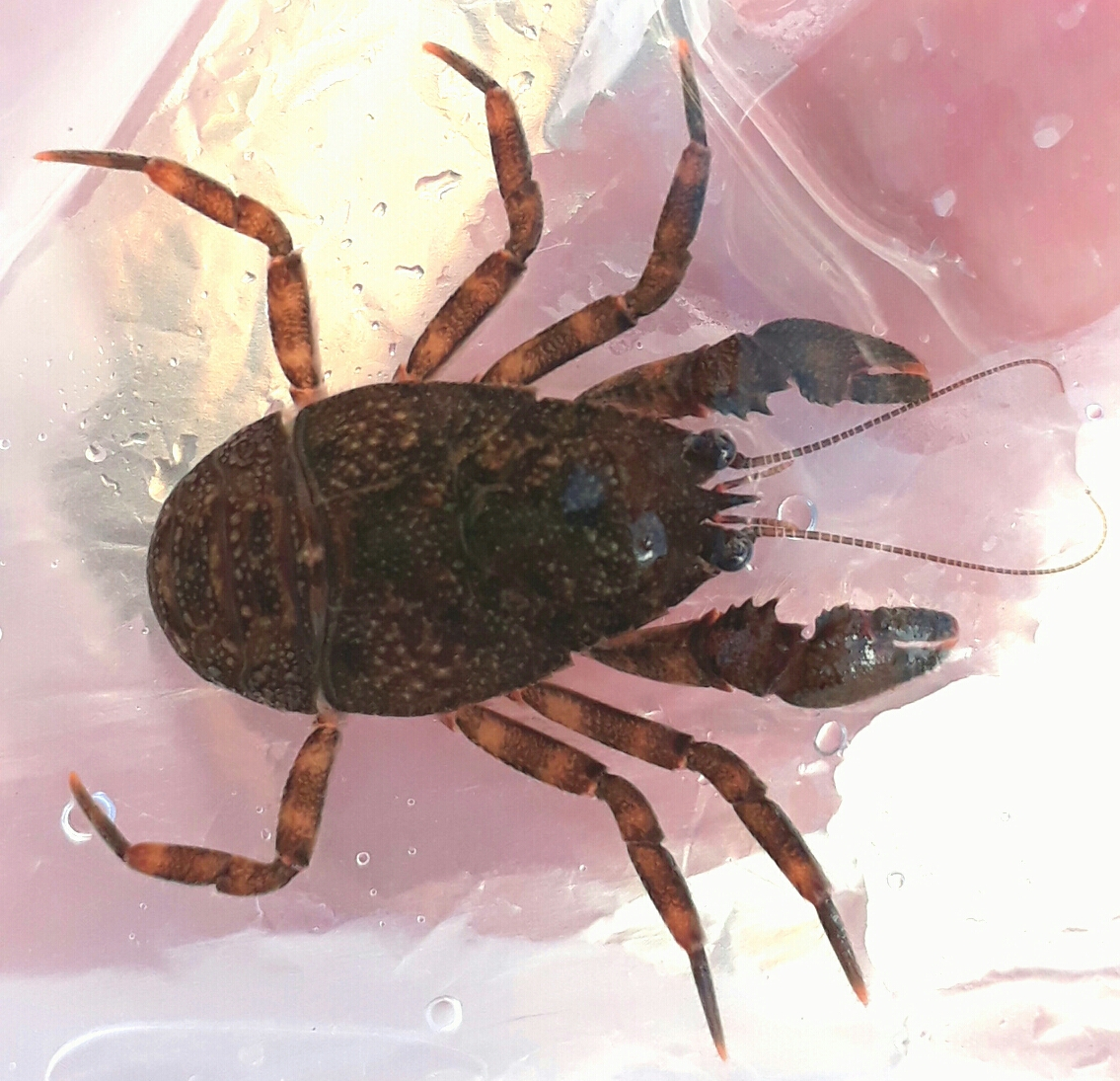

Scientific classification
- Kingdom: Animalia
- Phylum: Arthropoda
- Clade: Pancrustacea
- Class: Malacostraca
- Order: Decapoda
- Suborder: Pleocyemata
- Clade: Reptantia
- Infraorder: Anomura
- Superfamily: Aegloidea; Dana, 1852
- Family: Aeglidae; Dana, 1852

Genera
- Aegla Leach, 1820; †Haumuriaegla Feldmann, 1984; †Protaegla Feldmann et al., 1998

= Aeglidae =

Aeglidae Temporal range: Albian–Recent

Family of crustaceans

Aeglidae, commonly known as pancoras are a family of freshwater crustaceans of South America. They are the only fresh water anomurans except for the hermit crab Clibanarius fonticola of Vanuatu. They live between 20° S and 50° S, at depths of up to 320 m in Chilean lakes and altitudes of up to about 3,500 m.

== Description ==
Pancoras resemble squat lobsters in that the abdomen is partly tucked under the thorax. The notable sexual dimorphism in the abdomen is related to the behaviour of carrying fertilised eggs on the pleopods. The carapace length of the largest species may approach 6 cm (2.4 in), but most are considerably smaller.

The internal anatomy has been described for Aegla cholchol and generally resembles that of other anomurans, particularly galatheoid squat lobsters. The morphology of the antennal gland bladder differs from that in other anomurans in having a twisted tubular structure which was interpreted as an adaption to the freshwater lifestyle.

== Classification ==
Aeglidae is thought to have originated around 75 million years ago and originally inhabited marine environments. The animals began colonizing South America during the Oligocene. They started from the Pacific Coast, and as time went on, slowly spread across the entire continent.

Aegla, the only extant genus in the family, contains around 74 described extant species. Of the 63 species and subspecies described by 2008, two are found in lakes, four in caves, and the remaining 57 are found mainly in rivers. 42 species are found in Brazil, all restricted to the country's southern and southeastern regions (Rio Grande do Sul alone is home to 24). Other countries with species are Argentina, Bolivia, Chile, Paraguay and Uruguay. More than a third of the species are considered threatened, and in Brazil alone 26 species are officially recognized as threatened, including 8 critically endangered.

=== Phylogeny ===
The placement of Aeglidae within Anomura can be shown in the 2026 cladogram found below.

- Brachyura ("true" crabs)
- Anomura
  - Galatheoidea
    - Porcellanidae (porcelain crabs)
    - - Munidopsidae (squat lobsters)
      - - Galatheidae (squat lobsters)
        - Munididae (squat lobsters)
  - - - - Pagurus longicarpus
        - - Lithodidae (king crabs)
          - Paguridae
      - - Pylochelidae (symmetrical hermit crabs)
        - - Lomisidae (hairy stone crabs)
          - - Aeglidae (pancoras)
            - Chirostyloidea
              - Kiwaidae (yeti crabs)
              - Sternostylidae
    - - Hippoidea
        - Blepharipodidae (mole crabs)
        - - Albuneidae (mole crabs)
          - Hippidae (mole crabs)
      - Paguroidea
        - Diogenidae (left-handed hermit crabs)
        - Coenobitidae (terrestrial hermit crabs)

=== List of species ===
This list contains all the described species as of 2013: (Note: List comprises species listed by McLaughlin et al. (2010), with updates from Santos et al. (2012) and Santos et al. (2013).)

- Aegla abtao Schmitt, 1942
- Aegla affinis Schmitt, 1942
- Aegla alacalufi Jara & López, 1981
- Aegla araucaniensis Jara, 1980
- Aegla bahamondei Jara, 1982
- Aegla brevipalma Bond-Buckup & Santos in Santos et al., 2012
- Aegla camargoi Buckup & Rossi, 1977
- Aegla castro Schmitt, 1942
- Aegla cavernicola Türkay, 1972
- Aegla cholchol Jara & Palacios, 1999
- Aegla concepcionensis Schmitt, 1942
- Aegla denticulata Nicolet, 1849
- Aegla expansa Jara, 1992
- Aegla franca Schmitt, 1942
- Aegla franciscana Buckup & Rossi, 1977
- Aegla georginae Santos & Jara in Santos et al., 2013
- Aegla grisella Bond-Buckup & Buckup, 1994
- Aegla hueicollensis Jara & Palacios, 1999
- Aegla humahuaca Schmitt, 1942
- Aegla inconspicua Bond-Buckup & Buckup, 1994
- Aegla inermis Bond-Buckup & Buckup, 1994
- Aegla intercalata Bond-Buckup & Buckup, 1994
- Aegla intermedia Girard, 1855
- Aegla itacolomiensis Bond-Buckup & Buckup, 1994
- Aegla jarai Bond-Buckup & Buckup, 1994
- Aegla jujuyana Schmitt, 1942
- Aegla laevis (Latreille, 1818)
- Aegla lata Bond-Buckup & Buckup, 1994
- Aegla leachi Bond-Buckup & Buckup in Santos et al., 2012
- Aegla leptochela Bond-Buckup & Buckup, 1994
- Aegla leptodactyla Buckup & Rossi, 1977
- Aegla ligulata Bond-Buckup & Buckup, 1994
- Aegla longirostri Bond-Buckup & Buckup, 1994
- Aegla ludwigi Santos & Jara in Santos et al., 2013
- Aegla manni Jara, 1980
- Aegla marginata Bond-Buckup & Buckup, 1994
- Aegla manuniflata Bond-Buckup & Santos in Santos et al., 2009
- Aegla microphthalma Bond-Buckup & Buckup, 1994
- Aegla muelleri Bond-Buckup & Buckup in Bond-Buckup et al., 2010
- Aegla neuquensis Schmitt, 1942
- Aegla oblata Bond-Buckup & Santos in Santos et al., 2012
- Aegla obstipa Bond-Buckup & Buckup, 1994
- Aegla occidentalis Jara, Pérez-Losada & Crandall, 2003
- Aegla odebrechtii Müller, 1876
- Aegla papudo Schmitt, 1942
- Aegla parana Schmitt, 1942
- Aegla parva Bond-Buckup & Buckup, 1994
- Aegla paulensis Schmitt, 1942
- Aegla perobae Hebling & Rodrigues, 1977
- Aegla pewenchae Jara, 1994
- Aegla plana Buckup & Rossi, 1977
- Aegla platensis Schmitt, 1942
- Aegla pomerana Bond-Buckup & Buckup in Bond-Buckup et al., 2010
- Aegla prado Schmitt, 1942
- Aegla renana Bond-Buckup & Santos in Santos et al., 2010
- Aegla ringueleti Bond-Buckup & Buckup, 1994
- Aegla riolimayana Schmitt, 1942
- Aegla rossiana Bond-Buckup & Buckup, 1994
- Aegla rostrata Jara, 1977
- Aegla saltensis Bond-Buckup & Jara in Bond-Buckup et al., 2010
- Aegla sanlorenzo Schmitt, 1942
- Aegla scamosa Ringuelet, 1948
- Aegla schmitti Hobbs III, 1979
- Aegla septentrionalis Bond-Buckup & Buckup, 1994
- Aegla serrana Buckup & Rossi, 1977
- Aegla singularis Ringuelet, 1948
- Aegla spectabilis Jara, 1986
- Aegla spinipalma Bond-Buckup & Buckup, 1994
- Aegla spinosa Bond-Buckup & Buckup, 1994
- Aegla strinatii Türkay, 1972
- Aegla talcahuano Schmitt, 1942
- Aegla uruguayana Schmitt, 1942
- Aegla violacea Bond-Buckup & Buckup, 1994

=== Fossil taxa ===
==== Haumuriaegla ====
Haumuriaegla glaessneri is a species known only from fossils of Haumurian age (Late Cretaceous) found near Cheviot, New Zealand. At the time of its discovery, Haumuriaegla was the only known fossil from the family and the only marine member.

==== Protaegla ====
Protaegla miniscula was discovered in rocks of Albian age from the Tlayúa Formation, near Tepexi de Rodríguez, Mexico.

== Behavior and life history ==
=== Diet ===
Pancoras are omnivorous, preferring plant matter, but also eating adult insects, molluscs, fish and fly larvae.

=== Mating and reproduction ===
Mating is preceded by a period of courtship, and does not coincide with moulting, as it does in many other decapods. The eggs of pancoras hatch as juveniles which closely resemble the adults. They are cared for by their parents and live at the bottom of the body of water.
