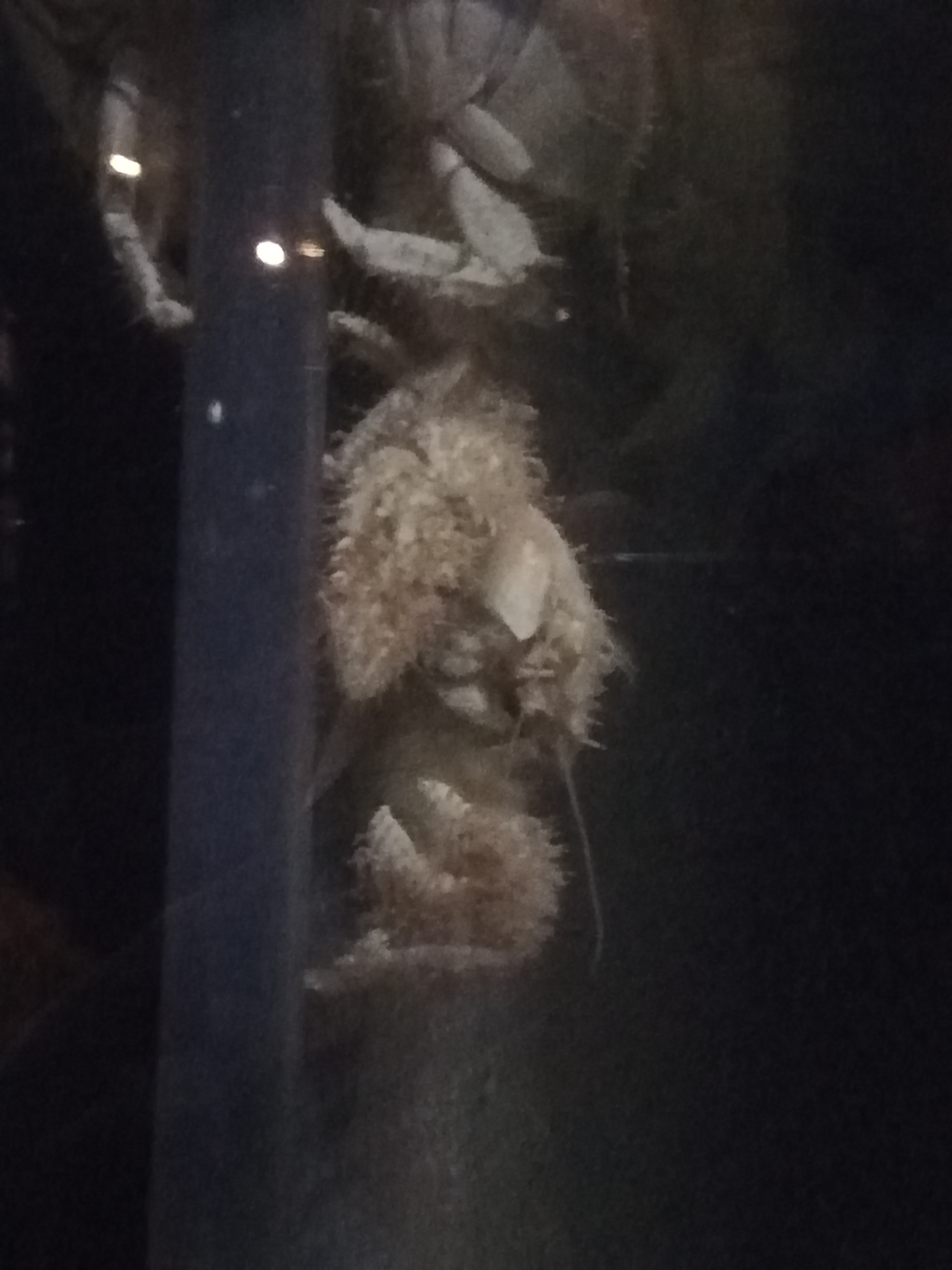

Scientific classification
- Kingdom: Animalia
- Phylum: Arthropoda
- Clade: Pancrustacea
- Class: Malacostraca
- Order: Decapoda
- Suborder: Pleocyemata
- Infraorder: Anomura
- Family: Munidopsidae
- Genus: Shinkaia; Baba & Williams, 1998
- Species: S. crosnieri

Binomial name
- Shinkaia crosnieri Baba & Williams, 1998

= Shinkaia =

Genus of crustaceans

Shinkaia crosnieri is a species of squat lobster in a monotypic genus in the family Munidopsidae. S. crosnieri lives in deep-sea hydrothermal vent ecosystems, living off of the chemosynthetic activity of certain bacteria living on its setae.
