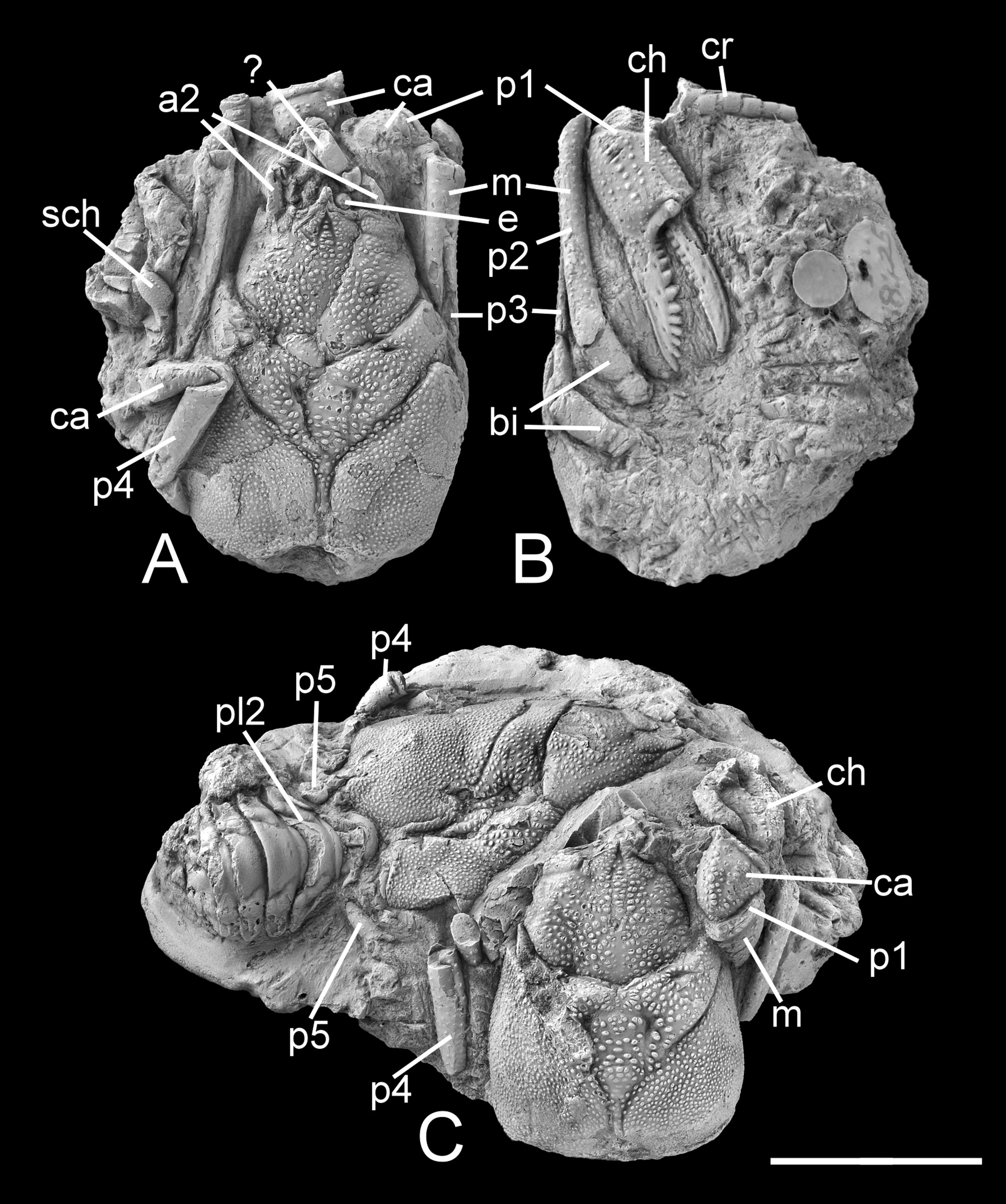
- Holotype (top) and paratype (bottom) specimens

Scientific classification
- Kingdom: Animalia
- Phylum: Arthropoda
- Clade: Pancrustacea
- Class: Malacostraca
- Order: Decapoda
- Suborder: Pleocyemata
- Infraorder: Brachyura
- Family: †Eocarcinidae; Withers, 1932
- Genus: †Eocarcinus; Withers, 1932
- Species: †E. praecursor

Binomial name
- †Eocarcinus praecursor Withers, 1932

= Eocarcinus =

Eocarcinus Temporal range: Pliensbachian

Extinct genus of crustaceans

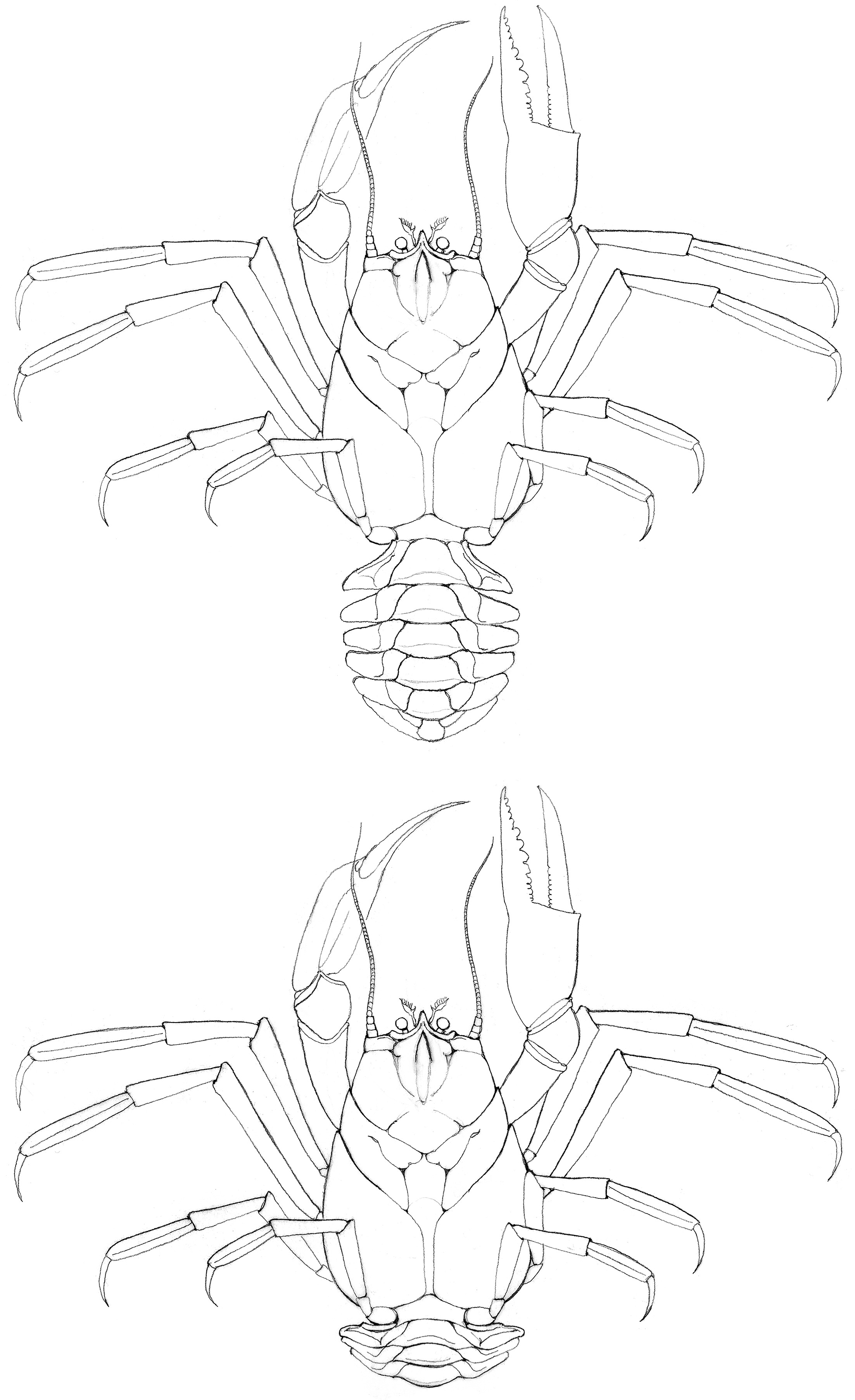
Reconstruction based on 2020 reanalysis

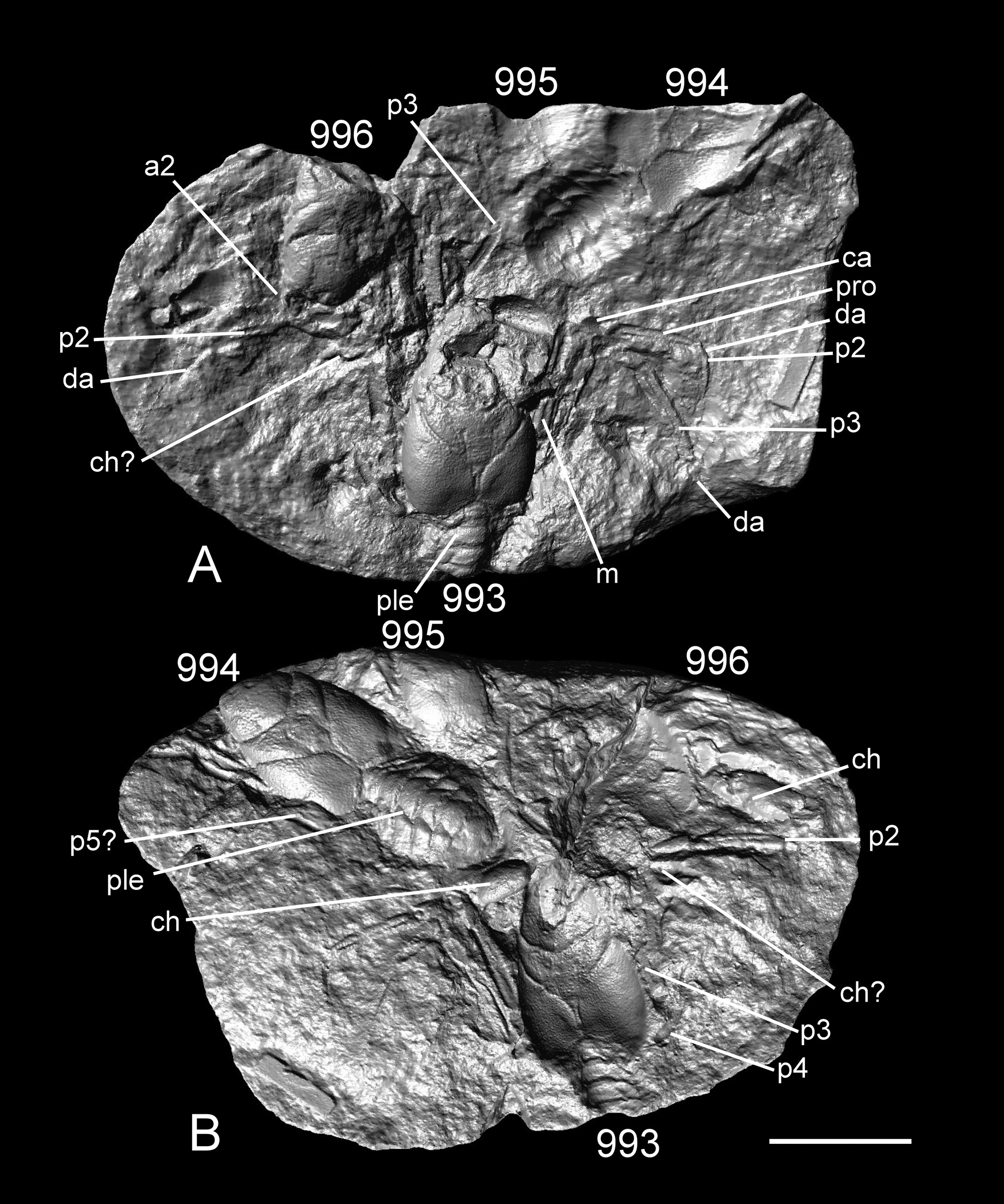
Additional paratype specimen

Eocarcinus praecursor is a Jurassic species of decapod crustacean, sufficiently distinct from its relatives to be placed in its own family (Eocarcinidae). Often considered the oldest true crab, it was considered by a 2010 study to be an early member of the Anomura. However, a reanalysis in 2020 again found it to be the earliest known stem-group crab.

== Distribution ==
It lived during the early Pliensbachian age (Lower Jurassic), and has been found in rocks at two sites in the United Kingdom – Mickelton Tunnel (near Aston Magna), Gloucestershire and Runswick Bay, Yorkshire.

== Description ==
In many of its characters, it represents a transitional stage between the Glypheoidea and the Middle Jurassic crabs in the Prosopidae. Since its ancestors were long-tailed decapods, and its successors were short-tailed crabs, Eocarcinus has been described as "the lobster who decided to become a crab". Previously considered to be the oldest known true crab, a 2010 revision concluded that Eocarcinus could not be accommodated among the Brachyura, and was instead transferred to the Anomura. However, a 2020 reanalysis found that it was again the earliest known stem-group crab, but that it had not undergone the process of carcinisation.
