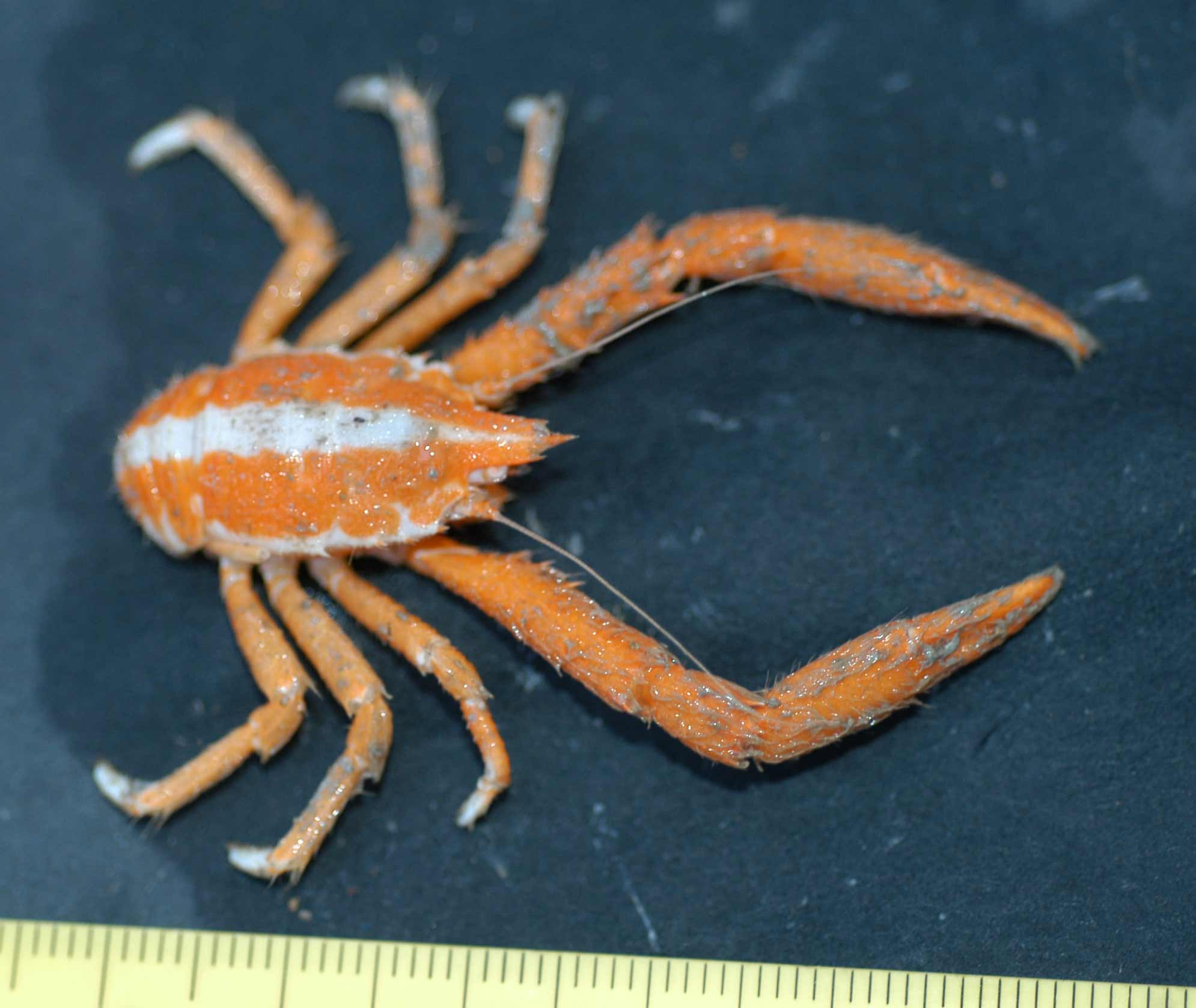
- Munidopsis serricornis

Scientific classification
- Domain: Eukaryota
- Kingdom: Animalia
- Phylum: Arthropoda
- Class: Malacostraca
- Order: Decapoda
- Suborder: Pleocyemata
- Infraorder: Anomura
- Superfamily: Galatheoidea
- Family: Munidopsidae; Ortmann, 1898

= Munidopsidae =

Family of crustaceans

Munidopsidae is a family of crustaceans belonging to the order Decapoda. The Munidopsids are the deepest-dwelling family of superfamily Galatheoidea, which comprises families Galatheidae, Munididae, Munidopsidae, and Porcellanidae.

Munidopsids are one of the most common types of decapod found in abyssal zones, and have been found occupying active hydrothermal vents and cold seeps. Munidopsids reside from slope to abyssal floor, save for the species M. polymorpha, which can be found in submarine caves as shallow as 2 meters below sea level. They are commonly referred to as squat lobsters.

As of 2008, 224 species of Munidopsids have been catalogued: 71 in the Atlantic, 132 in the Pacific, and 50 in the Indian Ocean.

== Genera ==
Genera:

- Galacantha A. Milne-Edwards, 1880
- Janetogalathea Baba & Wicksten, 1997
- Leiogalathea Baba, 1969
- Munidopsis Whiteaves, 1874
- Shinkaia Baba & Williams, 1998
