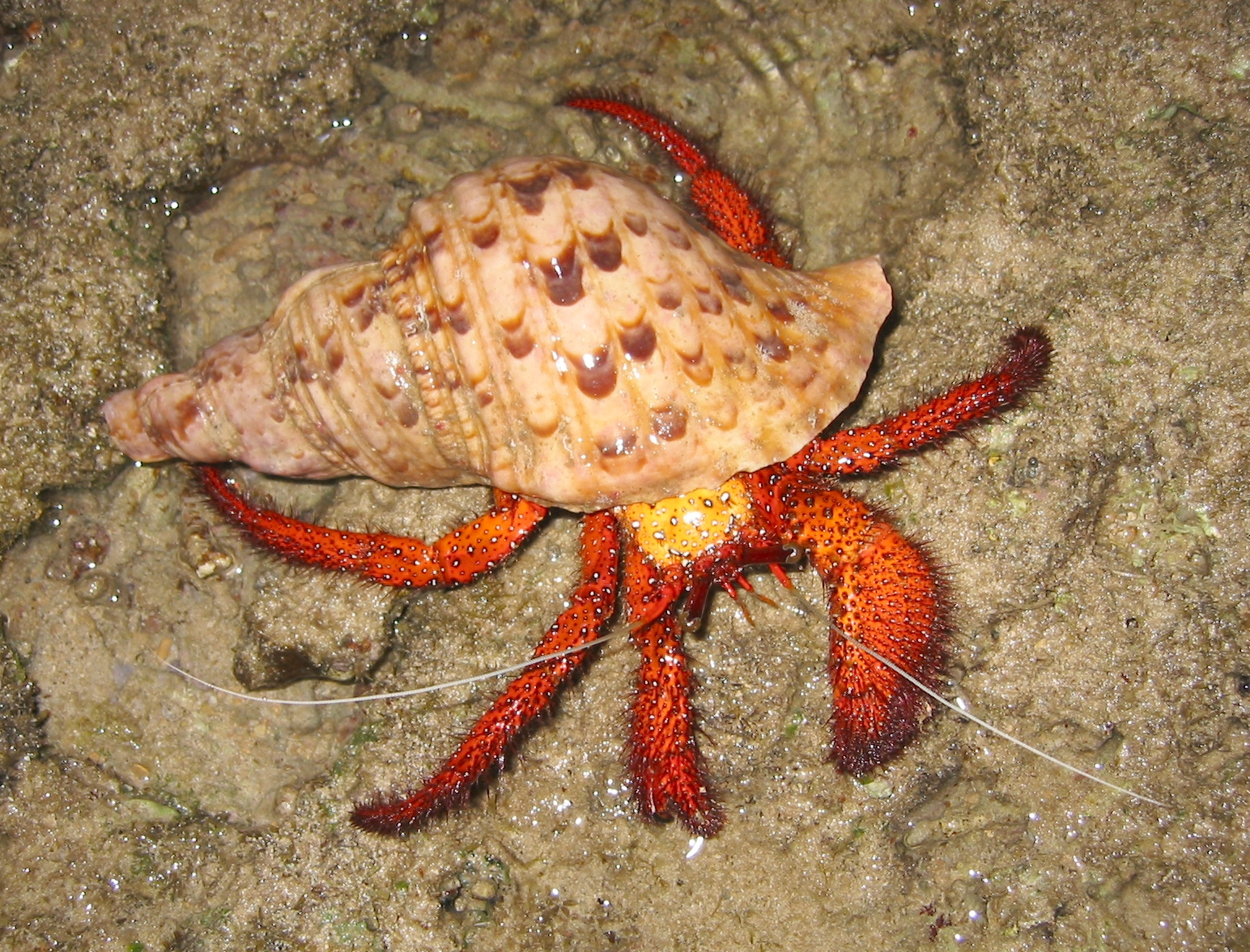
- The hermit crab Dardanus megistos

Scientific classification
- Kingdom: Animalia
- Phylum: Arthropoda
- Clade: Pancrustacea
- Class: Malacostraca
- Order: Decapoda
- Suborder: Pleocyemata
- Clade: Reptantia
- Infraorder: Anomura; Macleay, 1838

Superfamilies
- Aegloidea; Chirostyloidea; † Eocarcinoidea; Galatheoidea; Hippoidea; Lomisoidea; Paguroidea

= Anomura =

Anomura Temporal range: Late Triassic: Norian - Recent, 227–0 Ma

Infraorder of crustaceans

Anomura (sometimes Anomala) is a group of decapod crustaceans, including hermit crabs and others. Several groups such as the king crabs and porcelain crabs within the Anomura have independently undergone carcinisation, acquiring the armoured crab body plan with a concealed tail. It is the sister group to the "true crabs" or Brachyura.

== Description ==
The name Anomura derives from an old classification in which reptant decapods were divided into Macrura (long-tailed), Brachyura (short-tailed) and Anomura (differently-tailed). The alternative name Anomala reflects the unusual variety of forms in this group; whereas all crabs share some obvious similarities, the various groups of anomurans are quite dissimilar.

The group has been moulded by several instances of carcinisation – the development of a crab-like body form. Thus, the king crabs (Lithodidae), porcelain crabs (Porcellanidae) and hairy stone crab (Lomisidae) are all separate instances of carcinisation.

As decapods (meaning ten-legged), anomurans have ten pereiopods, but the last pair of these is reduced in size, and often hidden inside the gill chamber (under the carapace) to be used for cleaning the gills. Since this arrangement is very rare in true crabs (for example, the small family Hexapodidae), a "crab" with only eight visible pereiopods is generally an anomuran.

== Evolution ==
The infraorder Anomura belongs to the group Reptantia, which consists of the walking/crawling decapods (lobsters and crabs). There is wide acceptance from morphological and molecular data that Anomura and Brachyura ("true" crabs) are sister taxa, together making up the clade Meiura. Anomura likely diverged from Brachyura in the Late Triassic period, with the earliest discovered Anomuran fossil Platykotta akaina dating from the Norian–Rhaetian aged Ghalilah Formation of the United Arab Emirates.

The cladogram below shows Anomura's placement within the larger order Decapoda, from analysis by Wolfe et al. (2019).

- Decapoda
  - - Dendrobranchiata (prawns)
  - Pleocyemata
    - - Stenopodidea (boxer shrimp)
      - - Procarididea
        - Caridea ("true" shrimp)
    - Reptantia (crawling / walking decapods)
      - - Achelata (spiny lobsters and slipper lobsters)
        - - Polychelida (benthic crustaceans)
          - Glypheidea (glypheoid lobsters)
          - Astacidea (lobsters and crayfish)
      - - Axiidea (mud shrimp, ghost shrimp, and burrowing shrimp)
        - - Gebiidea (mud lobsters and mud shrimp)
          - - Anomura (hermit crabs and allies)
            - Brachyura ("true" crabs)

Some of the internal relationships within Anomura are shown in the 2026 cladogram found below.

- Brachyura ("true" crabs)
- Anomura
  - Galatheoidea
    - Porcellanidae (porcelain crabs)
    - - Munidopsidae (squat lobsters)
      - - Galatheidae (squat lobsters)
        - Munididae (squat lobsters)
  - - - - Pagurus longicarpus
        - - Lithodidae (king crabs)
          - Paguridae
      - - Pylochelidae (symetrical hermit crabs)
        - - Lomisidae (hairy stone crabs)
          - - Aeglidae (pancoras)
            - Chirostyloidea
              - Kiwaidae (yeti crabs)
              - Sternostylidae
    - - Hippoidea
        - Blepharipodidae (mole crabs)
        - - Albuneidae (mole crabs)
          - Hippidae (mole crabs)
      - Paguroidea
        - Diogenidae (left-handed hermit crabs)
        - Coenobitidae (terrestrial hermit crabs)

== Classification ==
The infraorder Anomura contained seven extant superfamilies:

| Superfamily | Members | Families | Photo |
|---|---|---|---|
| Aegloidea | pancoras | Aeglidae | Aegla sp. |
| Chirostyloidea | squat lobsters | Chirostylidae; Eumunididae; Kiwaidae Sternostylidae | Eumunida picta |
| † Eocarcinoidea | † Eocarcinus † Platykotta | † Eocarcinidae † Platykottidae | |
| Galatheoidea | squat lobsters porcelain crabs | Galatheidae; Munididae; Munidopsidae; Porcellanidae † Retrorsichelidae | Munidopsis serricornis (Munidopsidae) |
| Hippoidea | mole crabs | Albuneidae; Blepharipodidae; Hippidae | Blepharipoda occidentalis (Blepharipodidae) |
| Lomisoidea | hairy stone crab | Lomisidae | Lomis hirta |
| Paguroidea | hermit crabs coconut crab | Coenobitidae; Diogenidae; Lithodidae; Paguridae; Parapaguridae; Probeebeidae; Pylochelidae; Pylojacquesidae; Xylopaguridae | Coenobita clypeatus (Coenobitidae) |

The oldest fossil attributed to Anomura is Platykotta, from the Norian–Rhaetian (Late Triassic) Period in the United Arab Emirates.
