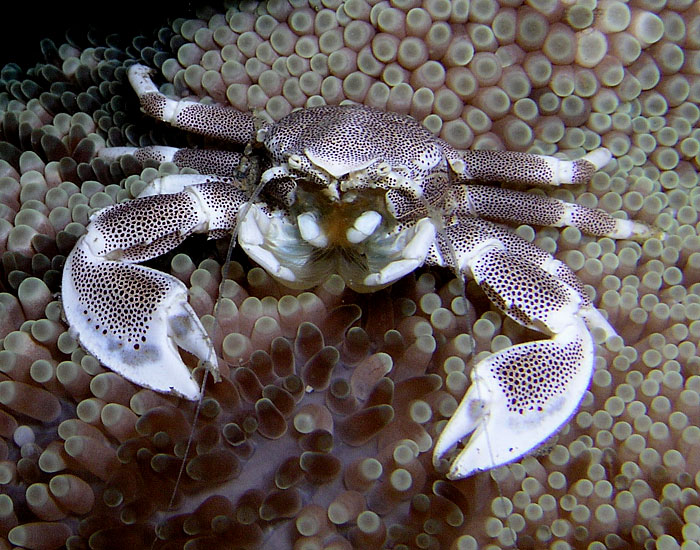
- Neopetrolisthes maculatus (Porcellanidae)
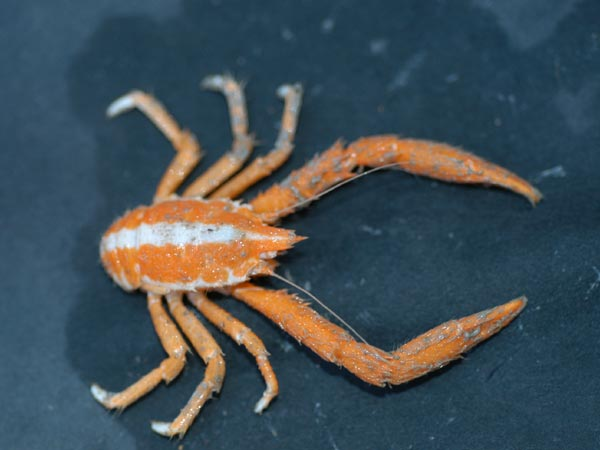
- Munidopsis tridentata (Munidopsidae)

Scientific classification
- Kingdom: Animalia
- Phylum: Arthropoda
- Clade: Pancrustacea
- Class: Malacostraca
- Order: Decapoda
- Suborder: Pleocyemata
- Infraorder: Anomura
- Superfamily: Galatheoidea; Samouelle, 1819

Families
- Galatheidae; Munididae; Munidopsidae; Porcellanidae; † Paragalatheidae; † Catillogalatheidae

= Galatheoidea =

Galatheoidea Temporal range: Middle Jurassic–recent

Superfamily of crustaceans

The Galatheoidea are a superfamily of decapod crustaceans comprising the porcelain crabs and some squat lobsters. Squat lobsters within the three families of the superfamily Chirostyloidea are not closely related to the squat lobsters within the Galatheoidea. The fossil record of the superfamily extends back to the Middle Jurassic genus Palaeomunidopsis.

== Classification ==
These families and genera are included:

Galatheidae Samouelle, 1819

- † Acanthogalathea Müller & Collins, 1991 – Upper Eocene
- Alainius Baba, 1991
- Allogalathea Baba, 1969
- Allomunida Baba, 1988
- Coralliogalathea Baba & Javed, 1974
- Fennerogalathea Baba, 1988
- Galathea Fabricius, 1793
- Janetogalathea Baba & Wicksten, 1997
- Lauriea Baba, 1971
- † Lessinigalathea De Angeli & Garassino, 2002 – Lower Eocene
- † Lophoraninella Glaessner, 1945 – Upper Cretaceous
- † Luisogalathea Karasawa & Hayakawa, 2000 – Upper Cretaceous
- Macrothea Macpherson & Cleva, 2010
- † Mesogalathea Houša, 1963 – Upper Jurassic to Cretaceous
- Nanogalathea Tirmizi & Javed, 1980
- † Palaeomunida Lőrenthey, 1901 – Upper Jurassic to Oligocene
- Phylladiorhynchus Baba, 1969
- † Spathagalathea De Angeli & Garassino, 2002 – Upper Eocene

Munididae Ahyong et al., 2010

- Agononida Baba & de Saint Laurent, 1996
- Anomoeomunida Baba, 1993
- Anoplonida Baba & de Saint Laurent, 1996
- Babamunida Cabezas, Macpherson & Machordom, 2008
- Bathymunida Balss, 1914
- Cervimunida Benedict, 1902
- † Cretagalathea Garassino, De Angeli & Pasini, 2008 – Upper Cretaceous
- Crosnierita Macpherson, 1998
- Enriquea Baba, 2005
- Heteronida Baba & de Saint Laurent, 1996
- Sadayoshia Baba, 1969
- Munida Leach, 1820
- Neonida Baba & de Saint Laurent, 1996
- Onconida Baba & de Saint Laurent, 1996
- Paramunida Baba, 1988
- Pleuroncodes Stimpson, 1860
- Plesionida Baba & de Saint Laurent, 1996
- † Protomunida Beurlen, 1930 – Paleocene to Eocene
- Raymunida Macpherson & Machordom, 2000
- Setanida Macpherson, 2006
- Tasmanida Ahyong, 2007
- Torbenella Baba, 2008

Munidopsidae Ortmann, 1898

- † Brazilomunida Martins-Neto, 2001 – Upper Cretaceous
- † Calteagalathea De Angeli & Garassino, 2006 – Upper Cretaceous
- † Eomunidopsis Vía Boada, 1981 – Upper Jurassic to Upper Cretaceous
- † Faxegalathea Jakobsen & Collins, 1997 – Lower Paleocene
- Galacantha A. Milne-Edwards, 1880
- † Gastrosacus von Meyer, 1851 – Upper Jurassic to Cretaceous
- Leiogalathea Baba, 1969
- Munidopsis Whiteaves, 1874
- † Munitheities Lőrentheyin Lőrenthey& Beurlen, 1929 – Upper Jurassic
- † Palaeomunidopsis Van Straelen, 1925 – Middle Jurassic
- † Paragalathea Patrulius, 1960 – Upper Jurassic to Cretaceous
- Shinkaia Baba & Williams, 1998

Porcellanidae Haworth, 1825

- Aliaporcellana Nakasone & Miyake, 1969
- Allopetrolisthes Haig, 1960
- Ancylocheles Haig, 1978
- † Annieporcellana Fraaije, Van Bakel, Jagt & Artal, 2008
- † Beripetrolisthes De Angeli & Garassino, 2002
- Capilliporcellana Haig, 1978
- Clastotoechus Haig, 1960
- Enosteoides Johnson, 1970
- † Eopetrolisthes De Angeli & Garassino, 2002
- Euceramus Stimpson, 1860
- Eulenaios Ng & Nakasone, 1993
- Heteropolyonyx Osawa, 2001
- Heteroporcellana Haig, 1978
- Liopetrolisthes Haig, 1960
- Lissoporcellana Haig, 1978
- † Lobipetrolisthes De Angeli & Garassino, 2002
- † Longoporcellana Müller & Collins, 1991
- Madarateuchus Harvey, 1999
- Megalobrachium Stimpson, 1858
- Minyocerus Stimpson, 1858
- Neopetrolisthes Miyake, 1937
- Neopisosoma Haig, 1960
- Novorostrum Osawa, 1998
- Orthochela Glassell, 1936
- Pachycheles Stimpson, 1858
- Parapetrolisthes Haig, 1962
- Petrocheles Miers, 1876
- Petrolisthes Stimpson, 1858
- Pisidia Leach, 1820
- Polyonyx Stimpson, 1858
- Porcellana Lamarck, 1801
- Porcellanella White, 1852
- † Porcellanoidea C.-H. Hu & Tao, 1996
- Pseudoporcellanella Sankarankutty, 1961
- Raphidopus Stimpson, 1858
- Ulloaia Glassell, 1938
- † Vibrissalana Robins & Klompmaker, 2019

== Fossil record ==
Two further fossil taxa may be included in the superfamily, but were not considered in the latest synopsis. The family Retrorsichelidae contains the single species, Retrorsichela laevis from the Campanian, which was tentatively placed in Galatheoidea by its authors. The Eocene genus Ovocarcinus, containing only O. elongatus, was originally placed incertae sedis.

== See also ==
- Chirostyloidea, the other superfamily of squat lobsters
