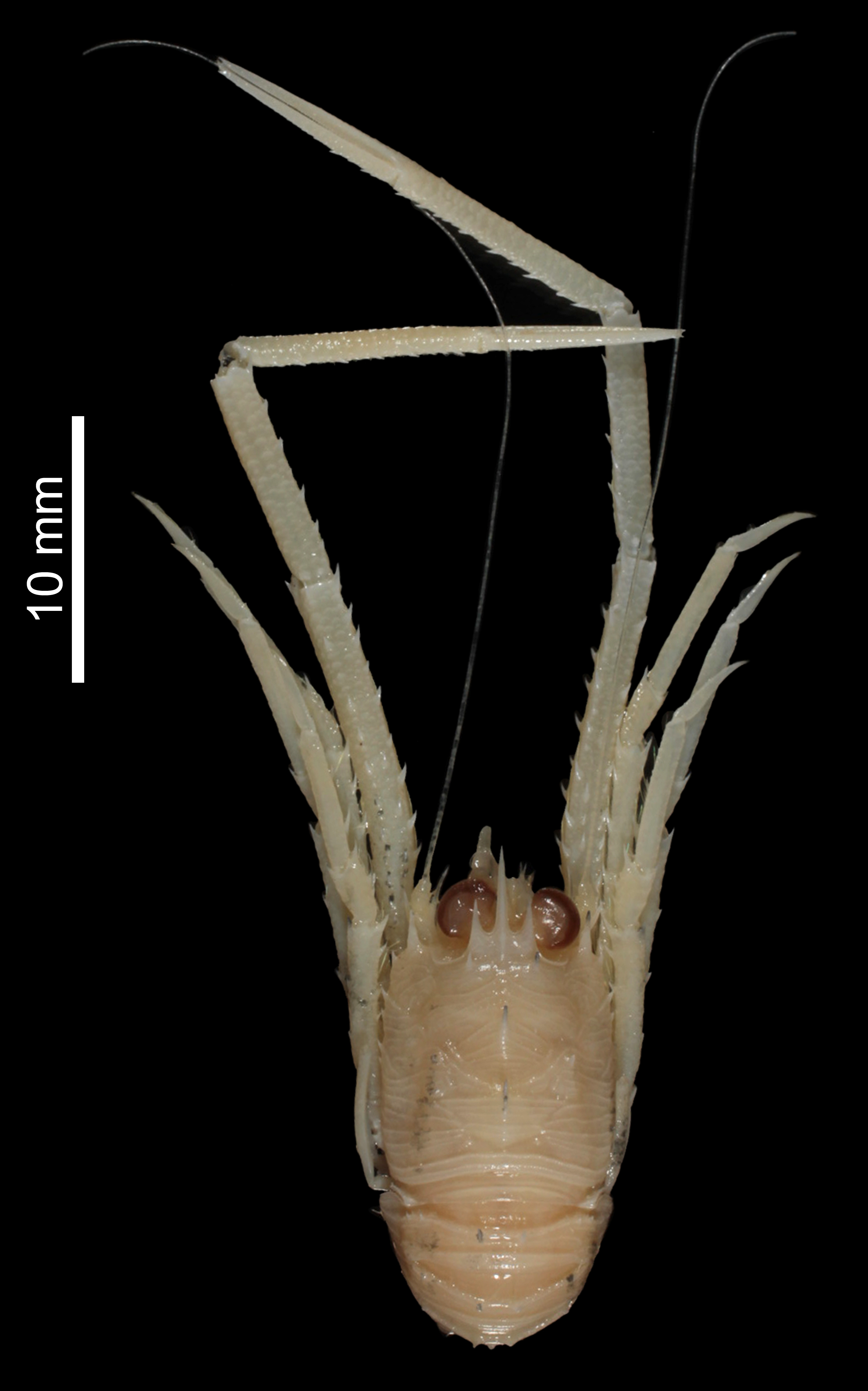

Scientific classification
- Kingdom: Animalia
- Phylum: Arthropoda
- Class: Malacostraca
- Order: Decapoda
- Suborder: Pleocyemata
- Infraorder: Anomura
- Family: Munididae
- Genus: Crosnierita
- Species: C. dicata

Binomial name
- Crosnierita dicata Macpherson, 1998

= Crosnierita dicata =

Species of crustacean

Crosnierita dicata is a species of squat lobster in the family Munididae. It is found off the Loyalty Islands and Vanuatu, at depths between approximately 285 and 440 metres (935 and 1,444 ft).
