= Crosnierita adela =

Scientific classification
- Domain: Eukaryota
- Kingdom: Animalia
- Phylum: Arthropoda
- Class: Malacostraca
- Order: Decapoda
- Suborder: Pleocyemata
- Infraorder: Anomura
- Family: Munididae
- Genus: Crosnierita
- Species: C. adela

Binomial name
- Crosnierita adela Ahyong, Taylor & McCallum, 2013

Species of crustacean

Crosnierita adela is a species of squat lobster in the family Munididae.
