= Raymunida erythrina =

Scientific classification
- Kingdom: Animalia
- Phylum: Arthropoda
- Class: Malacostraca
- Order: Decapoda
- Suborder: Pleocyemata
- Infraorder: Anomura
- Family: Munididae
- Genus: Raymunida
- Species: R. erythrina

Binomial name
- Raymunida erythrina Macpherson & Machordom, 2001

Species of crustacean

Raymunida erythrina is a species of squat lobster in the family Munididae from the Pacific and Indian oceans. The species can be distinguished by its morphological characters (subtle morphological characters, such as length of the mesial spine on the basal antennal segment, the length of its walking legs, and color pattern) and its mitochondrial cytochrome c oxidase subunit I sequences.
