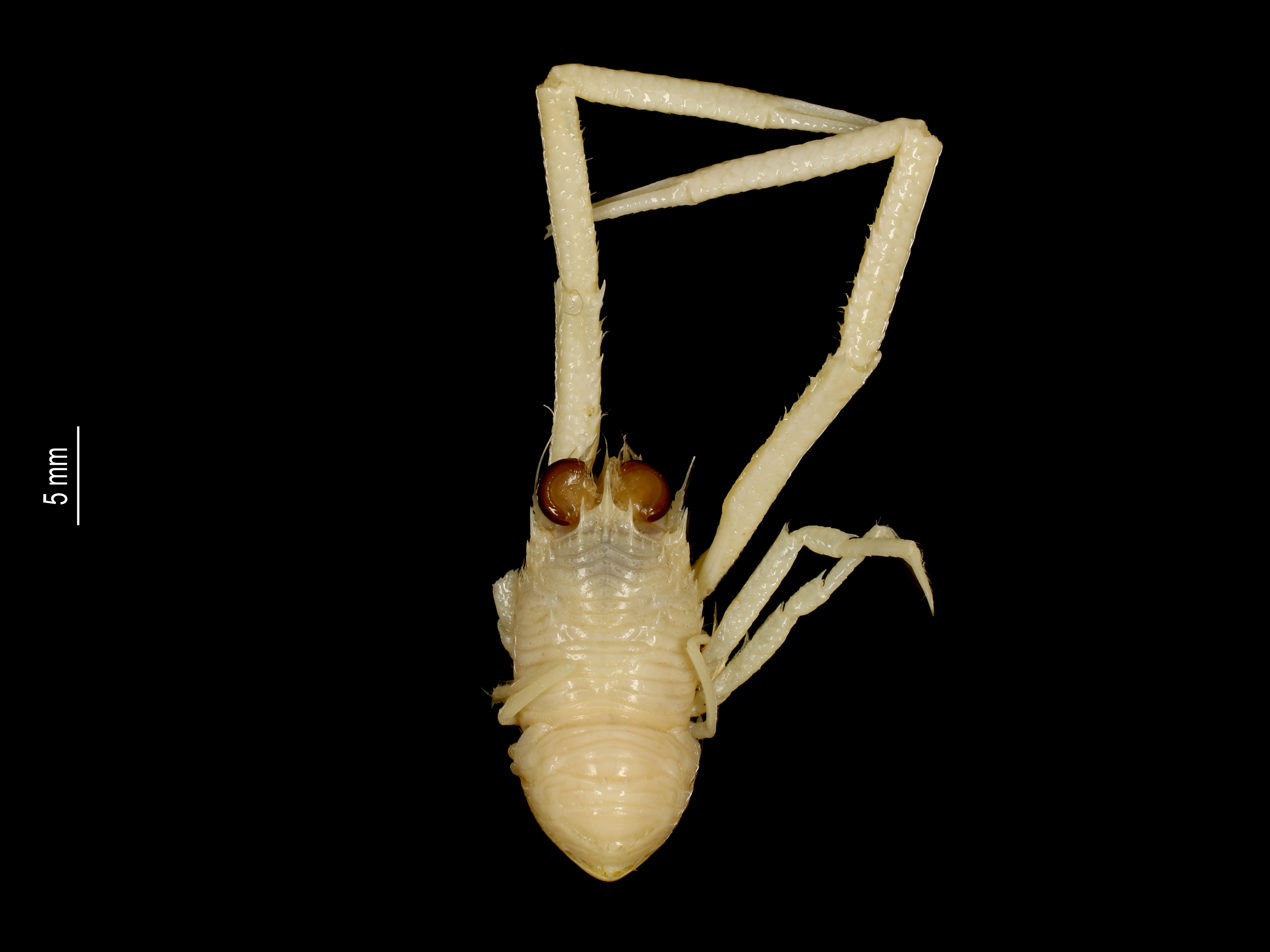
- Preserved specimen of Torbenella orbis

Scientific classification
- Kingdom: Animalia
- Phylum: Arthropoda
- Clade: Pancrustacea
- Class: Malacostraca
- Order: Decapoda
- Suborder: Pleocyemata
- Infraorder: Anomura
- Family: Munididae
- Genus: Torbenella
- Species: T. orbis

Binomial name
- Torbenella orbis (Baba, 2005)

Synonyms
- Torbenia orbis Baba, 2005

= Torbenella orbis =

Species of crustacean

Torbenella orbis is a species of squat lobsters in the family Munididae. It occurs in the Pacific Ocean from near the Kei Islands to the Norfolk Islands.
