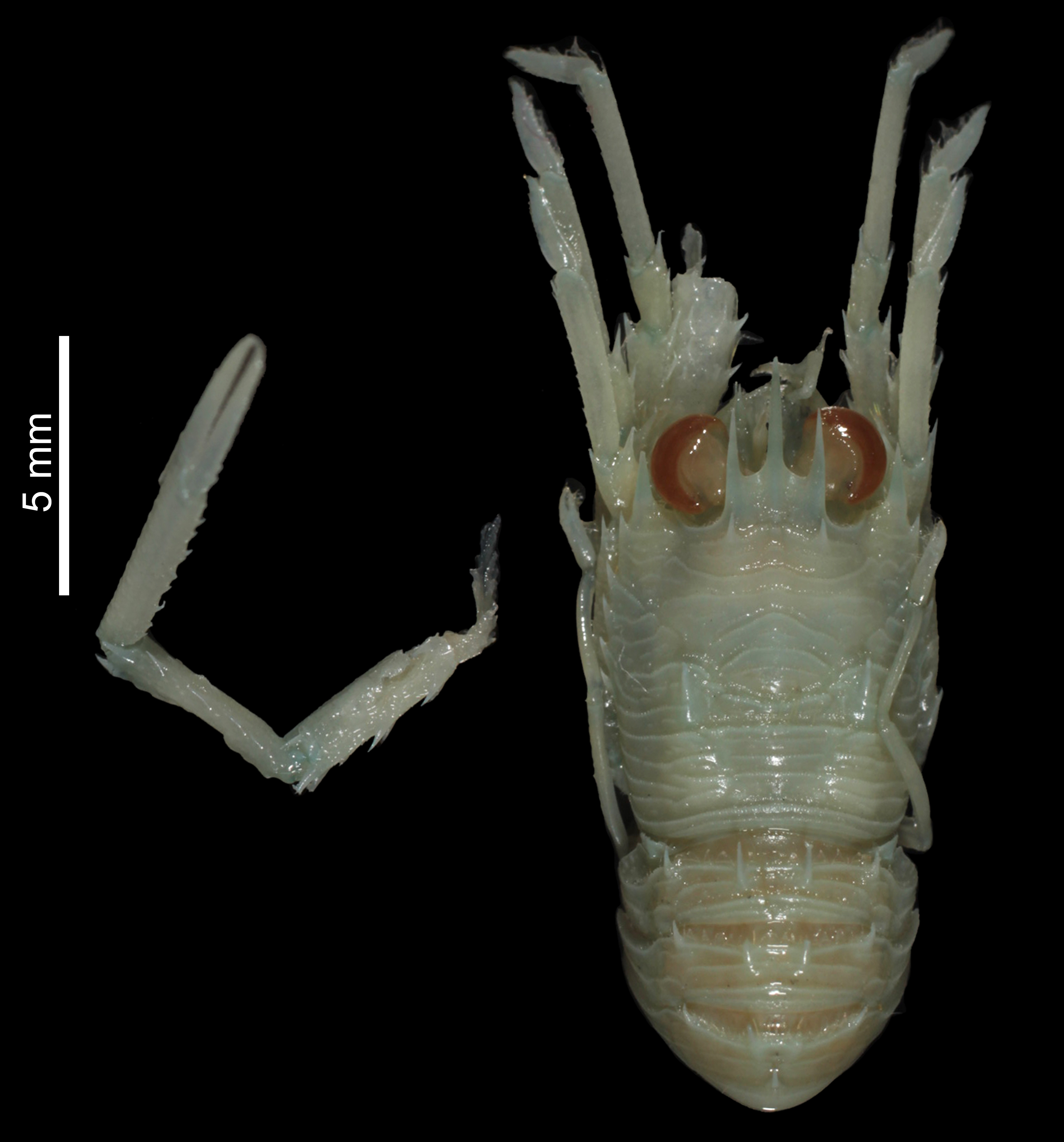

Scientific classification
- Kingdom: Animalia
- Phylum: Arthropoda
- Class: Malacostraca
- Order: Decapoda
- Suborder: Pleocyemata
- Infraorder: Anomura
- Family: Munididae
- Genus: Crosnierita
- Species: C. yante

Binomial name
- Crosnierita yante (Macpherson, 1994)

= Crosnierita yante =

Species of crustacean

Crosnierita yante is a species of squat lobster in the family Munididae. It is found off of New Caledonia, at depths of about 400 metres (1,300 ft).
