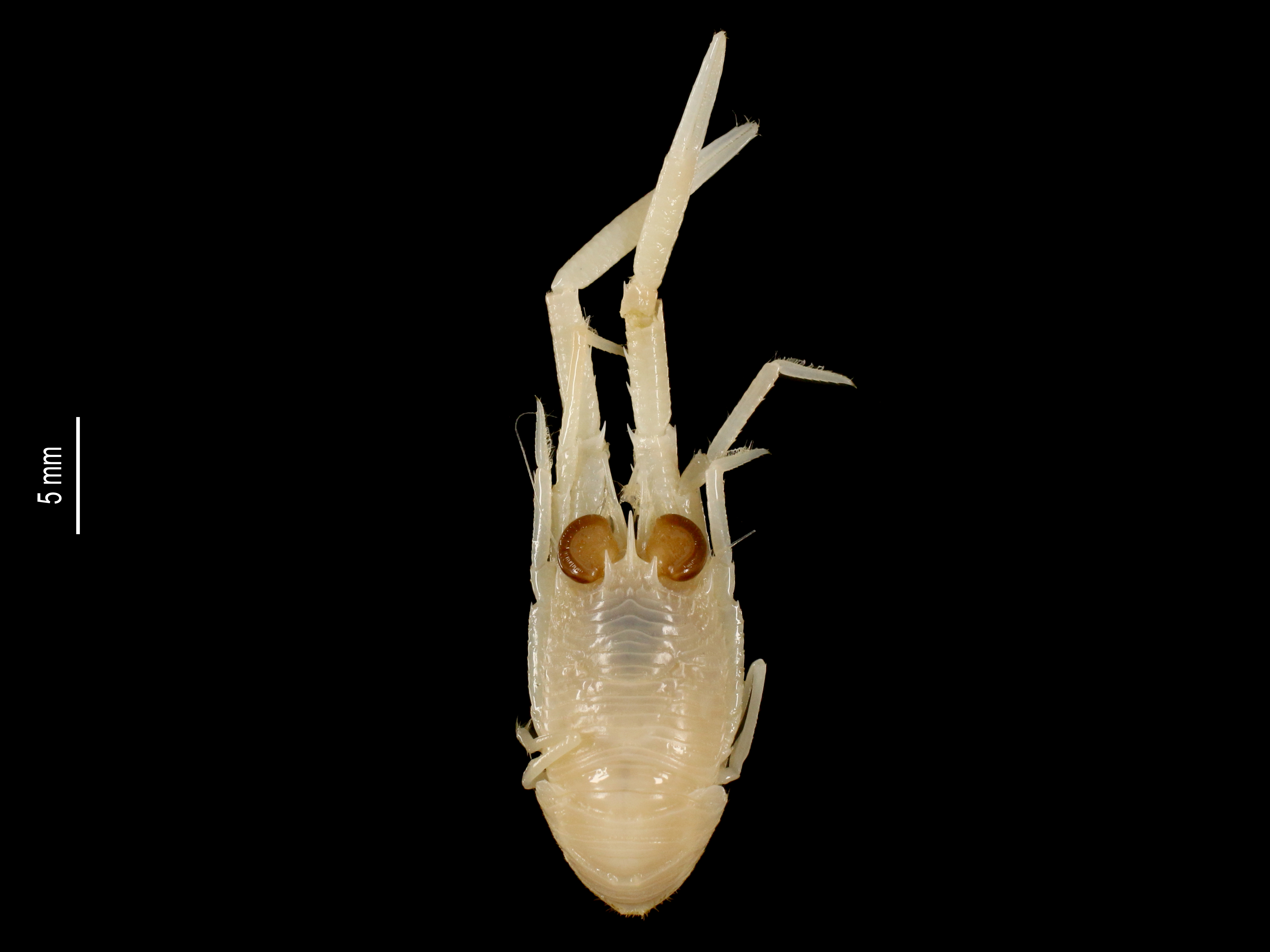

Scientific classification
- Kingdom: Animalia
- Phylum: Arthropoda
- Class: Malacostraca
- Order: Decapoda
- Suborder: Pleocyemata
- Infraorder: Anomura
- Family: Munididae
- Genus: Torbenella
- Species: T. insolita

Binomial name
- Torbenella insolita (Macpherson, 2004)

Synonyms
- Agononida insolita Macpherson, 2004; Torbenia insolita (Macpherson, 2004)

= Torbenella insolita =

Species of crustacean

Torbenella insolita is a species of squat lobsters in the family Munididae. It occurs in the Pacific Ocean from Tonga to Papua-New Guinea and New Caledonia at depths between 120–470 m (390–1,540 ft).

== Description ==
Males measure 5.8–9.5 mm (0.23–0.37 in) and females 4.1–8.1 mm (0.16–0.32 in) in postorbital carapace length. (Note: Measured from the base of the rostrum to the posterior margin of the carapace.) The body and the appendages are whitish. The carapace has some yellowish bands on the gastric area and on the posterior and lateral margins.
