= Juracrista perculta =

Juracrista perculta Temporal range: Jurassic

Scientific classification
- Domain: Eukaryota
- Kingdom: Animalia
- Phylum: Arthropoda
- Class: Malacostraca
- Order: Decapoda
- Suborder: Pleocyemata
- Infraorder: Anomura
- Family: Munididae
- Genus: †Juracrista
- Species: †J. perculta

Binomial name
- †Juracrista perculta Robins et al., 2012

Extinct species of crustacean

Juracrista perculta is an extinct species of squat lobster in the family Munididae. It was extant during the Jurassic Period.
