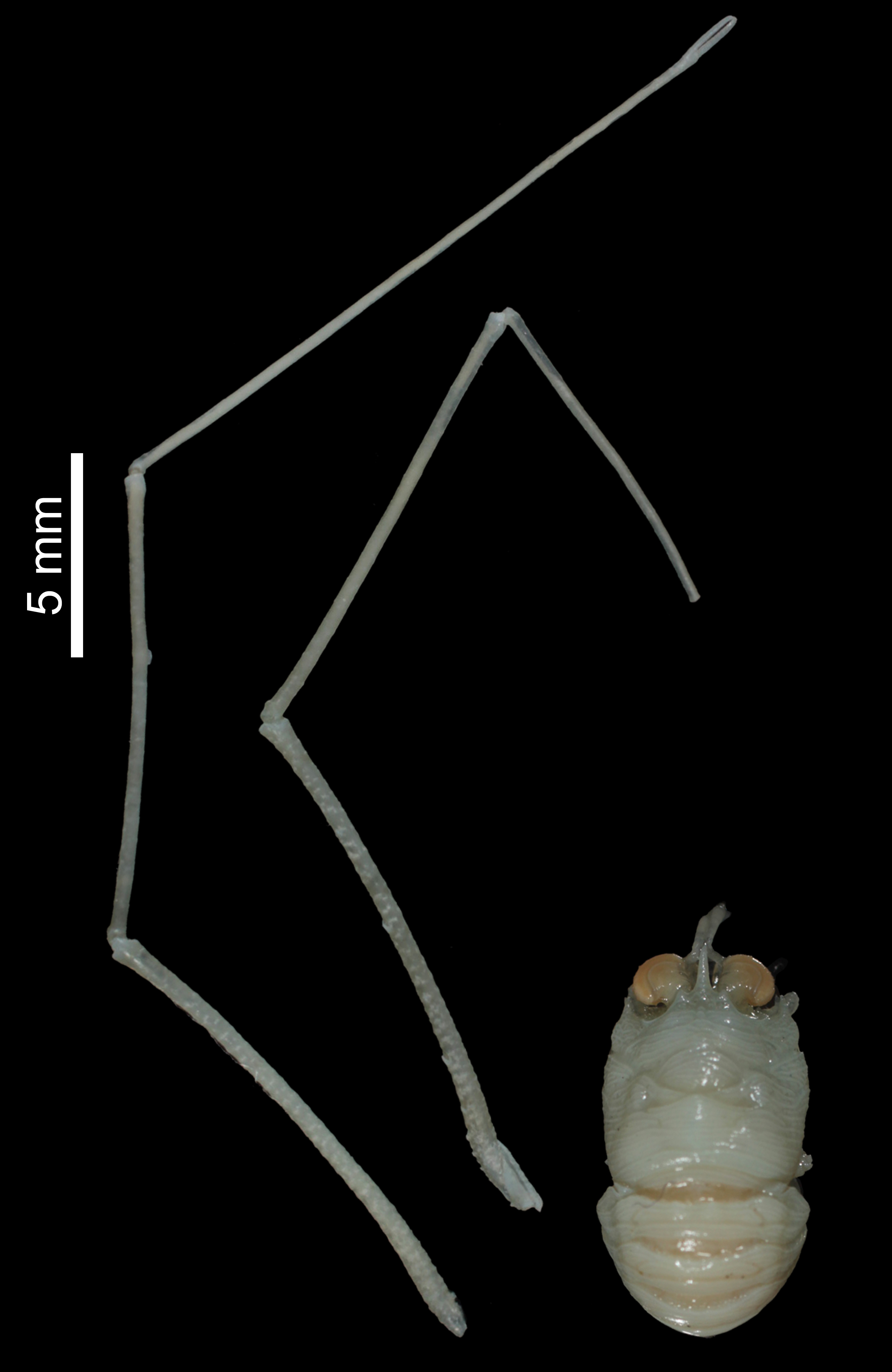
- PRESERVED_SPECIMEN; Anoplonida cracentis Baba & de Saint Laurent, 1996; Type status: HOLOTYPE; Identified by: Baba K. & de Saint Laurent M.; Individual Count: 1; Event date: 1976-03-22T11:10:00Z

Scientific classification
- Kingdom: Animalia
- Phylum: Arthropoda
- Clade: Pancrustacea
- Class: Malacostraca
- Order: Decapoda
- Suborder: Pleocyemata
- Infraorder: Anomura
- Family: Munididae
- Genus: Anoplonida
- Species: A. cracentis

Binomial name
- Anoplonida cracentis Baba & de Saint Laurent, 1996

= Anoplonida cracentis =

Species of crustacean

Anoplonida cracentis is a species of squat lobster in the family Munididae. The species name is derived from the Latin cracentis, meaning slender or graceful, in reference to its slender chelipeds. Both the males and the females measure about 4.3 millimetres (0.17 in). It is found off of the Philippines, at depths between about 190 and 195 metres (623 and 640 ft).
