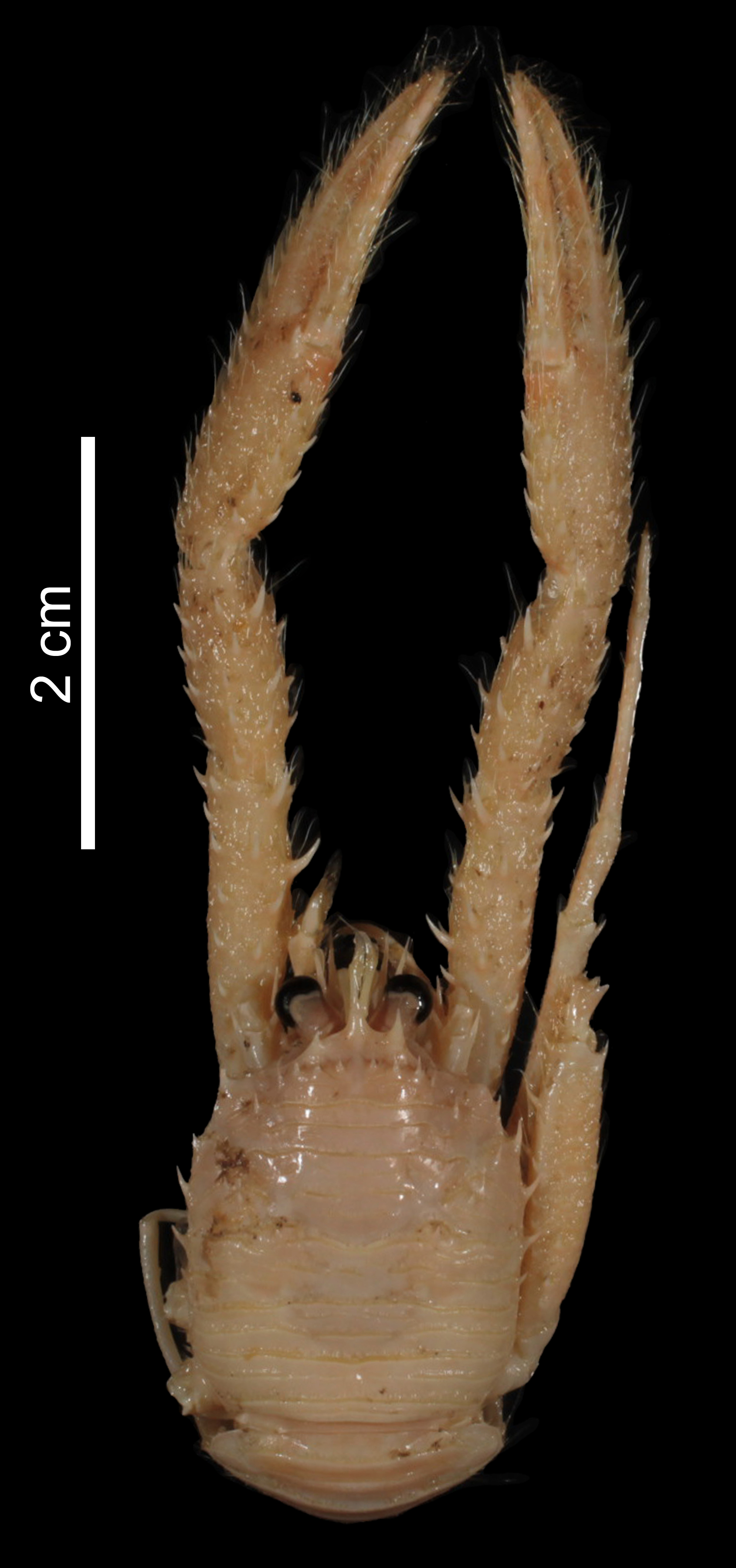

Scientific classification
- Kingdom: Animalia
- Phylum: Arthropoda
- Class: Malacostraca
- Order: Decapoda
- Suborder: Pleocyemata
- Infraorder: Anomura
- Family: Munididae
- Genus: Raymunida
- Species: R. insulata

Binomial name
- Raymunida insulata Macpherson & Machordom, 2001

= Raymunida insulata =

Species of crustacean

Raymunida insulata is a species of squat lobster in the family Munididae from the Pacific and Indian oceans. The species can be distinguished by its morphology (subtle morphological characteristics, such as length of the mesial spine on the basal antennal segment, the length of its walking legs, and color pattern) and its mitochondrial cytochrome c oxidase subunit I sequences.
