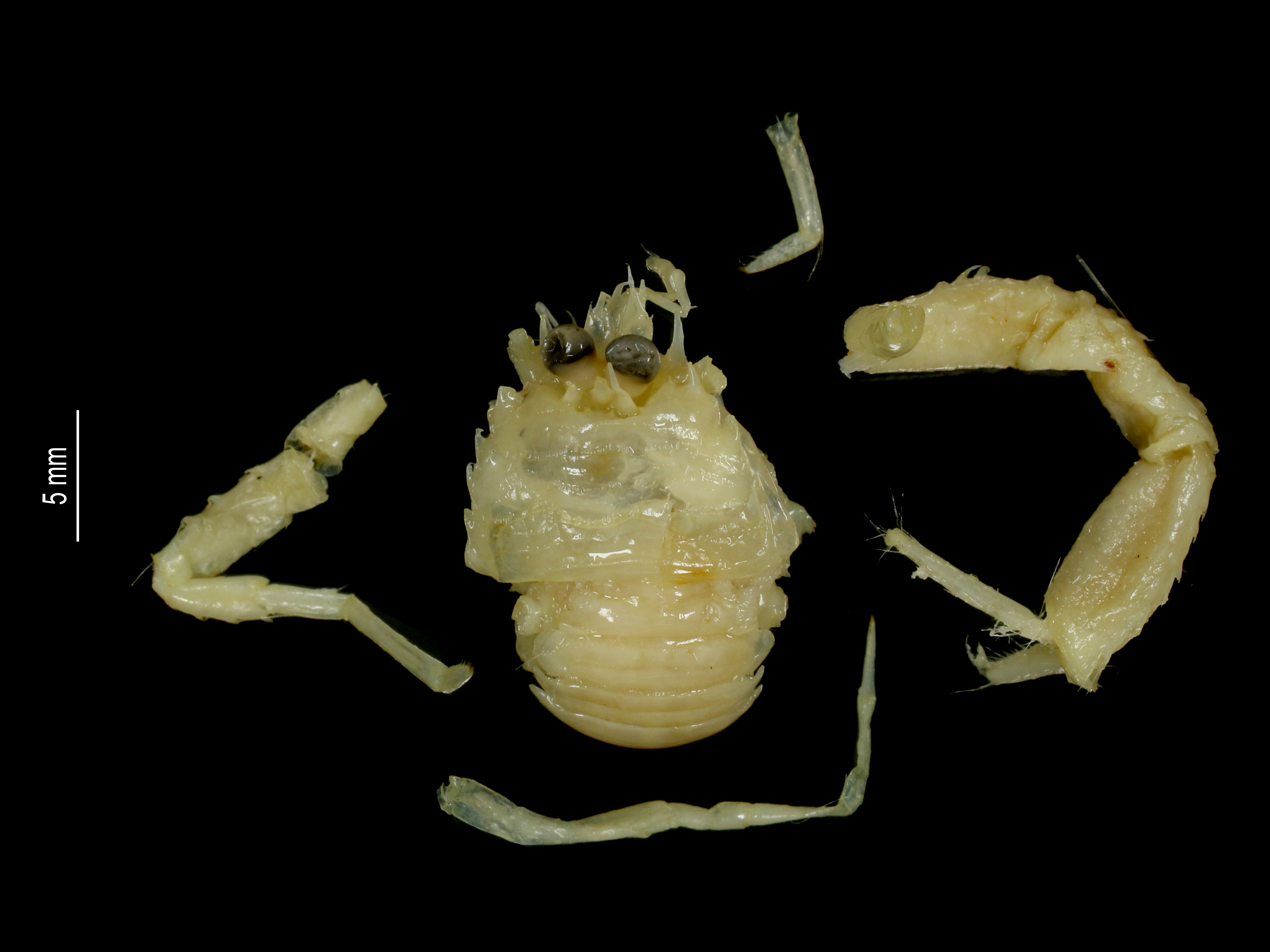

Scientific classification
- Kingdom: Animalia
- Phylum: Arthropoda
- Class: Malacostraca
- Order: Decapoda
- Suborder: Pleocyemata
- Infraorder: Anomura
- Family: Munididae
- Genus: Raymunida
- Species: R. confundens

Binomial name
- Raymunida confundens Macpherson & Machordom, 2001

= Raymunida confundens =

Species of crustacean

Raymunida confundens is a species of squat lobster in the family Munididae from the Pacific and Indian oceans. The species can be distinguished by its morphological characters (subtle morphological characters, such as length of the mesial spine on the basal antennal segment, the length of its walking legs, and color pattern) and its mitochondrial cytochrome c oxidase subunit I sequences.
