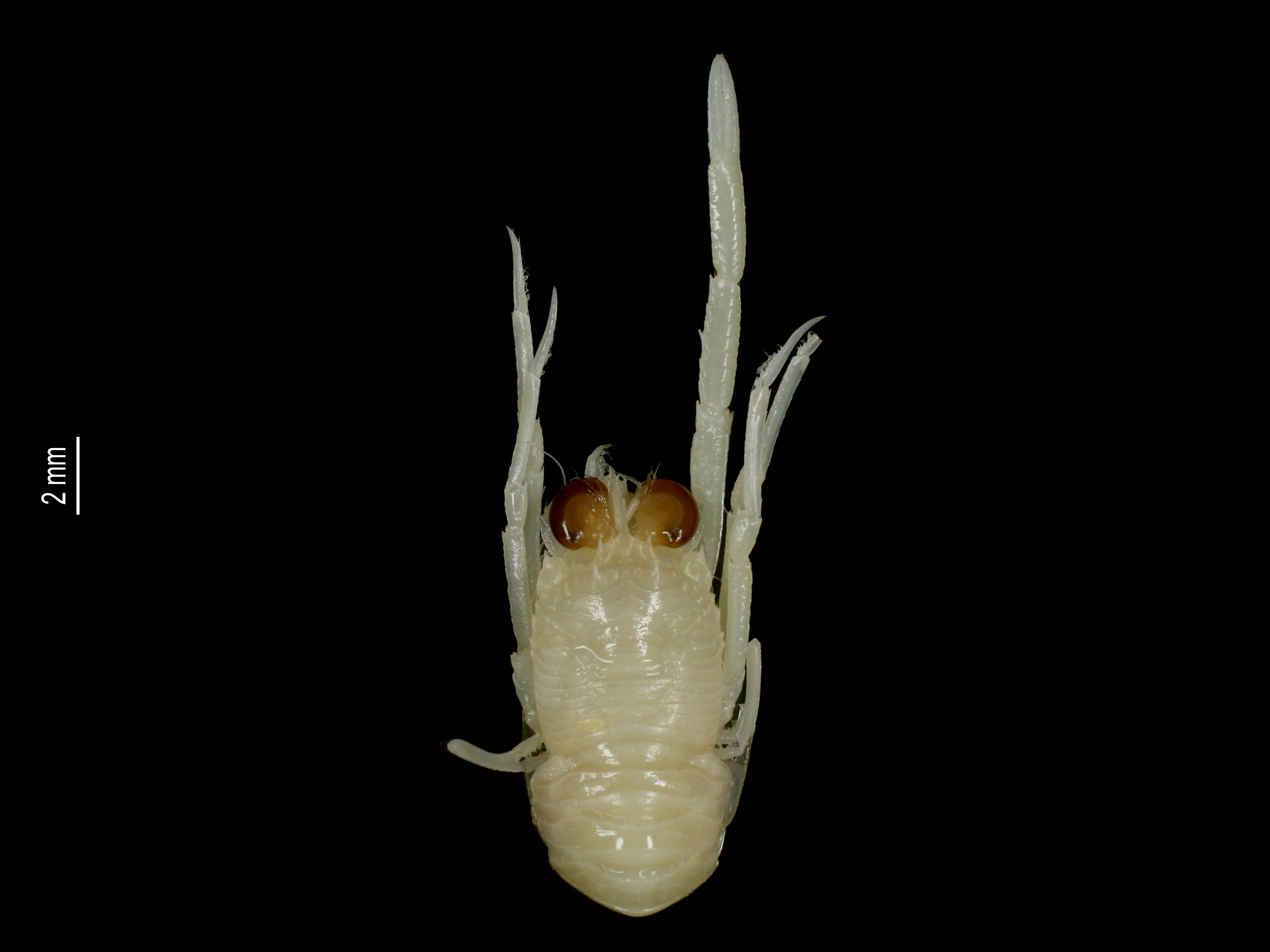

Scientific classification
- Kingdom: Animalia
- Phylum: Arthropoda
- Class: Malacostraca
- Order: Decapoda
- Suborder: Pleocyemata
- Infraorder: Anomura
- Family: Munididae
- Genus: Torbenella
- Species: T. calvata

Binomial name
- Torbenella calvata (Macpherson, 2006)

Synonyms
- Torbenia calvata Macpherson, 2006

= Torbenella calvata =

Species of crustacean

Torbenella calvata is a species of squat lobsters in the family Munididae. The species name, calvata, comes from the Latin word calvatus, meaning made bare. This is in reference to its lack of spines on the anterior ridge of the second abdominal segment.

== Taxonomy ==
This species was originally described as Torbenia calvata by Enrique Macpherson in 2006. It was later moved to the genus Torbenella in 2008 by Keiji Baba. The specific name is derived from the Latin calvatus, meaning made bear. This refers to the lack of spines on the anterior ridge of the second abdominal segment.

== Description ==
Torbenella calvata males usually measure around 4.3 millimetres (0.17 in) and the females around 4.5 millimetres (0.18 in). The anterolateral spine of the carapace does not reach the sinus that is between the rostrum and supraocular spines. The second abdominal segment is without spines. This distinguishes T. calvata from the other species of Torbenella. Both the anterior and posterior ridges of the second and third abdominal segments have a few short lateral striae behind them. The fourth abdominal somite does not have a median spine on the posterior ridge. The dactyli of the walking legs and the flexor margin have one to two moveable spinules.

== Distribution ==
This squat lobster can be found off of New Caledonia, at depths between 260 and 950 metres (850 and 3,120 ft). It resides in waters with a temperate ranging from about 5.3 to 18.0 °C (41.5 to 64.4 °F).
