= Anoplonida inermis =

Scientific classification
- Kingdom: Animalia
- Phylum: Arthropoda
- Clade: Pancrustacea
- Class: Malacostraca
- Order: Decapoda
- Suborder: Pleocyemata
- Infraorder: Anomura
- Family: Munididae
- Genus: Anoplonida
- Species: A. inermis

Binomial name
- Anoplonida inermis (Baba, 1994)

Species of crustacean

Anoplonida inermis is a species of squat lobster in the family Munididae. The species name is derived from the Latin inermis, meaning unarmed, in reference to the lack of spines on the upper side of the carapace. The males measure, on average, from 2.6 to 3.9 millimetres (0.10 to 0.15 in), with the females, on average, measuring from 2.7 to 5.3 millimetres (0.11 to 0.21 in). It is found off of the Solomon Islands, at depths between about 135 and 325 metres (443 and 1,066 ft), and off of both Central Queensland and New Caledonia, at depths ranging from about 295 to 400 metres (968 to 1,312 ft).
