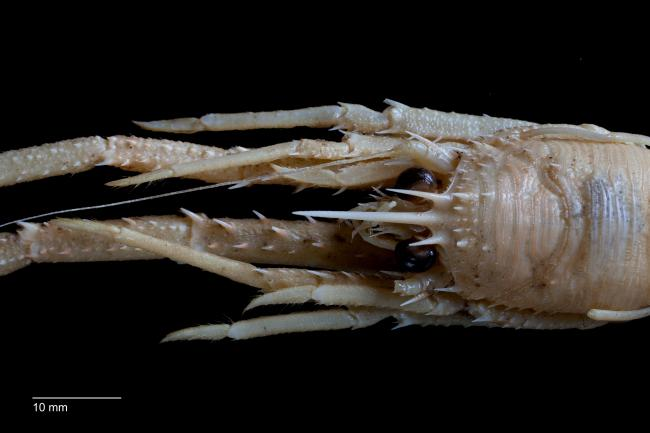

Scientific classification
- Kingdom: Animalia
- Phylum: Arthropoda
- Clade: Pancrustacea
- Class: Malacostraca
- Order: Decapoda
- Suborder: Pleocyemata
- Infraorder: Anomura
- Family: Munididae
- Genus: Scolonida
- Species: S. gracilis

Binomial name
- Scolonida gracilis (Henderson, 1885)

Synonyms
- Munida chydaea Ahyong & Gary Poore, 2004; Munida disgrega Baba, 2005; Munida gracilis Henderson, 1885

= Scolonida gracilis =

Species of crustacean

Scolonida gracilis is a species of squat lobster in the family Munididae.

The males measure between about 23.3 and 46.7 millimetres (0.9 and 1.8 in) and the females between about 12.4 and 36.0 millimetres (0.5 and 1.4 in). It is found off of Tasmania and Victoria to Sydney, and in the Great Australian Bight, at depths between about 145 and 700 metres (480 and 2,300 ft). It is also found in the waters around New Zealand.

In 2021, Munida chydaea was synonymised with Munida gracilis. The specific name chydaea was derived from the Greek χυδαῖος (khudaîos), "abundant", in reference to how numerous the species is.
