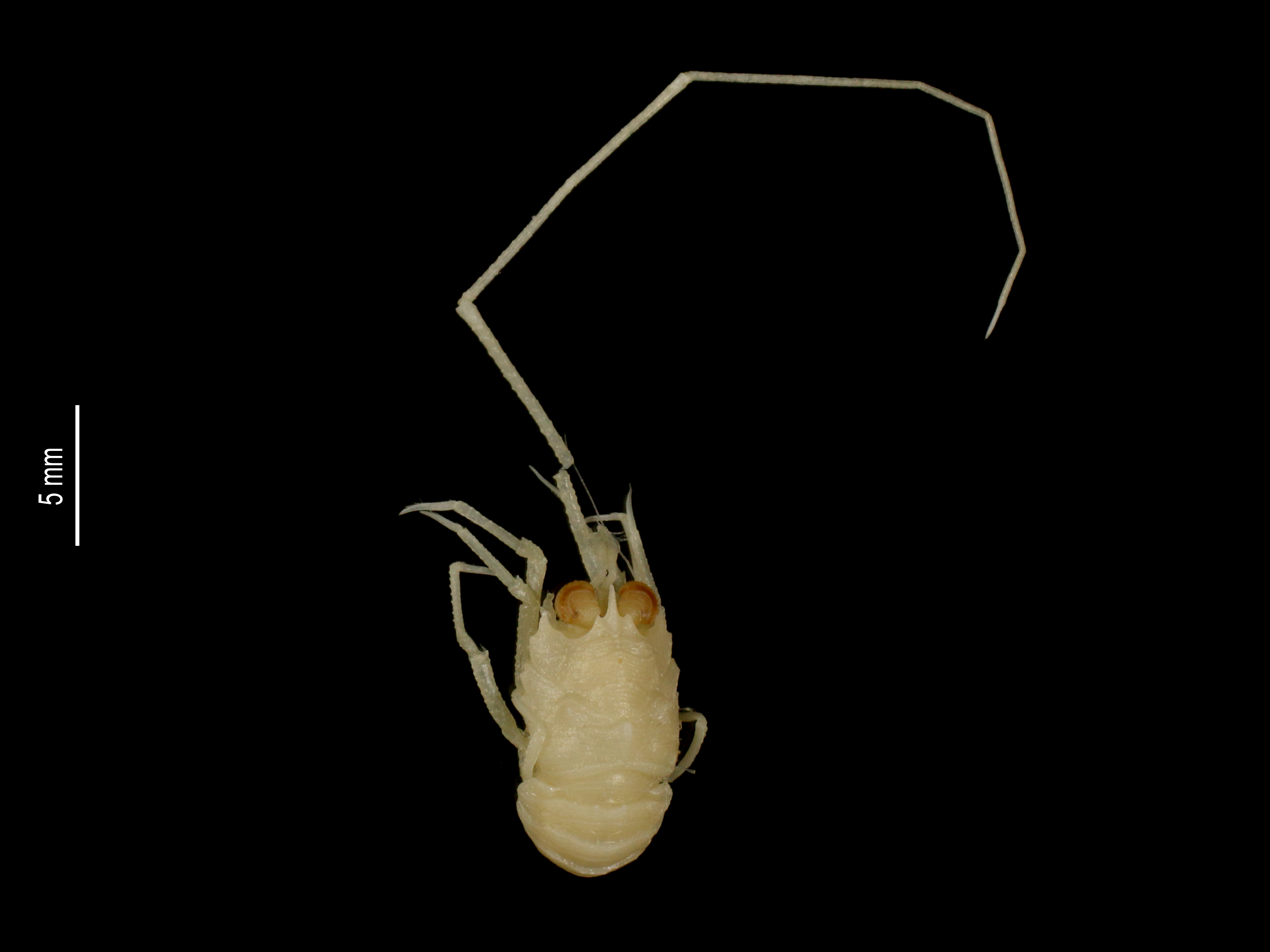
- PRESERVED_SPECIMEN; Anoplonida patae Macpherson & Baba, 2006; Type status: HOLOTYPE; Identified by: Macpherson & Baba; Individual Count: 1; Event date: 2000-06-11T00:00:00Z

Scientific classification
- Kingdom: Animalia
- Phylum: Arthropoda
- Clade: Pancrustacea
- Class: Malacostraca
- Order: Decapoda
- Suborder: Pleocyemata
- Infraorder: Anomura
- Family: Munididae
- Genus: Anoplonida
- Species: A. patae

Binomial name
- Anoplonida patae Macpherson & Baba, 2006

= Anoplonida patae =

Species of crustacean

Anoplonida patae is a species of squat lobster in the family Munididae. The species name is dedicated to Patsy A. McLaughlin, a crustacean systematist. The males measure, on average, 4.7 millimetres (0.19 in), and the females measure from about 4.3 to 5.4 millimetres (0.17 to 0.21 in). It is found off of Tonga and Fiji, at depths between about 310 and 425 metres (1,017 and 1,394 ft).
