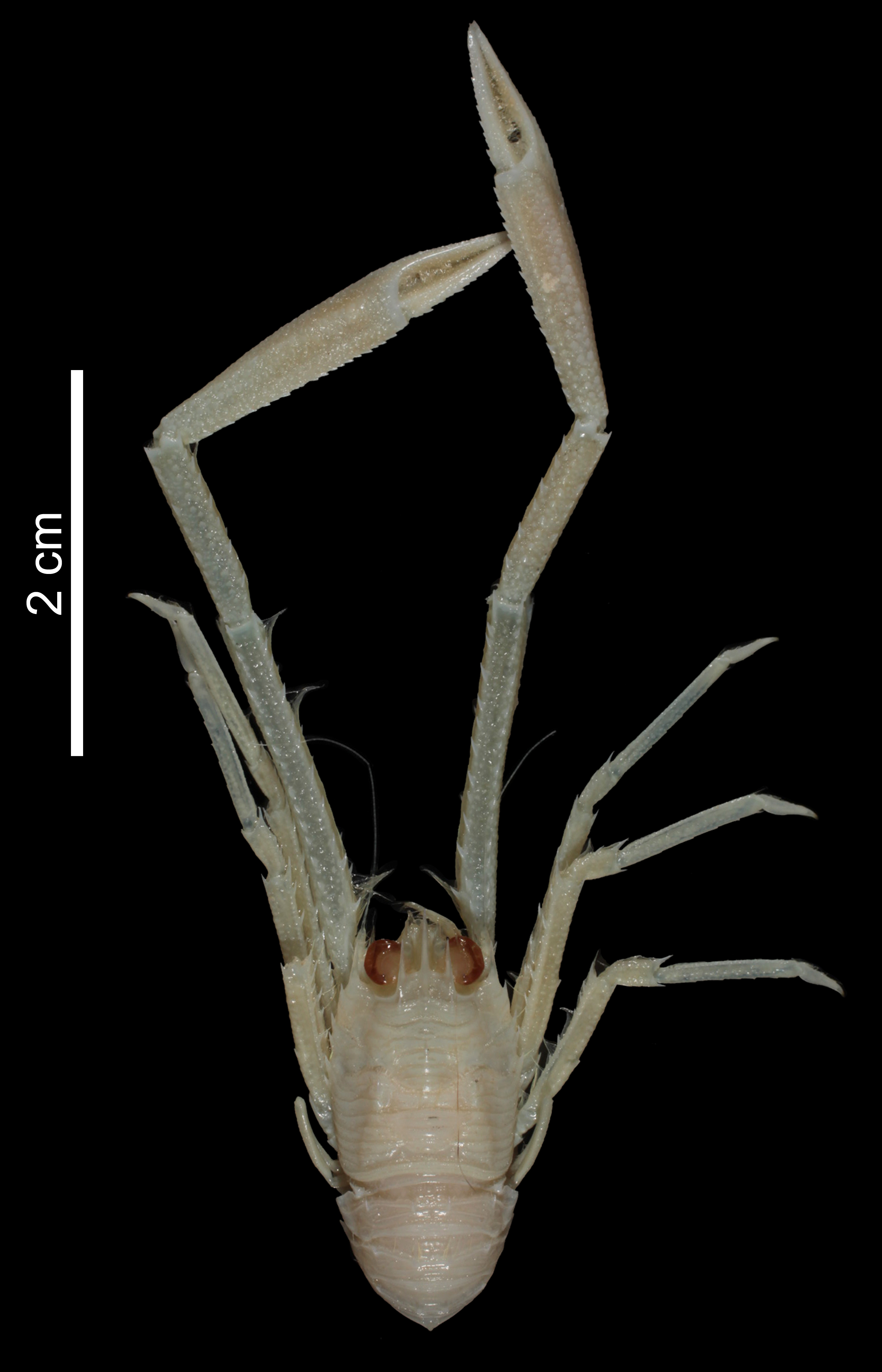

Scientific classification
- Kingdom: Animalia
- Phylum: Arthropoda
- Class: Malacostraca
- Order: Decapoda
- Suborder: Pleocyemata
- Infraorder: Anomura
- Family: Munididae
- Genus: Crosnierita
- Species: C. urizae

Binomial name
- Crosnierita urizae (Macpherson, 1994)

= Crosnierita urizae =

Species of crustacean

Crosnierita urizae is a species of squat lobster in the family Munididae. It is found off of New Caledonia, the Matthew and Hunter Islands, and the Chesterfield Islands, at depths between about 230 and 610 metres (750 and 2,000 ft).
