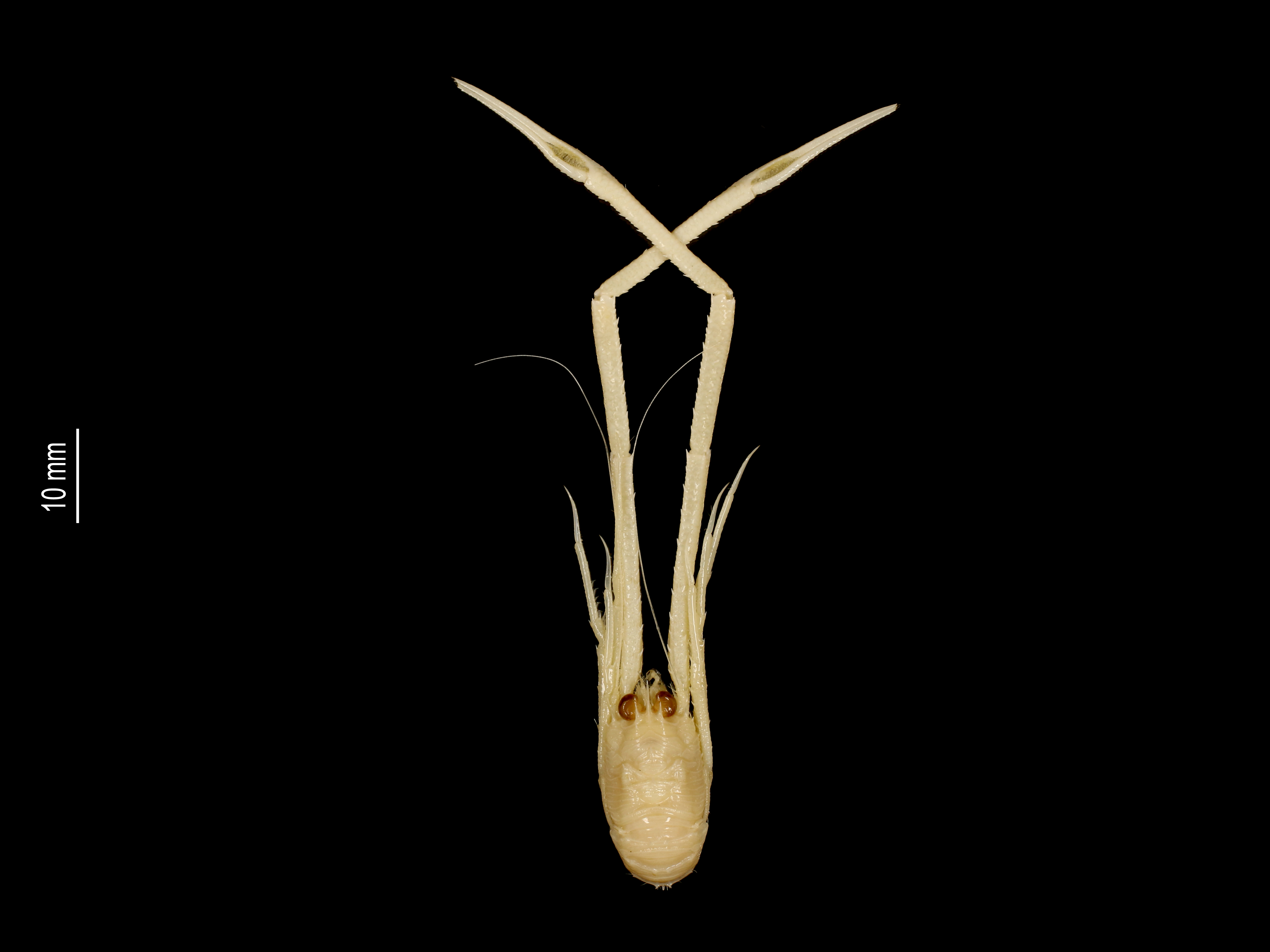

Scientific classification
- Kingdom: Animalia
- Phylum: Arthropoda
- Class: Malacostraca
- Order: Decapoda
- Suborder: Pleocyemata
- Infraorder: Anomura
- Family: Munididae
- Genus: Crosnierita
- Species: C. tucanae

Binomial name
- Crosnierita tucanae Macpherson, 2004

= Crosnierita tucanae =

Species of crustacean

Crosnierita tucanae is a species of squat lobster in the family Munididae. It is found off of Fiji, at depths between about 80 and 415 metres (262 and 1,362 ft).
