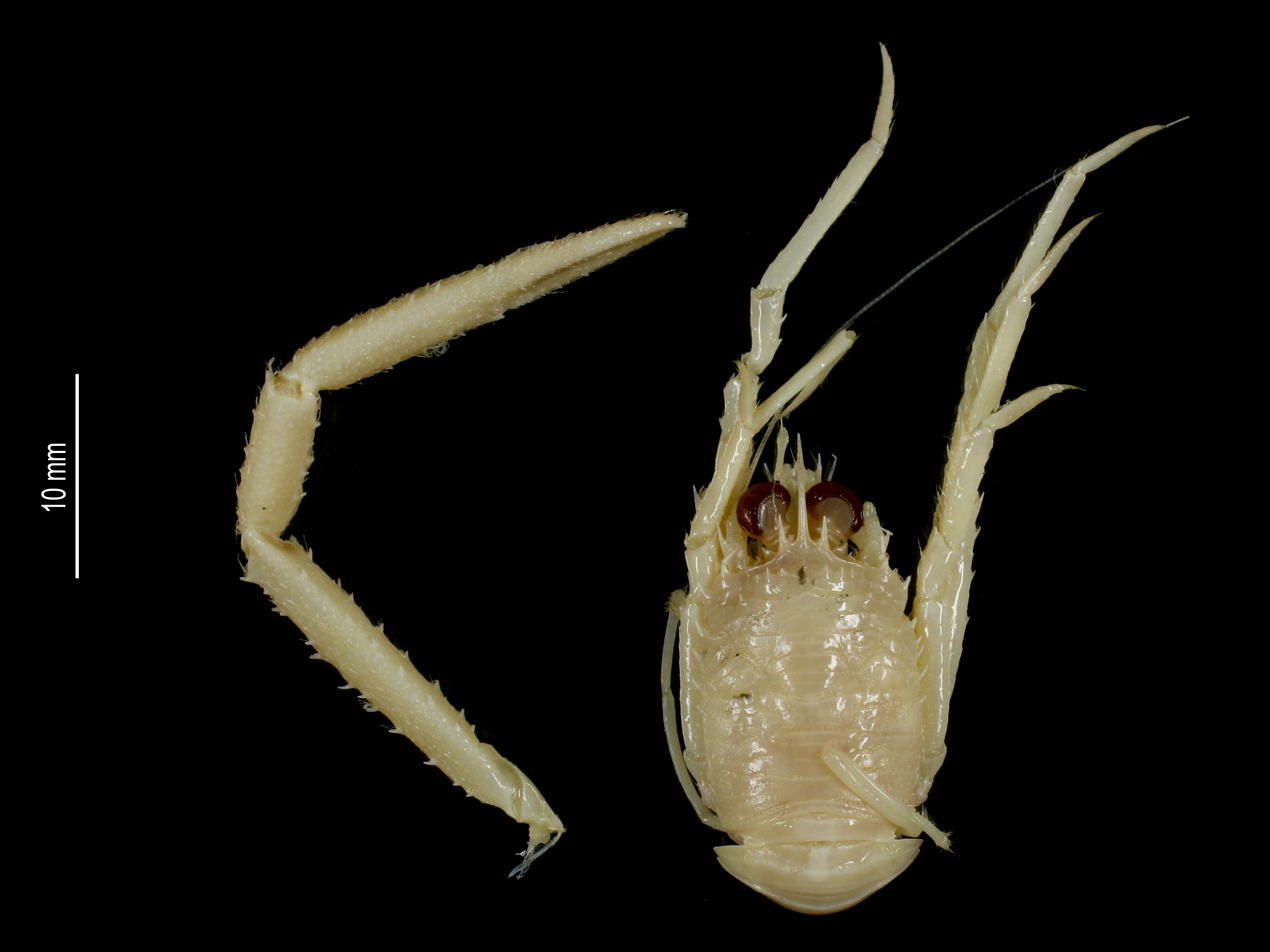
- Leptonida delicata

Scientific classification
- Kingdom: Animalia
- Phylum: Arthropoda
- Clade: Pancrustacea
- Class: Malacostraca
- Order: Decapoda
- Suborder: Pleocyemata
- Infraorder: Anomura
- Family: Munididae
- Genus: Leptonida; Macpherson & Baba, 2022

Type species
- Munida delicata Macpherson, 2004

= Leptonida =

Genus of crustaceans

Leptonida is a small genus of squat lobsters in the family Munididae. It was erected in 2022 to accommodate Munida delicata, now Leptonida delicata, in a major revision of the genus Munida. At the time, it was monotypic, but the World Register of Marine Species lists another species not mentioned in the 2022 revision. Leptonida delicata occurs in south-western Pacific Ocean.

The genus Leptonida name combines the Greek leptos (=thin) and the genus name, Munida, and refers to the thin carapace that characterize the genus.

== Species ==
There are two recognized species:

- Leptonida delicata (Macpherson, 2004)
- Leptonida vigiliarum (Alcock, 1901)
