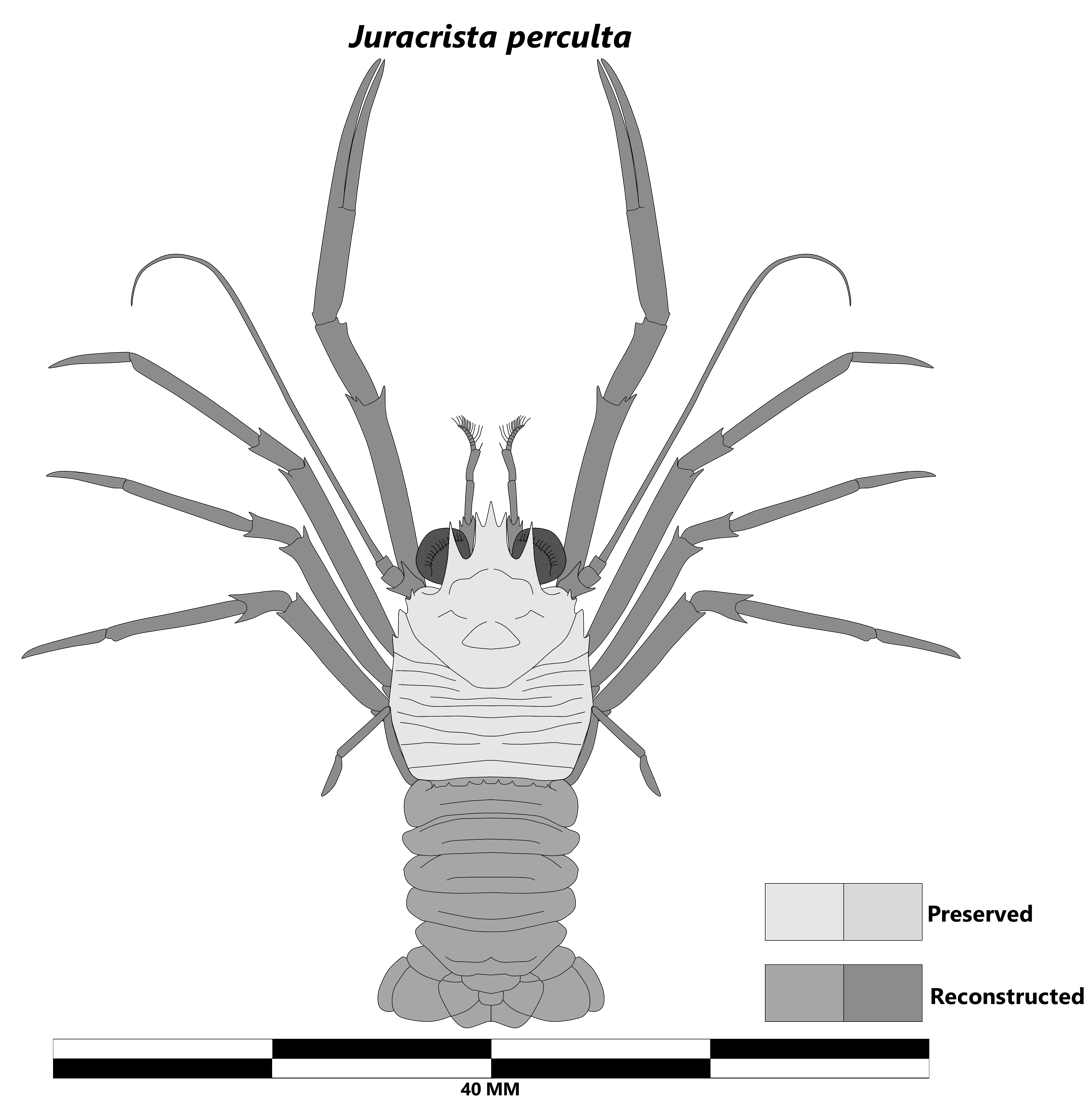
- Reconstruction of Juracrista perculta

Scientific classification
- Kingdom: Animalia
- Phylum: Arthropoda
- Class: Malacostraca
- Order: Decapoda
- Suborder: Pleocyemata
- Infraorder: Anomura
- Family: Munididae
- Genus: †Juracrista; Robins et al., 2012

= Juracrista =

Juracrista Temporal range: Late Jurassic (Tithonian) 152.1–143.1 Ma

Extinct genus of crustaceans

Juracrista is an extinct genus of squat lobster in the family Munididae. It was extant during the Jurassic Period, as the name suggests. It contains the following species:

- Juracrista costaspinosa Robins et al. 2012
- Juracrista perculta Robins et al. 2012
