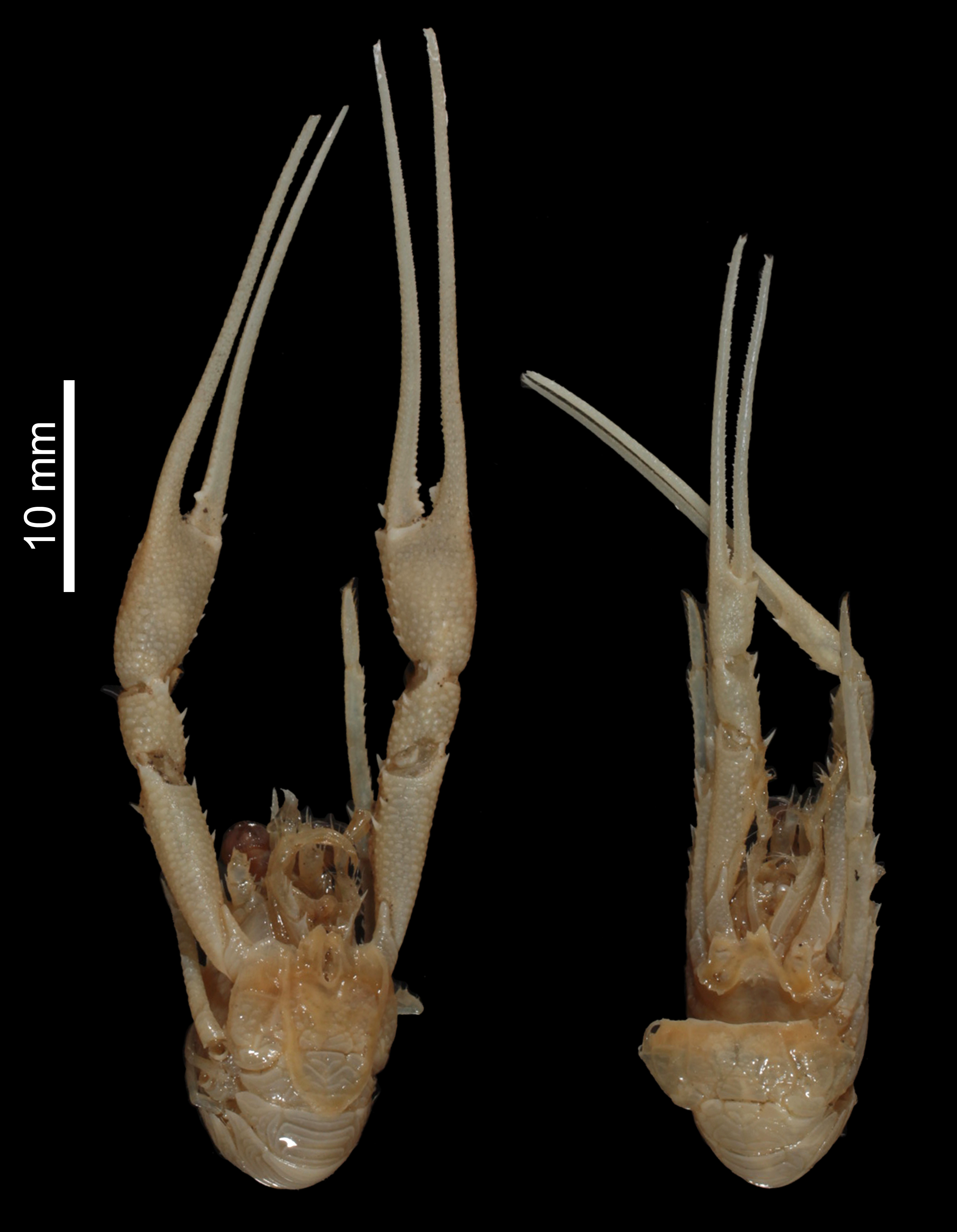
- Dactylonida curvimana

Scientific classification
- Kingdom: Animalia
- Phylum: Arthropoda
- Clade: Pancrustacea
- Class: Malacostraca
- Order: Decapoda
- Suborder: Pleocyemata
- Infraorder: Anomura
- Family: Munididae
- Genus: Dactylonida; Macpherson & Baba, 2022

Type species
- Munida curvimana A. Milne Edwards & Bouvier, 1894

= Dactylonida =

Genus of squat lobsters

Dactylonida is a small genus of squat lobsters in the family Munididae. It was erected in 2022 to accommodate two species formerly placed in Munida, one of them (Dactylonida curvimana) from the East Atlantic and the other (Dactylonida mexicana) from the Central-Eastern Pacific.

The genus Dactylonida name combines the Greek daktylos (=finger) and the genus name, Munida, and refers to the very long fingers on the chelipeds characteristic for the genus.

== Species ==
There are two recognized species:

- Dactylonida curvimana (A. Milne Edwards & Bouvier, 1894)
- Dactylonida mexicana (Benedict, 1902)
