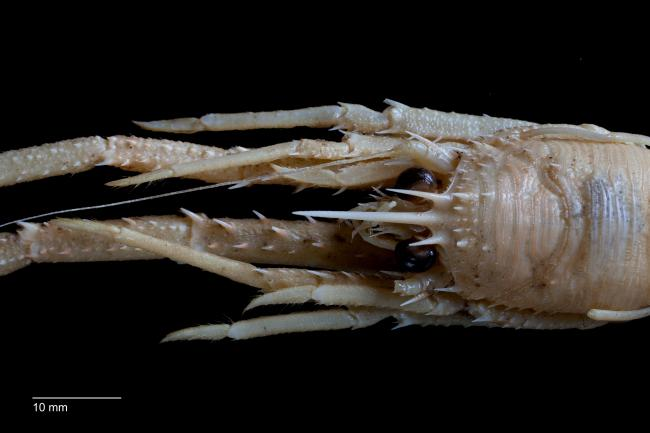
- Scolonida gracilis

Scientific classification
- Kingdom: Animalia
- Phylum: Arthropoda
- Clade: Pancrustacea
- Class: Malacostraca
- Order: Decapoda
- Suborder: Pleocyemata
- Infraorder: Anomura
- Family: Munididae
- Genus: Scolonida; Macpherson & Baba, 2022

Type species
- Munida gracilis Henderson, 1885

= Scolonida =

Genus of crustaceans

Scolonida is a small genus of squat lobsters in the family Munididae. It was erected in 2022 to accommodate three species previously placed in the genus Munida. The genus name combines the Greek scolos (=spine) and the genus name, Munida, and refers to the presence of protogastric spines that characterize the genus.

Scolonida are distributed in the Indian and Pacific Oceans, with one species found in the waters of Somalia, and two other near Australia and New Zealand.

== Species ==
There are three recognized species:

- Scolonida gracilis (Henderson, 1885)
- Scolonida haswelli (Henderson, 1885)
- Scolonida rubiesi (Macpherson, 1991)
