= Hendersonida =

Scientific classification
- Kingdom: Animalia
- Phylum: Arthropoda
- Class: Malacostraca
- Order: Decapoda
- Suborder: Pleocyemata
- Infraorder: Anomura
- Family: Munididae
- Genus: Hendersonida; Cabezas & Macpherson, 2014
- Species: H. granulata

Binomial name
- Hendersonida granulata (Henderson, 1885)

Genus of crustaceans

Hendersonida is a monotypic genus of squat lobsters in the family Munididae. Its only member is Hendersonida granulata. The genus name is in reference to John Robertson Henderson. Hendersonida is found off of the Philippines, Indonesia, Queensland, New Caledonia, Loyalty Islands, Fiji, Tonga, Futuna Island, Vanuatu, Wallis Islands, and Bayonnaise Bank, at depths between about 395 and 650 metres (1,296 and 2,133 ft).
