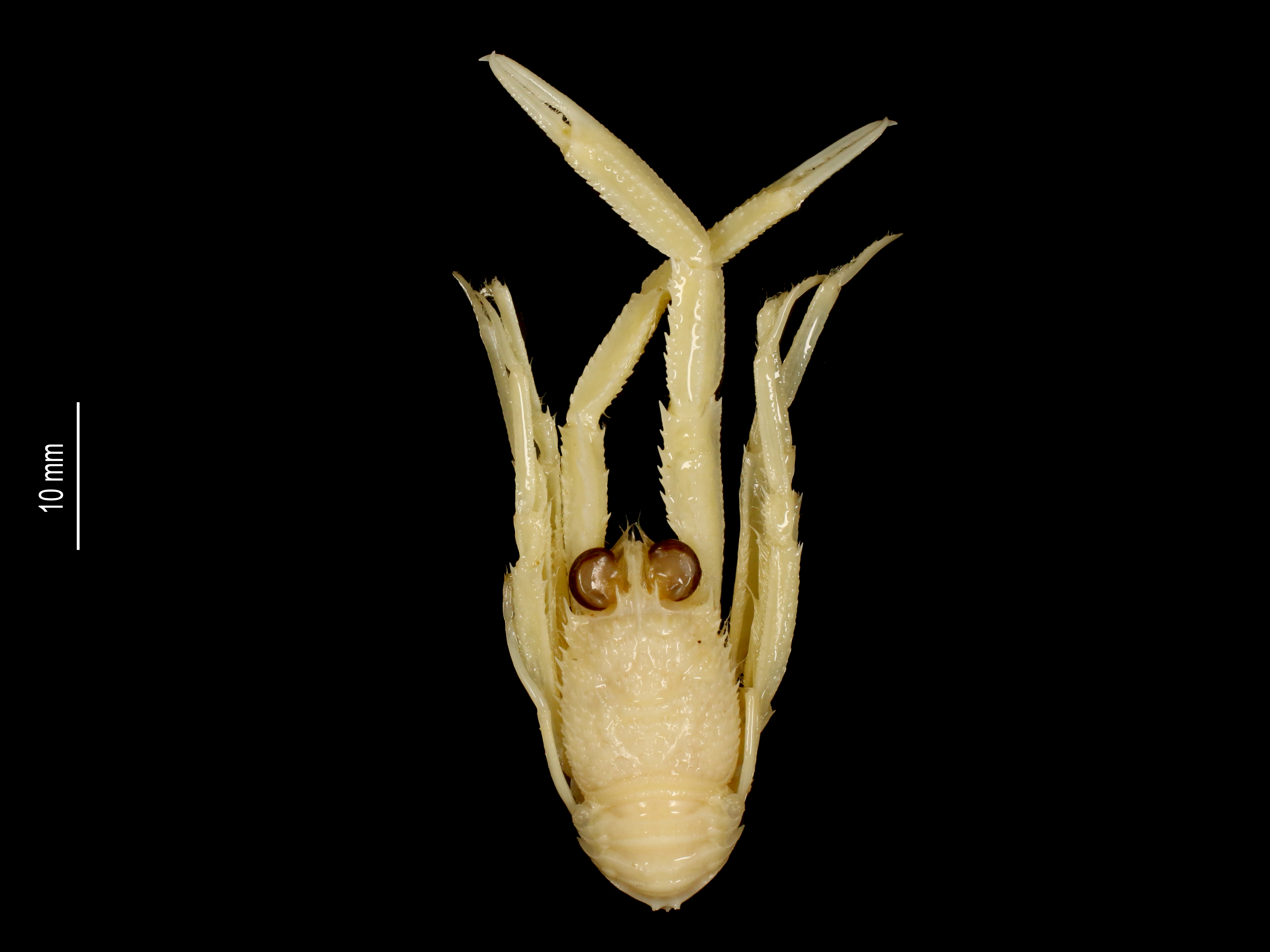
- Plesionida concava

Scientific classification
- Kingdom: Animalia
- Phylum: Arthropoda
- Clade: Pancrustacea
- Class: Malacostraca
- Order: Decapoda
- Suborder: Pleocyemata
- Infraorder: Anomura
- Family: Munididae
- Genus: Plesionida; Baba & de Saint Laurent, 1996

Type species
- Plesionida psila Baba & de Saint Laurent, 1996

= Plesionida =

Genus of crustaceans

Plesionida is a genus of squat lobsters in the family Munididae. As of 2017, it contains the following species:

- Plesionida aliena (Macpherson, 1996) — New Caledonia, Fiji, and Tonga, 445–545 m (1,460–1,788 ft).
- Plesionida aurelia Ahyong, Taylor & McCallum, 2013 — Northwestern Australia, 393–451 m (1,289–1,480 ft).
- Plesionida concava Cabezas, Macpherson & Machordom, 2009 — Solomon Islands, 399–427 m (1,309–1,401 ft).
- Plesionida psila Baba & de Saint Laurent, 1996 — New Caledonia, 590–613 m (1,936–2,011 ft).

The generic name is a combination of the Greek plesios, meaning "near" and the final syllables of Munida. Its gender is feminine.
