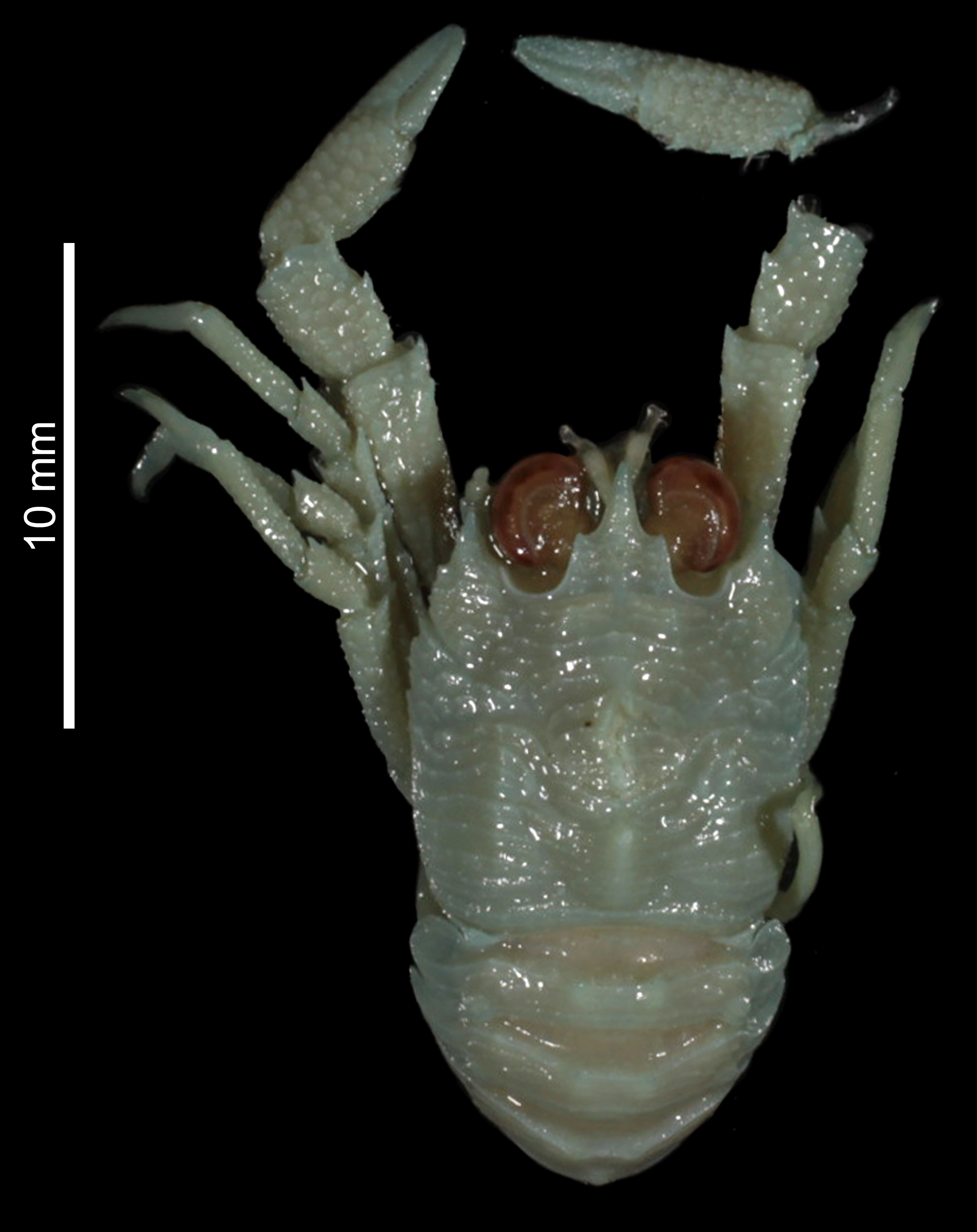

Scientific classification
- Kingdom: Animalia
- Phylum: Arthropoda
- Clade: Pancrustacea
- Class: Malacostraca
- Order: Decapoda
- Suborder: Pleocyemata
- Infraorder: Anomura
- Family: Munididae
- Genus: Neonida; Baba & de Saint Laurent, 1996
- Species: N. grandis

Binomial name
- Neonida grandis Baba & de Saint Laurent, 1996

= Neonida =

Genus of crustaceans

Neonida grandis is a species of squat lobster in the monotypic genus Neonida in the family Munididae.
