= Anomoeomunida =

Scientific classification
- Kingdom: Animalia
- Phylum: Arthropoda
- Clade: Pancrustacea
- Class: Malacostraca
- Order: Decapoda
- Suborder: Pleocyemata
- Infraorder: Anomura
- Family: Munididae
- Genus: Anomoeomunida; Baba, 1993
- Species: A. caribensis

Binomial name
- Anomoeomunida caribensis (Mayo, 1972)

Synonyms
- Phylladiorhynchus caribensis Mayo, 1972

Genus of crustaceans

Anomoeomunida is a monotypic squat lobster genus in the family Munididae. The sole a species of is Anomoeomunida caribensis. It occurs in the western Atlantic.
