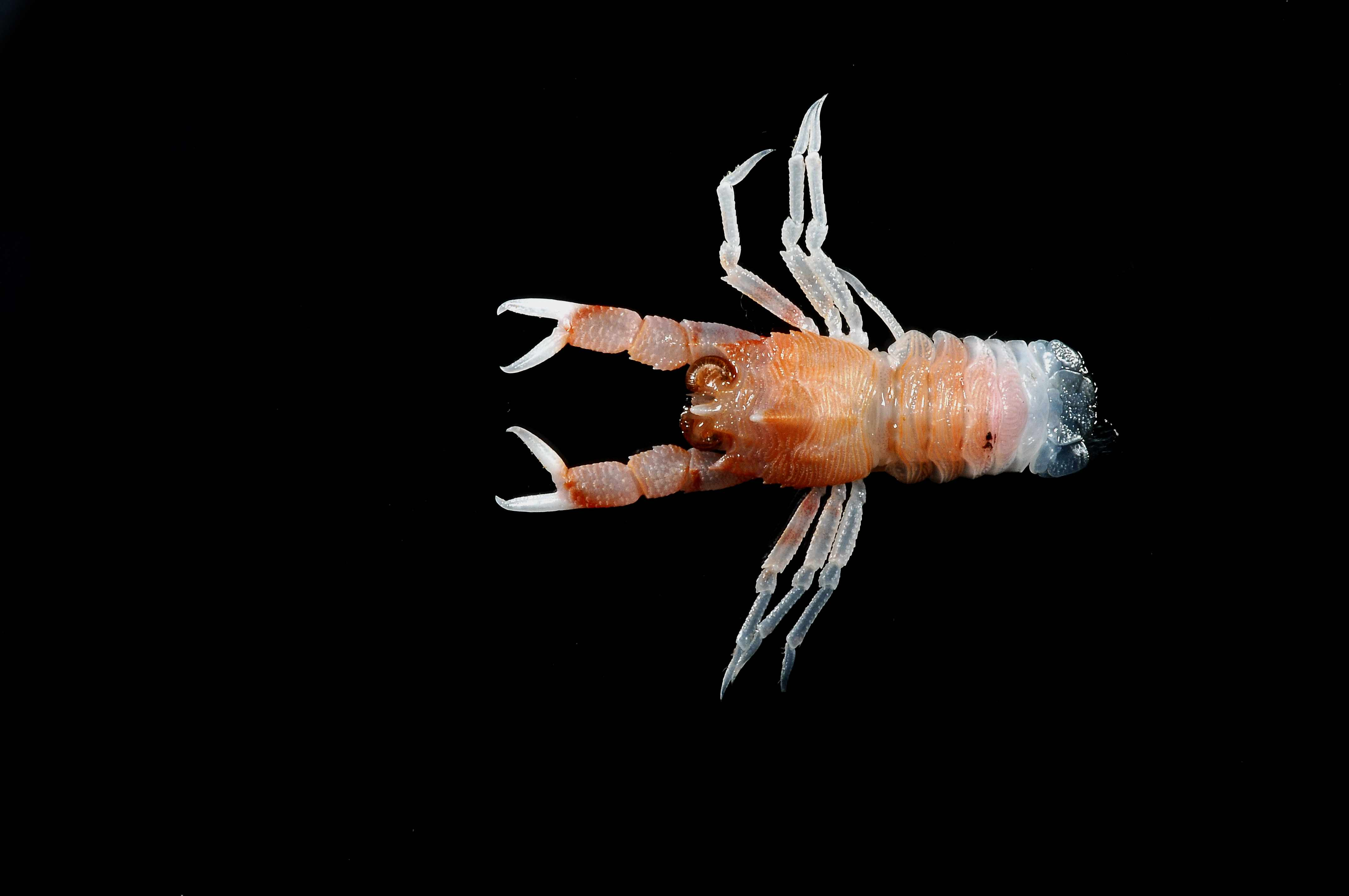
- Onconida alaini

Scientific classification
- Kingdom: Animalia
- Phylum: Arthropoda
- Clade: Pancrustacea
- Class: Malacostraca
- Order: Decapoda
- Suborder: Pleocyemata
- Infraorder: Anomura
- Family: Munididae
- Genus: Onconida; Baba & de Saint Laurent, 1996

= Onconida =

Genus of crustaceans

Onconida is a genus of squat lobsters in the family Munididae, containing the following species:

- Onconida alaini Baba & de Saint Laurent, 1996
- Onconida gemini Baba & de Saint Laurent, 1996
- Onconida modica Baba & de Saint Laurent, 1996
- Onconida prostrata Baba & de Saint Laurent, 1996
- Onconida tropis Baba & de Saint Laurent, 1996
