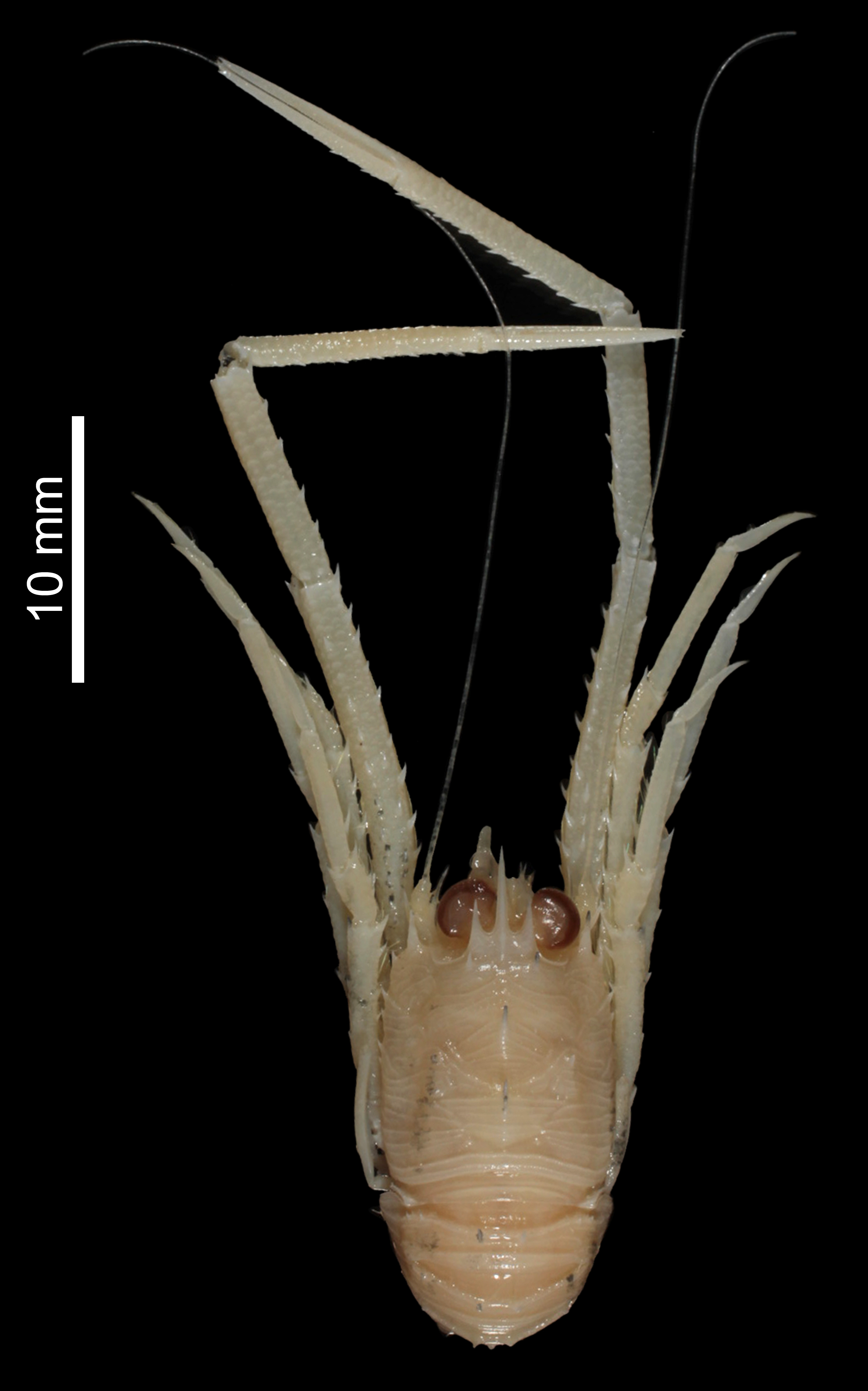
- Crosnierita dicata

Scientific classification
- Kingdom: Animalia
- Phylum: Arthropoda
- Class: Malacostraca
- Order: Decapoda
- Suborder: Pleocyemata
- Infraorder: Anomura
- Family: Munididae
- Genus: Crosnierita; Macpherson, 1998

= Crosnierita =

Genus of crustaceans

Crosnierita is a genus of squat lobsters in the family Munididae, containing the following species:

- Crosnierita adela Ahyong, Taylor & McCallum, 2013
- Crosnierita dicata Macpherson, 1998
- Crosnierita tucanae Macpherson, 2004
- Crosnierita urizae (Macpherson, 1994)
- Crosnierita yante (Macpherson, 1994)
