= Cretagalathea =

Cretagalathea Temporal range: 100.5–93.9 Ma

Scientific classification
- Kingdom: Animalia
- Phylum: Arthropoda
- Class: Malacostraca
- Order: Decapoda
- Suborder: Pleocyemata
- Infraorder: Anomura
- Family: Munididae
- Genus: †Cretagalathea; Garassino, De Angeli & Pasini, 2008
- Species: †C. exigua

Binomial name
- †Cretagalathea exigua Garassino, De Angeli & Pasini, 2008

Extinct species of crustacean

Cretagalathea exigua is an extinct species of squat lobster in the family Munididae. It is the single member of the genus Cretagalathea.
