= Enriquea =

Scientific classification
- Kingdom: Animalia
- Phylum: Arthropoda
- Clade: Pancrustacea
- Class: Malacostraca
- Order: Decapoda
- Suborder: Pleocyemata
- Infraorder: Anomura
- Family: Munididae
- Genus: Enriquea; Baba, 2005
- Species: E. leviantennata

Binomial name
- Enriquea leviantennata (Baba, 1988)

Genus of crustaceans

Enriquea leviantennata is a species of squat lobster in the monotypic genus Enriquea in the family Munididae.
