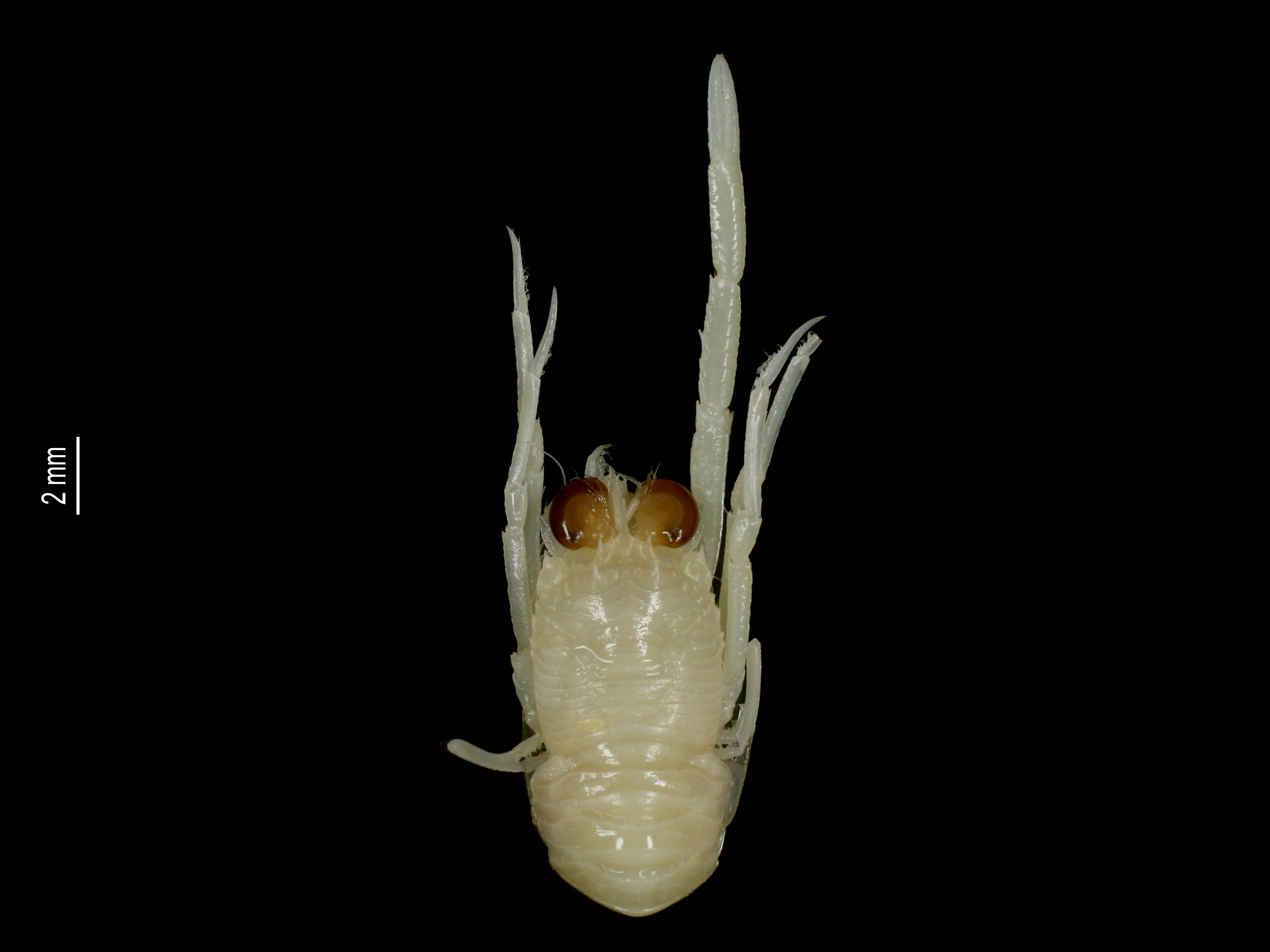
- Torbenella calvata

Scientific classification
- Kingdom: Animalia
- Phylum: Arthropoda
- Clade: Pancrustacea
- Class: Malacostraca
- Order: Decapoda
- Suborder: Pleocyemata
- Infraorder: Anomura
- Family: Munididae
- Genus: Torbenella; Baba, 2008

Synonyms
- Torbenia Baba, 2005

= Torbenella =

Genus of crustaceans

Torbenella is a genus of squat lobsters in the family Munididae. They occur in the western Pacific Ocean.

== Species ==
There are seven recognized species:

- Torbenella aequabilis Macpherson, Rodriguez-Flores & Machordom, 2023
- Torbenella calvata (Macpherson, 2006)
- Torbenella crateris Macpherson, Rodriguez-Flores & Machordom, 2023
- Torbenella insolita (Macpherson, 2004)
- Torbenella lupi Macpherson, Rodriguez-Flores & Machordom, 2023
- Torbenella mensae Macpherson, Rodriguez-Flores & Machordom, 2023
- Torbenella orbis (Baba, 2005)
