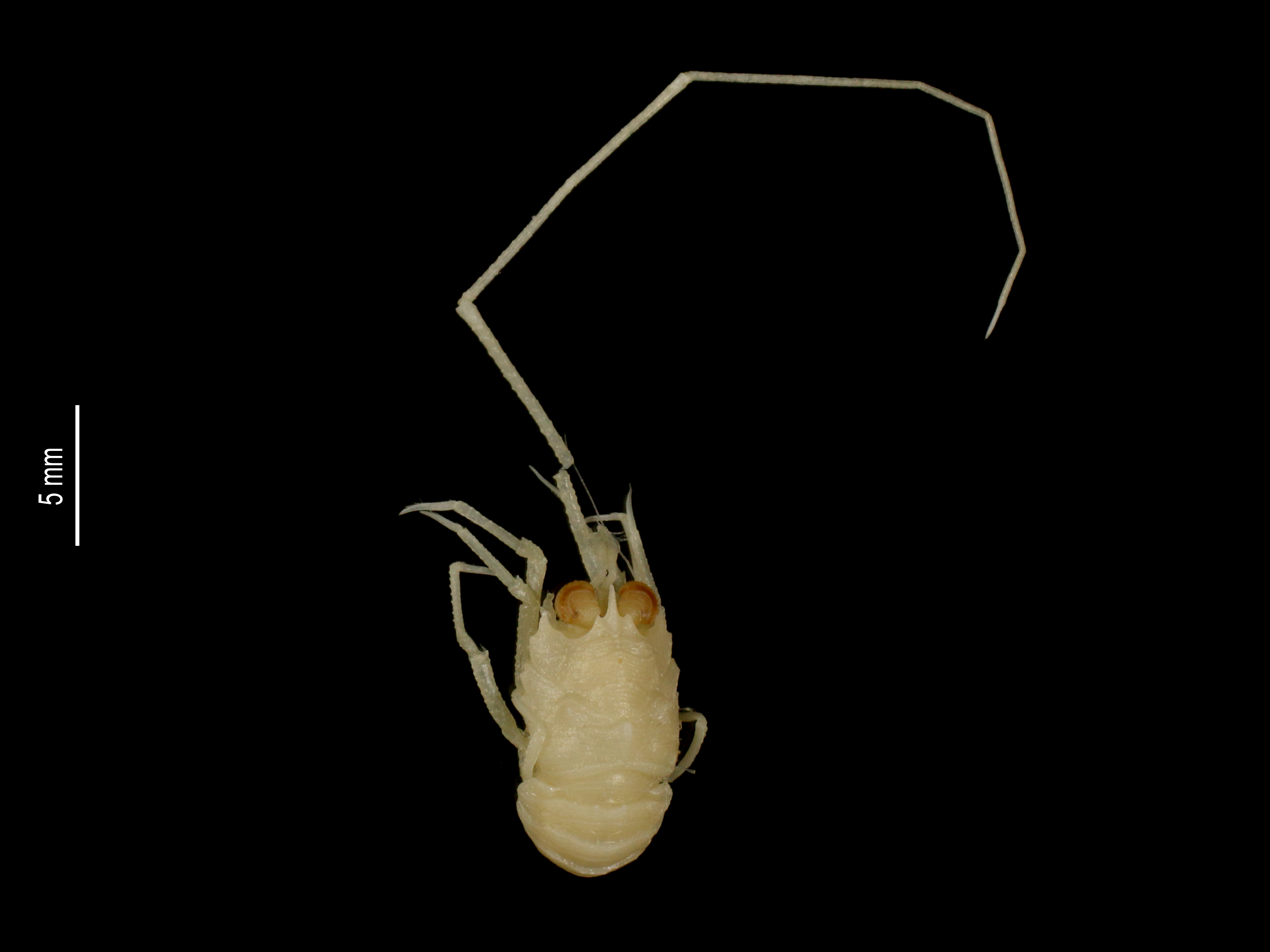
- Anoplonida patae

Scientific classification
- Kingdom: Animalia
- Phylum: Arthropoda
- Clade: Pancrustacea
- Class: Malacostraca
- Order: Decapoda
- Suborder: Pleocyemata
- Infraorder: Anomura
- Family: Munididae
- Genus: Anoplonida; Baba & de Saint Laurent, 1996

= Anoplonida =

Genus of crustaceans

Anoplonida is a genus of squat lobsters, which are flattened dorsoventrally, in the family Munididae, containing the following species:

- Anoplonida cracentis Baba & de Saint Laurent, 1996
- Anoplonida inermis (Baba, 1994)
- Anoplonida patae Macpherson & Baba, 2006
