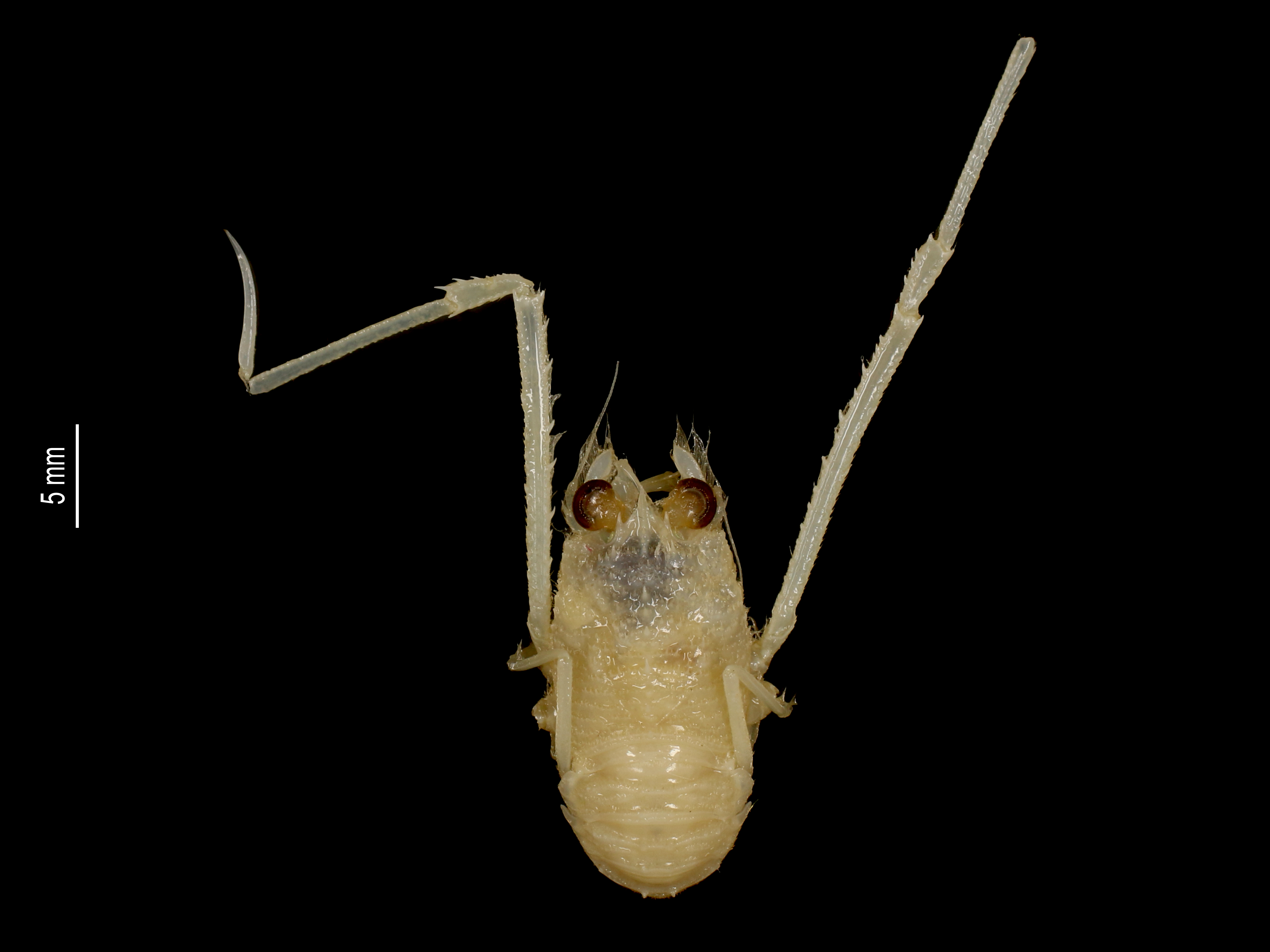
- Paramunida spatula

Scientific classification
- Kingdom: Animalia
- Phylum: Arthropoda
- Clade: Pancrustacea
- Class: Malacostraca
- Order: Decapoda
- Suborder: Pleocyemata
- Infraorder: Anomura
- Family: Munididae
- Genus: Paramunida; Baba, 1988

= Paramunida =

Genus of crustaceans

Paramunida is a genus of squat lobsters in the family Munididae, containing the following species:

- Paramunida amphitrita Macpherson, 1996
- Paramunida antipodes Ahyong & Poore, 2004
- Paramunida belone Macpherson, 1993
- Paramunida cretata Macpherson, 1996
- Paramunida cristata Macpherson, 2004
- Paramunida curvata Macpherson, 2004
- Paramunida echinata Macpherson, 2000
- Paramunida evexa Macpherson, 1993
- Paramunida granulata (Henderson, 1885)
- Paramunida hawaiiensis (Baba, 1981)
- Paramunida labis Macpherson, 1996
- Paramunida longior Baba, 1988
- Paramunida luminata Macpherson, 1996
- Paramunida pictura Macpherson, 1993
- Paramunida polita Macpherson, 1993
- Paramunida pronoe Macpherson, 1993
- Paramunida proxima (Henderson, 1885)
- Paramunida scabra (Henderson, 1885)
- Paramunida setigera Baba, 1988
- Paramunida spatula Macpherson, 2006
- Paramunida stichas Macpherson, 1993
- Paramunida thalie Macpherson, 1993
- Paramunida tricarinata (Alcock, 1894)
