= Tasmanida =

Scientific classification
- Domain: Eukaryota
- Kingdom: Animalia
- Phylum: Arthropoda
- Class: Malacostraca
- Order: Decapoda
- Suborder: Pleocyemata
- Infraorder: Anomura
- Family: Munididae
- Genus: Tasmanida; Ahyong, 2007
- Species: T. norfolkae

Binomial name
- Tasmanida norfolkae Ahyong, 2007

Genus of crustaceans

Tasmanida norfolkae is a species of squat lobster in the monotypic genus Tasmanida in the family Munididae.
