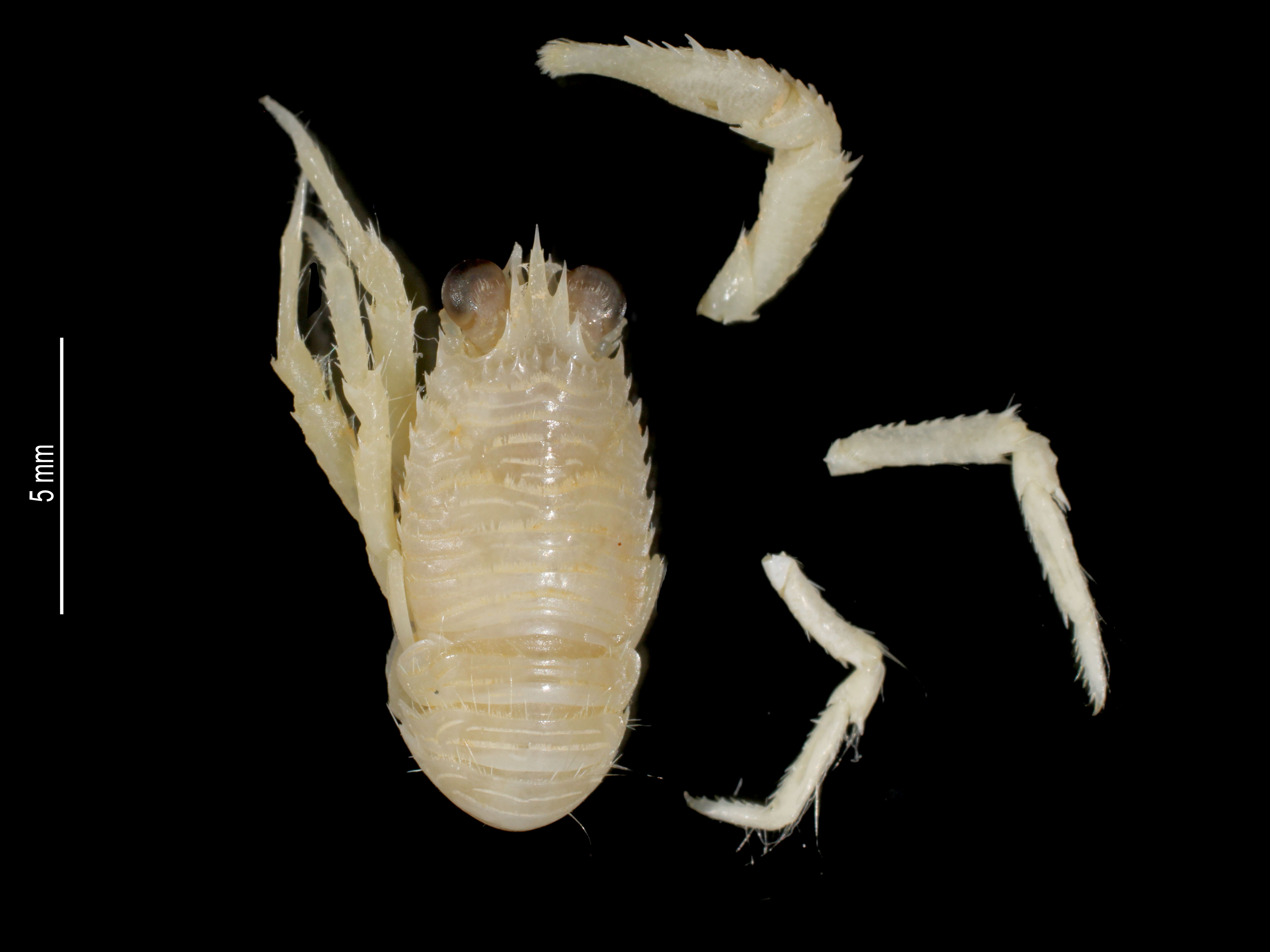
- Sadayoshia inermis

Scientific classification
- Kingdom: Animalia
- Phylum: Arthropoda
- Clade: Pancrustacea
- Class: Malacostraca
- Order: Decapoda
- Suborder: Pleocyemata
- Infraorder: Anomura
- Family: Munididae
- Genus: Sadayoshia; Baba, 1969

= Sadayoshia =

Genus of crustaceans

Sadayoshia is a genus of 15 species of squat lobsters in the family Munididae.

== Species ==
- Sadayoshia acamar Macpherson & Baba, 2012
- Sadayoshia acroporae Baba, 1972
- Sadayoshia actaea Macpherson & Baba, 2012
- Sadayoshia adaro Macpherson & Baba, 2012
- Sadayoshia aludra Macpherson & Baba, 2012
- Sadayoshia balica (Boone, 1935)
- Sadayoshia edwardsii (Miers, 1884)
- Sadayoshia inermis Macpherson & Baba, 2010
- Sadayoshia latisternata Macpherson & Baba, 2010
- Sadayoshia lipkei Macpherson & Baba, 2010
- Sadayoshia miyakei Baba, 1969
- Sadayoshia moorei Macpherson & Baba, 2012
- Sadayoshia savali Macpherson & Baba, 2012
- Sadayoshia tenuirostris Macpherson & Baba, 2010
- Sadayoshia brevirostrum Tiwari, Padate, Cubelio & Osawa, 2024
