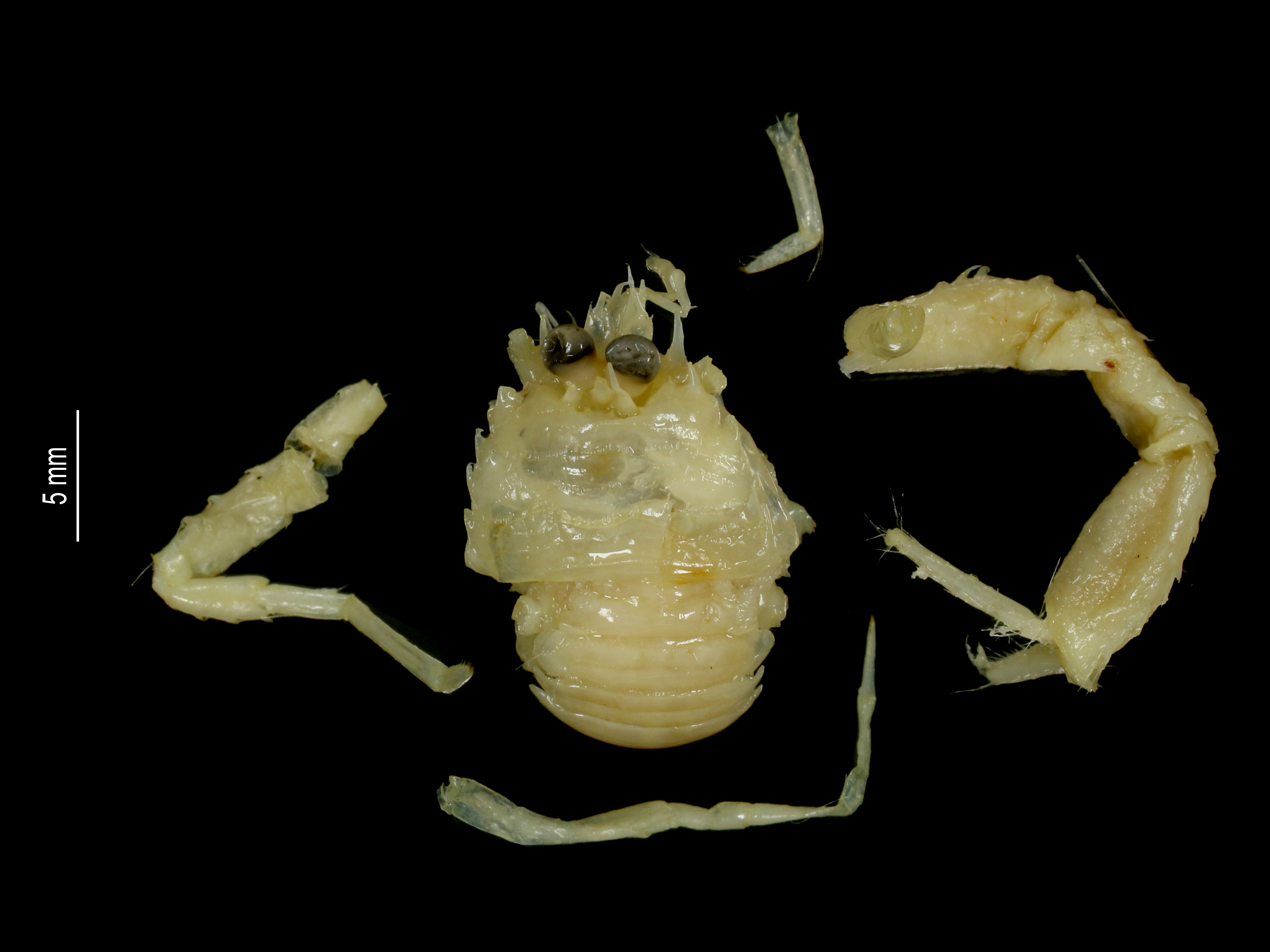
- Raymunida confundens

Scientific classification
- Kingdom: Animalia
- Phylum: Arthropoda
- Class: Malacostraca
- Order: Decapoda
- Suborder: Pleocyemata
- Infraorder: Anomura
- Family: Munididae
- Genus: Raymunida; Macpherson & Machordom, 2000

= Raymunida =

Genus of crustaceans

Raymunida is a genus of squat lobsters in the family Munididae, containing the following 11 species:

- Raymunida bellior (Miyake & Baba, 1967)
- Raymunida cagnetei Macpherson & Machordom, 2000
- Raymunida confundens Macpherson & Machordom, 2001
- Raymunida dextralis Macpherson & Machordom, 2001
- Raymunida elegantissima (De Man, 1902)
- Raymunida erythrina Macpherson & Machordom, 2001
- Raymunida formosanus Lin, Chan & Chu, 2004
- Raymunida insulata Macpherson & Machordom, 2001
- Raymunida limbata Macpherson, 2006
- Raymunida lineata Osawa, 2005
- Raymunida vittata Macpherson, 2009
