= Setanida =

Scientific classification
- Kingdom: Animalia
- Phylum: Arthropoda
- Class: Malacostraca
- Order: Decapoda
- Suborder: Pleocyemata
- Infraorder: Anomura
- Family: Munididae
- Genus: Setanida; Macpherson, 2006
- Species: S. cristata

Binomial name
- Setanida cristata Macpherson, 2006

Genus of crustaceans

Setanida cristata is a species of squat lobster in the monotypic genus Setanida in the family Munididae.
