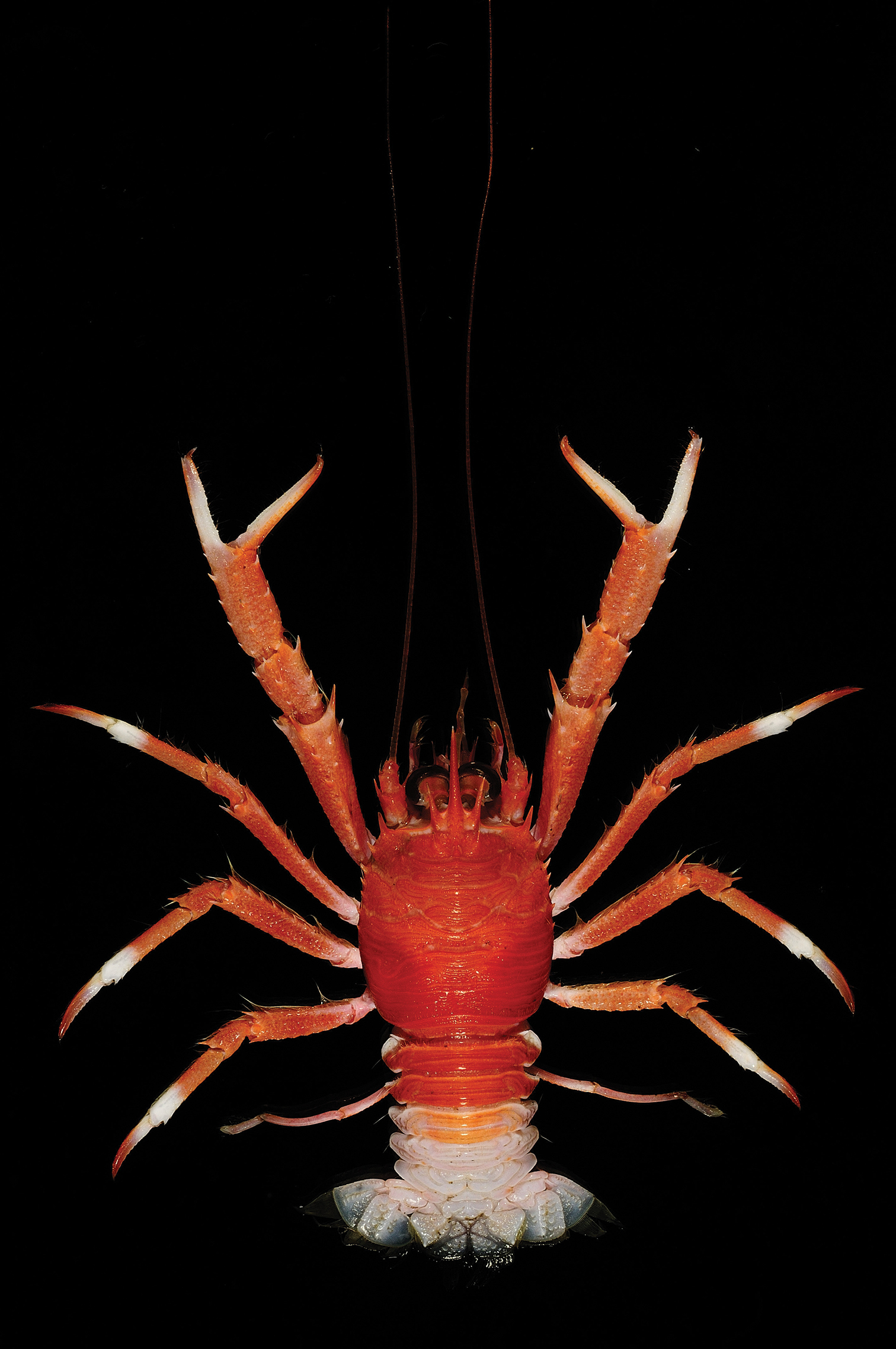
- Munida compacta

Scientific classification
- Kingdom: Animalia
- Phylum: Arthropoda
- Clade: Pancrustacea
- Class: Malacostraca
- Order: Decapoda
- Suborder: Pleocyemata
- Infraorder: Anomura
- Superfamily: Galatheoidea
- Family: Munididae; Ahyong, Baba, Macpherson, Poore, 2010

= Munididae =

Munididae Temporal range: Tithonian–recent

Family of crustaceans

Munididae is a family of squat lobsters, taxonomically separated from the family Galatheidae in 2010.

== Description and ecology ==
The squat lobsters in the family Munididae can be distinguished from other families by the presence of a trispinose frontal edge to the carapace, as well as a central rostrum, and two spines extend forward from above the eyes. Although a few species enter shallow water, the majority of species in the Munididae are deep-water taxa, in contrast to the mostly shallow-water Galatheidae.

== Taxonomy ==
Many of the genera included in the family Munididae had previously been included in a wider circumscription of the family Galatheidae. The following genera are now recognised:

- Agononida Baba & de Saint Laurent, 1996
- Anomoeomunida Baba, 1993
- Anoplonida Baba & de Saint Laurent, 1996
- Antillimunida Macpherson & Baba in Machordom et al., 2022
- Arabiconida Macpherson & Baba in Machordom et al., 2022
- †Austromunida Schweitzer & Feldmann, 2000
- Babamunida Cabezas, Macpherson & Machordom, 2008
- Bathymunida Balss, 1914
- †Cretagalathea Garassino, De Angeli & Pasini, 2008 – Upper Cretaceous
- Crosnierita Macpherson, 1998
- Curtonida Macpherson & Baba in Machordom et al., 2022
- Dactylonida Macpherson & Baba in Machordom et al., 2022
- Enriquea Baba, 2005
- Garymunida Macpherson & Baba in Machordom et al., 2022
- Gonionida Macpherson & Baba in Machordom et al., 2022
- Grimothea Leach, 1820
- Hendersonida Cabezas & Macpherson, 2014
- Heteronida Baba & de Saint Laurent, 1996
- Hexamunida Macpherson & Baba in Machordom et al., 2022
- Iridonida Macpherson & Baba in Machordom et al., 2022
- Ischnonida Macpherson & Baba in Machordom et al., 2022
- † Juracrista Robins, Feldmann & Schweitzer, 2012 – Late Jurassic (Tithonian)
- Leptonida Macpherson & Baba in Machordom et al., 2022
- †Muellermunida Beschin, Busulini & Tessier
- Munida Leach, 1820
- Neonida Baba & de Saint Laurent, 1996
- Onconida Baba & de Saint Laurent, 1996
- Paramunida Baba, 1988
- Plesionida Baba & de Saint Laurent, 1996
- Raymunida Macpherson & Machordom, 2000
- Sadayoshia Baba, 1969
- Scolonida Macpherson & Baba in Machordom et al., 2022
- Setanida Macpherson, 2006
- Tasmanida Ahyong, 2007
- †Tethysmunida De Angeli & Ceccon, 2017
- Torbenella Baba, 2008
- Trapezionida Macpherson & Baba in Machordom et al., 2022
- Typhlonida Macpherson & Baba in Machordom et al., 2022
- †Valamunida Klompmaker & Robins in Hryniewicz et al., 2019
