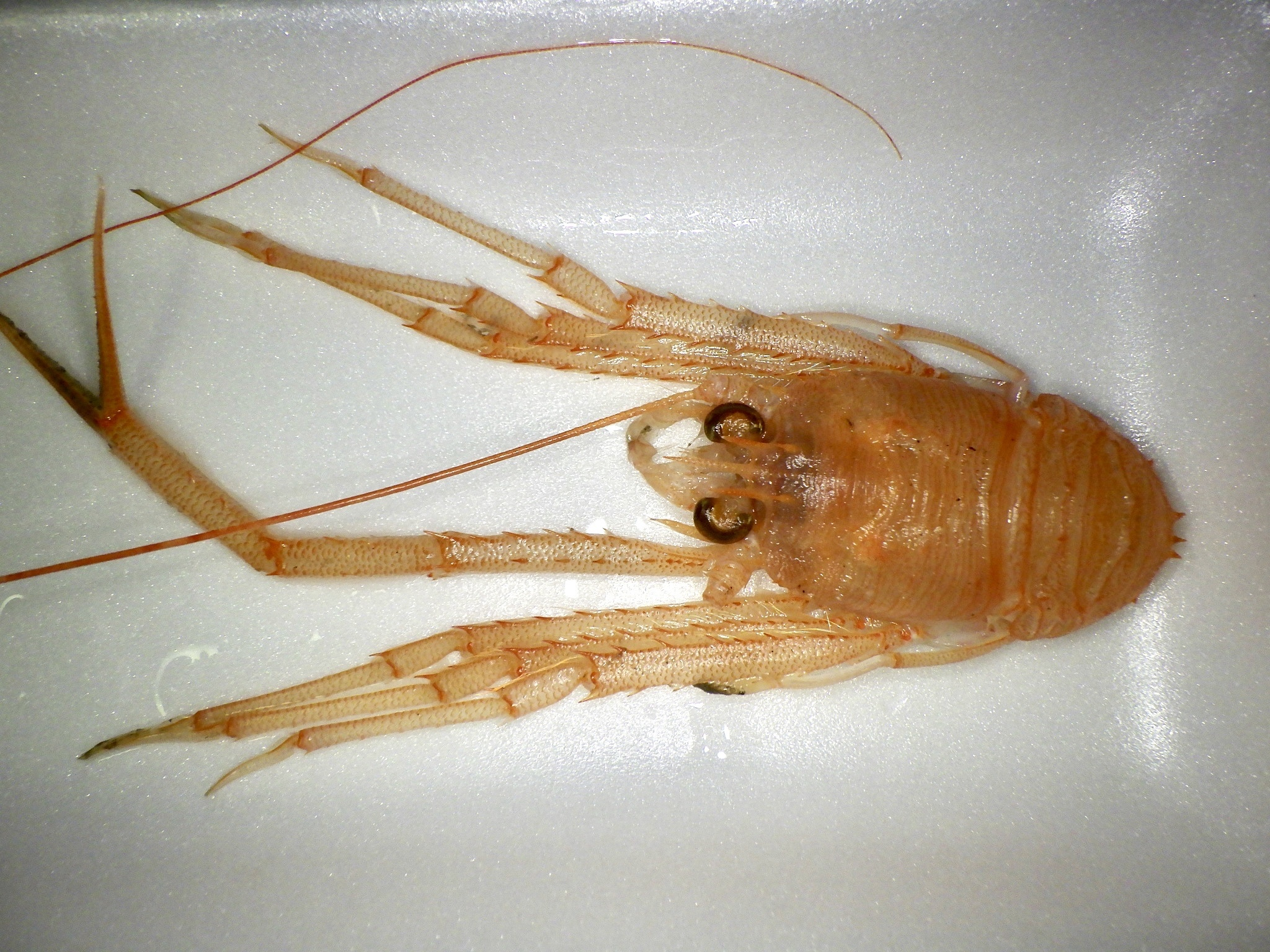

Scientific classification
- Kingdom: Animalia
- Phylum: Arthropoda
- Class: Malacostraca
- Order: Decapoda
- Suborder: Pleocyemata
- Infraorder: Anomura
- Family: Munididae
- Genus: Agononida
- Species: A. incerta

Binomial name
- Agononida incerta (Henderson, 1888)

= Agononida incerta =

Species of crustacean

Agononida incerta is a species of squat lobster in the family Munididae. It is found from Taiwan and the Philippines to southern Western Australia, ranging from 280 to 460 metres (920 to 1,510 ft) in depth. The males usually measure from 7 to 38 millimetres (0.28 to 1.50 in) and the females from 7.5 to 21 millimetres (0.30 to 0.83 in). It forms a species complex with A. africerta, A. auscerta, A. indocerta, A. norfocerta, A. madagascerta, A. polycerta, A. tasmancerta, A. vanuacerta, and A. rubrizonata.
