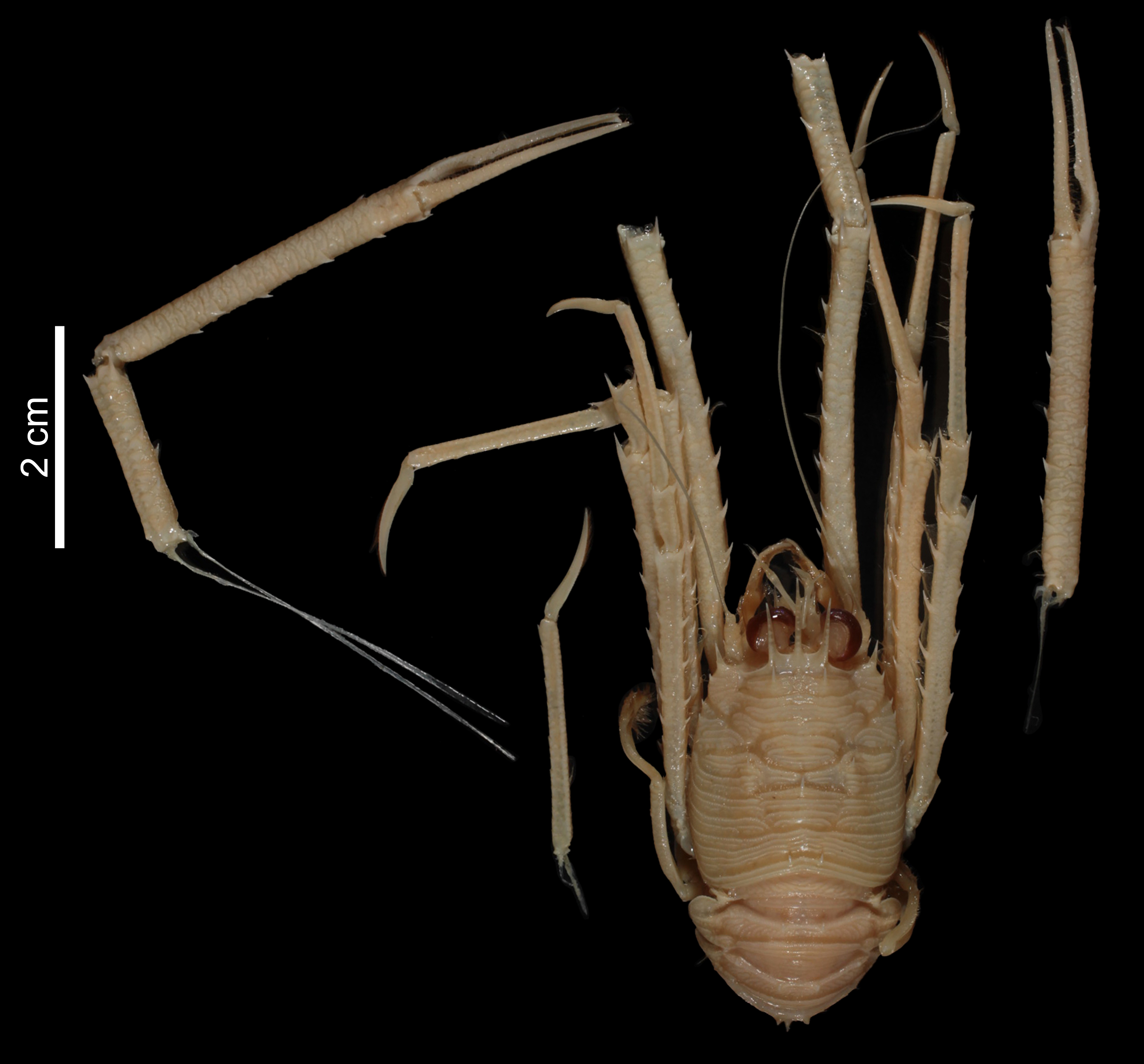

Scientific classification
- Kingdom: Animalia
- Phylum: Arthropoda
- Class: Malacostraca
- Order: Decapoda
- Suborder: Pleocyemata
- Infraorder: Anomura
- Family: Munididae
- Genus: Garymunida
- Species: G. analoga

Binomial name
- Garymunida analoga (Macpherson, 1993)

Synonyms
- Munida analoga Macpherson, 1993; Agononida analoga (Macpherson, 1993)

= Garymunida analoga =

Species of crustacean

Garymunida analoga is a species of squat lobster in the family Munididae. It is found in the Indo-Pacific. The specific name is derived from the Greek analogos, meaning "resembling", which is in reference to its similarity to both Agononida squamosa (=Garymunida squamosa) and Agononida similis (=Garymunida similis).
