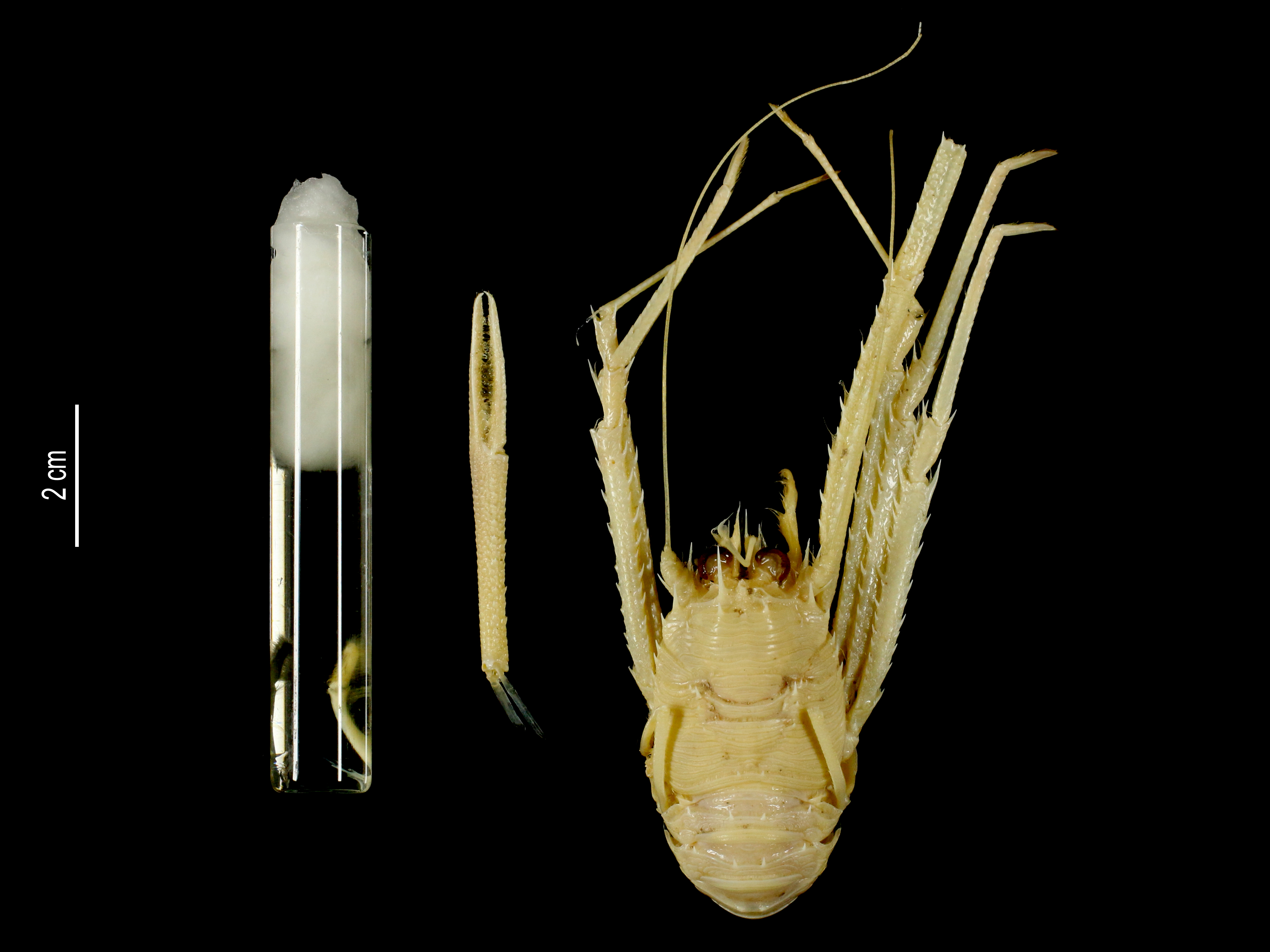
- Paratype of Garymunida aequabilis

Scientific classification
- Kingdom: Animalia
- Phylum: Arthropoda
- Class: Malacostraca
- Order: Decapoda
- Suborder: Pleocyemata
- Infraorder: Anomura
- Family: Munididae
- Genus: Garymunida
- Species: G. aequabilis

Binomial name
- Garymunida aequabilis (Macpherson, 2006)

Synonyms
- Agononida aequabilis Macpherson, 2006

= Garymunida aequabilis =

Species of crustacean

Garymunida aequabilis is a species of squat lobster in the family Munididae. It occurs in the Pacific Ocean. The specific name is derived from the Latin aequabilis, meaning "equal", or "similar", in reference to its similarity to Garymunida pilosimanus.
