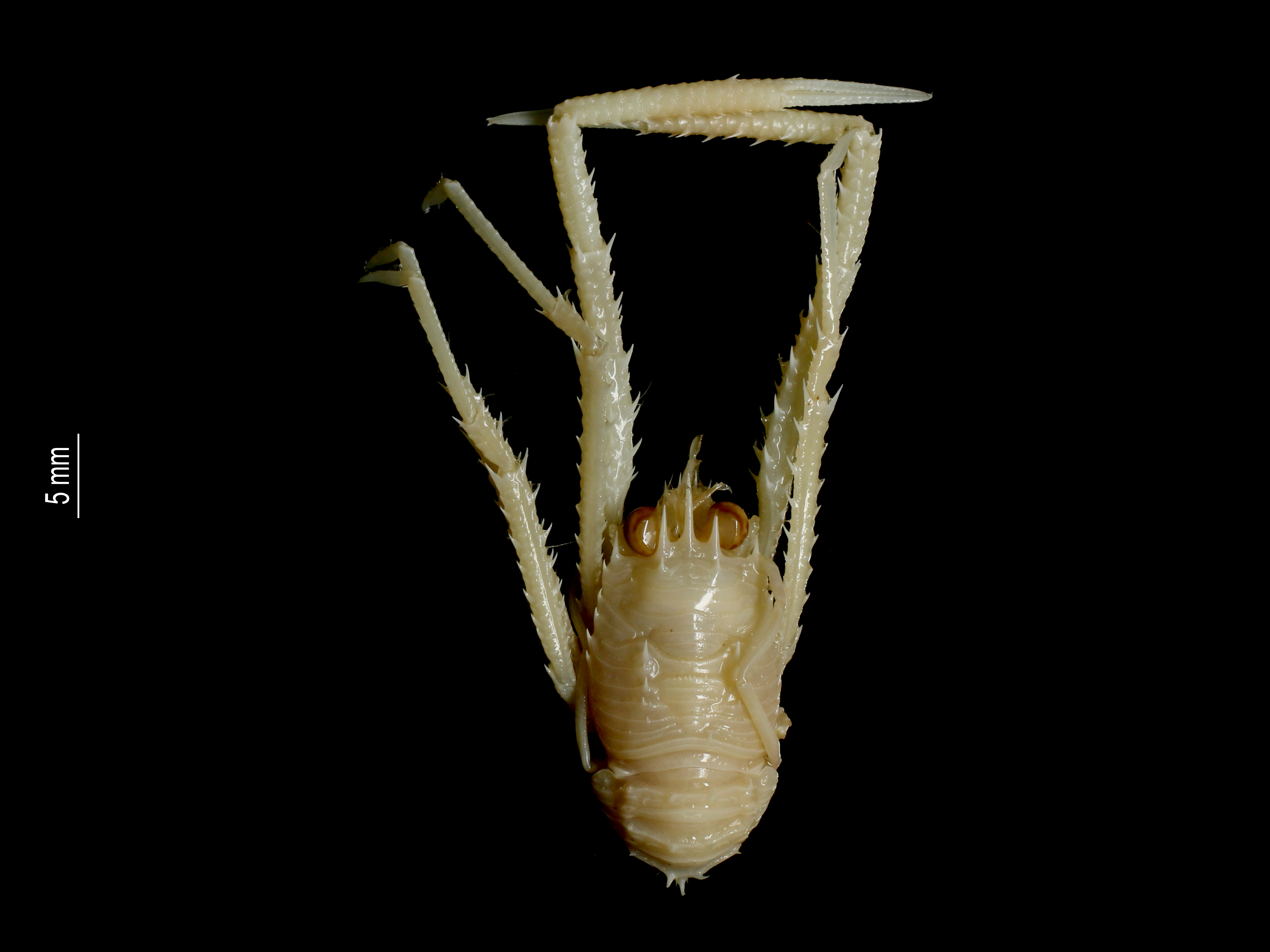

Scientific classification
- Kingdom: Animalia
- Phylum: Arthropoda
- Class: Malacostraca
- Order: Decapoda
- Suborder: Pleocyemata
- Infraorder: Anomura
- Family: Munididae
- Genus: Garymunida
- Species: G. simillima

Binomial name
- Garymunida simillima (Macpherson, 2006)

Synonyms
- Agononida simillima Macpherson, 2006

= Garymunida simillima =

Species of crustacean

Garymunida simillima is a species of squat lobster in the family Munididae. It occurs in French Polynesia (South Pacific Ocean). The specific name is derived from the Latin similis, which refers to its similarity to Agononida normani (=Garymunida normani). The males measure from 12.4 to 13.5 millimetres (0.49 to 0.53 in) and the females from 4.6 to 14.6 millimetres (0.18 to 0.57 in). It is found off of the Austral Islands, at depths between 200 and 1,000 metres (660 and 3,280 ft).
