= Garymunida imitata =

Scientific classification
- Kingdom: Animalia
- Phylum: Arthropoda
- Class: Malacostraca
- Order: Decapoda
- Suborder: Pleocyemata
- Infraorder: Anomura
- Family: Munididae
- Genus: Garymunida
- Species: G. imitata

Binomial name
- Garymunida imitata (Macpherson, 2006)

Synonyms
- Agononida imitata Macpherson, 2006

Species of crustacean

Garymunida imitata is a species of squat lobster in the family Munididae. It occurs in French Polynesia (South Pacific Ocean). The specific name is derived from the Latin word imitatus, meaning "copy" or "mimic," which is in reference to its similarity to Agononida soelae (=Garymunida soelae).
