= Garymunida procera =

Scientific classification
- Kingdom: Animalia
- Phylum: Arthropoda
- Clade: Pancrustacea
- Class: Malacostraca
- Order: Decapoda
- Suborder: Pleocyemata
- Infraorder: Anomura
- Family: Munididae
- Genus: Garymunida
- Species: G. procera

Binomial name
- Garymunida procera (Ahyong & Poore, 2004)

Synonyms
- Agononida procera Ahyong & Poore, 2004

Species of crustacean

Garymunida procera is a species of squat lobster in the family Munididae, and was first described by Shane Ahyong and Gary Poore in 2004. The specific name is derived from procerus, a Latin word meaning "slender", which is in reference to its slender cheliped that distinguish it from the similar Agononida soelae (now Garymunida soelae). The females measure from 14.3 to 21.4 millimetres (0.56 to 0.84 in). It is found off of Eastern Australia and New Caledonia and near the Lord Howe Rise, where it is found at depths from 450 to 960 metres (1,480 to 3,150 ft).
