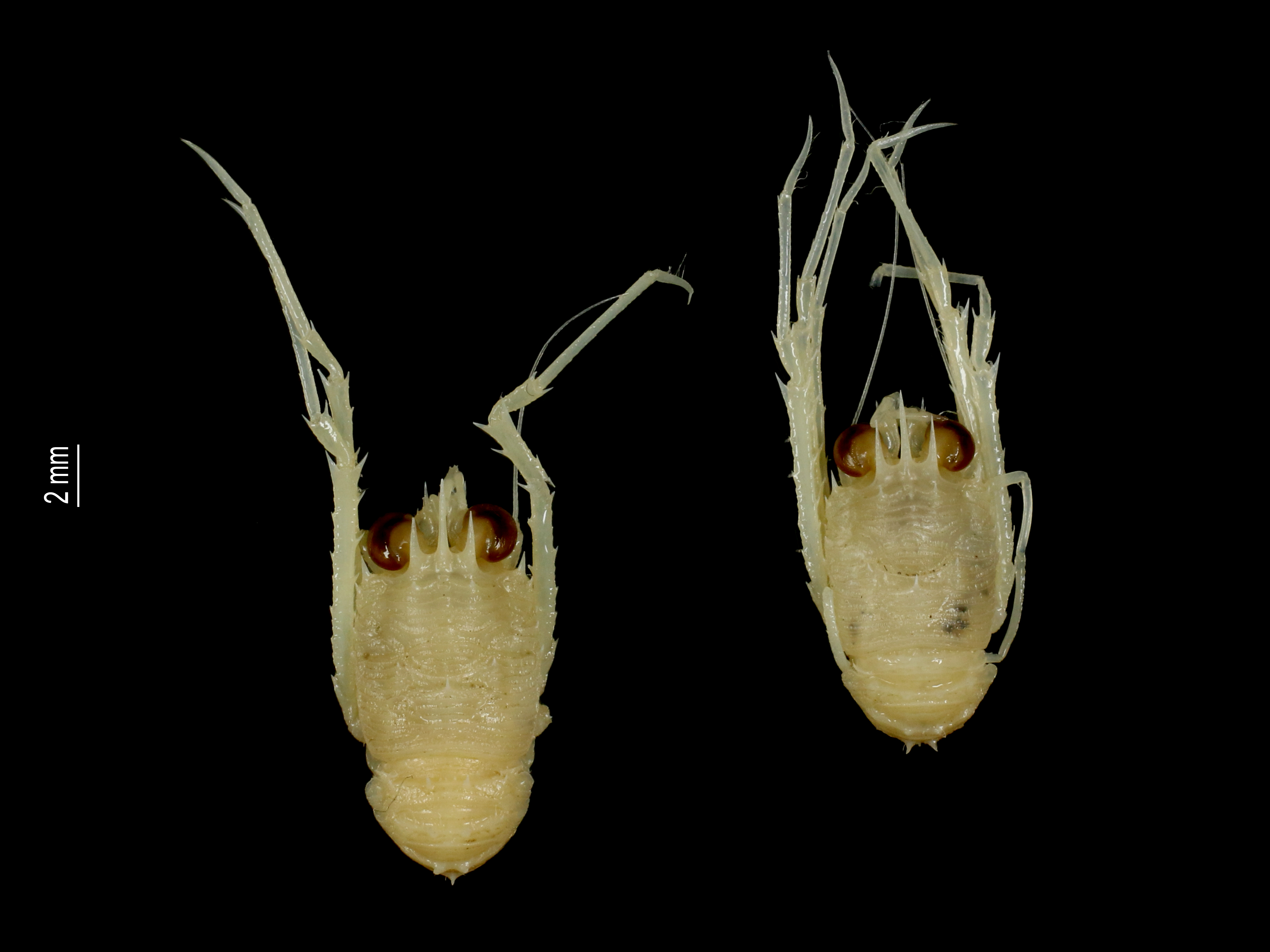
- Preserved specimen of Garymunida isabelensis

Scientific classification
- Kingdom: Animalia
- Phylum: Arthropoda
- Class: Malacostraca
- Order: Decapoda
- Suborder: Pleocyemata
- Infraorder: Anomura
- Family: Munididae
- Genus: Garymunida
- Species: G. isabelensis

Binomial name
- Garymunida isabelensis (Cabezas, Macpherson, and Machordom, 2009)

Synonyms
- Agononida isabelensis Cabezas, Macpherson & Machordom, 2009

= Garymunida isabelensis =

Species of crustacean

Garymunida isabelensis is a species of squat lobster in the family Munididae. The species name is from Isabel, one of the Solomon Islands. The males measure from 6.8 to 20.7 millimetres (0.27 to 0.81 in) and the females from 5.7 to 31.5 millimetres (0.22 to 1.24 in). It is found off of the Solomon Islands, as the specific epithet implies. It is found at depths between about 240 and 350 metres (790 and 1,150 ft).
