= Garymunida prolixa =

Scientific classification
- Domain: Eukaryota
- Kingdom: Animalia
- Phylum: Arthropoda
- Class: Malacostraca
- Order: Decapoda
- Suborder: Pleocyemata
- Infraorder: Anomura
- Family: Munididae
- Genus: Garymunida
- Species: G. prolixa

Binomial name
- Garymunida prolixa (Alcock, 1894)

Synonyms
- Munida squamosa var. prolixa Alcock, 1894; Agononida prolixa (Alcock, 1894)

Species of crustacean

Garymunida prolixa is a species of squat lobster in the family Munididae. It can be found in the Andaman and Arabian Seas, at depths between about 240 and 750 metres (790 and 2,460 ft).
