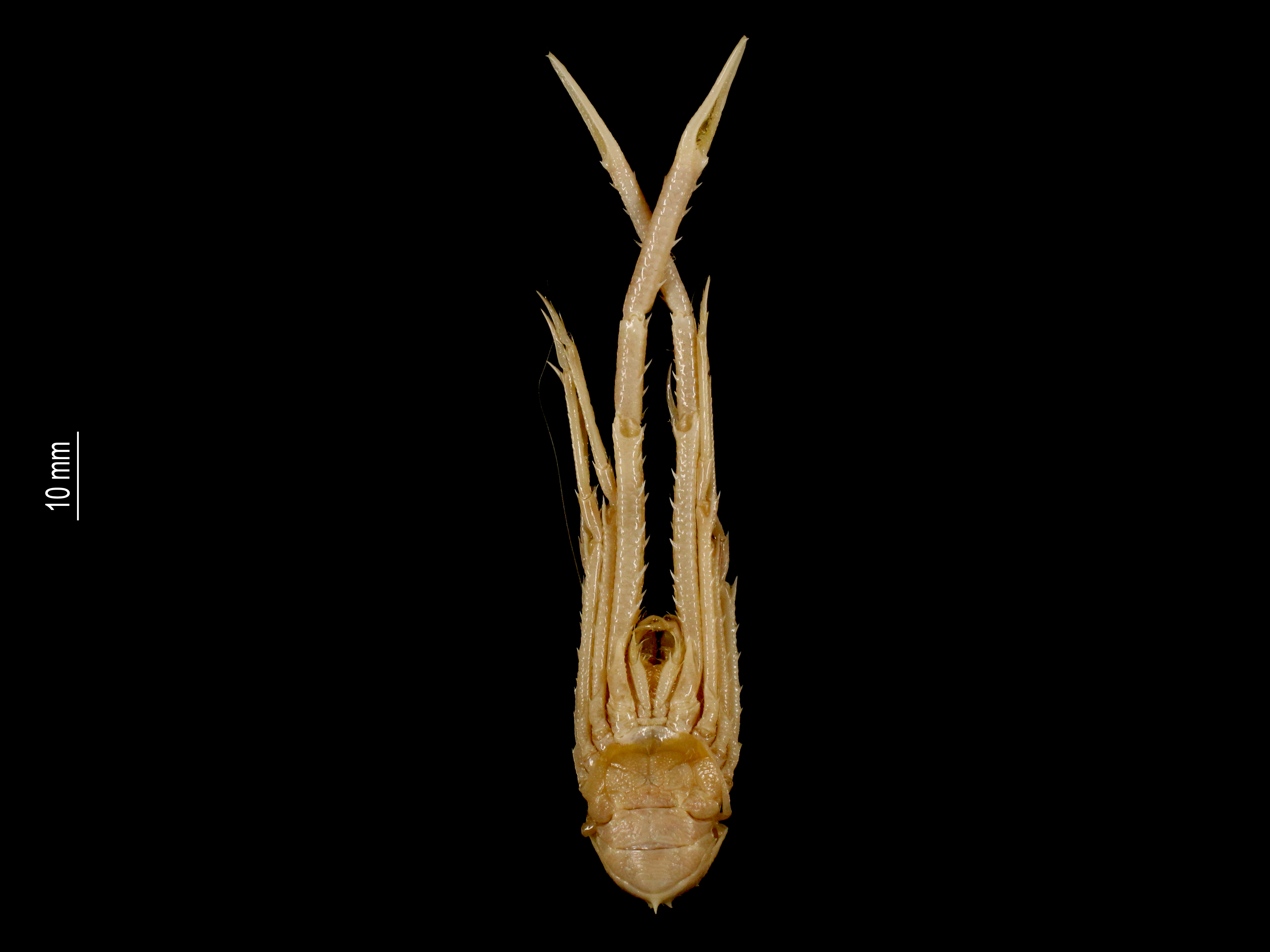

Scientific classification
- Kingdom: Animalia
- Phylum: Arthropoda
- Class: Malacostraca
- Order: Decapoda
- Suborder: Pleocyemata
- Infraorder: Anomura
- Family: Munididae
- Genus: Garymunida
- Species: G. garciai

Binomial name
- Garymunida garciai (Macpherson, 2004)

Synonyms
- Agononida garciai Macpherson, 2004

= Garymunida garciai =

Species of crustacean

Garymunida garciai is a species of squat lobster in the family Munididae. It occurs in the western Pacific Ocean near New Guinea and Fiji. The specific name is in reference to Antoni García Rubies.
