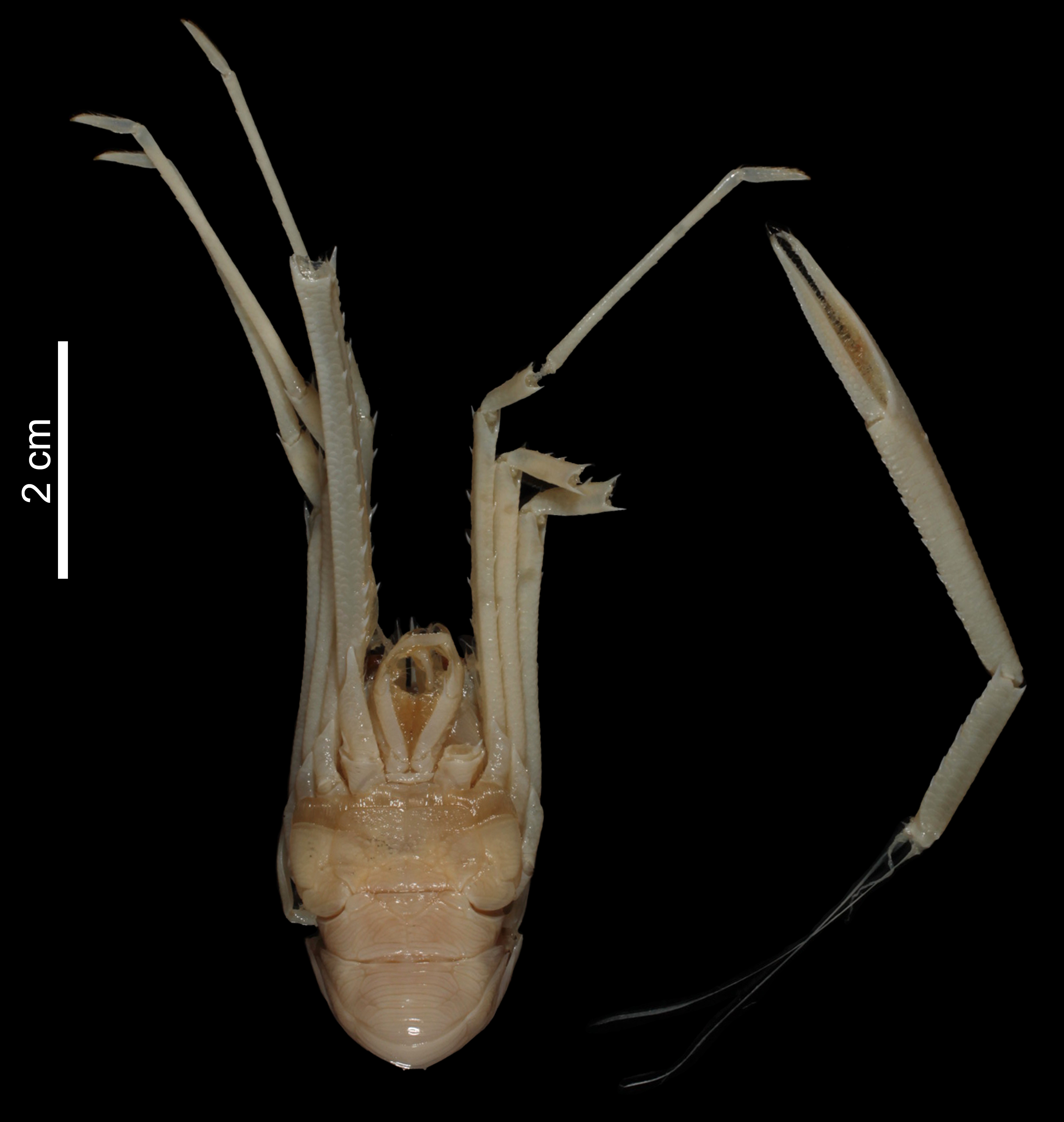
- Hexamunida sphecia

Scientific classification
- Kingdom: Animalia
- Phylum: Arthropoda
- Clade: Pancrustacea
- Class: Malacostraca
- Order: Decapoda
- Suborder: Pleocyemata
- Infraorder: Anomura
- Family: Munididae
- Genus: Hexamunida; Macpherson & Baba, 2022

= Hexamunida =

Genus of crustaceans

Hexamunida is a genus of squat lobsters in the family Munididae. It was erected in 2022 when the then paraphyletic Agononida was divided into three lineages: Agononida sensu stricto and two new genera, Garymunida and Hexamunida. The genus name refers to the number of spines (six) along the anterior ridge of the second abdominal somite, whereas these spines number four in Agononida.

Hexamunida is distributed in the western Pacific Ocean.

== Species ==
There are two recognized species:

- Hexamunida sphecia (Macpherson, 1994)
- Hexamunida tenuipes (Miyake & Baba, 1967)
