= Agononida spinicordata =

Scientific classification
- Domain: Eukaryota
- Kingdom: Animalia
- Phylum: Arthropoda
- Class: Malacostraca
- Order: Decapoda
- Suborder: Pleocyemata
- Infraorder: Anomura
- Family: Munididae
- Genus: Agononida
- Species: A. spinicordata

Binomial name
- Agononida spinicordata (Henderson, 1885)

Species of crustacean

Agononida spinicordata is a species of squat lobster in the family Munididae, which is found off of the Fiji Islands, at a depth of about 390 metres (1,280 ft).
