= Agononida fortiantennata =

Scientific classification
- Kingdom: Animalia
- Phylum: Arthropoda
- Clade: Pancrustacea
- Class: Malacostraca
- Order: Decapoda
- Suborder: Pleocyemata
- Infraorder: Anomura
- Family: Munididae
- Genus: Agononida
- Species: A. fortiantennata

Binomial name
- Agononida fortiantennata (Baba, 1988)

Species of crustacean

Agononida fortiantennata is a species of squat lobster in the family Munididae. It is found in the Moluccas off of the west coast of the Philippines and in Vanuatu. It can usually be found at depths from 750 to 1,190 metres (2,460 to 3,900 ft).
