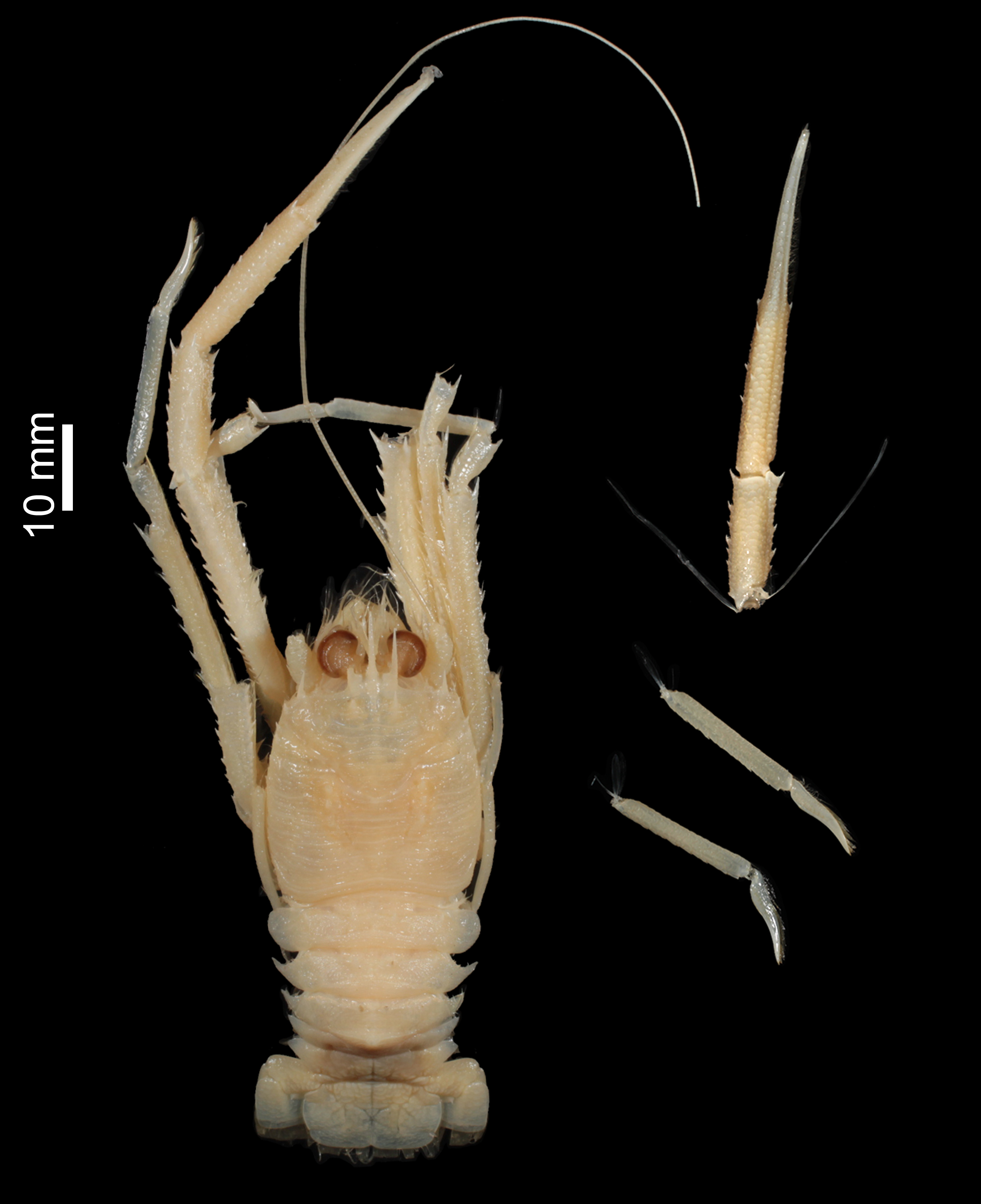
- Agononida africerta

Scientific classification
- Kingdom: Animalia
- Phylum: Arthropoda
- Clade: Pancrustacea
- Class: Malacostraca
- Order: Decapoda
- Suborder: Pleocyemata
- Infraorder: Anomura
- Family: Munididae
- Genus: Agononida; Baba & de Saint Laurent, 1996

= Agononida =

Genus of crustaceans

Agononida is a genus of squat lobsters in the family Munididae. In 2022, recognizing that the genus as then defined was paraphyletic, it was divided into three lineages: Agononida sensu stricto and two new genera, Garymunida and Hexamunida. Agononida is distributed in the Indian and Pacific Oceans.

== Species ==
There are 20 recognized species:

- Agononida africerta Poore & Andreakis, 2012
- Agononida alisae Macpherson, 1999
- Agononida andrewi (Macpherson, 1994)
- Agononida auscerta Poore & Andreakis, 2012
- Agononida callirrhoe (Macpherson, 1994)
- Agononida eminens (Baba, 1988)
- Agononida emphereia Macpherson, 1997
- Agononida fortiantennata (Baba, 1988)
- Agononida incerta (Henderson, 1888)
- Agononida indocerta Poore & Andreakis, 2012
- Agononida madagascerta Poore & Andreakis, 2014
- Agononida marini (Macpherson, 1994)
- Agononida norfocerta Poore & Andreakis, 2012
- Agononida polycerta Poore & Andreakis, 2014
- Agononida rubrizonata Macpherson & Baba, 2009
- Agononida sinensis (Zong & Wang, 1989)
- Agononida spinicordata (Henderson, 1885)
- Agononida tasmancerta Poore & Andreakis, 2014
- Agononida vanuacerta Poore & Andreakis, 2014
- Agononida variabilis (Baba, 1988)
