= Garymunida longipes =

Scientific classification
- Kingdom: Animalia
- Phylum: Arthropoda
- Clade: Pancrustacea
- Class: Malacostraca
- Order: Decapoda
- Suborder: Pleocyemata
- Infraorder: Anomura
- Family: Munididae
- Genus: Garymunida
- Species: G. longipes

Binomial name
- Garymunida longipes (A. Milne Edwards, 1880)

Synonyms
- Munida longipes A. Milne-Edwards, 1880; Agononida longipes (A. Milne-Edwards, 1880); Munida paynei Boone, 1927

Species of crustacean

Garymunida longipes is a species of squat lobster in the family Munididae. It occurs in the western Atlantic Ocean.
