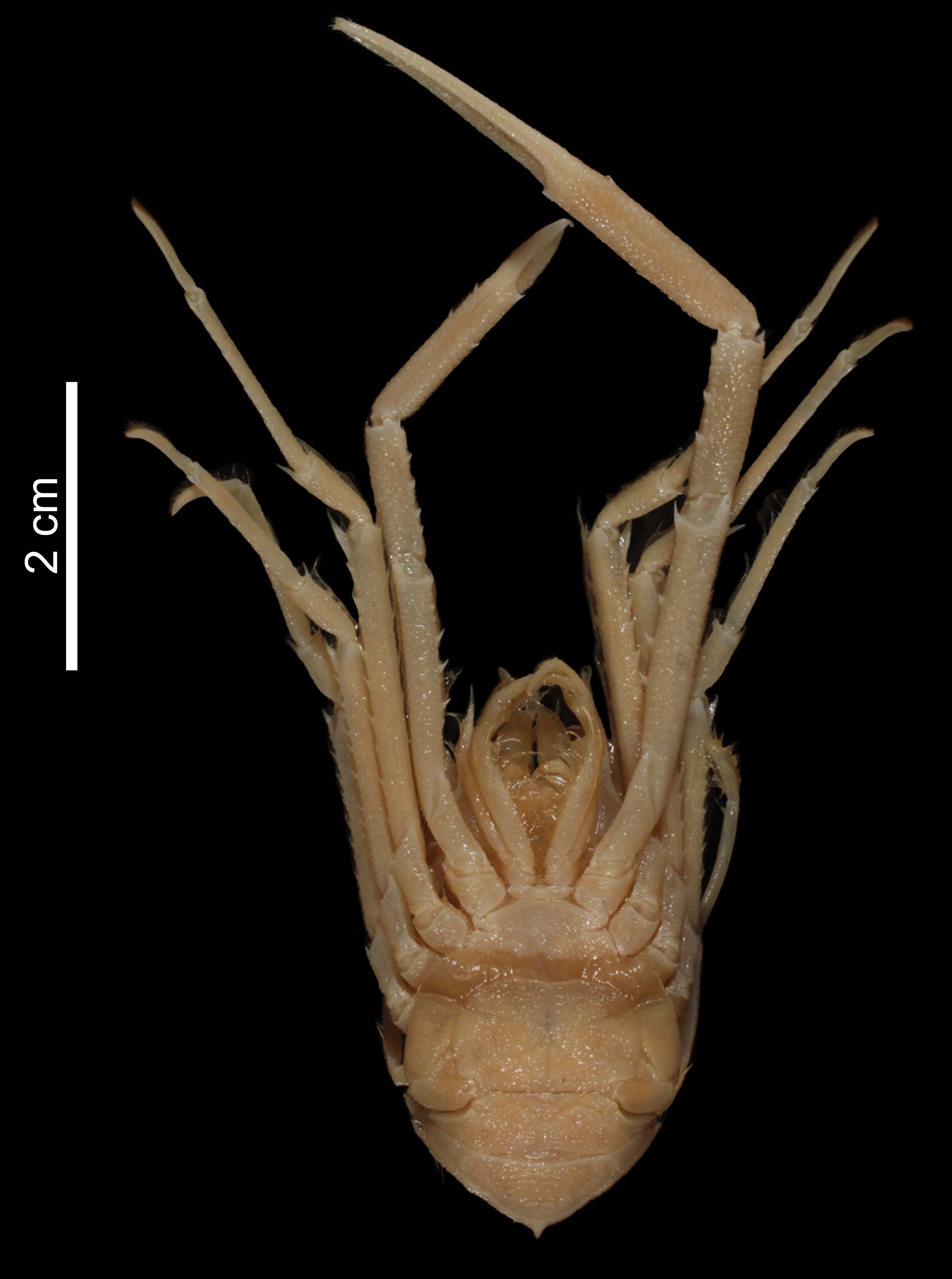

Scientific classification
- Kingdom: Animalia
- Phylum: Arthropoda
- Class: Malacostraca
- Order: Decapoda
- Suborder: Pleocyemata
- Infraorder: Anomura
- Family: Munididae
- Genus: Agononida
- Species: A. emphereia

Binomial name
- Agononida emphereia Macpherson, 1997

= Agononida emphereia =

Species of crustacean

Agononida emphereia is a species of squat lobster in the family Munididae. The species name is derived from the Latin word empheria, meaning "likeness," which is in reference to how similar it is to closely related species.
