= Garymunida schroederi =

Scientific classification
- Domain: Eukaryota
- Kingdom: Animalia
- Phylum: Arthropoda
- Class: Malacostraca
- Order: Decapoda
- Suborder: Pleocyemata
- Infraorder: Anomura
- Family: Munididae
- Genus: Garymunida
- Species: G. schroederi

Binomial name
- Garymunida schroederi (Chace, 1939)

Synonyms
- Munida schroederi Chace, 1939; Agononida schroederi (Chace, 1939)

Species of crustacean

Garymunida schroederi is a species of squat lobster in the family Munididae. It is found off of the Bahamas and Cuba, at depths ranging from 275 to 495 metres (902 to 1,624 ft).
