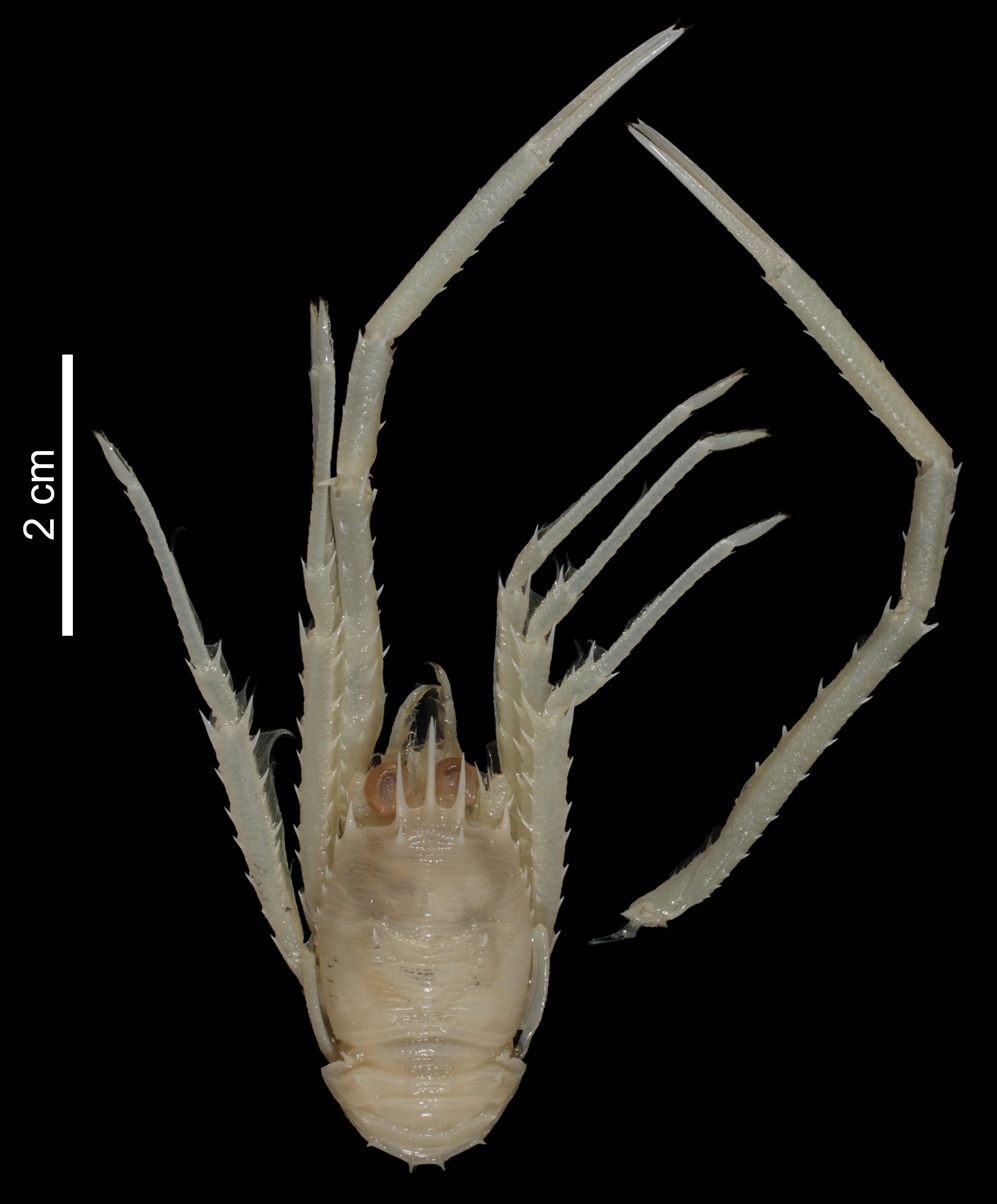
- Garymunida laurentae

Scientific classification
- Kingdom: Animalia
- Phylum: Arthropoda
- Clade: Pancrustacea
- Class: Malacostraca
- Order: Decapoda
- Suborder: Pleocyemata
- Infraorder: Anomura
- Family: Munididae
- Genus: Garymunida; Macpherson & Baba, 2022

Type species
- Munida laurentae Macpherson, 1994

= Garymunida =

Genus of crustaceans

Garymunida is a genus of squat lobsters in the family Munididae. It was erected in 2022 when the then paraphyletic Agononida was divided into three lineages: Agononida sensu stricto and two new genera, Garymunida and Hexamunida. The genus name honors Gary Poore, acknowledging his "significant contributions to the study of the Galatheoidea and other crustaceans".

Garymunida is primarily distributed in the Indian and Pacific Oceans, but two species (G. schroederi and G. longipes) occur in the western Atlantic Ocean.

== Species ==
There are 20 recognized species:

- Garymunida aequabilis (Macpherson, 2006)
- Garymunida analoga (Macpherson, 1993)
- Garymunida garciai (Macpherson, 2004)
- Garymunida imitata (Macpherson, 2006)
- Garymunida isabelensis (Cabezas, Macpherson & Machordom, 2009)
- Garymunida laurentae (Macpherson, 1994)
- Garymunida longipes (A. Milne Edwards, 1880)
- Garymunida longispinata (Baba, 1988)
- Garymunida nielbrucei (Vereshchaka, 2005)
- Garymunida normani (Henderson, 1885)
- Garymunida ocyrhoe (Macpherson, 1994)
- Garymunida pilosimanus (Baba, 1969)
- Garymunida procera (Ahyong & Poore, 2004)
- Garymunida prolixa (Alcock, 1894)
- Garymunida sabatesae (Macpherson, 1994)
- Garymunida schroederi (Chace, 1939)
- Garymunida similis (Baba, 1988)
- Garymunida simillima (Macpherson, 2006)
- Garymunida soelae (Baba, 1986)
- Garymunida squamosa (Henderson, 1885)
