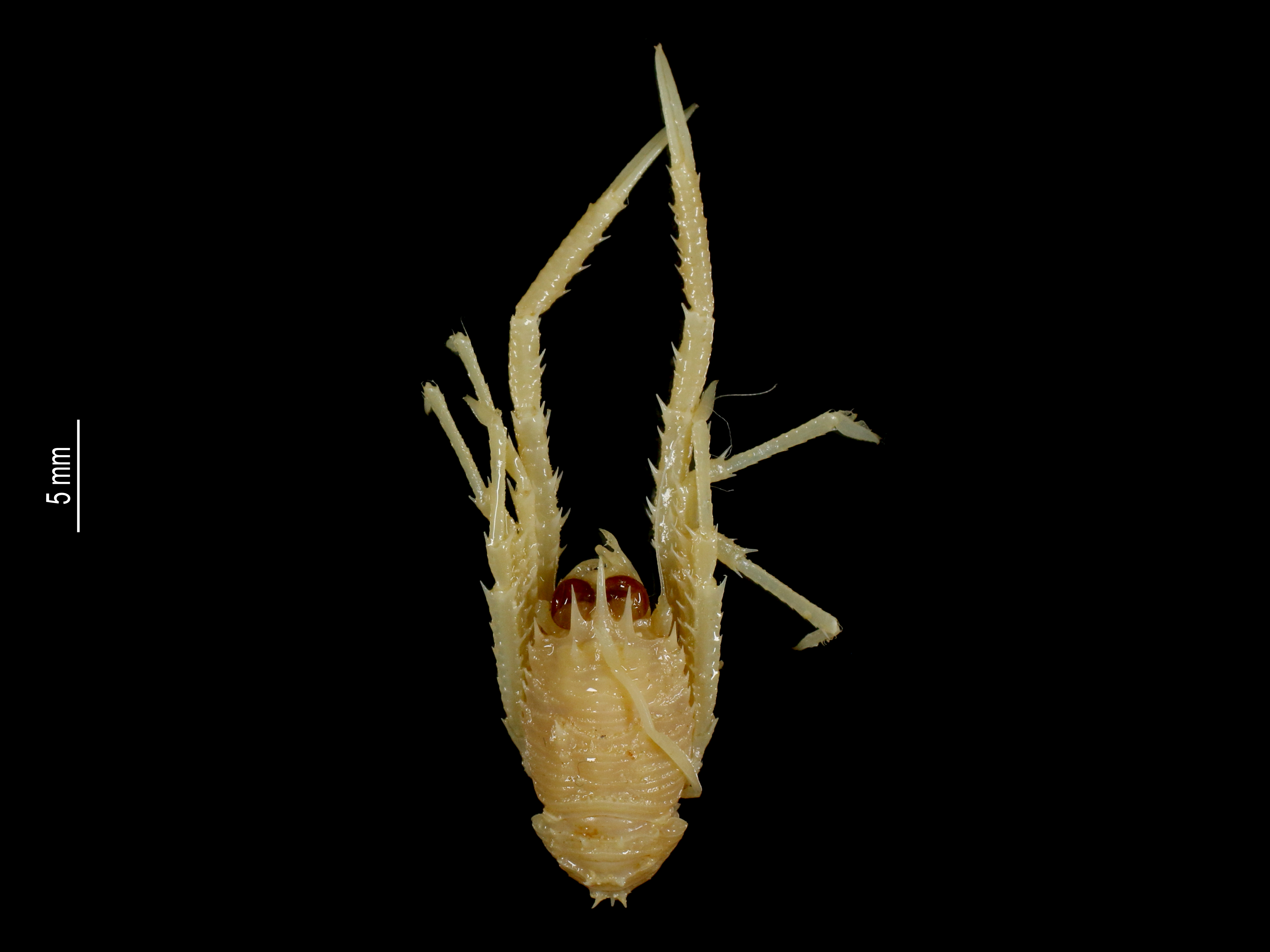

Scientific classification
- Kingdom: Animalia
- Phylum: Arthropoda
- Class: Malacostraca
- Order: Decapoda
- Suborder: Pleocyemata
- Infraorder: Anomura
- Family: Munididae
- Genus: Agononida
- Species: A. andrewi

Binomial name
- Agononida andrewi (Macpherson, 1994)

= Agononida andrewi =

Species of crustacean

Agononida andrewi is a species of squat lobster in the family Munididae. The species is named after Andrew I. L. Payne, a marine scientist.
