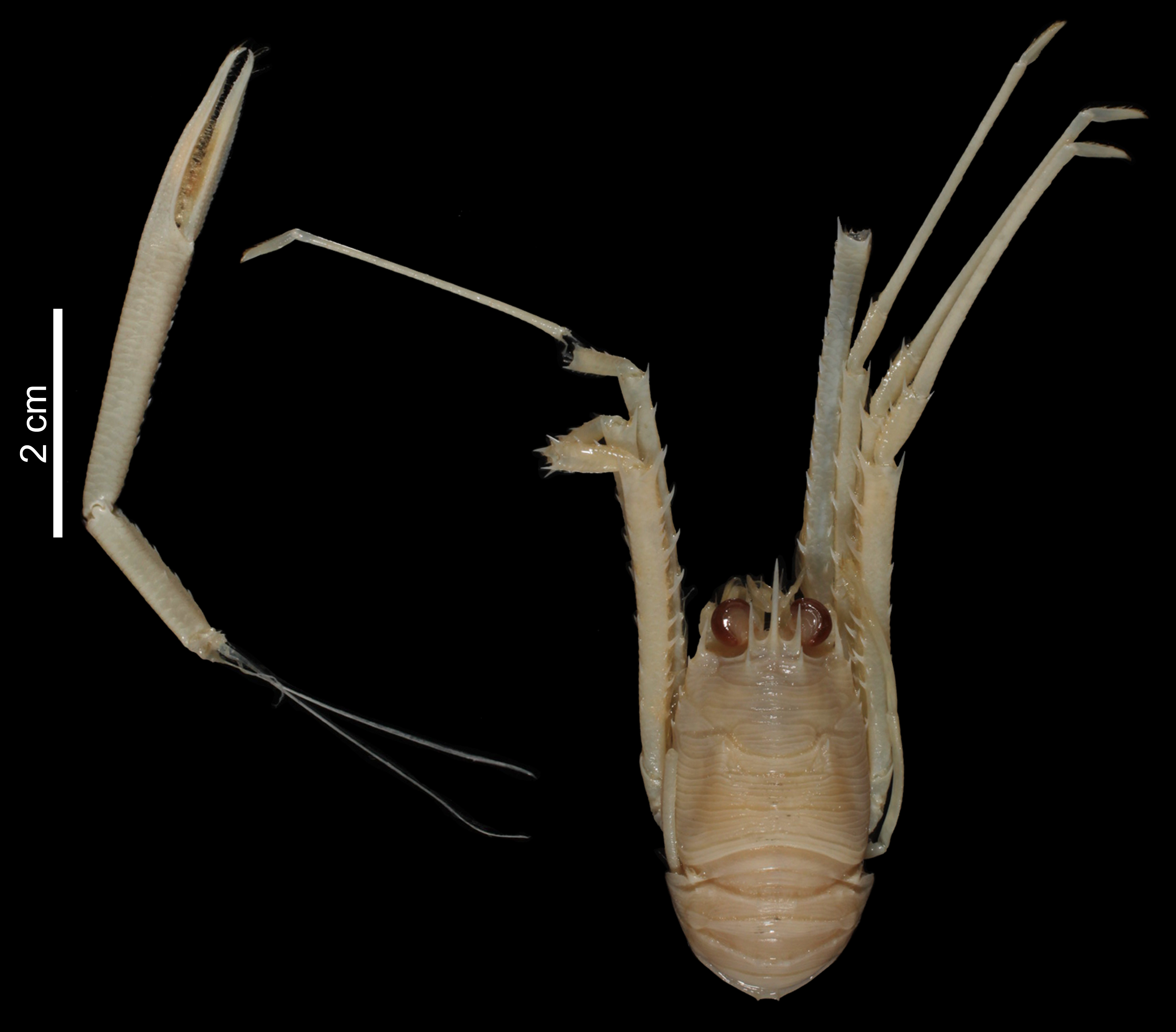

Scientific classification
- Kingdom: Animalia
- Phylum: Arthropoda
- Class: Malacostraca
- Order: Decapoda
- Suborder: Pleocyemata
- Infraorder: Anomura
- Family: Munididae
- Genus: Hexamunida
- Species: H. sphecia

Binomial name
- Hexamunida sphecia (Macpherson, 1994)

Synonyms
- Munida sphecia Macpherson, 1994; Agononida sphecia (Macpherson, 1994)

= Hexamunida sphecia =

Species of crustacean

Hexamunida sphecia is a species of squat lobster in the family Munididae. The species name is derived from the Greek sphex, meaning "wasp," which refers to the yellow and purple bands on its carapace. The males measure from 5.0 to 24.0 millimetres (0.20 to 0.94 in) and the females from 6.0 to 17.1 millimetres (0.24 to 0.67 in). It is found off of New Caledonia, the Loyalty Islands, and the Chesterfield Islands, at depths between about 60 and 520 metres (200 and 1,710 ft). It is also found off of both Fiji and Tonga, where it resides between depths of about 310 and 465 metres (1,017 and 1,526 ft).
