= Hexamunida tenuipes =

Scientific classification
- Kingdom: Animalia
- Phylum: Arthropoda
- Clade: Pancrustacea
- Class: Malacostraca
- Order: Decapoda
- Suborder: Pleocyemata
- Infraorder: Anomura
- Family: Munididae
- Genus: Hexamunida
- Species: H. tenuipes

Binomial name
- Hexamunida tenuipes (Miyake & Baba, 1967)

Synonyms
- Munida tenuipes Miyake & Baba, 1967; Agononida tenuipes (Miyake & Baba, 1967)

Species of crustacean

Hexamunida tenuipes is a species of squat lobster in the family Munididae. It is found off of Japan.
