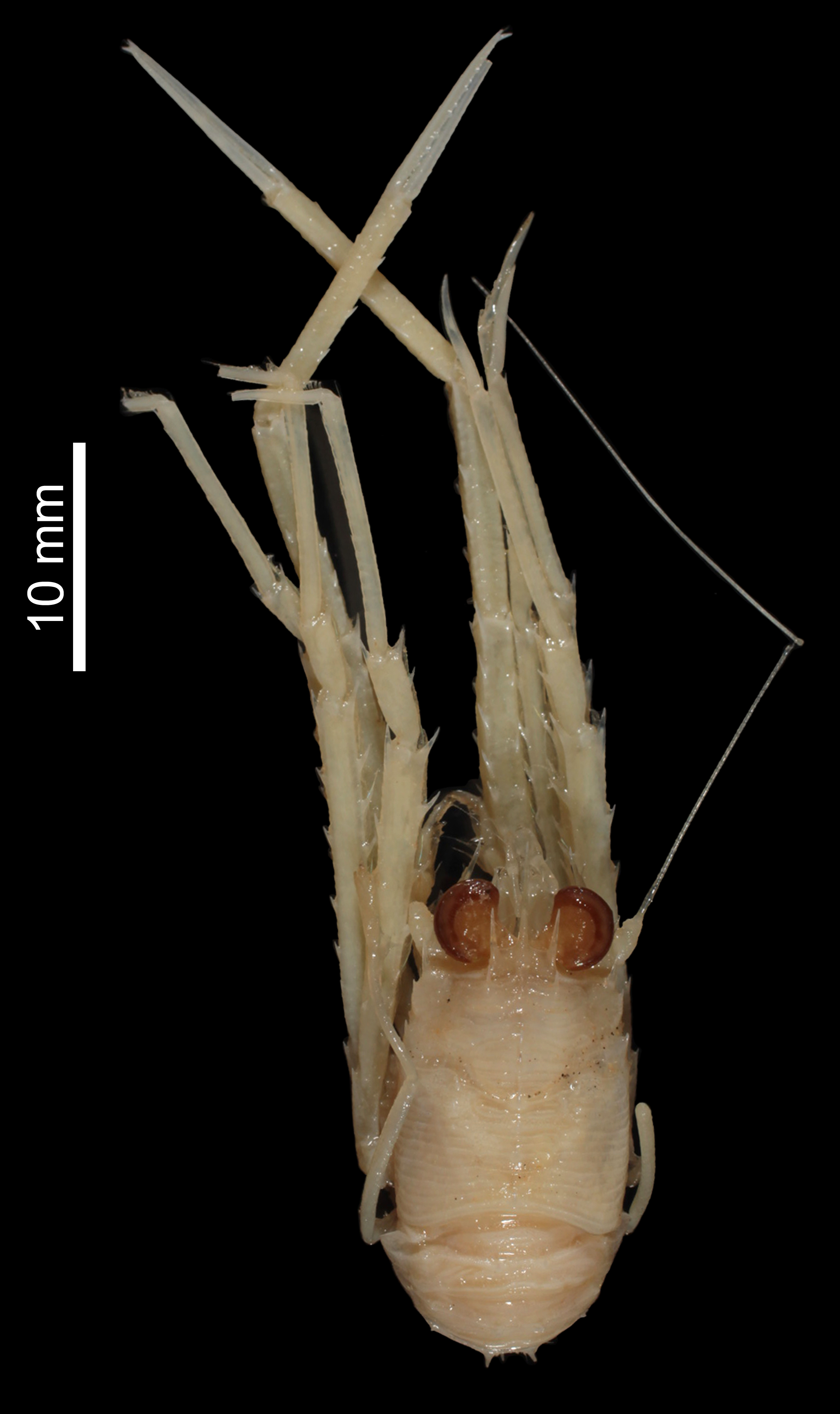

Scientific classification
- Kingdom: Animalia
- Phylum: Arthropoda
- Class: Malacostraca
- Order: Decapoda
- Suborder: Pleocyemata
- Infraorder: Anomura
- Family: Munididae
- Genus: Agononida
- Species: A. alisae

Binomial name
- Agononida alisae Macpherson, 1999

= Agononida alisae =

Species of crustacean

Agononida alisae is a species of squat lobster in the family Munididae. The species name is derived from the research vessel that collected the type specimen. The research vessel it was collected on was named "Alis".
