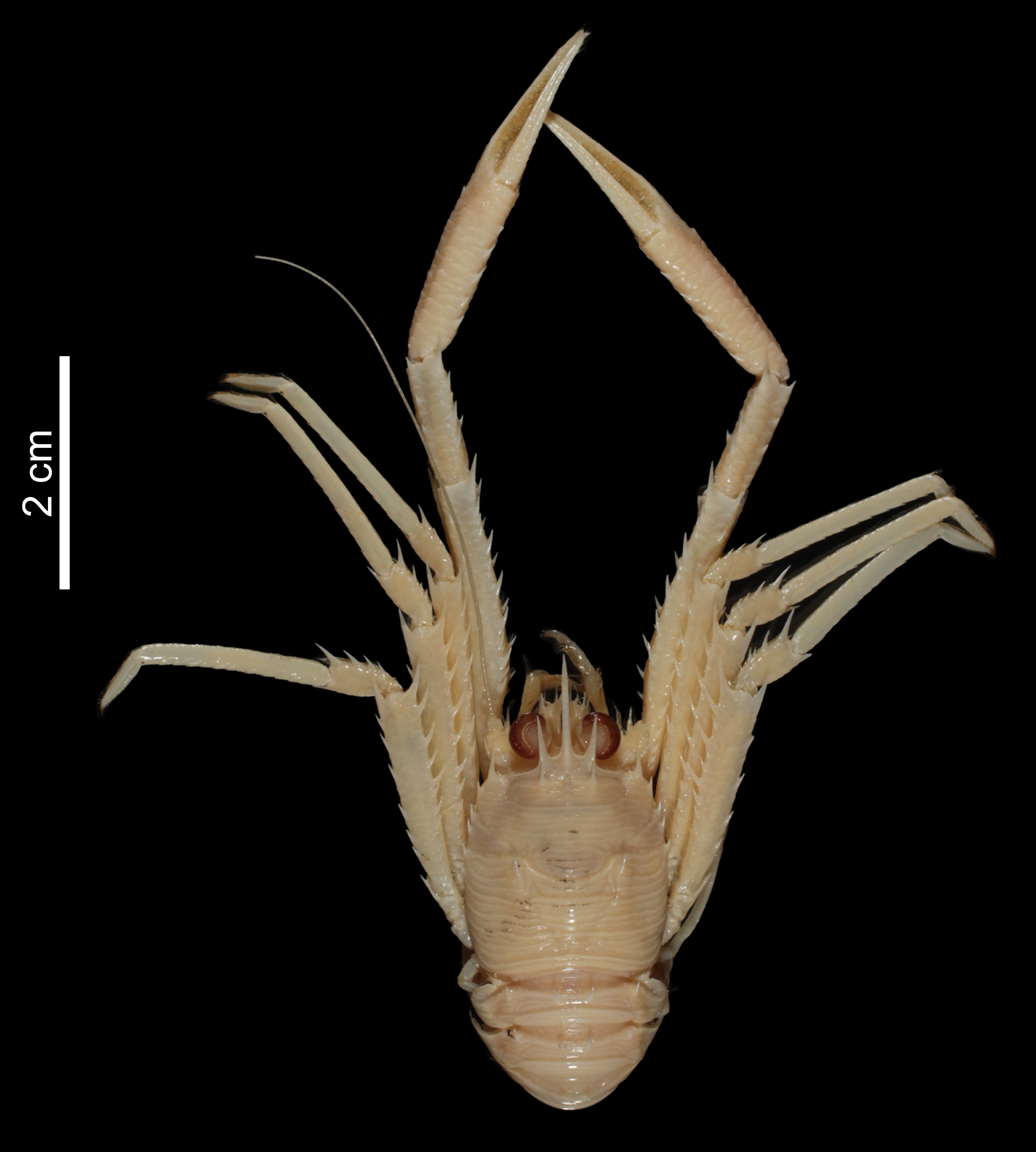

Scientific classification
- Kingdom: Animalia
- Phylum: Arthropoda
- Class: Malacostraca
- Order: Decapoda
- Suborder: Pleocyemata
- Infraorder: Anomura
- Family: Munididae
- Genus: Garymunida
- Species: G. sabatesae

Binomial name
- Garymunida sabatesae (Macpherson, 1994)

Synonyms
- Munida sabatesae Macpherson, 1994; Agononida sabatesae (Macpherson, 1994)

= Garymunida sabatesae =

Species of crustacean

Garymunida sabatesae is a species of squat lobster in the family Munididae. The specific name is dedicated to A. Sabates. The males measure from 8.7 to 21.6 millimetres (0.34 to 0.85 in) and the females from 4.9 to 10.0 millimetres (0.19 to 0.39 in). G. sabates is found off of New Caledonia and Vanuatu, at depths between 350 and 610 metres (1,150 and 2,000 ft). It is also found off of Tonga, where it resides between depths of about 370 and 530 metres (1,210 and 1,740 ft). There are no common names for Garymunida sabatesae.
