= Agononida eminens =

Scientific classification
- Kingdom: Animalia
- Phylum: Arthropoda
- Clade: Pancrustacea
- Class: Malacostraca
- Order: Decapoda
- Suborder: Pleocyemata
- Infraorder: Anomura
- Family: Munididae
- Genus: Agononida
- Species: A. eminens

Binomial name
- Agononida eminens (Baba, 1988)

Species of crustacean

Agononida eminens is a species of squat lobster in the family Munididae. It is found in the Philippines, Indonesia, and Queensland, and the islands of New Caledonia, Lifou, Wallis, and Futuna, ranging in depth from about 560 metres (1,840 ft) to about 1,000 metres (3,300 ft). The males usually range in length from 7.0 to 18.1 millimetres (0.28 to 0.71 in) and the females from 4.8 to 19.4 millimetres (0.19 to 0.76 in).
