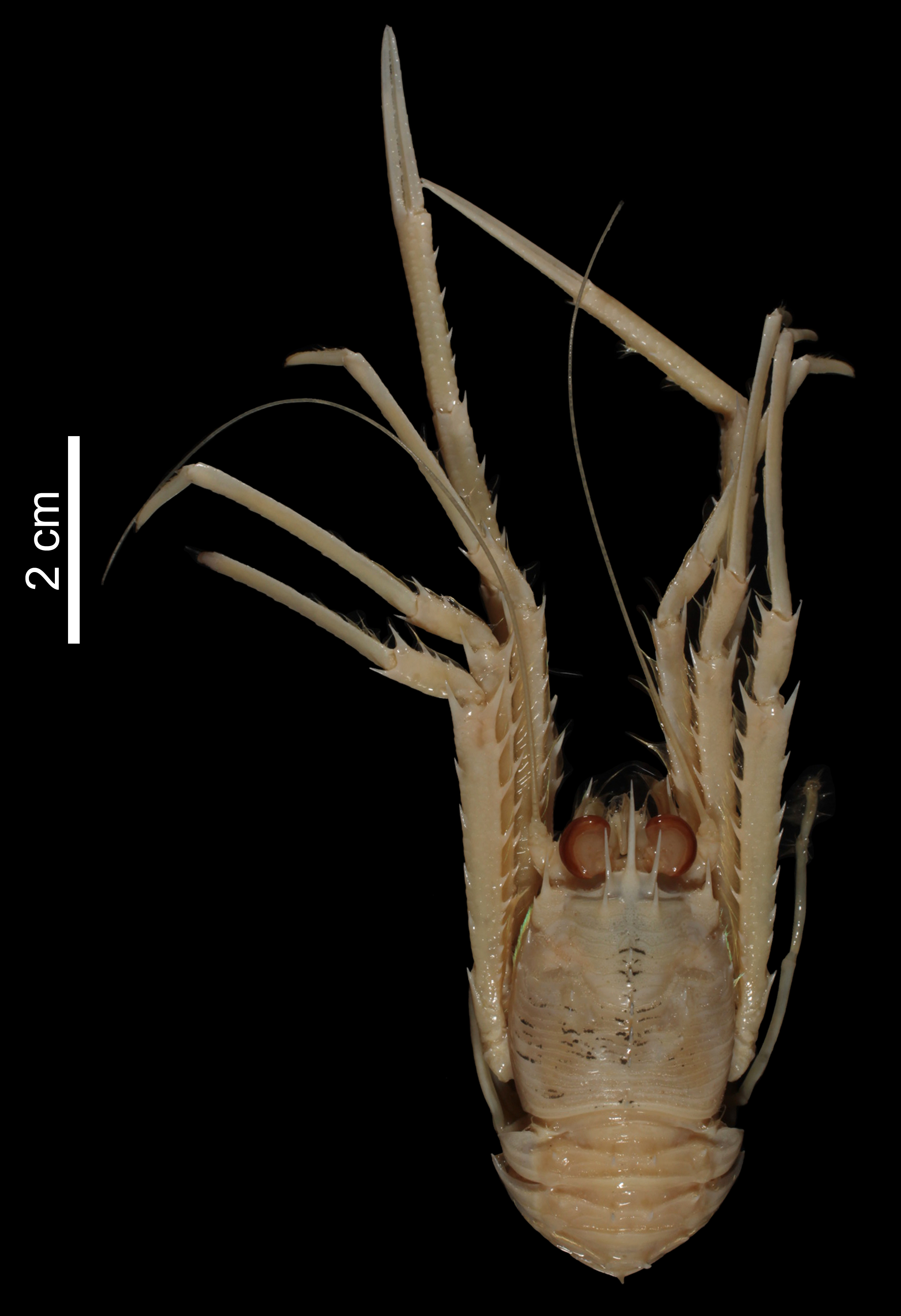

Scientific classification
- Kingdom: Animalia
- Phylum: Arthropoda
- Clade: Pancrustacea
- Class: Malacostraca
- Order: Decapoda
- Suborder: Pleocyemata
- Infraorder: Anomura
- Family: Munididae
- Genus: Agononida
- Species: A. marini

Binomial name
- Agononida marini (Macpherson, 1994)

= Agononida marini =

Species of squat lobster

Agononida marini is a species of squat lobster in the family Munididae. The species name is dedicated to Marin Manriquez. The males measure from 7.8 to 26.8 millimetres (0.31 to 1.06 in) and the females from 6.5 to 25 millimetres (0.26 to 0.98 in). It is found off New Caledonia, Loyalty Islands, Chesterfield Islands, eastern Australia, and northern New Zealand, at depths between about 460 and 600 metres (1,510 and 1,970 ft).
