= Agononida variabilis =

Scientific classification
- Kingdom: Animalia
- Phylum: Arthropoda
- Clade: Pancrustacea
- Class: Malacostraca
- Order: Decapoda
- Suborder: Pleocyemata
- Infraorder: Anomura
- Family: Munididae
- Genus: Agononida
- Species: A. variabilis

Binomial name
- Agononida variabilis (Baba, 1988)

Species of crustacean

Agononida variabilis is a species of squat lobster in the family Munididae. The males range in size from 9.7 to 19.0 millimetres (0.38 to 0.75 in) and the females from 5.8 to 19.8 millimetres (0.23 to 0.78 in). It is found both south and southwest coast of Luzon, south of Mindoro, and north of Panay, at depths ranging from about 445 to 925 metres (1,460 to 3,035 ft).
