= Garymunida ocyrhoe =

Scientific classification
- Kingdom: Animalia
- Phylum: Arthropoda
- Class: Malacostraca
- Order: Decapoda
- Suborder: Pleocyemata
- Infraorder: Anomura
- Family: Munididae
- Genus: Garymunida
- Species: G. ocyrhoe

Binomial name
- Garymunida ocyrhoe (Macpherson, 1994)

Synonyms
- Munida ocyrhoe Macpherson, 1994; Agononida ocyrhoe (Macpherson, 1994)

Species of crustacean

Garymunida ocyrhoe is a species of squat lobster in the family Munididae. The specific name is from "Ocyrhoe," one of the Oceanids in Greek mythology. The males measure from 8.2 to 28.4 millimetres (0.32 to 1.12 in) and the females from 7.6 to 29.4 millimetres (0.30 to 1.16 in). It is found off of New Caledonia, Loyalty Islands, Chesterfield Islands, Wallis and Futuna, and Vanuatu, at depths ranging from 420 to 650 metres (1,380 to 2,130 ft). It can also be found off of Fiji, at depths ranging from about 420 to 500 metres (1,380 to 1,640 ft).
