= Garymunida longispinata =

Scientific classification
- Kingdom: Animalia
- Phylum: Arthropoda
- Clade: Pancrustacea
- Class: Malacostraca
- Order: Decapoda
- Suborder: Pleocyemata
- Infraorder: Anomura
- Family: Munididae
- Genus: Garymunida
- Species: G. longispinata

Binomial name
- Garymunida longispinata (Baba, 1988)

Synonyms
- Munida longispinata Baba, 1988; Agononida longispinata (Baba, 1988)

Species of crustacean

Garymunida longispinata is a species of squat lobster in the family Munididae. The males measure from 11.7 to 20.5 millimetres (0.46 to 0.81 in) and the females from 14.5 to 22.9 millimetres (0.57 to 0.90 in). It is found off of southwestern Luzon and the east coast of Mindoro and in the Mindanao Sea.
