= Garymunida nielbrucei =

Scientific classification
- Domain: Eukaryota
- Kingdom: Animalia
- Phylum: Arthropoda
- Class: Malacostraca
- Order: Decapoda
- Suborder: Pleocyemata
- Infraorder: Anomura
- Family: Munididae
- Genus: Garymunida
- Species: G. nielbrucei

Binomial name
- Garymunida nielbrucei (Vereshchaka, 2005)

Synonyms
- Agononida nielbrucei Vereshchaka, 2005

Species of crustacean

Garymunida nielbrucei is a species of squat lobster in the family Munididae. The specific name is dedicated to Australian carcinologist Niel Bruce. The males measure from 7.7 to 25.0 millimetres (0.30 to 0.98 in) and the females from 7.7 to 27.3 millimetres (0.30 to 1.07 in). It is found off of New Zealand at depths from 260 to 470 metres (850 to 1,540 ft).
