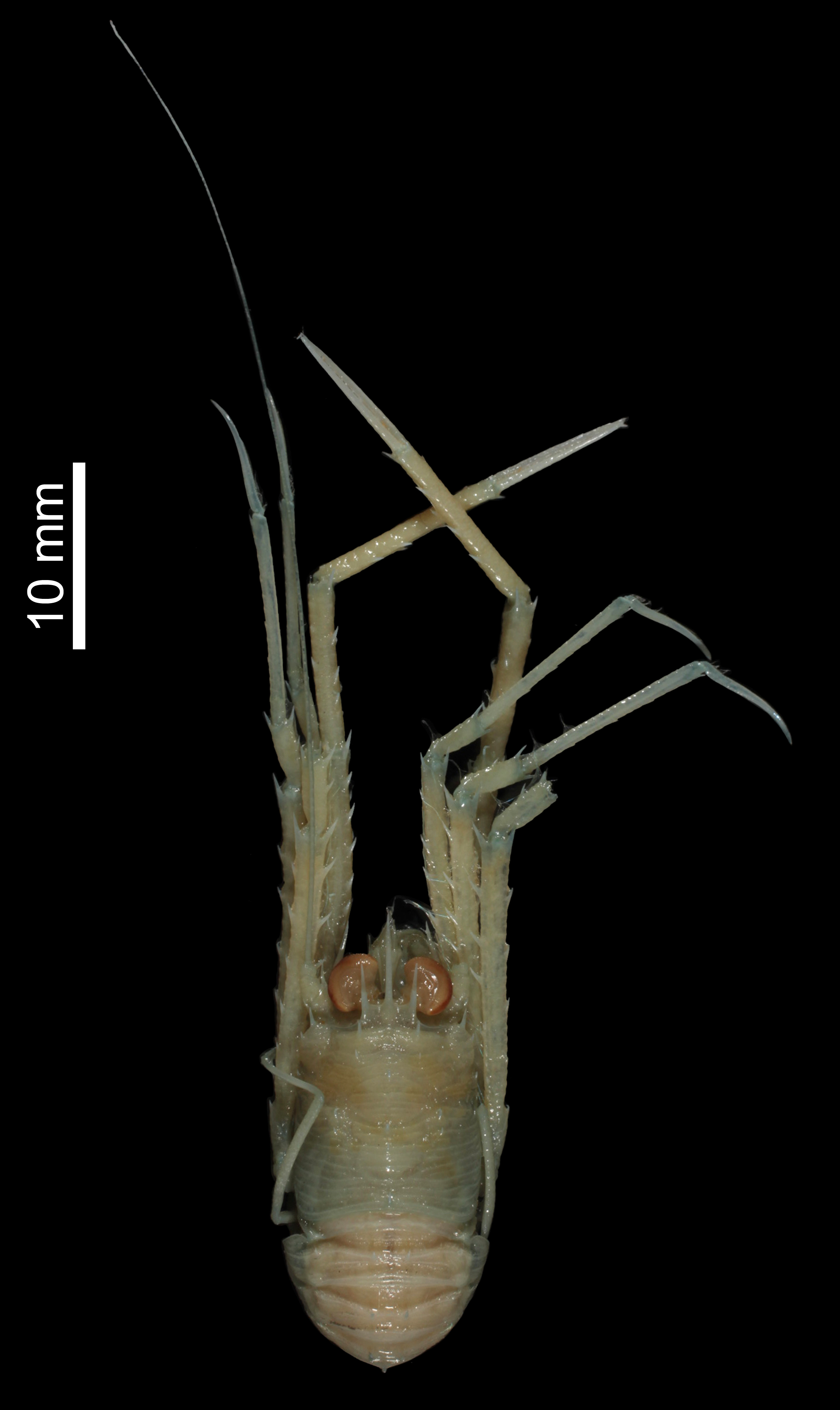

Scientific classification
- Kingdom: Animalia
- Phylum: Arthropoda
- Class: Malacostraca
- Order: Decapoda
- Suborder: Pleocyemata
- Infraorder: Anomura
- Family: Munididae
- Genus: Agononida
- Species: A. callirrhoe

Binomial name
- Agononida callirrhoe (Macpherson, 1994)

= Agononida callirrhoe =

Species of crustacean

Agononida callirrhoe is a species of squat lobster in the family Munididae. The species name is derived from Callirroe, one of the Oceanids in Greek mythology.
