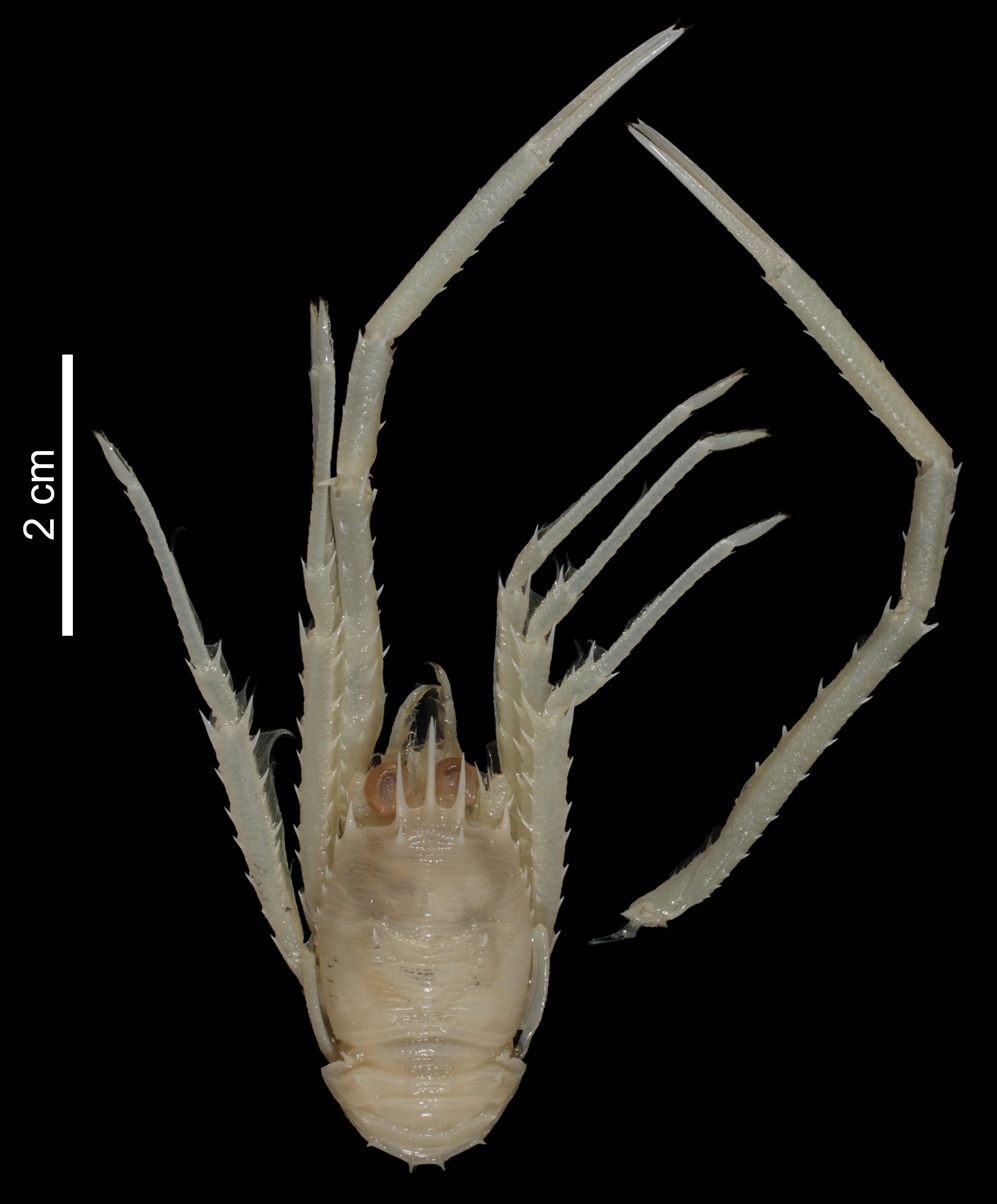

Scientific classification
- Kingdom: Animalia
- Phylum: Arthropoda
- Class: Malacostraca
- Order: Decapoda
- Suborder: Pleocyemata
- Infraorder: Anomura
- Family: Munididae
- Genus: Garymunida
- Species: G. laurentae

Binomial name
- Garymunida laurentae (Macpherson, 1994)

Synonyms
- Munida laurentae Macpherson, 1994; Agononida laurentae (Macpherson, 1994)

= Garymunida laurentae =

Species of crustacean

Garymunida laurentae is a species of squat lobster in the family Munididae. The species name is dedicated to French carcinologist Michèle de Saint Laurent. The males measure from 5.8 to 28.6 millimetres (0.23 to 1.13 in) and the females from 5.7 to 31.5 millimetres (0.22 to 1.24 in). It is found off of New Caledonia, Loyalty Islands, Chesterfield Islands, Vanuatu, and the Matthew and Hunter Islands, at depths between about 260 and 610 metres (850 and 2,000 ft). It is also found in Tonga, at depths around about 570 metres (1,870 ft).
