= Garymunida normani =

Scientific classification
- Domain: Eukaryota
- Kingdom: Animalia
- Phylum: Arthropoda
- Class: Malacostraca
- Order: Decapoda
- Suborder: Pleocyemata
- Infraorder: Anomura
- Family: Munididae
- Genus: Garymunida
- Species: G. normani

Binomial name
- Garymunida normani (Henderson, 1885)

Synonyms
- Munida normani Henderson, 1885; Agononida normani (Henderson, 1885)

Species of crustacean

Garymunida normani is a species of squat lobster in the family Munididae. The males measure from 9.7 to 18.4 millimetres (0.38 to 0.72 in) and the females from 9.0 to 13.3 millimetres (0.35 to 0.52 in). It is found off of Fiji, Tonga, New Caledonia, Wallis and Futuna, and Vanuatu, at depths of about 320 to 670 metres (1,050 to 2,200 ft). It is also known to be found off of the Tuamotu and Society Islands at depths between about 510 and 630 metres (1,670 and 2,070 ft).
