= Garymunida pilosimanus =

Scientific classification
- Kingdom: Animalia
- Phylum: Arthropoda
- Clade: Pancrustacea
- Class: Malacostraca
- Order: Decapoda
- Suborder: Pleocyemata
- Infraorder: Anomura
- Family: Munididae
- Genus: Garymunida
- Species: G. pilosimanus

Binomial name
- Garymunida pilosimanus (Baba, 1969)

Synonyms
- Munida pilosimanus Baba, 1969; Agononida pilosimanus (Baba, 1969)

Species of crustacean

Garymunida pilosimanus is a species of squat lobster in the family Munididae. The males measure 48.7 millimetres (1.92 in) on average and the females 22.9 millimetres (0.90 in) on average. It is found off of the coasts of Japan, Taiwan, and Australia, at depths between 295 and 520 metres (968 and 1,706 ft).
