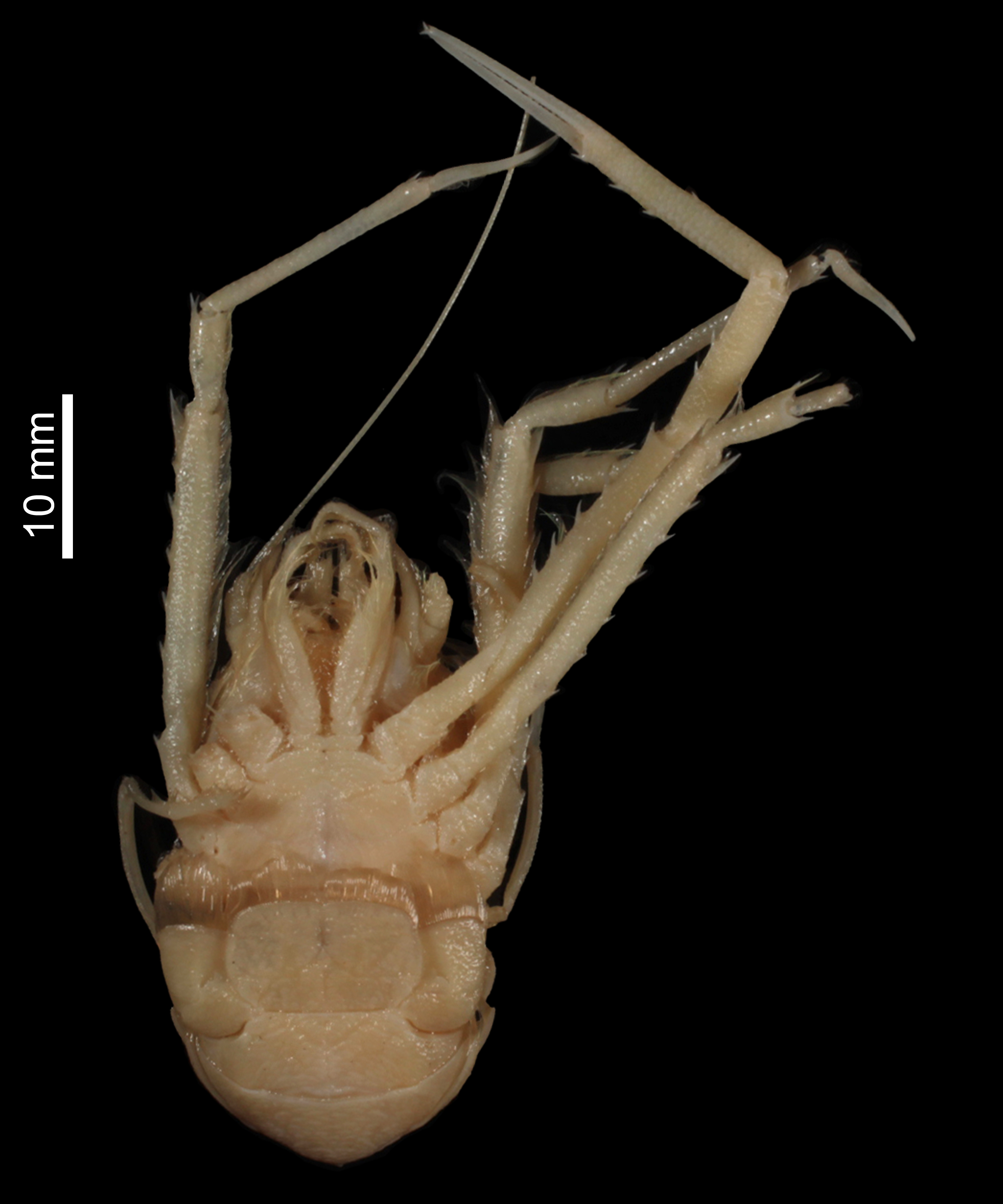
- Agononida madagascerta

Scientific classification
- Kingdom: Animalia
- Phylum: Arthropoda
- Clade: Pancrustacea
- Class: Malacostraca
- Order: Decapoda
- Suborder: Pleocyemata
- Infraorder: Anomura
- Family: Munididae
- Genus: Agononida
- Species: A. madagascerta

Binomial name
- Agononida madagascerta Poore & Andreakis, 2014

= Agononida madagascerta =

Species of crustacean

Agononida madagascerta is a species of squat lobster in the family Munididae. It is found, as the species name suggests, off the coast of Madagascar.
