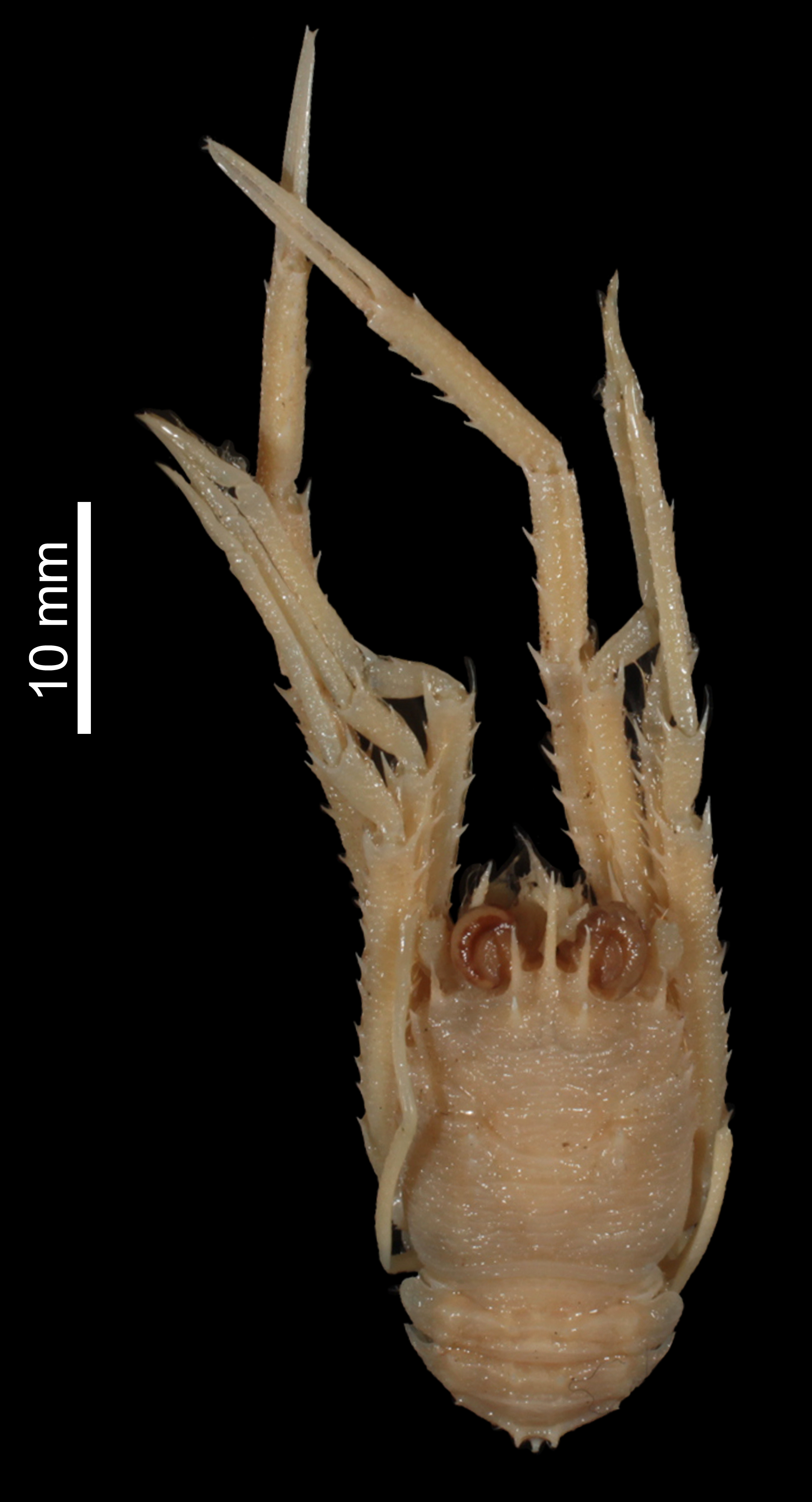
- Preserved specimen of Agononida vanuacerta

Scientific classification
- Kingdom: Animalia
- Phylum: Arthropoda
- Clade: Pancrustacea
- Class: Malacostraca
- Order: Decapoda
- Suborder: Pleocyemata
- Infraorder: Anomura
- Family: Munididae
- Genus: Agononida
- Species: A. vanuacerta

Binomial name
- Agononida vanuacerta Poore & Andreakis, 2014

= Agononida vanuacerta =

Species of crustacean

Agononida vanuacerta is a species of squat lobster in the family Munididae.
