= Garymunida similis =

Scientific classification
- Kingdom: Animalia
- Phylum: Arthropoda
- Clade: Pancrustacea
- Class: Malacostraca
- Order: Decapoda
- Suborder: Pleocyemata
- Infraorder: Anomura
- Family: Munididae
- Genus: Garymunida
- Species: G. similis

Binomial name
- Garymunida similis (Baba, 1988)

Synonyms
- Munida similis Baba, 1988; Agononida similis (Baba, 1988)

Species of crustacean

Garymunida similis is a species of squat lobster in the family Munididae. The males measure from 13.1 to 21.3 millimetres (0.52 to 0.84 in) and the females from 11.3 to 18.4 millimetres (0.44 to 0.72 in). It is found off the Philippines, at depths between 290 and 495 metres (951 and 1,624 ft).
