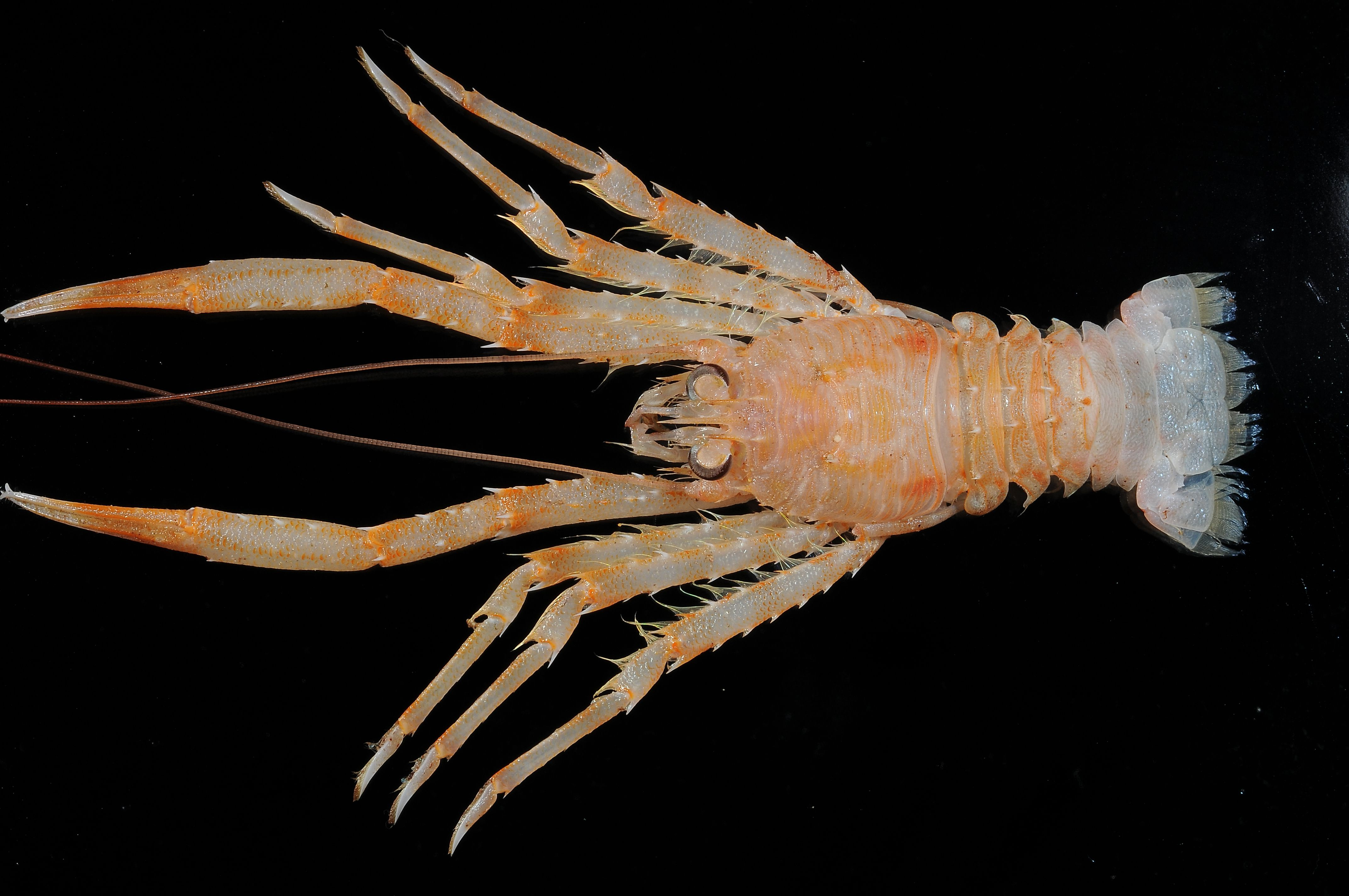

Scientific classification
- Kingdom: Animalia
- Phylum: Arthropoda
- Clade: Pancrustacea
- Class: Malacostraca
- Order: Decapoda
- Suborder: Pleocyemata
- Infraorder: Anomura
- Family: Munididae
- Genus: Agononida
- Species: A. norfocerta

Binomial name
- Agononida norfocerta Poore & Andreakis, 2012

= Agononida norfocerta =

Species of crustacean

Agononida norfocerta is a species of squat lobster in the family Munididae. The species name is a combination of Norfolk Ridge and the Latin word incerta, the feminine version of the word incertus, meaning "doubtful." The males measure from 23 to 30.7 millimetres (0.91 to 1.21 in) and the females from 20 to 29 millimetres (0.79 to 1.14 in). It is found in the southwestern Pacific Ocean and near the Norfolk Ridge, where its specific epithet comes from. It is usually found at depth of about 600 metres (2,000 ft).
