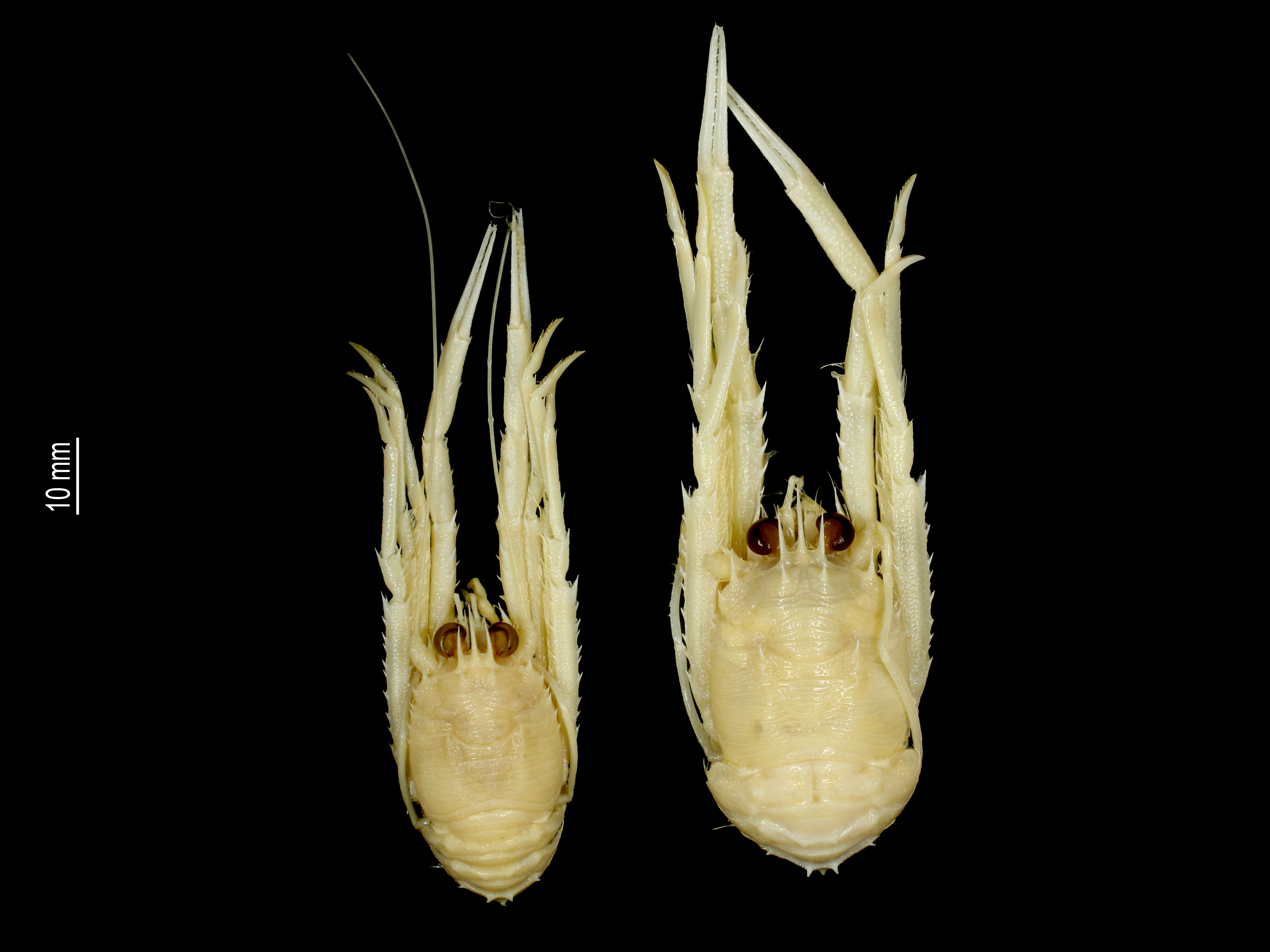

Scientific classification
- Kingdom: Animalia
- Phylum: Arthropoda
- Clade: Pancrustacea
- Class: Malacostraca
- Order: Decapoda
- Suborder: Pleocyemata
- Infraorder: Anomura
- Family: Munididae
- Genus: Agononida
- Species: A. indocerta

Binomial name
- Agononida indocerta Poore & Andreakis, 2012

= Agononida indocerta =

Species of crustacean

Agononida indocerta is a species of squat lobster in the family Munididae. The species name is a combination of Indian Ocean and the Latin word incerta, the feminine version of the word incertus, meaning "doubtful".
