= Agononida tasmancerta =

Scientific classification
- Kingdom: Animalia
- Phylum: Arthropoda
- Clade: Pancrustacea
- Class: Malacostraca
- Order: Decapoda
- Suborder: Pleocyemata
- Infraorder: Anomura
- Family: Munididae
- Genus: Agononida
- Species: A. tasmancerta

Binomial name
- Agononida tasmancerta Poore & Andreakis, 2014

Species of crustacean

Agononida tasmancerta is a species of squat lobster in the family Munididae.
