= Garymunida squamosa =

Scientific classification
- Domain: Eukaryota
- Kingdom: Animalia
- Phylum: Arthropoda
- Class: Malacostraca
- Order: Decapoda
- Suborder: Pleocyemata
- Infraorder: Anomura
- Family: Munididae
- Genus: Garymunida
- Species: G. squamosa

Binomial name
- Garymunida squamosa (Henderson, 1885)

Synonyms
- Munida squamosa Henderson, 1885; Agononida squamosa (Henderson, 1885)

Species of crustacean

Garymunida squamosa is a species of squat lobster in the family Munididae. The males measure from 5.5 to 17.0 millimetres (0.22 to 0.67 in) and the females from 5.1 to 16.4 millimetres (0.20 to 0.65 in). It is found off of Japan, Indonesia, the Admiralty Islands, northeastern Australia, New Caledonia, Loyalty Islands, and Wallis and Futuna, at depths between about 175 and 750 metres (574 and 2,461 ft). It is also found off of Fiji and Tonga, where it resides between depths of about 350 and 590 metres (1,150 and 1,940 ft).
