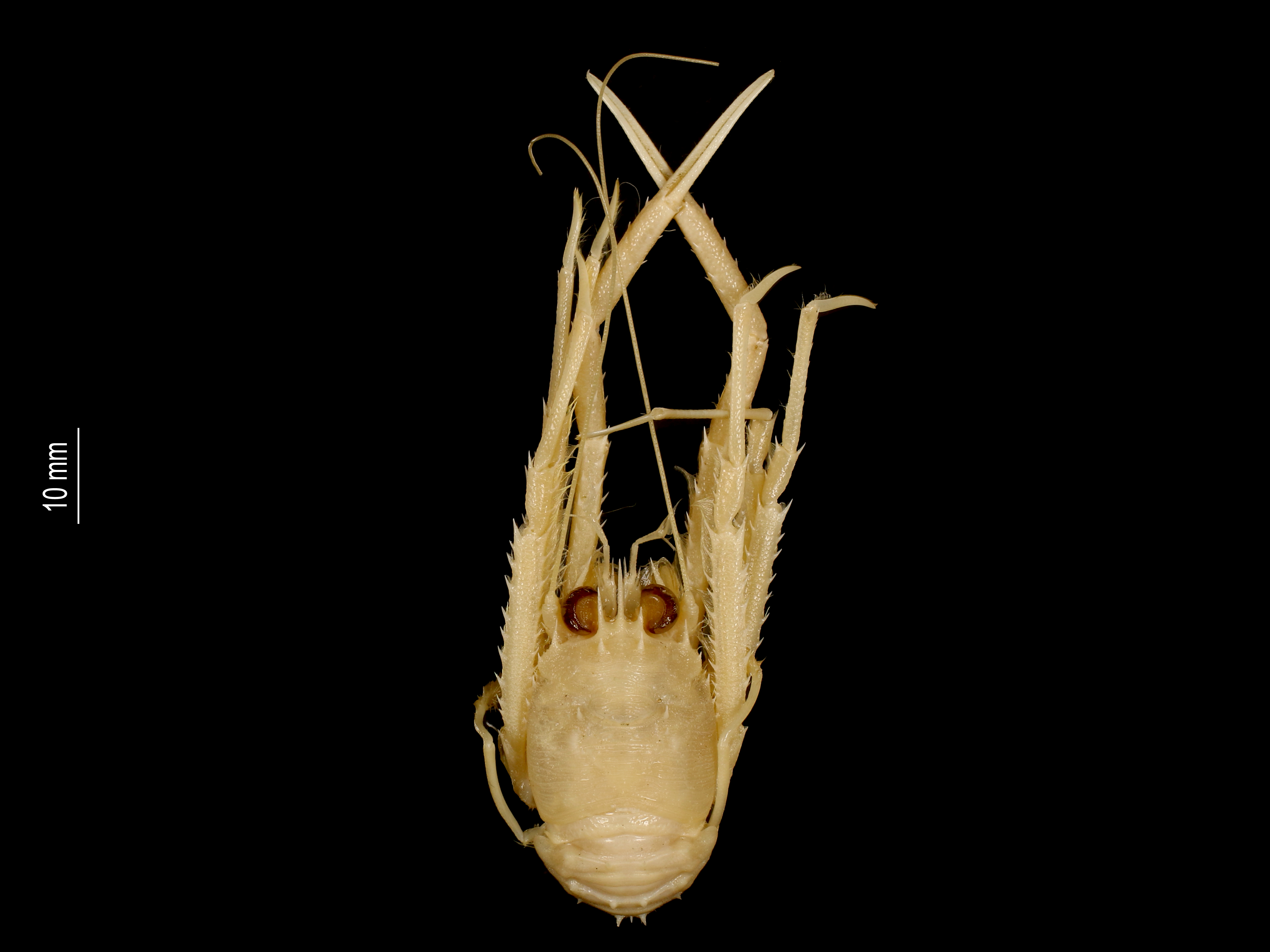

Scientific classification
- Kingdom: Animalia
- Phylum: Arthropoda
- Clade: Pancrustacea
- Class: Malacostraca
- Order: Decapoda
- Suborder: Pleocyemata
- Infraorder: Anomura
- Family: Munididae
- Genus: Agononida
- Species: A. rubrizonata

Binomial name
- Agononida rubrizonata Macpherson & Baba, 2009

= Agononida rubrizonata =

Species of crustacean

Agononida rubrizonata is a species of squat lobster in the family Munididae. The males measure from about 15 to 28 millimetres (0.59 to 1.10 in) and the females from about 23 to 26 millimetres (0.91 to 1.02 in). It is found off of New Caledonia, Loyalty Islands, Taiwan, Vanuatu, and the eastern and western margins of Australia, at depths between about 275 and 755 metres (902 and 2,477 ft).
