= Garymunida soelae =

Scientific classification
- Kingdom: Animalia
- Phylum: Arthropoda
- Clade: Pancrustacea
- Class: Malacostraca
- Order: Decapoda
- Suborder: Pleocyemata
- Infraorder: Anomura
- Family: Munididae
- Genus: Garymunida
- Species: G. soelae

Binomial name
- Garymunida soelae (Baba, 1986)

Synonyms
- Munida soelae Baba, 1986; Agononida soelae (Baba, 1986)

Species of crustacean

Garymunida soelae is a species of squat lobster in the family Munididae. The species is named for the research vessel Soela, which is the vessel on which the type specimen was collected. The males measure about 28.2 millimetres (1.11 in) and the females about 14.1 millimetres (0.56 in). It is found off of Indonesia, northwestern Australia, and New Caledonia, at depths between 450 and 620 metres (1,480 and 2,030 ft). It is also found off of Fiji, where it resides between depths of about 680 and 725 metres (2,231 and 2,379 ft).
