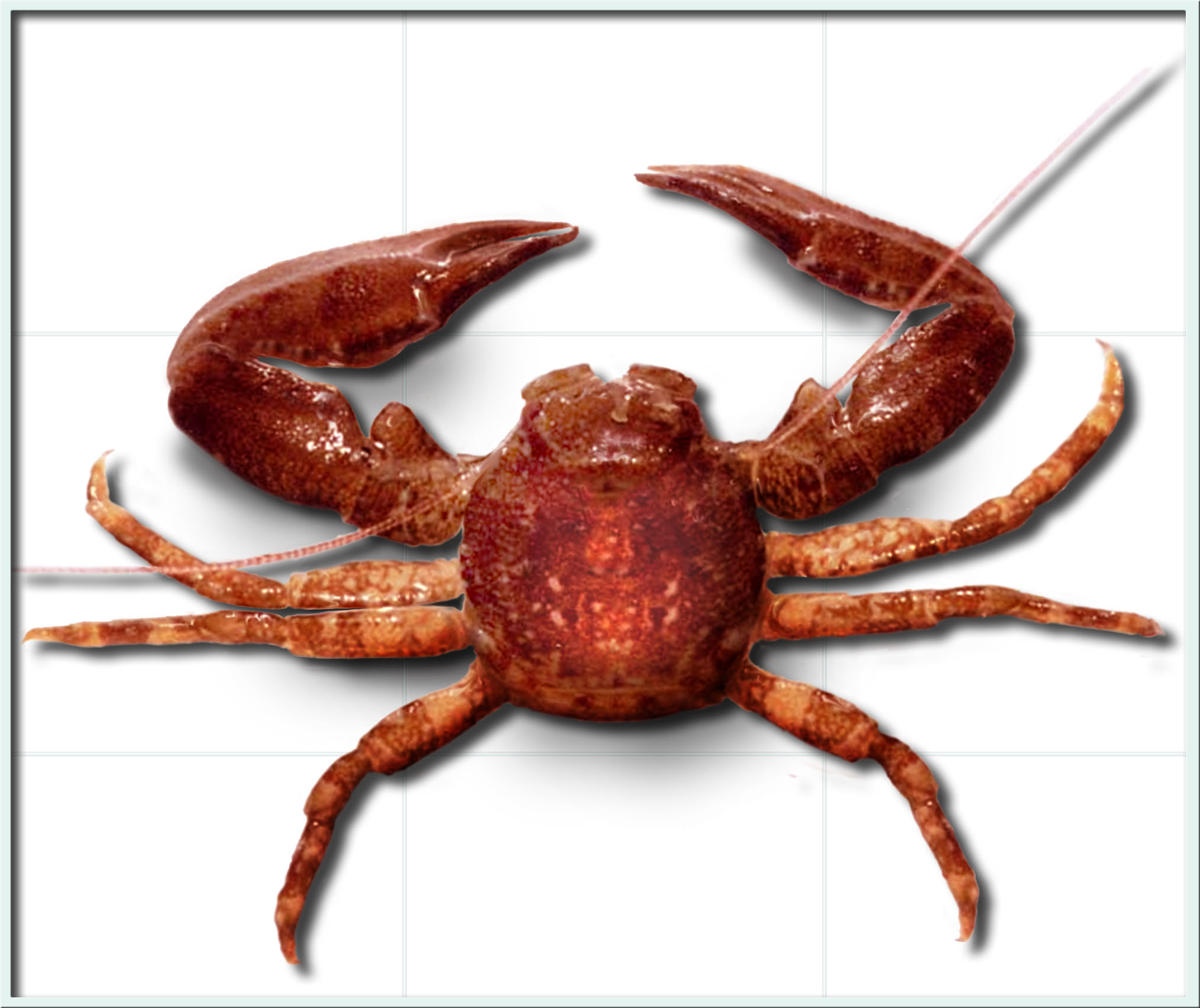

Scientific classification
- Kingdom: Animalia
- Phylum: Arthropoda
- Class: Malacostraca
- Order: Decapoda
- Suborder: Pleocyemata
- Infraorder: Anomura
- Family: Porcellanidae
- Genus: Pisidia
- Species: P. longicornis

Binomial name
- Pisidia longicornis (Linnaeus, 1767)

Synonyms
- Cancer hexapus Linnaeus, 1767; Pisidia linnaeana Leach, 1820; Porcellana longicornis Linnaeus, 1767

= Pisidia longicornis =

Species of crustacean

Pisidia longicornis, the long-clawed porcelain crab, is a species of porcelain crab that lives in the north-eastern Atlantic Ocean. It varies from reddish to white, and grows to a carapace width of 1 cm (0.4 in). It was first named by Carl Linnaeus in 1767, although the etymology remains unclear.

== Description ==
Adult Pisidia longicornis typically have a carapace length of 1 centimetre (0.4 in). Its colouration is variable, with most individuals being reddish or orange, but some having patches of pearly white, or even being entirely white. One cheliped (claw-bearing appendage) is usually larger than the other, although this difference is less pronounced in females than in males. The fifth pair of legs is reduced in size and may be difficult to see.

== Distribution and ecology ==
Pisidia longicornis is found in the north-eastern Atlantic Ocean from Norway to Angola, and throughout the Mediterranean Sea. It is found from the lower shore down to depths of 70 metres (230 ft) in the north Atlantic, but at depths of 30–100 m (100–330 ft) in some locations around the Mediterranean Sea. It lives under boulders and among bryozoan turfs, and may occasionally be found in fish markets among mussels and oysters.

It feeds by filtering suspended material from the sea water. Individuals from the intertidal zone tend to be larger than those from deeper water, which may be related to the greater churning of the sediment by the tide.

== Life cycle ==
Females bear eggs from March to August around the British Isles, and from February to September in the Mediterranean Sea. Young Pisidia longicornis go through two zoeal (larval) stages before reaching the megalopa (post-larval) stage. The zoea larvae bear "exceptionally long" spines on the carapace, one directed forwards, and two directed backwards. The second zoeal stage may reach a length of 10 millimetres (0.4 in), while the megalopa has a carapace width of 1.5 mm (0.06 in).

== Taxonomy ==
Pisidia longicornis was first described in 1767 by Carl Linnaeus, originally under the name Porcellana longicornis, in the 12th edition of his Systema Naturae. The specific epithet longicornis is difficult to explain, it being Latin for "long-horned", from longus and cornu; it may refer to the long chelipeds (claw-bearing appendages). The species was moved from the genus Porcellana by William Elford Leach when he established the genus Pisidia in 1820.
