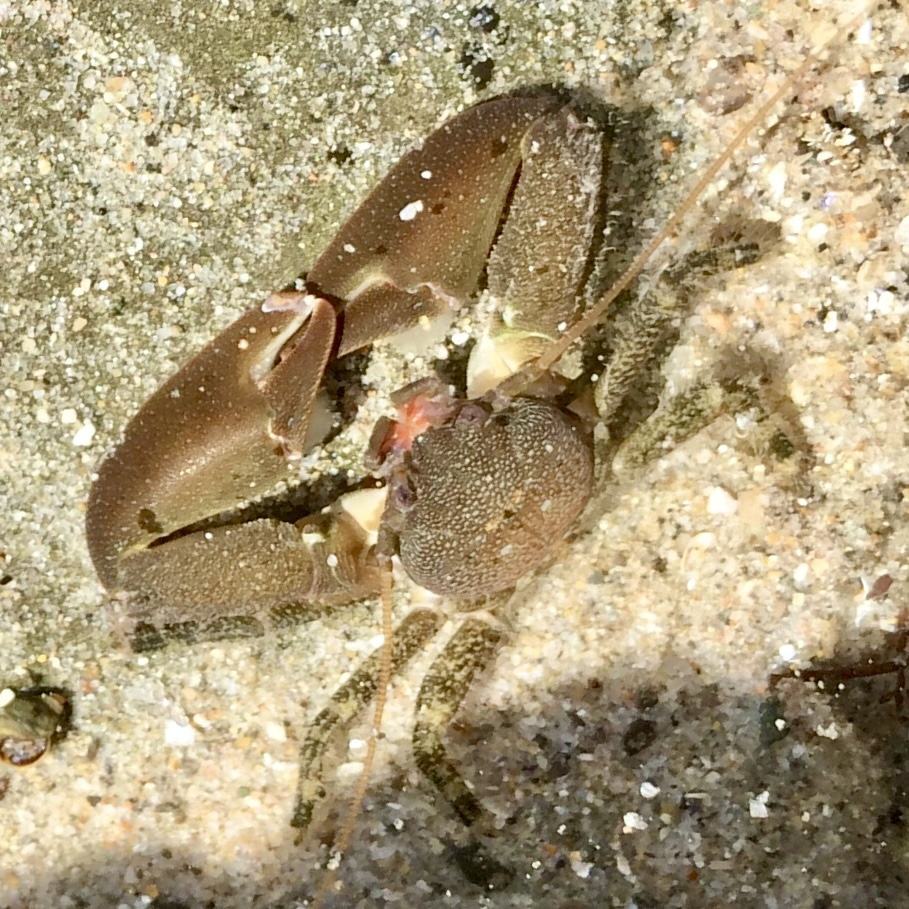

Scientific classification
- Kingdom: Animalia
- Phylum: Arthropoda
- Clade: Pancrustacea
- Class: Malacostraca
- Order: Decapoda
- Suborder: Pleocyemata
- Infraorder: Anomura
- Family: Porcellanidae
- Genus: Petrolisthes
- Species: P. cabrilloi

Binomial name
- Petrolisthes cabrilloi S.A. Glassell, 1945

= Petrolisthes cabrilloi =

Species of crustacean

Petrolisthes cabrilloi, also known as the Cabrillo porcelain crab, is a species of porcelain crab. Native to the Pacific coast of North America, it was first described to science by Steve Glassell in 1945 from crabs collected in Anaheim Landing, California. Its range is believed to be from Morro Bay to Baja California. It is more common than its close cousin Petrolisthes cinctipes in waters south of Point Conception.

== Description ==
The Cabrillo porcelain crab is a smooth porcelain crab with a dull orange carapace that is marked by small spots. These spots have some pubescence in them, with the carapace noticeably hairier in juveniles. The chelipeds, commonly called pincers or claws, are large, about three times the width of the carapace. Each cheliped is flattened and has a carpus ("wrist") that is about twice as long than it is wide, without strong tubercles or teeth adorning it. P. cabrilloi is the most similar in appearance to P. cinctipes, and is often found under the same rocks, but only P. cabrilloi has pubescent, setose ambulatory legs, a carpus length twice that of the width, and juvenile carapace pubescence.

P. cabrilloi has the longest cheliped tufts of any Petrolisthes species in California. While Petrolisthes species are primarily filter feeders, these tufts can be used to capture food particles while scraping it from environmental surfaces. P. cabrilloi likewise differs from other Petrolisthes species by its higher tolerance for sand and turbid water, but is also often found with other Petrolisthes species in the rocky intertidal zone.
