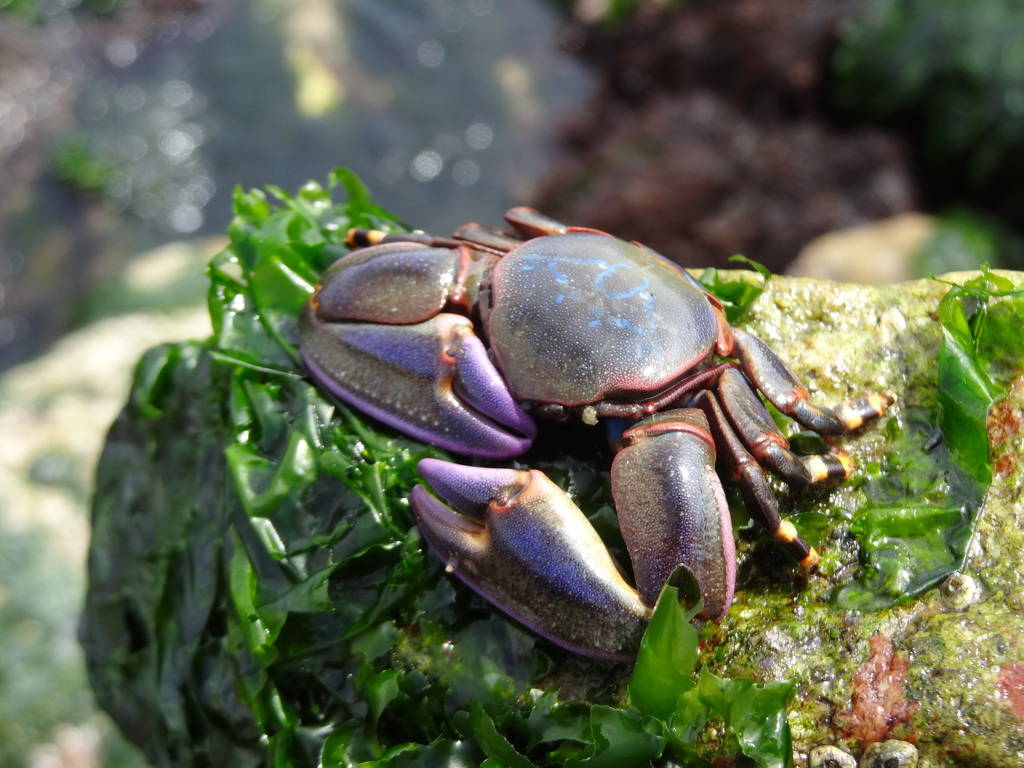

Scientific classification
- Kingdom: Animalia
- Phylum: Arthropoda
- Clade: Pancrustacea
- Class: Malacostraca
- Order: Decapoda
- Suborder: Pleocyemata
- Infraorder: Anomura
- Family: Porcellanidae
- Genus: Petrolisthes
- Species: P. violaceus

Binomial name
- Petrolisthes violaceus (Guérin, 1829)

Synonyms
- Porcellana macrocheles; Porcellana violacea

= Petrolisthes violaceus =

Species of porcelain crab

Petrolisthes violaceus is a species of porcelain crab endemic to the south-eastern Pacific.

== Description ==
Petrolisthes violaceus has planktonic larvae that remain as plankton for more than 25 days. The development of the larvae occurs in four stages: a prezoea, two zoeal stages, and a megalopa stage.

== Range ==
Petrolisthes violaceus' range is from Callao, Peru to the Taitao Peninsula in Chile.

== Habitat ==
It is one of the most common decapods in the intertidal zone of its range. It is a free-living crab, commonly found in crevice, under boulders, or between rocks. Compared to another Petrolisthes species, Petrolisthes laevigatus, it occupies the lower intertidal zone. Compared to P. laevigatus, P. violaceus is more active and more aggressive.

== Ecology ==
Because of the vertical distribution and its intertidal habitat, P. violaceus is regularly exposed to different periods of air exposure, which varies by the heights of the tides. Gaitán-Espitia et al. demonstrated that P. violaceus exhibits a gradient of physiological responses in metabolic and heart rates across a latitude gradient of 3000 kilometers. P. violaceus is better able to cope with water hypoxia due to its position in the lower intertidal zone; it is proposed that in aquatic conditions, P. violaceus has an oxyconformer strategy and is able to adapt its oxygen demands in an oxygen-fluctuating environment.

== Taxonomy ==
Petrolisthes violaceus is the type species of the genus Petrolisthes.
