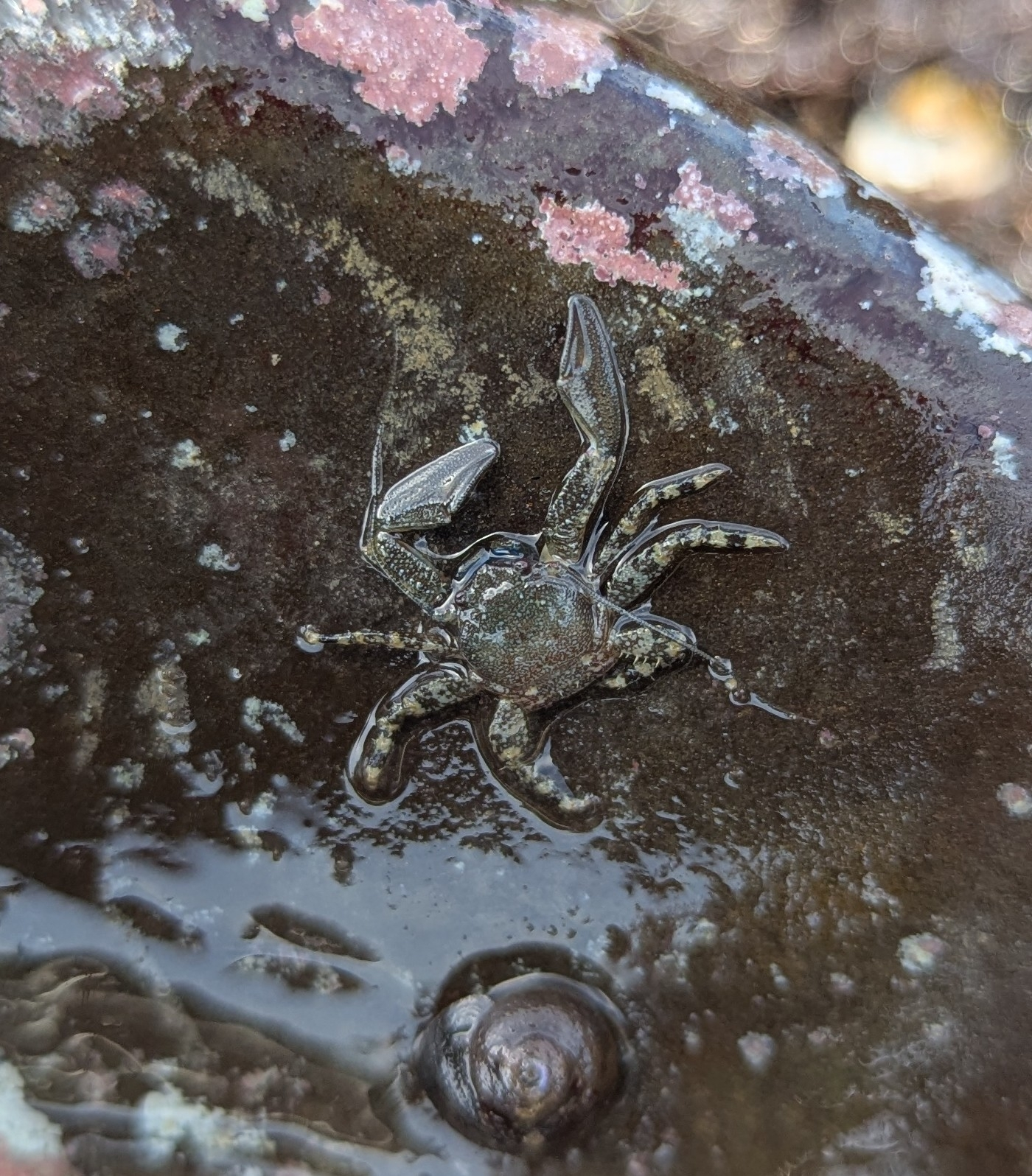
- Moss Beach, California, 2025

Scientific classification
- Kingdom: Animalia
- Phylum: Arthropoda
- Class: Malacostraca
- Order: Decapoda
- Suborder: Pleocyemata
- Infraorder: Anomura
- Family: Porcellanidae
- Genus: Petrolisthes
- Species: P. manimaculis

Binomial name
- Petrolisthes manimaculis (Glassell, S. A, 1945)

= Petrolisthes manimaculis =

Species of crustacean

Petrolisthes manimaculis, commonly known as the chocolate porcelain crab, is a species of marine porcelain crab found in the lower intertidal zone, primarily among rocks and weeds, along the coast of California.

== Description ==
Petrolisthes manimaculis has a red or chocolate colored carapace, tan legs, gray antennae, and long chelipeds (claw-bearing arms) that extend 2-3 times the width of the carapace. The species name manimaculis is derived from the Latin for "spotted hands," due to the pattern of turquoise-blue spots on this species' claws that distinguish it from other sympatric species. Another distinguishing feature is that, unlike P. eriomerus, which has blue coloration at the base of its dactyls (the claw's movable appendages), P. manimaculis has a distinctly orange coloration at the base of its dactyls.

== Biology ==
Petrolisthes manimaculis is known for its distinctive courting behaviors, where the male extends its third maxilliped to the feeding position and oscillates this mouthpart in the extended position. Courtship can last several hours as the male waits for the female to molt. Soon after molting, the male uses its walking legs to position the female for copulation.

Like other porcelain crabs, P. manimaculis is a filter feeder. It sweeps its maxillipeds through the water to collect plankton and other organic matter from the water. Since it does not use its chelae (claws) for feeding, it can voluntarily detach them through a reflex called autotomy, which is deployed in around 40% of predator attacks, or even more frequently among females and smaller crabs.
