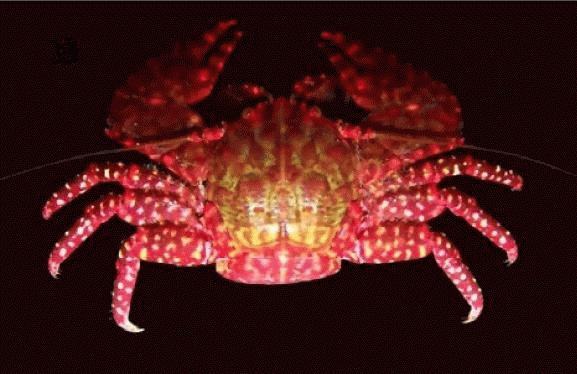

Scientific classification
- Kingdom: Animalia
- Phylum: Arthropoda
- Clade: Pancrustacea
- Class: Malacostraca
- Order: Decapoda
- Suborder: Pleocyemata
- Infraorder: Anomura
- Family: Porcellanidae
- Genus: Allopetrolisthes
- Species: A. spinifrons

Binomial name
- Allopetrolisthes spinifrons (H. Milne-Edwards, 1837)

Synonyms
- Porcellana spinifrons H. Milne-Edwards, 1837; Petrolisthes spinifrons (H. Milne-Edwards, 1837)

= Allopetrolisthes spinifrons =

Species of porcelain crab

Allopetrolisthes spinifrons is a species of porcelain crab. This species can be found along the Pacific coast of Peru and Chile. It is a symbiont of a sea anemone.

It displays "hypercarcinisation", whereby the resemblance to a true crab is enhanced by sexual dimorphism of the abdomen.

== Description ==
Allopetrolisthes spinifrons grows to a maximum carapace length of around 20 millimetres (0.79 in). It displays an extreme form of carcinisation – evolution of a crab-like form – referred to as "hypercarcinisation". In contrast to other porcelain crabs, A. spinifrons shows sexual dimorphism of the pleon (abdomen), closely resembling the situation in true crabs. Females have a large pleon, similar to that of other porcelain crabs, covering almost all of the sternum. Males have a short, triangular pleon that only covers a small part of the sternum. A. spinifrons also differs from its relatives in having many fewer and smaller spines on its legs. These morphological differences are thought to be a consequence of the species' ecology, living in close association with a sea anemone, where the ability to escape by swimming is not needed.

== Distribution and ecology ==
Allopetrolisthes spinifrons is found in the eastern Pacific Ocean, from Isla San Lorenzo, Peru to San Vicente, Chile, at depths of up to 12 fathoms (72 ft; 22 m).

A. spinifrons lives symbiotically on the sea anemone Phymactis papillosa, chiefly in the lower intertidal zone. In common with other porcelain crabs, A. spinifrons is a filter feeder, but will also feed on faeces and mucus produced by the sea anemone. The porcelain crab benefits from the protection afforded by the sea anemone's stinging cells.

== Taxonomy ==
Allopetrolisthes spinifrons was first described in 1837 by Henri Milne-Edwards, under the name Porcellana spinifrons. It was placed in the genus Petrolisthes by Giuseppe Nobili in 1901, and moved to the new genus Allopetrolisthes by Janet Haig in 1960, alongside two other species formerly placed in Petrolisthes.
