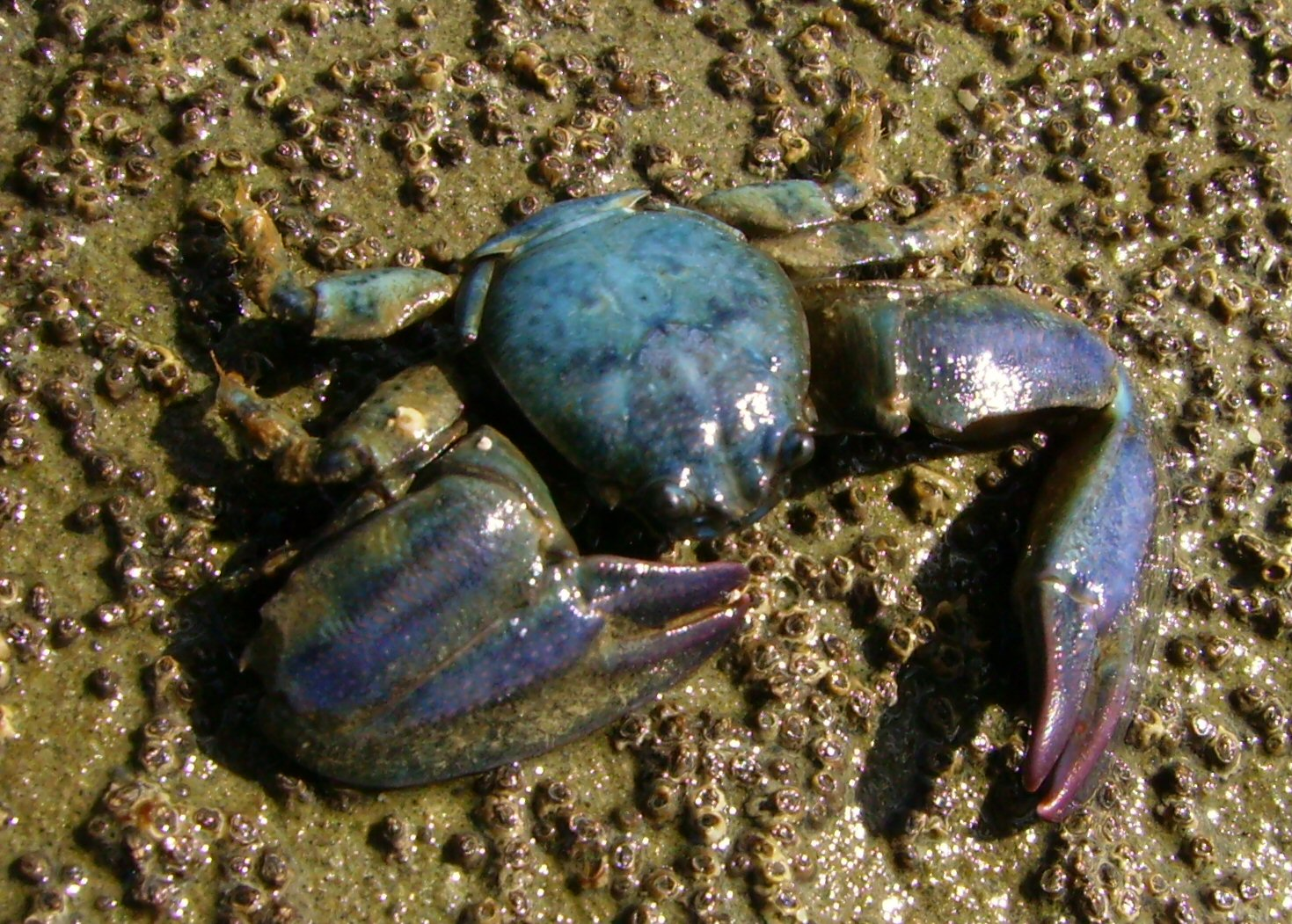

Scientific classification
- Kingdom: Animalia
- Phylum: Arthropoda
- Class: Malacostraca
- Order: Decapoda
- Suborder: Pleocyemata
- Infraorder: Anomura
- Family: Porcellanidae
- Genus: Petrolisthes
- Species: P. elongatus

Binomial name
- Petrolisthes elongatus (H. Milne-Edwards, 1837)

Synonyms
- Porcellana elongata H. Milne-Edwards, 1837

= Petrolisthes elongatus =

Species of crustacean

Petrolisthes elongatus, known as the New Zealand half crab, elongated porcelain crab, blue half crab, blue false crab or simply as the half crab or false crab, is a species of porcelain crab native to New Zealand.

== Description ==
The carapace is flattened with smooth side and rear margins, width is up to 18 mm (0.71 in), and long whip-like antennae grow from the front corners, with the short rostrum extending beyond the large prominent eyes. The animal either filter feeds with long setae borne from the maxilliped palps, or scavenges by chopping up flesh with the second maxilliped and further shredding with the mandibles. The large chelipeds are generally smooth with no teeth or serrations, mainly used for territorial defense among males, who usually have one enlarged. Chelipeds and legs bear randomly located spines which can break off with wear, and these areas are dorsally coloured the same as the carapace, in black, blue, greenish or greyish, the ventral areas lighter. The last pair of legs are setose, reduced in size and carried folded under a large abdominal flap, which also allows the animal to swim backwards. Telson and uropods also setose.

Studies in New Zealand from the 1960s and 1970s showed a difference in breeding biology from north to south, with ovigerous females found all year round in Auckland, and only in the summer months around Kaikōura. Females are assumed to brood two or three times during their lifespan, producing 500 – 1000 eggs.

== Distribution & Habitat ==
P. elongatus is native to all areas of New Zealand but has also been introduced to Tasmania and Victoria, Australia. In New Zealand it inhabits mussel beds, wharf pilings, estuaries, and the intertidal zone on rocky shores, where it is abundant beneath boulders and stones.
