= Jurellana =

Jurellana Temporal range: Tithonian

Scientific classification
- Kingdom: Animalia
- Phylum: Arthropoda
- Clade: Pancrustacea
- Class: Malacostraca
- Order: Decapoda
- Suborder: Pleocyemata
- Infraorder: Brachyura
- Family: †Jurellanidae
- Genus: †Jurellana; Schweitzer & Feldmann, 2010
- Species: †J. tithonia

Binomial name
- †Jurellana tithonia Schweitzer & Feldmann, 2010

Extinct genus of crustaceans

Jurellana tithonia, the only species in the genus Jurellana, is a fossil crab. It was found in limestone rocks from the Ernstbrunn Formation in Austria, which have been dated to the Tithonian (late Jurassic). It was originally thought to be the world's oldest porcelain crab, but was later determined to actually be a true crab.

== Taxonomy and stratigraphy ==
Jurellana tithonia was described in 2010 by palaeontologists Carrie Schweitzer and Rodney Feldmann, as the only species in the genus. The genus' name was based on the name of the type genus of the porcelain crabs, Porcellana, and the word Jurassic. The specific epithet tithonia also refers to the age during which the animal lived – in this case, the Tithonian. The type specimens were discovered near Ernstbrunn, Lower Austria, and are now held at the Naturhistorisches Museum in Vienna. The rocks that contained the specimens have been dated to the Tithonian based on the ammonites they contain; they also contain a number of crabs. This makes Jurellana the oldest known porcelain crab. However, a 2019 study found it to be a true crab instead, belonging to the new family Jurellanidae along with the newly described genus Ovalopus.

== Description ==
Two specimens of Jurellana tithonia are known, one considerably larger than the other. The larger one has a carapace 10.8 mm (0.43 in) long and 9.8 mm (0.39 in) wide, with a distance between the orbits of the eyes of 7.8 mm (0.31 in). The smaller specimen has a carapace 4.0 mm (0.16 in) long and 4.0 mm (0.16 in) wide, and orbits 3.4 mm (0.13 in) apart. J. tithonia differs from other porcelain crabs in that its rostrum, rather than extending forwards from the front of the carapace, is turned 90° downwards. It is 5.4 mm (0.21 in) wide in the larger specimen, and 2.2 mm (0.087 in) wide in the smaller specimen. The appendages of the animal have not been preserved in either specimen.
