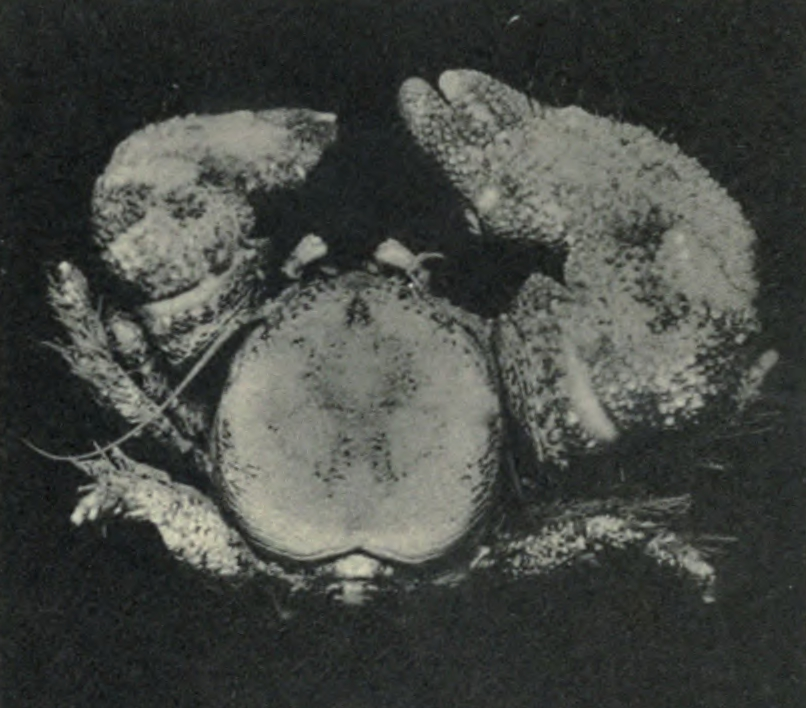
- Male Pachycheles rudis

Scientific classification
- Domain: Eukaryota
- Kingdom: Animalia
- Phylum: Arthropoda
- Class: Malacostraca
- Order: Decapoda
- Suborder: Pleocyemata
- Infraorder: Anomura
- Family: Porcellanidae
- Genus: Pachycheles
- Species: P. rudis

Binomial name
- Pachycheles rudis Stimpson, 1859

= Pachycheles rudis =

Species of crab

Pachycheles rudis, the thickclaw porcelain crab or big-clawed porcelain crab, is a species of porcelain crab in the family Porcellanidae. It is found on the coast of the East Pacific from Baja California to Kodiak, Alaska. It is a filter feeder and may be found in "crevices, nooks, and interstices, and is often at home in the discarded and Alcyonidium-lined shells of barnacles."
