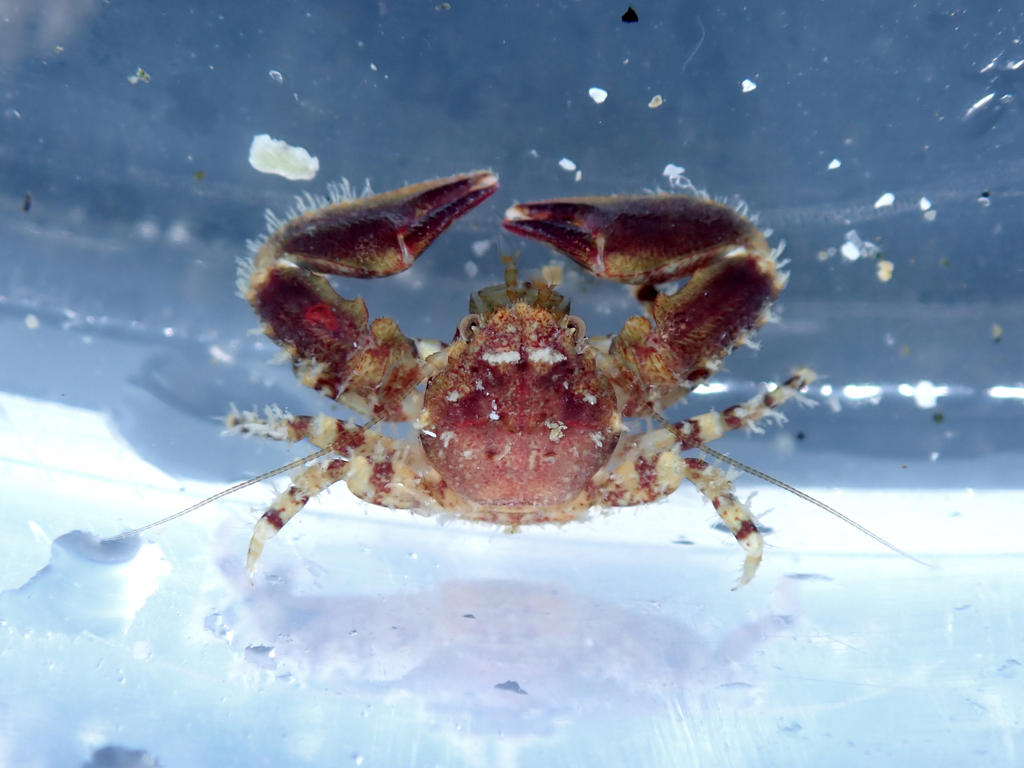

Scientific classification
- Domain: Eukaryota
- Kingdom: Animalia
- Phylum: Arthropoda
- Class: Malacostraca
- Order: Decapoda
- Suborder: Pleocyemata
- Infraorder: Anomura
- Family: Porcellanidae
- Genus: Petrolisthes
- Species: P. novaezelandiae

Binomial name
- Petrolisthes novaezelandiae (Filhol, 1885)

Synonyms
- Petrolisthes stewarti Filhol, 1885

= Petrolisthes novaezelandiae =

Species of crustacean

Petrolisthes novaezelandiae, known as the red half crab or red false crab, is a species of porcelain crab native to New Zealand.

== Description ==
The carapace is flattened and covered in short fine hairs, length up to 12mm, width up to 12.5mm. Males appear dull reddish to tan brown, while females are greyish brown, often with small red spots. Chelae more slender than in P. elongatus, generally larger in the male.

== Distribution and habitat ==
Endemic to New Zealand, where it is widely distributed down to the Auckland Islands. Usually found beneath boulders, or in shell debris. On hard shores sometimes found in the holdfasts of seaweed, especially Macrocystis sp. Rarely found in the intertidal zone, more common from 3 to 75m deep.
