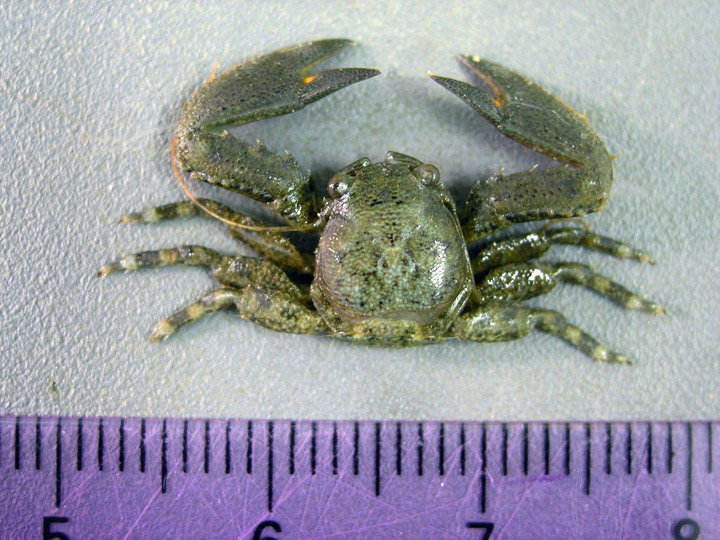

Scientific classification
- Kingdom: Animalia
- Phylum: Arthropoda
- Clade: Pancrustacea
- Class: Malacostraca
- Order: Decapoda
- Suborder: Pleocyemata
- Infraorder: Anomura
- Family: Porcellanidae
- Genus: Petrolisthes
- Species: P. armatus

Binomial name
- Petrolisthes armatus (Gibbes, 1850)

Synonyms
- Petrolisthes armatus var. pallidus Verrill, 1908; Petrolisthes iheringi Ortmann, 1897; Petrolisthes similis Henderson, 1888; Porcellana gundlachii Guérin-Méneville, 1855; Porcellana leporina Heller, 1862

= Petrolisthes armatus =

Species of crustacean

Petrolisthes armatus, the green porcelain crab, is a species of small porcelain crab in the family Porcellanidae. It is believed to be native to Brazil but has spread to other parts of the world. Populations in the south eastern part of the United States have increased dramatically and the species is considered to be an invasive species.

== Taxonomy ==
Although superficially resembling true crabs, porcelain crabs are sometimes known as half-crabs and are in the infra-order Anomura and thus more closely related to squat lobsters than to crabs. Because of its wide geographical range, several authors have questioned whether Petrolisthes armatus is a single species or a species complex. It has been suggested that there are three separate lineages, one from the warm-temperate Atlantic region, one from the Caribbean and one from the eastern Pacific. Research using mitochondrial DNA to study the genetic variability of Petrolisthes armatus has led to the conclusion that it is monophyletic, a single species with an exceptionally wide range. In fact, specimens from the Pacific coast of Costa Rica and Ecuador were found to be more closely related to those in the Gulf of Mexico than to individuals in other parts of the Pacific.

== Description ==
The carapace of Petrolisthes armatus is roughly oval with a bluntly pointed front, and is granulated and covered with shallow, narrow ridges. P. armatus has two long chelipeds with chelae (pincers), three pairs of walking legs and a vestigial fourth pair. The chelipeds are composed of four rather than five segments and the chelae are long and have a distinctive orange spot that becomes visible when they are parted. The antennae, which have a spine on the first segment, are set outside the stalked eyes. This is characteristic of porcelain crabs, and is in contrast to most families of crabs, where they are set between the eyes. Petrolisthes armatus is a very small species, varying in length between 6 and 8 mm (0.24 and 0.31 in) with a weight of about 0.5 g (0.02 oz). The colour is generally brown or dark olive-green. Juveniles tend to be paler and mottled. The mouthparts sometimes have bright blue portions and the whole animal is occasionally bright blue.

== Distribution and habitat ==
Petrolisthes armatus is believed to have originated off the coast of Brazil, although this is not certain. However, by the 1930s, it was known off the east coast of Florida, and it has spread since then to the whole of Florida, Georgia and South Carolina. It is also known from the tropical west African coast, Ascension Island, Bermuda, the Bahamas, the Caribbean Sea, the Gulf of Mexico, the West Indies, and the tropical Atlantic coast of South America. It also occurs in the eastern Pacific, from the Baja California Peninsula southwards to Peru, and has been known from the coast of Panama since 1859, before the Panama Canal was constructed. Its depth range is from the lower intertidal zone to the shallow subtidal zone and it lives on rock rubble, oyster beds, soft sediments, and mangroves.

On the South Carolina and Georgia coasts, it has become very numerous, with densities as high as 30,000 individuals per square metre (2,800 per square foot) having been recorded. It is causing concern because of its impact on the local environment, the fact that it competes with native species, and the concern that it may affect shellfish production in oyster beds. It seems likely that the larvae of Petrolisthes armatus have been carried to new locations in ballast water, or it may have been introduced during the seeding of oyster or other shellfish beds during aquaculture procedures.

== Biology ==
Petrolisthes armatus is primarily a filter feeder. It has large feathery mouthparts with which it snares zooplankton, and other smaller mouthparts transfer the particles to its mouth. It is also a scavenger, feeding on any animal remains it finds on the seabed. It sometimes forms symbiotic relationships with other invertebrates, such as sponges. When it does this, it positions itself so that the water current produced by the sponge passes its own feeding apparatus where it can intercept food particles.

After mating, the female stores spermatophores until her eggs are mature. When the eggs have been fertilised, the female retains them under her tail flap which is folded underneath her body. Here, they are aerated by the pleopods (swimming legs) until they are ready to hatch. The larvae are planktonic and there are two zoeal larval stages and one megalopal stage. When they are ready to undergo metamorphosis, the larvae settle on the sea bed, possibly attracted to a particular location by pheromones released by other species. The females may become sexually mature when only 3 mm (0.12 in) in length.

Petrolisthes armatus is frequently parasitised by the isopod Aporobopyrus curtatus. Up to 17% of individuals have been found to be infected, and up to six isopods have been found per host, but more usually a single pair of immature or mature isopods. Infestation by a juvenile isopod occurs at an early age and host and parasite grow synchronously. The isopod is present in both male and female porcelain crabs, but not usually in egg-carrying females. The effect of the parasitism is to castrate the host but the porcelain crab's growth is unaffected. The low prevalence of the infestation favours both the host and the parasite.
