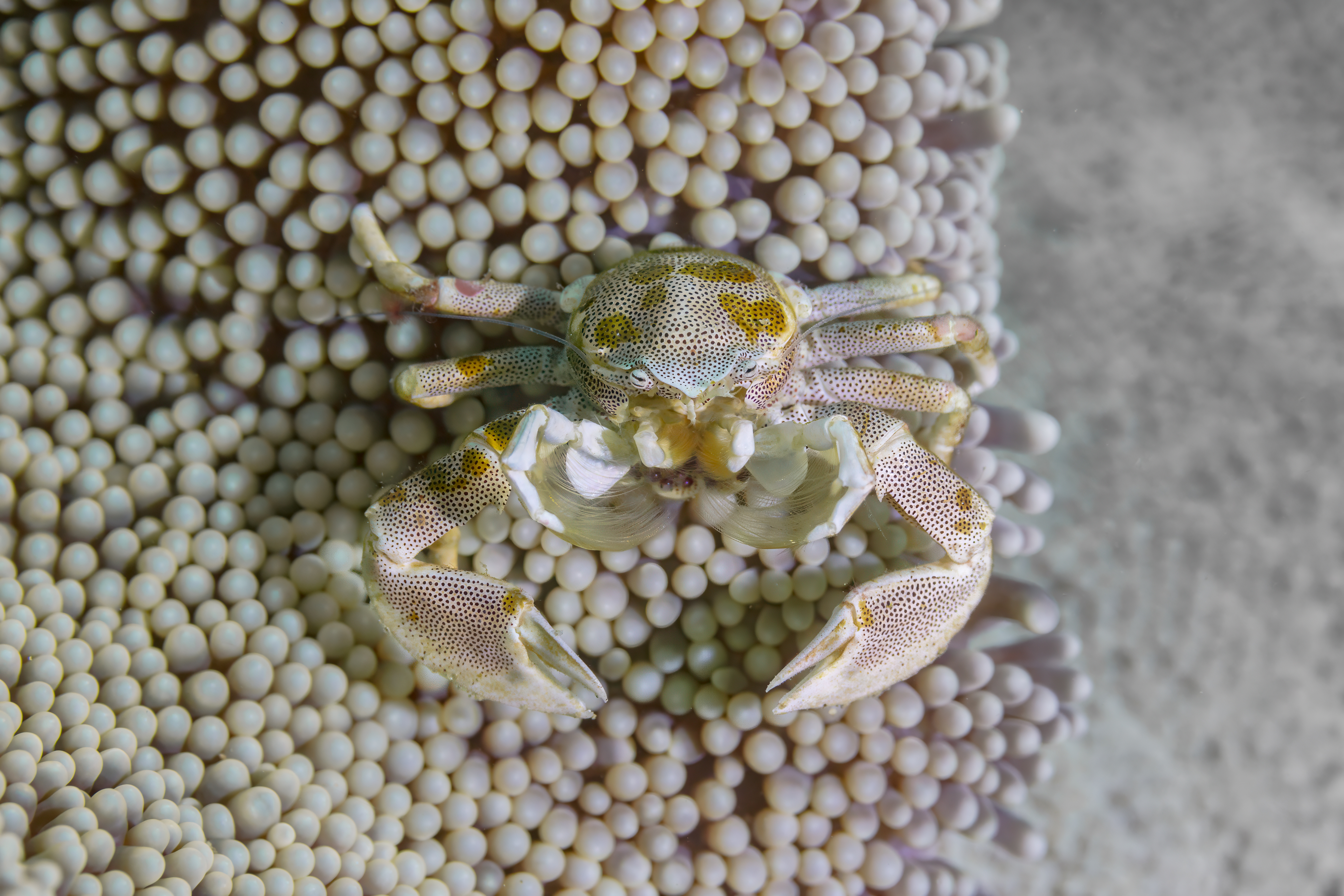
- On Mertens' carpet sea anemone (Stichodactyla mertensii), Anilao, Philippines.

Scientific classification
- Kingdom: Animalia
- Phylum: Arthropoda
- Class: Malacostraca
- Order: Decapoda
- Suborder: Pleocyemata
- Infraorder: Anomura
- Family: Porcellanidae
- Genus: Neopetrolisthes
- Species: N. maculatus

Binomial name
- Neopetrolisthes maculatus (H. Milne-Edwards, 1837)

Synonyms
- Neopetrolisthes ohshimai Miyake, 1937; Petrolisthes ohshimai (Miyake, 1937); Porcellana maculata H. Milne Edwards, 1837

= Neopetrolisthes maculatus =

Species of crustacean

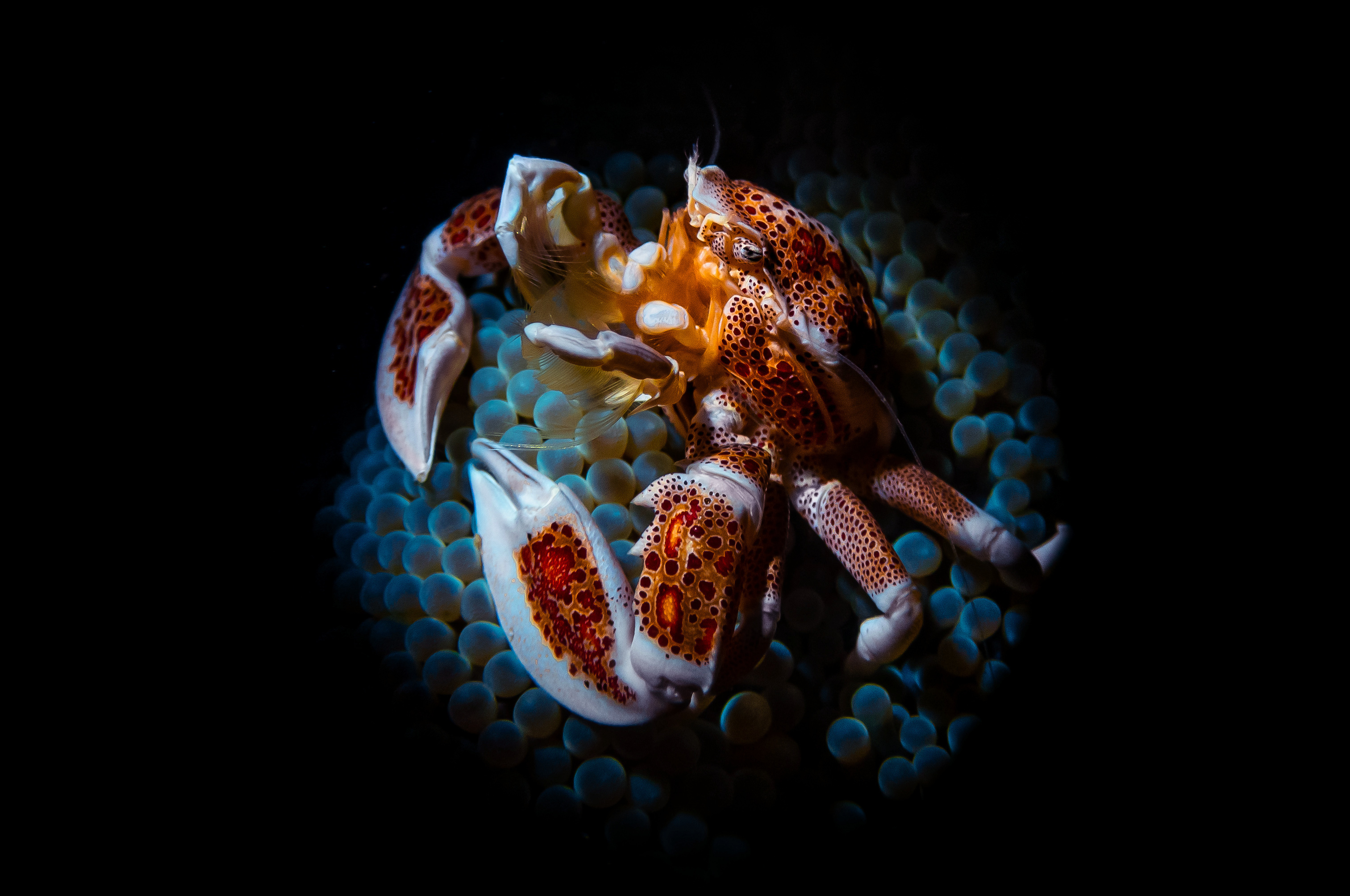
N. maculatus feeding on top of an sea anemone. Photo by Roy Kittrell

Neopetrolisthes maculatus, also commonly known as the anemone porcelain crab, is a species of porcelain crab from the Indo-Pacific region. It is a small, colourful crustacean with a porcelain-like shell. It is usually found within the stinging tentacles of a number of sea anemone species.

== Description ==
They have a round central body with a smooth surface. It shell is porcelain-like. They are colorful with numerous small red spots dotted across.

== Ecology ==
It is usually found on a number of large sea anemone species with each anemone generally containing single pair of crabs. There the stinging tentacles would protect them from potential predators. They are territorial of their anemones.

=== Diet ===
Despite their large claws, they do no use them to capture food and likely use them to defend themselves from predation. Instead they are filter-feeders using long bristles on their mouthparts like a broom sweeping out of the water column organisms such as plankton, algae, small crustaceans and other small organisms.

== Gallery ==
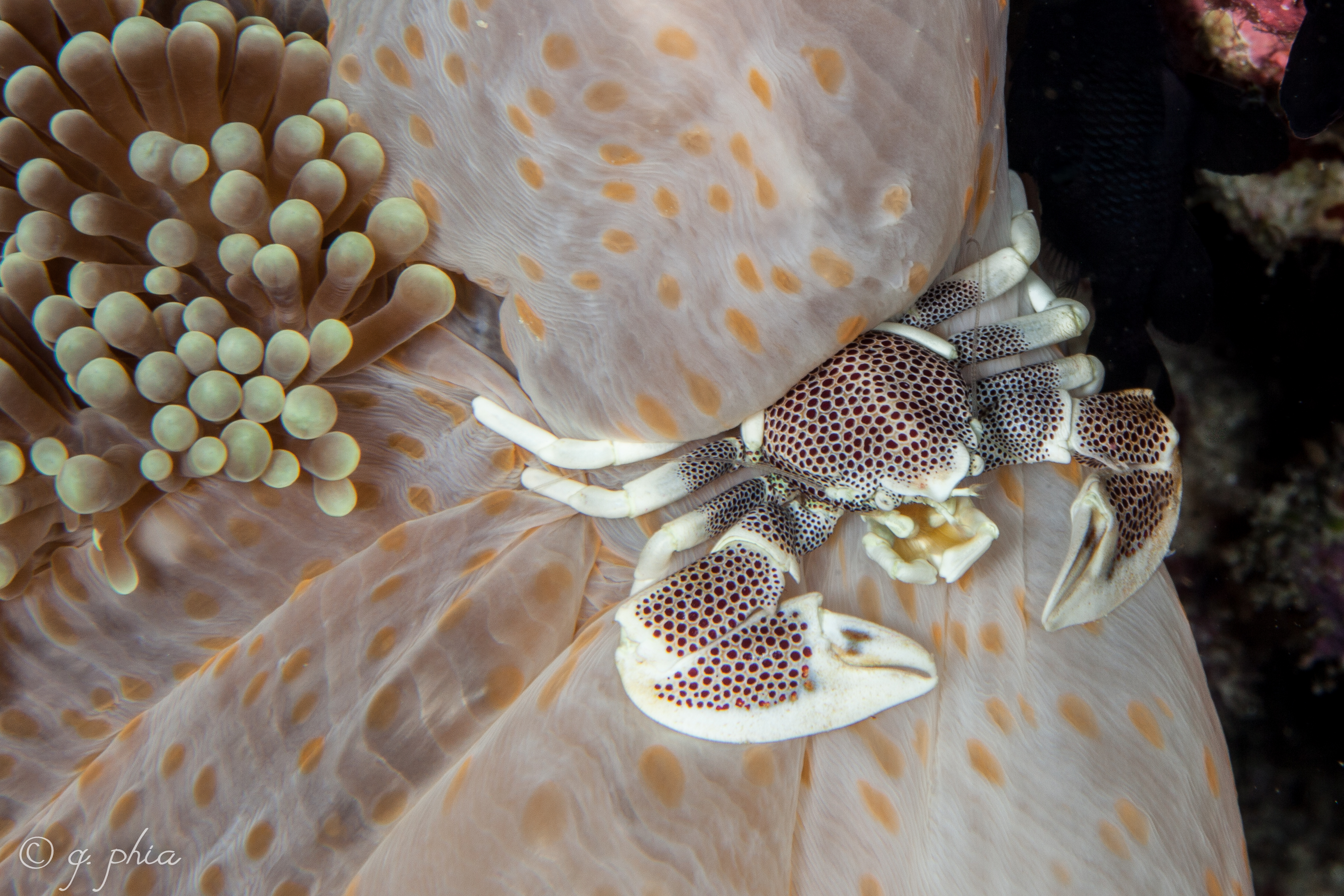
Neopetrolisthes maculatus at Wakatobi National Park, 2015

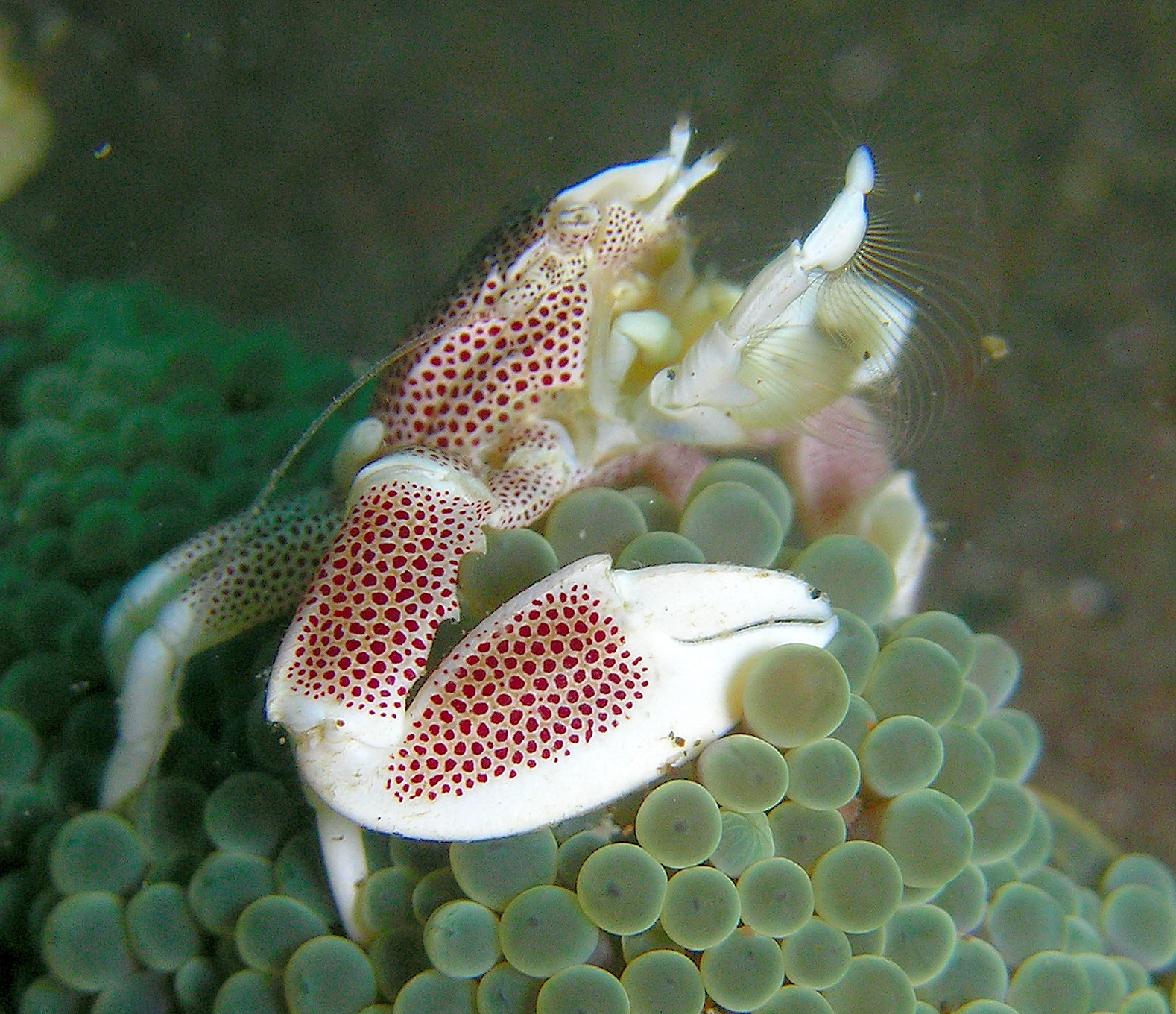
Close up of chelipeds of Neopetrolisthes maculatus, 2006

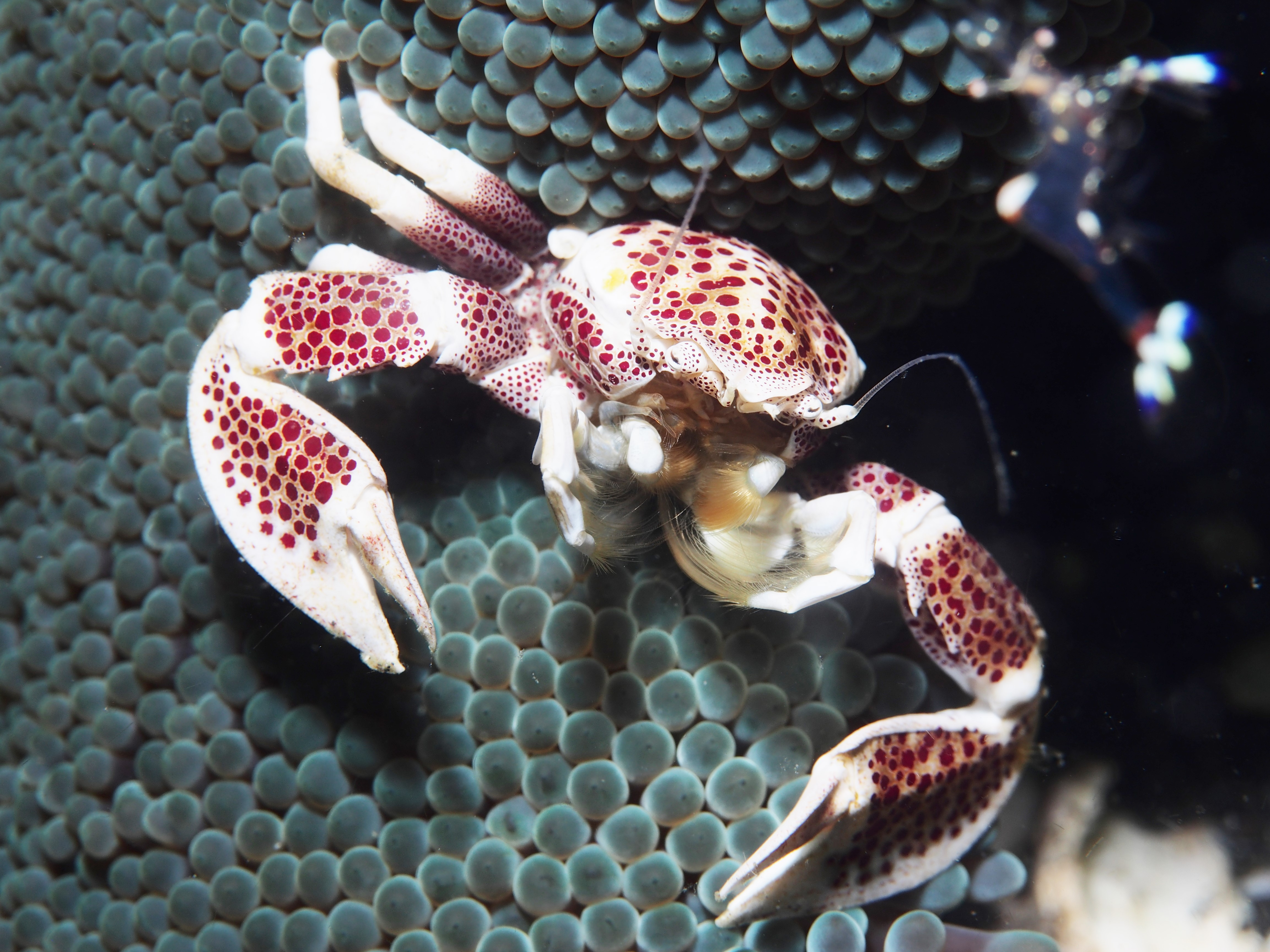
Close up of Neopetrolisthes maculatus at Lembeh, Indonesia, 2016

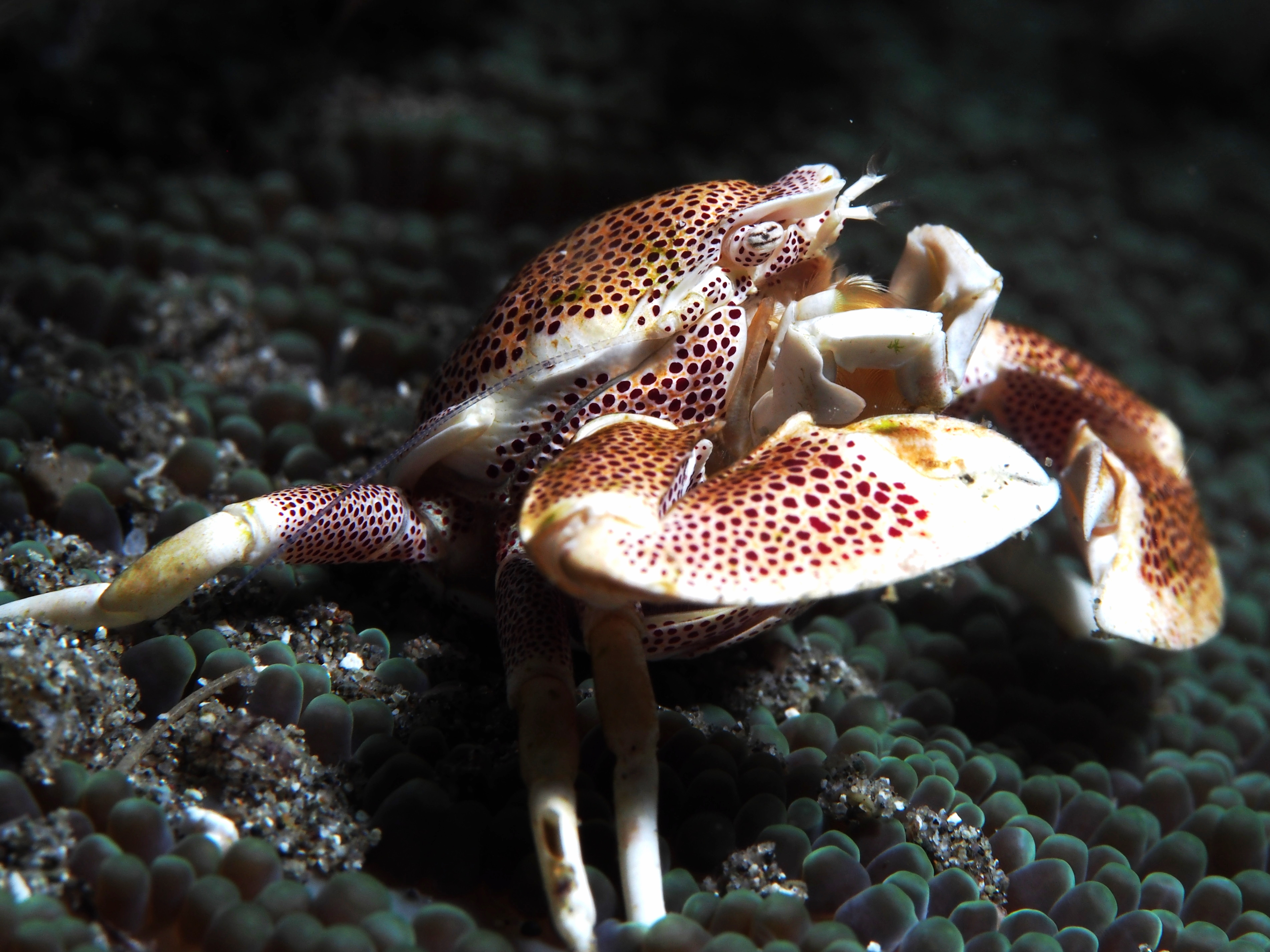
Chelipeds of Neopetrolisthes maculatus at Anilao, Philippines, 2014

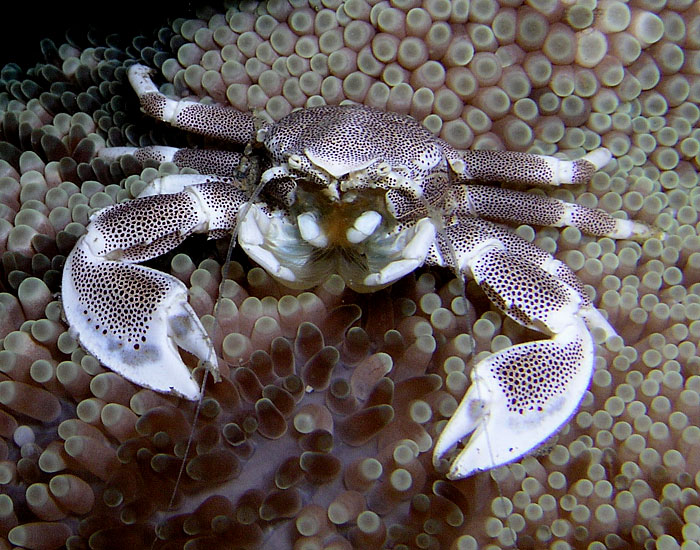
Neopetrolisthes maculatus pouncing on carpet anemone, 2004

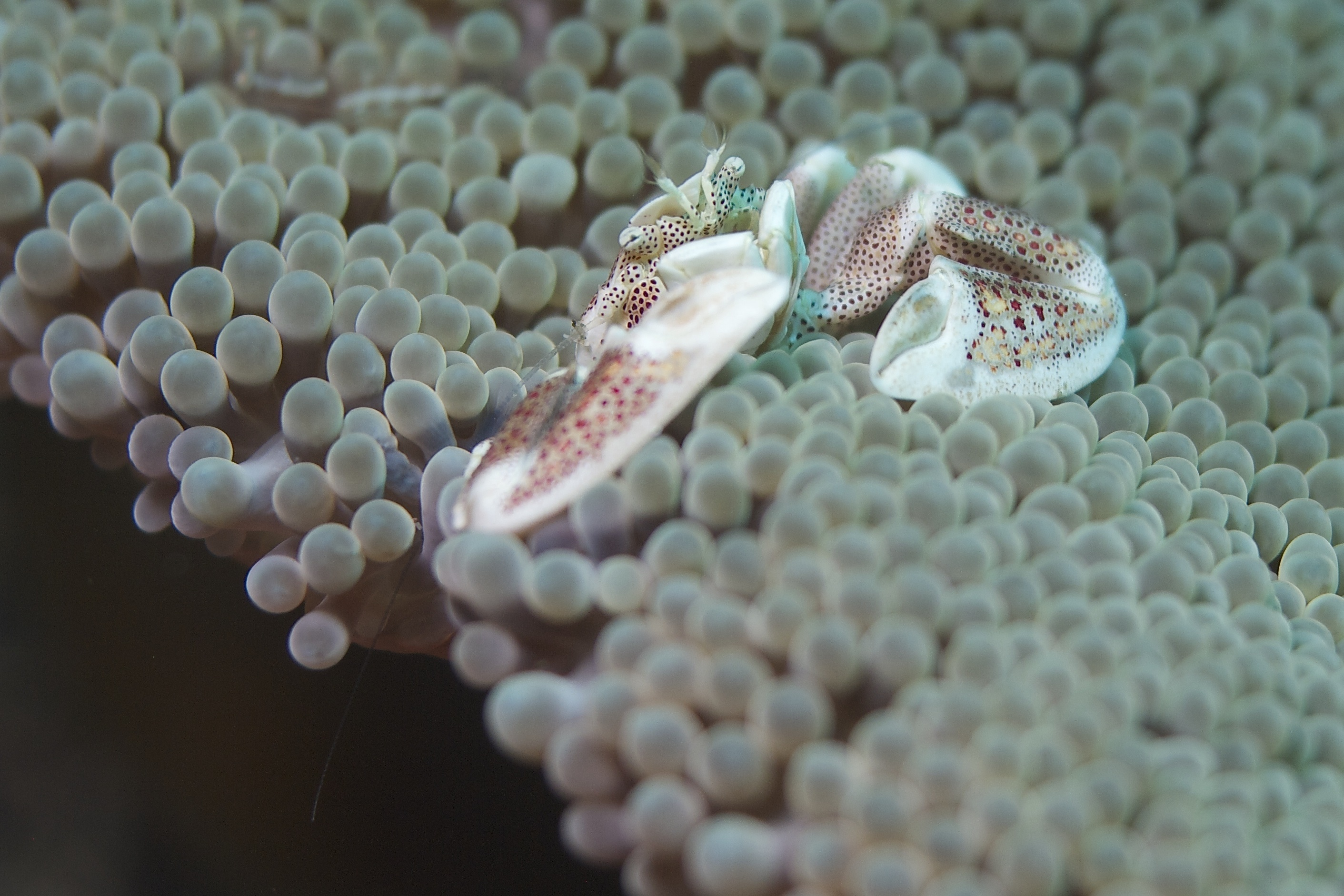
Neopetrolisthes maculatus near Sorong, Indonesia, 2015
