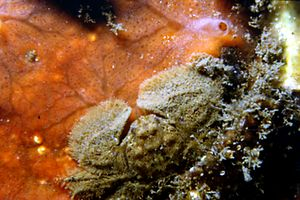

Scientific classification
- Kingdom: Animalia
- Phylum: Arthropoda
- Clade: Pancrustacea
- Class: Malacostraca
- Order: Decapoda
- Suborder: Pleocyemata
- Infraorder: Anomura
- Family: Porcellanidae
- Genus: Porcellana
- Species: P. platycheles

Binomial name
- Porcellana platycheles (Pennant, 1777)

Synonyms
- Cancer platycheles Pennant, 1777; Porcellana paivacarvalhoi Rodriguez da Costa, 1968

= Porcellana platycheles =

Species of crustacean

Porcellana platycheles, the broad-clawed porcelain crab, is a species of porcelain crab from the family Porcellanidae. It is found on the coasts of the eastern Atlantic Ocean and in the Mediterranean Sea

== Description ==
Porcellana platycheles may attain a length of 15 millimetres (0.59 in). This species has wide, flattened front claws and two long antennae. It is greenish-brown on its back while the belly is off white. It has a small abdomen which it tucks under its carapace. The last pair of legs are highly reduced and are normally hidden making the crab appear to have only three pairs of walking legs. The body is flattened and the legs end in sharp claws, which are used to grip the underside of the rocks they live under. Porcelain crabs are more closely related to lobsters and squat lobsters than "true" crabs, a relationship hinted at by their long antennae.

== Distribution ==
Porcellana platycheles is distributed from Norway to the Canary Islands and throughout the Mediterranean. In Britain it is widely distributed around all coastlines from Shetland to Scilly.

== Habitat and biology ==
Porcellana platycheles are found beneath rocks and boulders on rocky coasts. It is mainly found where there is mud and gravel in the mid to lower intertidal zones but is occasionally found as low as the shallow subtidal zone. It is a filter-feeding crab, using specially adapted hairs on its mouthparts to filter plankton from the water and it feeds on carrion and other organic debris. This crab needs a habitat with organic matter and has a preference for more sheltered shores, particularly where there has been material deposited among the rocks.
