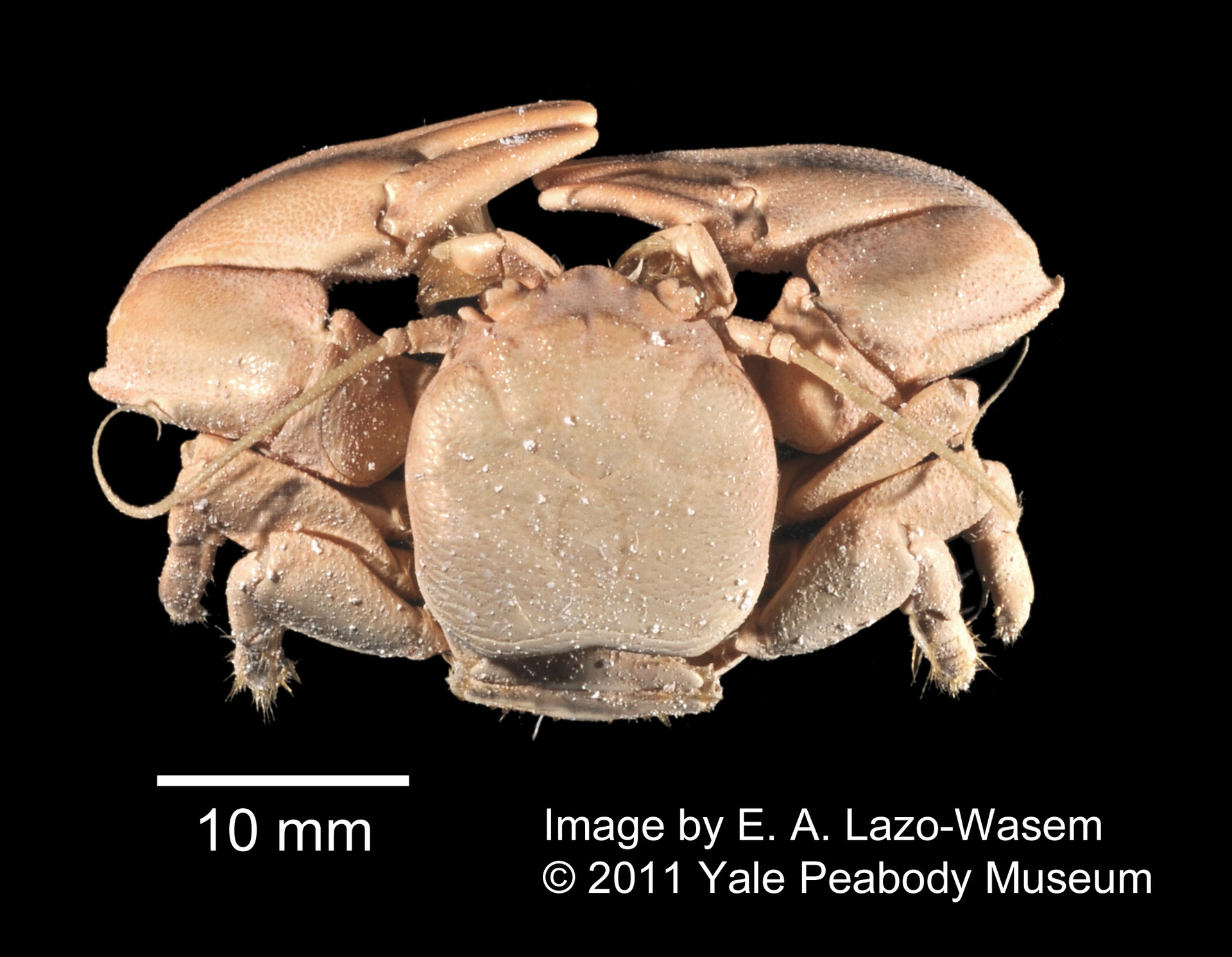
Petrolisthes eriomerus

Scientific classification
- Domain: Eukaryota
- Kingdom: Animalia
- Phylum: Arthropoda
- Class: Malacostraca
- Order: Decapoda
- Suborder: Pleocyemata
- Infraorder: Anomura
- Family: Porcellanidae
- Genus: Petrolisthes
- Species: P. eriomerus

Binomial name
- Petrolisthes eriomerus Stimpson, 1871

= Petrolisthes eriomerus =

Species of crustacean

Petrolisthes eriomerus is a species of marine porcelain crab found in the eastern Pacific Ocean. It is commonly known as the flattop crab. It is a flattened, rounded animal, with a carapace up to 20 mm (0.8 in) across. It is a filter feeder, and also sweeps food from rocks.

== Description ==
Porcelain crabs differs from true crabs in having four rather than five pereiopods or walking limbs normally visible, and are more closely related to king crabs and hermit crabs. This small porcelain crab has a carapace up to 20 millimetres (0.79 in) wide with a rounded outline. The body, limbs and claws are flattened dorsally. There are a pair of long antennae just beside the eyes. The broad carpi of the claw-bearing chelipeds have parallel sides and are twice as long as they are wide. These features distinguishes it from the otherwise similar Petrolisthes cinctipes. The chelipeds are armed with claws usually of similar size which are half as long again as the length of the carpus and disproportionally large. The second and fourth pereiopods end in a pointed dactyl or moveable finger and the fifth is rudimentary and tucked under the abdomen. There are uropods attached to the abdomen which is long and is folded under the thorax. The limbs are covered in tufts of setae which are most noticeable when the animal is underwater. This porcelain crab is mainly reddish-brown or blueish-grey but the palps, some of the mouthparts and the knuckles of the cheliped dactyls are blue.

== Distribution and habitat ==
This crab is found on the shore and at depths of up to 90 metres (300 ft) on the western coast of North America from California to Alaska. It prefers areas with strong currents and can be found under rocks, especially those embedded in sand or shingle, among seaweed and in beds of mussels on both exposed and sheltered coasts.

== Biology ==
P. eriomerus is a filter feeder subsisting largely on diatoms which it gathers with the setae on its mouthparts. It also uses the tufts of setae on its chelipeds to sweep deposits off the surfaces of rocks for consumption.

Females usually have two broods per year. The larvae are free living and form part of the zooplankton. The zoeal larval stage has a characteristic long rostrum. Males, females and a few juveniles may congregate in small groups, and in these, only the dominant males are likely to mate.

Like other porcelain crabs, P. eriomerus sometimes casts off limbs as a diversion when trying to escape from a predator, a process known as autotomy. In this species however, the claws of the cast limb continue to grip vigorously after separation. The limb is regrown by the porcelain crab over the period of several moults.
