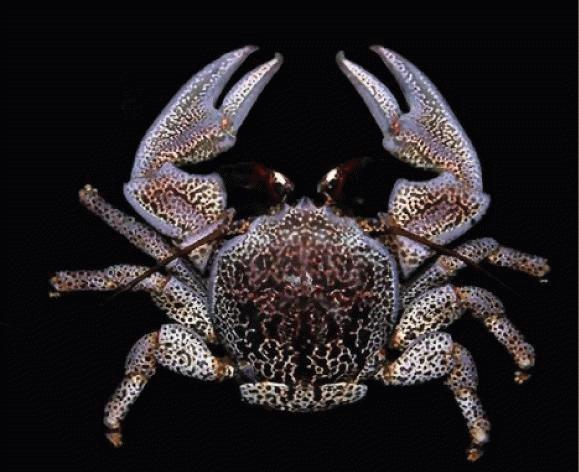
- Allopetrolisthes punctatus

Scientific classification
- Domain: Eukaryota
- Kingdom: Animalia
- Phylum: Arthropoda
- Class: Malacostraca
- Order: Decapoda
- Suborder: Pleocyemata
- Infraorder: Anomura
- Family: Porcellanidae
- Genus: Allopetrolisthes; Haig, 1960

= Allopetrolisthes =

Genus of crustaceans

Allopetrolisthes is a genus of porcelain crabs, comprising three species:

- Allopetrolisthes angulosus (Guérin, 1835)
- Allopetrolisthes punctatus (Guérin, 1835)
- Allopetrolisthes spinifrons (H. Milne-Edwards, 1837)
