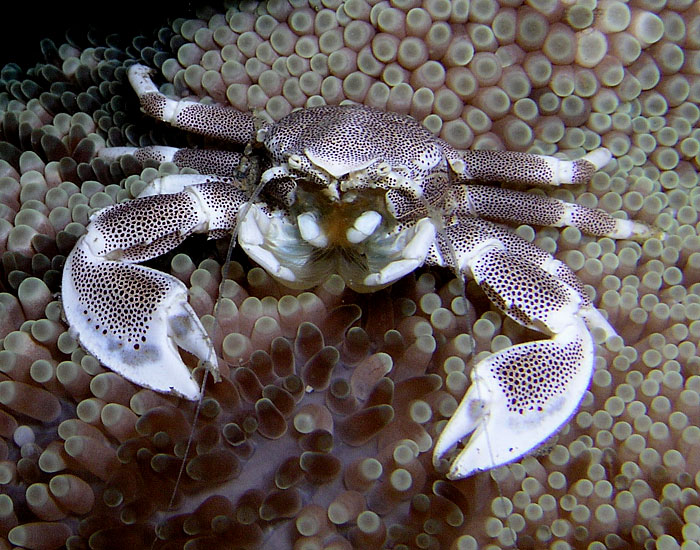
- Neopetrolisthes maculatus

Scientific classification
- Domain: Eukaryota
- Kingdom: Animalia
- Phylum: Arthropoda
- Class: Malacostraca
- Order: Decapoda
- Suborder: Pleocyemata
- Infraorder: Anomura
- Family: Porcellanidae
- Genus: Neopetrolisthes; Miyake, 1937

Type species
- Neopetrolisthes ohshimai Miyake, 1937

= Neopetrolisthes =

Genus of crustaceans

Neopetrolisthes is a genus of porcelain crabs that live on sea anemones, and contains the following three species:

- Neopetrolisthes maculatus (H. Milne-Edwards, 1837) – N. ohshimai Miyake, 1937 is a subjective synonym
- Neopetrolisthes alobatus (Laurie, 1926)
- Neopetrolisthes spinatus Osawa & Fujita, 2001
