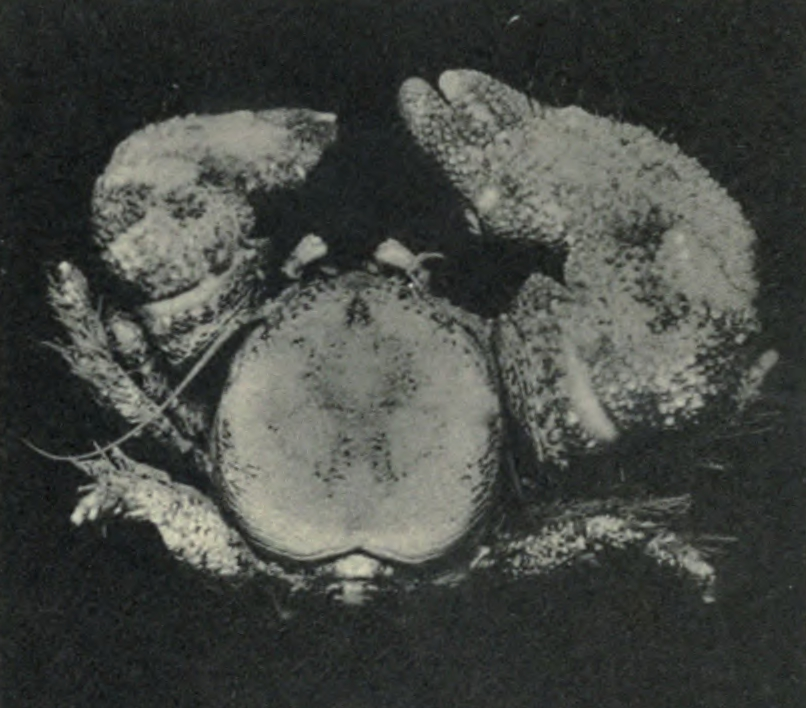
- Male Pachycheles rudis

Scientific classification
- Domain: Eukaryota
- Kingdom: Animalia
- Phylum: Arthropoda
- Class: Malacostraca
- Order: Decapoda
- Suborder: Pleocyemata
- Infraorder: Anomura
- Family: Porcellanidae
- Genus: Pachycheles; Stimpson, 1858

= Pachycheles =

Genus of crustaceans

Pachycheles is a genus of porcelain crabs in the family Porcellanidae. There are more than 40 described species in Pachycheles.

== Species ==
These 47 species belong to the genus Pachycheles:

- Pachycheles ackieianus A.Milne Edwards
- Pachycheles ackleianus A. Milne-Edwards, 1880
- Pachycheles attaragos Harvey & de Santo, 1997
- Pachycheles barbatus A.Milne-Edwards, 1878
- Pachycheles bellus (Osorio, 1887)
- Pachycheles biocellatus (Lockington, 1878)
- Pachycheles calculosus Haig, 1960
- Pachycheles chacei Haig, 1956
- Pachycheles chubutensis Boschi, 1963
- Pachycheles crassus (A.Milne-Edwards, 1869)
- Pachycheles crinimanus Haig, 1960
- Pachycheles cristobalensis Gore, 1970
- Pachycheles dorsosulcatus Beschin & al., 2007
- Pachycheles granti Haig, 1965
- Pachycheles greeleyi (Rathbun, 1900)
- Pachycheles grossimanus (Guérin, 1835)
- Pachycheles hertwigi Balss, 1913
- Pachycheles holosericus Schmitt, 1921
- Pachycheles johnsoni Haig, 1965
- Pachycheles laevidactylus Ortmann, 1892
- Pachycheles latus Rathbun, 1918
- Pachycheles marcortezensis Glassell, 1936
- Pachycheles meloi Ferreira & Tavares, 2017
- Pachycheles monilifer (Dana, 1852)
- Pachycheles natalensis (Krauss, 1843)
- Pachycheles palpebrosus Glassell
- Pachycheles panamensis Faxon, 1893
- Pachycheles pectinicarpus Stimpson, 1858
- Pachycheles pilosus (H. Milne Edwards, 1837)
- Pachycheles pisoides (C. Heller, 1865)
- Pachycheles pubescens Holmes, 1900
- Pachycheles riisei (Stimpson, 1858)
- Pachycheles rudis Stimpson, 1859 (thickclaw porcelain crab)
- Pachycheles rugimanus A. Milne-Edwards, 1880
- Pachycheles sahariensis Monod, 1933
- Pachycheles serratus (Benedict, 1901)
- Pachycheles setiferous Yang, 1996
- Pachycheles setimanus (Lockington, 1878)
- Pachycheles spinidactylus Haig, 1957
- Pachycheles stevensii Stimpson, 1858
- Pachycheles subsetosus Haig, 1960
- Pachycheles susanae Gore & Abele, 1974
- Pachycheles tomentosus Henderson, 1893
- Pachycheles trichotus Haig, 1960
- Pachycheles tuerkayi Werding & Hiller, 2017
- Pachycheles velerae Haig, 1960
- Pachycheles vicarius Nobili, 1901
