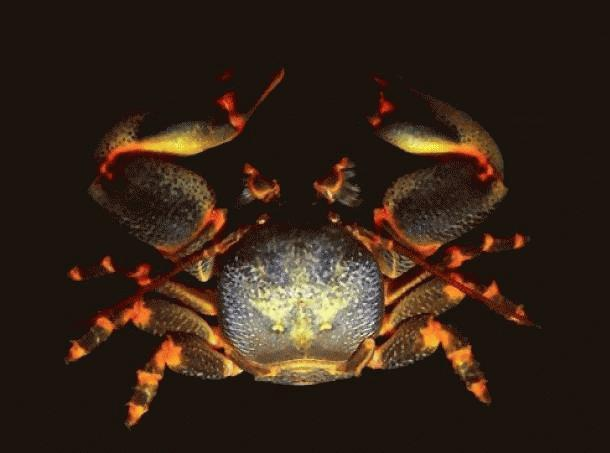

Scientific classification
- Domain: Eukaryota
- Kingdom: Animalia
- Phylum: Arthropoda
- Class: Malacostraca
- Order: Decapoda
- Suborder: Pleocyemata
- Infraorder: Anomura
- Family: Porcellanidae
- Genus: Petrolisthes
- Species: P. laevigatus

Binomial name
- Petrolisthes laevigatus (Guérin, 1835)

= Petrolisthes laevigatus =

Species of crustacean

Petrolisthes laevigatus is a species of porcelain crab found in Chile and Peru. Its carapace width is up to 2.5 cm. P. laevigatus lives under rocks in the middle and lower intertidal area. It feeds by filtering zooplankton.
