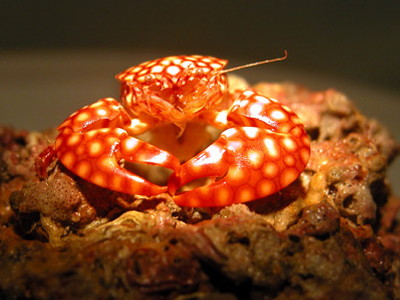

Scientific classification
- Domain: Eukaryota
- Kingdom: Animalia
- Phylum: Arthropoda
- Class: Malacostraca
- Order: Decapoda
- Suborder: Pleocyemata
- Infraorder: Anomura
- Family: Porcellanidae
- Genus: Porcellana
- Species: P. sayana

Binomial name
- Porcellana sayana (Leach, 1820)

Synonyms
- Porcellana sagrai Von Martens, 1872; Porcellana ocellata Gibbes, 1850; Porcellana robertsoni Henderson, 1888; Porcellana sagrai Guérin-Méneville, 1855; Porcellana sayii Gray, 1831 [misspelling]; Porcellana stimpsoni A. Milne-Edwards, 1880

= Porcellana sayana =

Species of crustacean

Porcellana sayana is a species of porcelain crab that lives in the western Atlantic Ocean, often as a commensal of hermit crabs. It is red with white spots, and has a characteristic bulge behind each claw.

== Distribution ==
Porcellana sayana is found along the western coast of the Atlantic Ocean, from Cape Hatteras (United States) to Brazil, including the Gulf of Mexico and the Caribbean Sea.

== Description ==
Porcellana sayana is 13 millimetres (0.51 in) long, and is red, with numerous whitish spots. It may be distinguished from other species by the form of the first pereiopod; the carpus (last segment before the claw) of that leg bears a lobe which projects forwards. It has a fringe of setae along the front of its claws, which it uses in filter feeding.

== Ecology ==
Porcellana sayana lives in shallow water, at depths of up to 92 metres (302 ft), among rocks and oyster shells, or as a commensal of the hermit crabs Pagurus pollicaris and Petrochirus diogenes. Like another porcelain crab, Petrolisthes galathinus, Porcellana sayana is parasitised by the bopyrid isopod Aporobopyrus curtatus, which lives in the porcelain crab's gill chamber.

== Taxonomy ==
Porcellana sayana was first described by William Elford Leach in 1820 as Pisidia sayana. Its common names include "spotted porcelain crab" and "Say's porcellanid".
