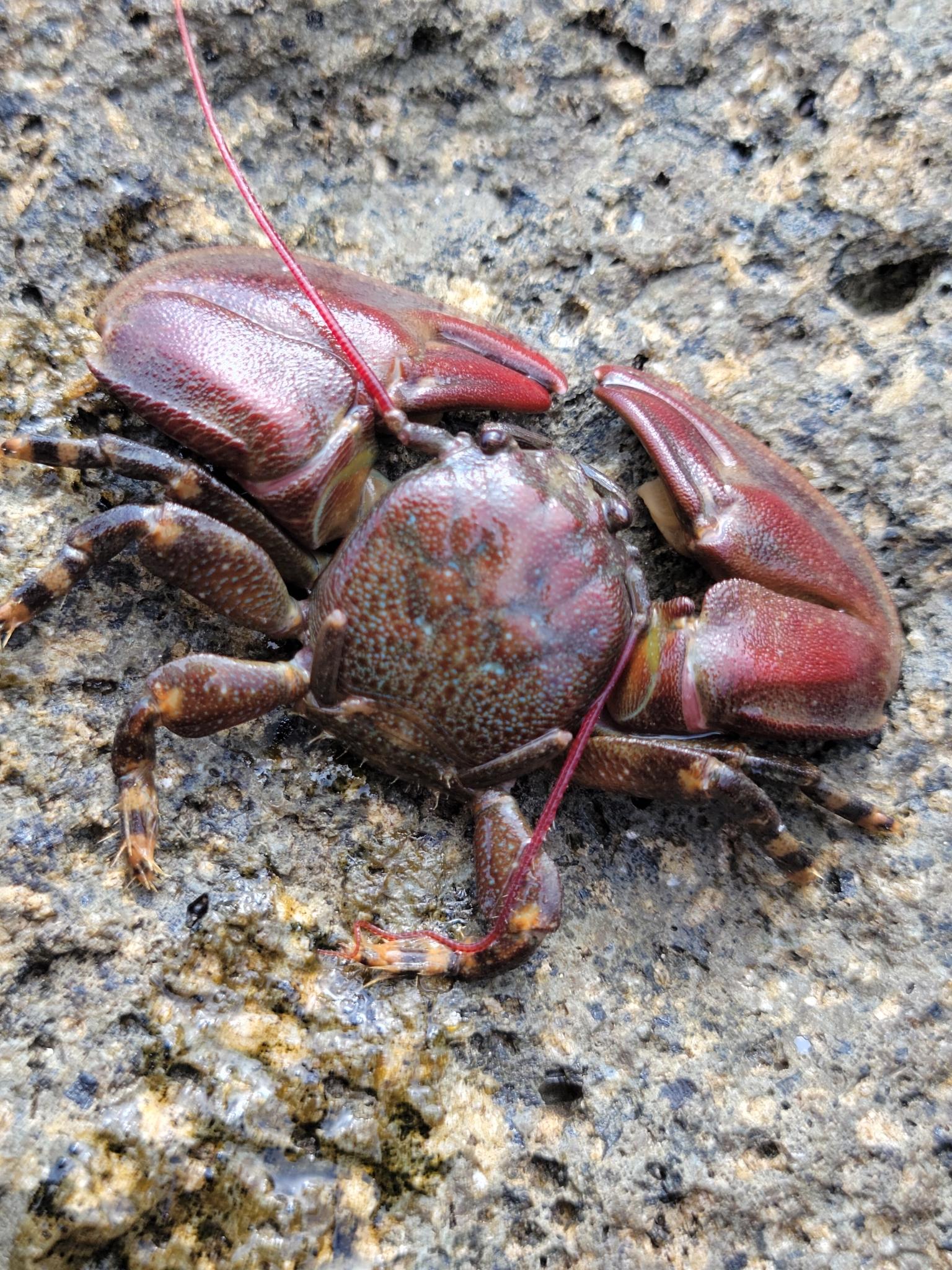
- Morro Bay, 2021

Conservation status
- Secure (NatureServe)

Scientific classification
- Kingdom: Animalia
- Phylum: Arthropoda
- Clade: Pancrustacea
- Class: Malacostraca
- Order: Decapoda
- Suborder: Pleocyemata
- Infraorder: Anomura
- Family: Porcellanidae
- Genus: Petrolisthes
- Species: P. cinctipes

Binomial name
- Petrolisthes cinctipes (J. W. Randall, 1840)

Synonyms
- Porcellana cinctipes Randall, 1840; Porcellana rupicola; Petrolisthes rupicolus

= Petrolisthes cinctipes =

Species of crustacean

Petrolisthes cinctipes, commonly known as the flat porcelain crab, is an abundant species of marine porcelain crab found in the upper and middle intertidal, primarily in mussel beds and rubble beds, along the eastern Pacific Ocean, from British Columbia to Mexico. This species was first described by John Witt Randall in 1840.

== Description ==
P. cinctipes has a flat carapace up to 24 mm in diameter. It is generally a dark blue-brown color, and more starkly blue around the time of molting. The front of its shell is triangular in shape and bends downward where a deep groove sits in the center. The species features a granular and bumpy texture across almost its entirety, including its chelipids. However, the chelae, more commonly understood as pincers, are smooth and have clusters of setae (hair-like bristles) in between them.

The species name cinctipes is derived from the Latin for "banded legs," since the legs of this species are blue banded with white. Unlike other sympatric species of Petrolisthes, this species has dark red antennal flagellae, and a distinct lobe on the inner margin of its carpus, which has non-parallel margins.

== Biology ==
P. cinctipes does not use its chelae (claws) for feeding. Like other porcelain crabs, P. cinctipes is a suspension-feeding crab that uses its maxillipeds (mouthparts) to sweep phytoplankton and other detritus from the water. It can voluntarily detach its claw through a reflex called autotomy, which it deploys in approximately 40% of predator attacks or more, especially among smaller female porcelain crabs. The claw stops pinching once it detaches, which is not the case for other species in the genus, like P. eriomerus. After autonomy, a membrane is sealed over the stump, and within a few weeks a small limb bud will form at the amputation site. After several molting cycles, the limb bud will retain its full size.

P. cinctipes generally reproduce all year round, except April, May, September, October and November. After breeding with 1-3 males, all of which may contribute to the female’s reproduction, female P. cinctipes carry a brood. The eggs measure just over 800µm in diameter and can feature a color that ranges from deep scarlet to maroon in early stages, later taking on a brownish hue as they mature.

Eggs hatch into zoea, or early-stage planktonic larvae with long spines, which the larvae use both for lateral swimming and to discourage predators. Zoeal larvae molt once before entering a post-larval stage as planktonic, filter feeding megalopae with fully developed appendages. In a laboratory study observing settlement behavior, it was found that prior to reaching the juvenile stage, megalopae tend to settle just 2-4 days when kept in close proximity to adult species, while those independent of the adults settled 2-3 weeks. Following settlement, they molt into the juvenile stage, whereby individuals generally lose the ability to swim as they reach the juvenile stage. However, adults, can swim with their ventral side up if they are forced to.

P. cinctipes’ epidermis goes through different molting periods throughout its lifetime. In the period of time just leading up to molting, the tissue beneath the crustacean’s outer shell naturally begins to separate from the shell. Simultaneously, the organism also regenerates parts of its body that may have been lost through autonomization, mentioned earlier in this article. After molting, the epidermis undergoes rapid cell growth which builds another initially soft outer shell. The shell eventually begins to harden and creates a restored protective layer.

== Research ==
P. cinctipes has been used as a model organism in studies of intertidal ecology, competition, and adaptation to stressors like acidification and temperature fluctuation. Its accessible habitat and abundance make it a common subject in marine biology teaching laboratories.
