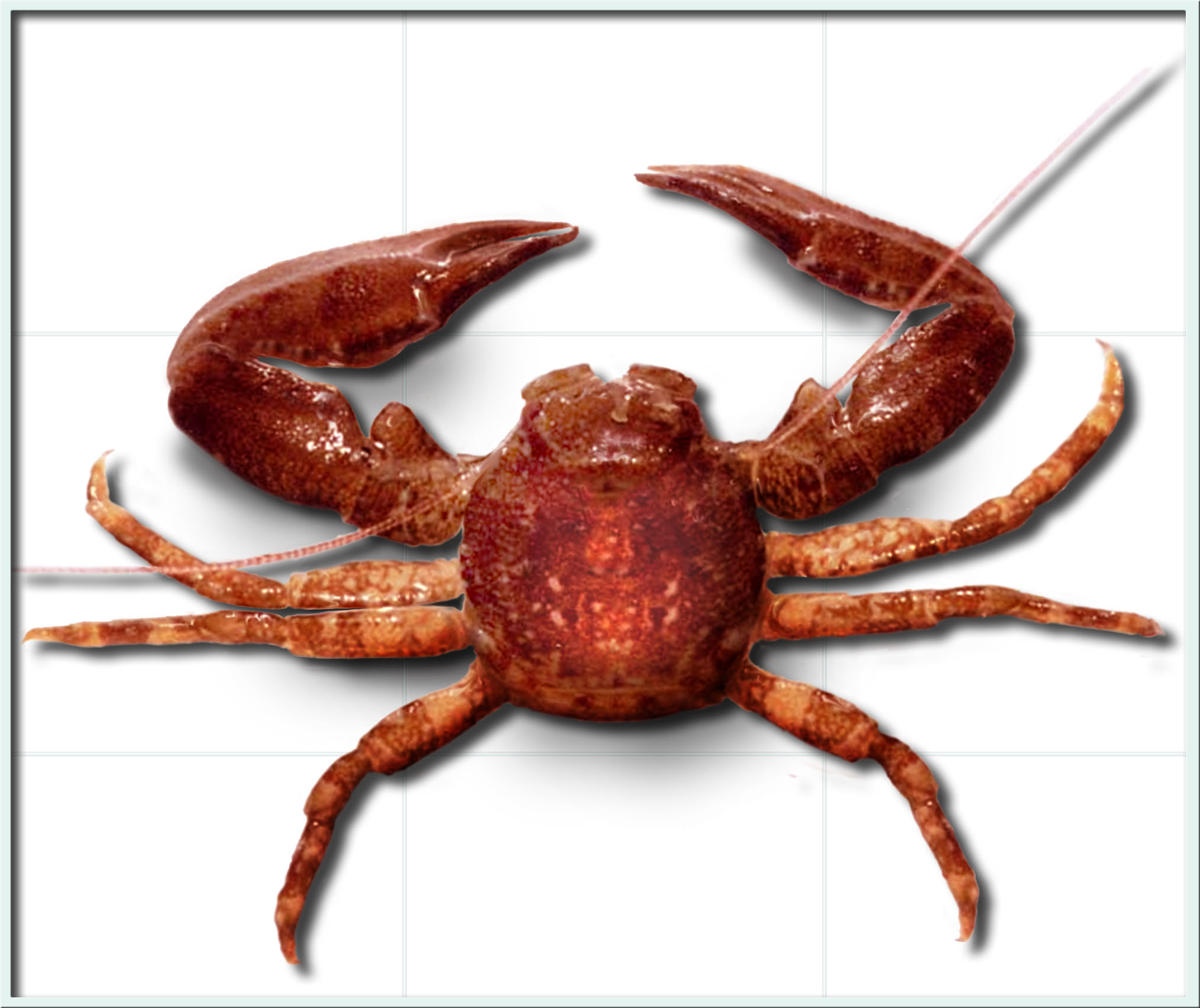
- Pisidia longicornis

Scientific classification
- Domain: Eukaryota
- Kingdom: Animalia
- Phylum: Arthropoda
- Class: Malacostraca
- Order: Decapoda
- Suborder: Pleocyemata
- Infraorder: Anomura
- Family: Porcellanidae
- Genus: Pisidia; Leach, 1820

Synonyms
- Streptochirus Stimpson, 1907

= Pisidia (crustacean) =

Genus of crustaceans

Pisidia is a genus of marine porcelain crabs, comprising the following species:

- Pisidia bluteli (Risso, 1816)
- Pisidia brasiliensis Haig, 1968
- Pisidia dehaanii (Krauss, 1843)
- Pisidia delagoae (Barnard, 1955)
- Pisidia dispar (Stimpson, 1858)
- Pisidia gordoni (Johnson, 1970)
- Pisidia inaequalis (Heller, 1861)
- Pisidia longicornis (Linnaeus, 1767)
- Pisidia longimana (Risso, 1816)
- Pisidia magdalenensis (Glassell, 1936)
- Pisidia serratifrons (Stimpson, 1858)
- Pisidia streptocheles (Stimpson, 1858)
- Pisidia striata Yang & Sun, 1990
- Pisidia variabilis (Yang & Sun, 1985)
