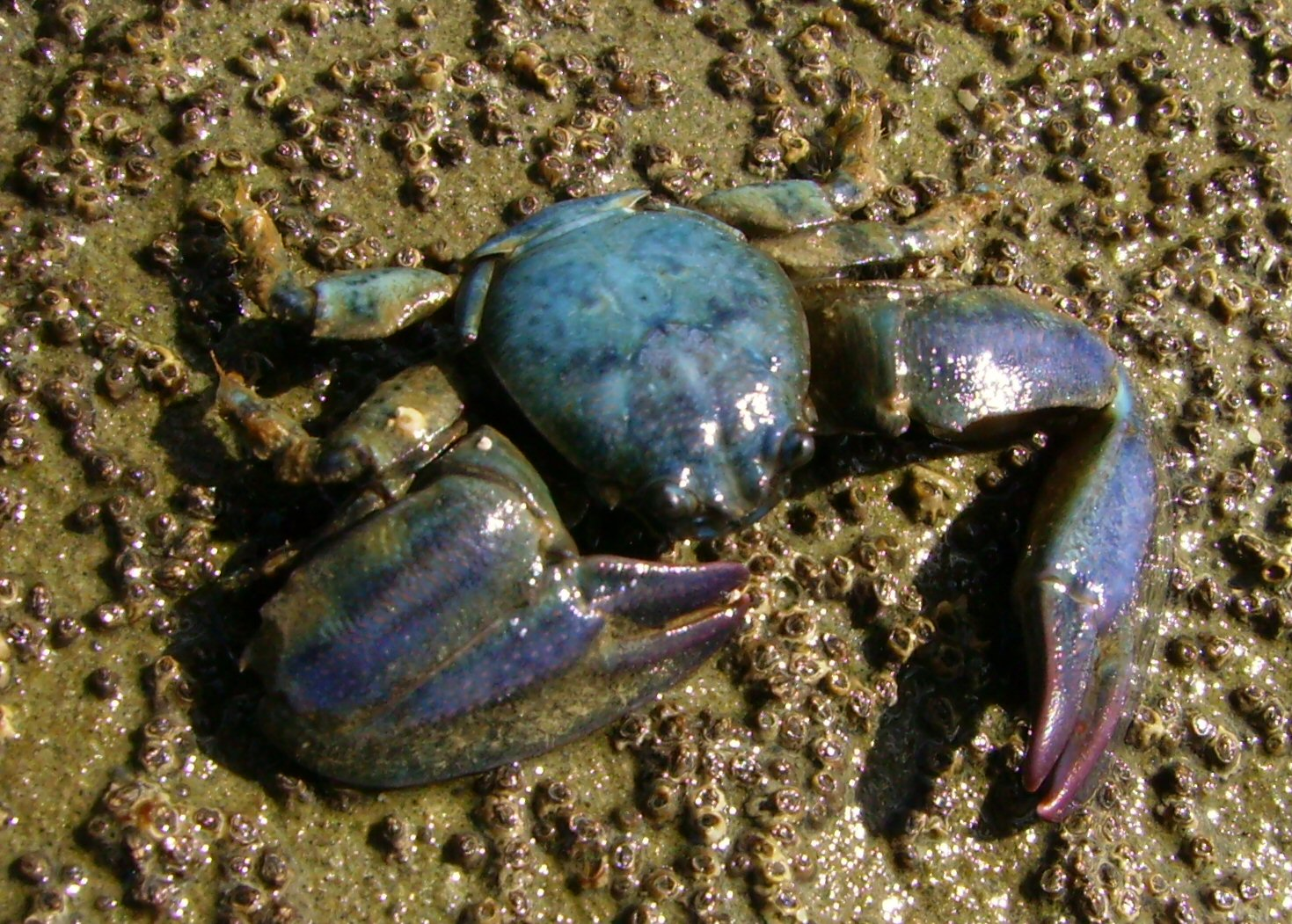
- New Zealand half crab, P. elongatus

Scientific classification
- Domain: Eukaryota
- Kingdom: Animalia
- Phylum: Arthropoda
- Class: Malacostraca
- Order: Decapoda
- Suborder: Pleocyemata
- Infraorder: Anomura
- Family: Porcellanidae
- Genus: Petrolisthes; Stimpson, 1858

Type species
- Porcellana violacea Guérin, 1829

= Petrolisthes =

Genus of crustaceans

Petrolisthes is a genus of marine porcelain crabs, containing these extant species:

- Petrolisthes aegyptiacus Werding & Hiller, 2007
- Petrolisthes agassizii Faxon, 1893
- Petrolisthes amoenus (Guérin-Méneville, 1855)
- Petrolisthes armatus (Gibbes, 1850)
- Petrolisthes artifrons Haig, 1960
- Petrolisthes bifidus Werding & Hiller, 2004
- Petrolisthes bispinosus Borradaile, 1900
- Petrolisthes bolivarensis Werding & Kraus, 2003
- Petrolisthes borradailei Kropp, 1984
- Petrolisthes boscii (Audouin, 1826)
- Petrolisthes brachycarpus Sivertsen, 1933
- Petrolisthes cabrilloi Glassell, 1945
- Petrolisthes caribensis Werding, 1983
- Petrolisthes carinipes (Heller, 1861)
- Petrolisthes celebesensis Haig, 1981
- Petrolisthes cinctipes (J. W. Randall, 1840)
- Petrolisthes coccineus (Owen, 1839)
- Petrolisthes cocoensis Haig, 1960
- Petrolisthes columbiensis Werding, 1983
- Petrolisthes crenulatus Lockington, 1878
- Petrolisthes decacanthus Ortmann, 1897
- Petrolisthes desmarestii (Guérin, 1835)
- Petrolisthes dissimulatus Gore, 1983
- Petrolisthes donadio Hiller & Werding, 2007
- Petrolisthes donanensis Osawa, 1997
- Petrolisthes edwardsii (de Saussure, 1853)
- Petrolisthes eldredgei Haig & Kropp, 1987
- Petrolisthes elegans Haig, 1981
- Petrolisthes elongatus (H. Milne-Edwards, 1837)
- Petrolisthes eriomerus Stimpson, 1871
- Petrolisthes extremus Kropp & Haig, 1994
- Petrolisthes fimbriatus Borradaile, 1898
- Petrolisthes galapagensis Haig, 1960
- Petrolisthes galathinus (Bosc, 1802)
- Petrolisthes gertrudae Werding, 1996
- Petrolisthes glasselli Haig, 1957
- Petrolisthes gracilis Stimpson, 1859
- Petrolisthes granulosus (Guérin, 1835)
- Petrolisthes haigae Chace, 1962
- Petrolisthes haplodactylus Haig, 1988
- Petrolisthes hastatus Stimpson, 1858
- Petrolisthes haswelli Miers, 1884
- Petrolisthes heterochrous Kropp, 1986
- Petrolisthes hians Nobili, 1901
- Petrolisthes hirtipes Lockington, 1878
- Petrolisthes hirtispinosus Lockington, 1878
- Petrolisthes hispaniolensis Werding & Hiller, 2005
- Petrolisthes holotrichus Nobili, 1901
- Petrolisthes japonicus (De Haan, 1849
- Petrolisthes jugosus Streets, 1872
- Petrolisthes kranjiensis Johnson, 1970
- Petrolisthes laevigatus (Guérin, 1835)
- Petrolisthes lamarckii (Leach, 1820)
- Petrolisthes lazarus Ferreira, Santana-Moreno & Anker, 2020
- Petrolisthes leptocheles (Heller, 1861)
- Petrolisthes lewisi (Glassell, 1936)
- Petrolisthes limicola Haig, 1988
- Petrolisthes lindae Gore & Abele, 1974
- Petrolisthes magdalenensis Werding, 1978
- Petrolisthes manimaculis Glassell, 1945
- Petrolisthes marginatus Stimpson, 1859
- Petrolisthes masakii Miyake, 1943
- Petrolisthes melini Miyake & Nakasone, 1966
- Petrolisthes mesodactylon Kropp, 1984
- Petrolisthes militaris (Heller, 1862)
- Petrolisthes miyakei Kropp, 1984
- Petrolisthes moluccensis (De Man, 1888)
- Petrolisthes monodi Chace, 1956
- Petrolisthes nanshensis Yang, 1996
- Petrolisthes nigrunguiculatus Glassell, 1936
- Petrolisthes nobilii Haig, 1960
- Petrolisthes novaezelandiae Filhol, 1885
- Petrolisthes obtusifrons Miyake, 1937
- Petrolisthes ornatus Paul’son, 1875
- Petrolisthes ortmanni Nobili, 1901
- Petrolisthes perdecorus Haig, 1981
- Petrolisthes platymerus Haig, 1960
- Petrolisthes politus (Gray, 1831)
- Petrolisthes polymitus Glassell, 1937
- Petrolisthes pubescens Stimpson, 1858
- Petrolisthes quadratus Benedict, 1901
- Petrolisthes rathbunae Schmitt, 1921
- Petrolisthes robsonae Glassell, 1945
- Petrolisthes rosariensis Werding, 1982
- Petrolisthes rufescens (Heller, 1861)
- Petrolisthes sanfelipensis Glassell, 1936
- Petrolisthes sanmartini Werding & Hiller, 2002
- Petrolisthes scabriculus (Dana, 1852)
- Petrolisthes schmitti Glassell, 1936
- Petrolisthes squamanus Osawa, 1996
- Petrolisthes teres Melin, 1939
- Petrolisthes tiburonensis Glassell, 1936
- Petrolisthes tomentosus (Dana, 1852)
- Petrolisthes tonsorius Haig, 1960
- Petrolisthes tridentatus Stimpson, 1859
- Petrolisthes trilobatus Osawa, 1996
- Petrolisthes tuberculatus (Guérin, 1835)
- Petrolisthes tuberculosus (H. Milne-Edwards, 1837)
- Petrolisthes unilobatus Henderson, 1888
- Petrolisthes violaceus (Guérin, 1831)
- Petrolisthes virgatus Paul’son, 1875
- Petrolisthes zacae Haig, 1968
