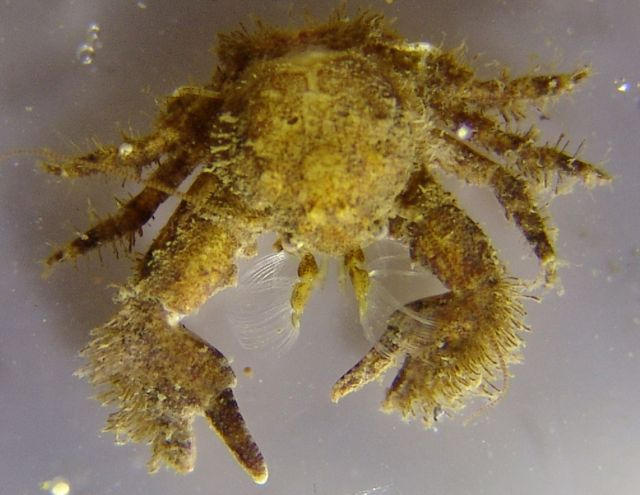
- Porcellana platycheles

Scientific classification
- Kingdom: Animalia
- Phylum: Arthropoda
- Clade: Pancrustacea
- Class: Malacostraca
- Order: Decapoda
- Suborder: Pleocyemata
- Infraorder: Anomura
- Family: Porcellanidae
- Genus: Porcellana; Lamarck, 1801

= Porcellana =

Genus of crustaceans

Porcellana is a genus of decapod crustaceans in the widespread family Porcellanidae, the porcelain crabs, which superficially resemble true crabs. The genus Porcellana includes the following species:

- Porcellana africana Chace, 1956
- Porcellana cancrisocialis Glassell, 1936
- Porcellana caparti Chace, 1956
- Porcellana corbicola Haig, 1960
- Porcellana curvifrons Yang & Sun, 1990
- Porcellana elegans Chace, 1956
- Porcellana foresti Chace, 1956
- Porcellana habei Miyake, 1961
- Porcellana hancocki Glassell, 1938
- Porcellana lillyae Lemaitre & Campos, 2000
- Porcellana paguriconviva Glassell, 1936
- Porcellana persica Haig, 1966
- Porcellana platycheles (Pennant, 1777)
- Porcellana pulchra Stimpson, 1858
- Porcellana sayana (Leach, 1820)
- Porcellana sigsbeiana A. Milne-Edwards, 1880
