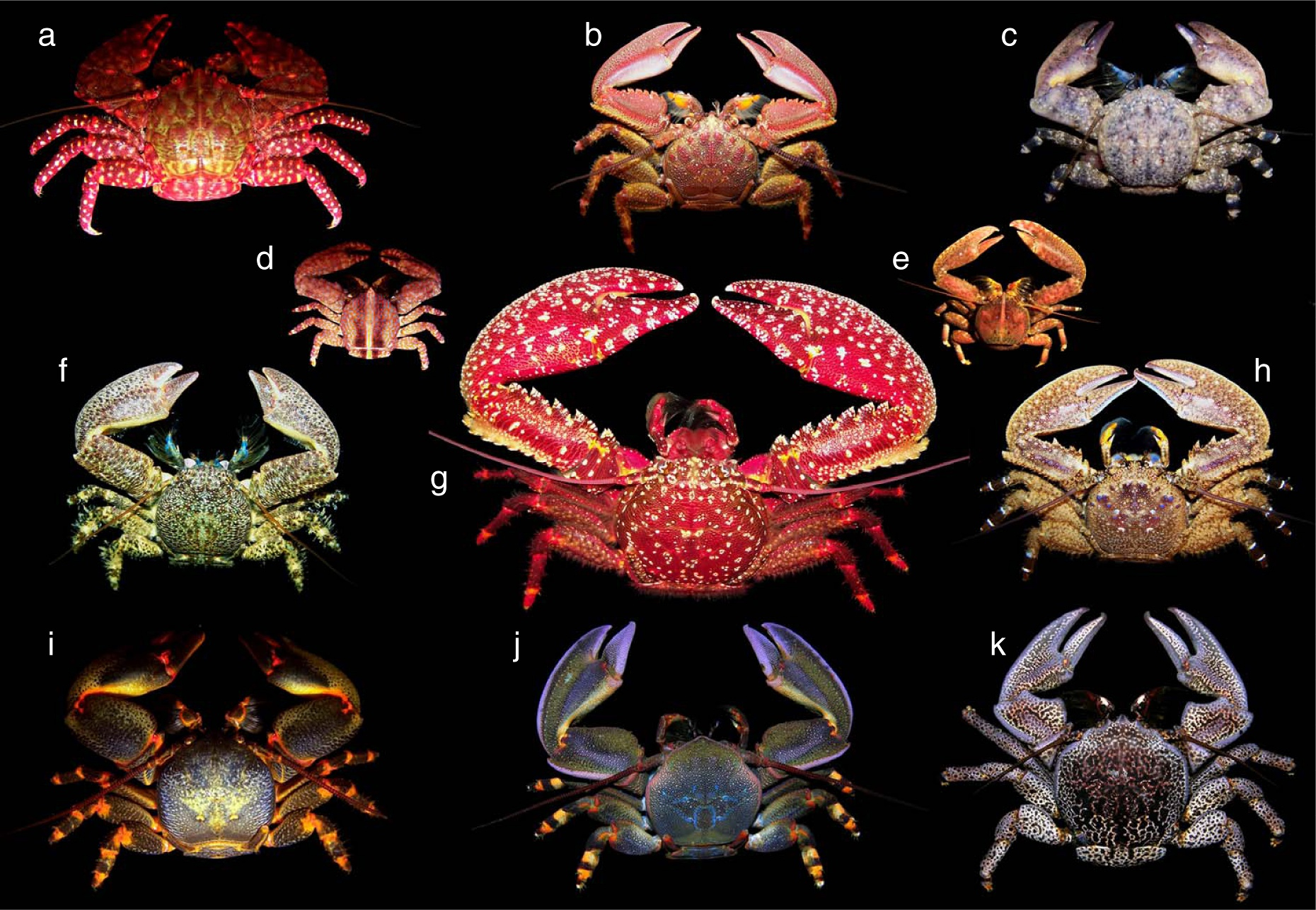
- Southeastern Pacific species of Petrolisthes, Allopetrolisthes and Liopetrolisthes

Scientific classification
- Kingdom: Animalia
- Phylum: Arthropoda
- Clade: Pancrustacea
- Class: Malacostraca
- Order: Decapoda
- Suborder: Pleocyemata
- Infraorder: Anomura
- Superfamily: Galatheoidea
- Family: Porcellanidae; Haworth, 1825

Genera
- See text

= Porcelain crab =

Porcelain crabs Temporal range: Tithonian–Recent

Family of crustaceans

Porcelain crabs are decapod crustaceans in the widespread family Porcellanidae, which superficially resemble true crabs. They have flattened bodies as an adaptation for living in rock crevices. They are delicate, readily losing limbs when attacked, and use their large claws for maintaining territories. They first appeared in the Tithonian age of the Late Jurassic epoch, 145–152 million years ago.

== Description ==
Porcelain crabs are small, usually with body widths less than 15 millimetres (9/16 inch). They share the general body plan of a squat lobster, but their bodies are more compact and flattened, an adaptation for living and hiding under rocks. Porcelain crabs are quite fragile animals, and often shed their limbs to escape predators, hence their name. The lost appendage can grow back over several moults. Porcelain crabs have large chelae (claws), which are used for territorial struggles, but not for catching food. The fifth pair of pereiopods is reduced and used for cleaning. Porcelain crabs can be distinguished from true crabs by the apparent number of walking legs (three instead of four pairs; the fourth pair is reduced and held against the carapace), and the long antennae originating on the front outside of the eyestalks. The abdomen of the porcelain crab is long and folded underneath it, free to move.

== Biogeography and ecology ==
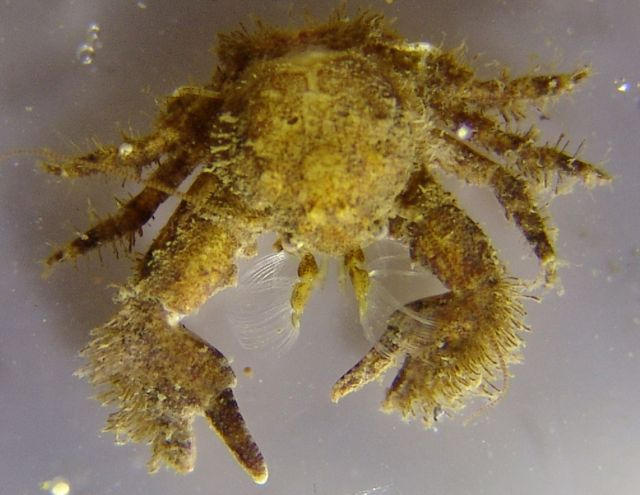
Porcellana platycheles

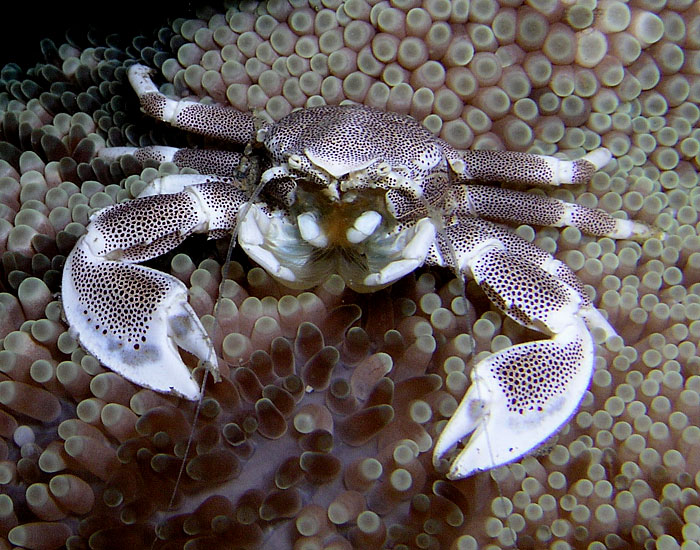
Neopetrolisthes maculatus

Porcelain crabs live in all the world's oceans, except the Arctic Ocean and the Antarctic. They are common under rocks, and can often be found and observed on rocky beaches and shorelines, startled creatures scurrying away when a stone is lifted. They feed by combing plankton and other organic particles from the water using long setae (feathery hair- or bristle-like structures) on the mouthparts.

Some of the common species of porcelain crabs in the Caribbean Sea are Petrolisthes quadratus, found in large numbers under rocks in the intertidal, and the red-and-white polka-dotted Porcellana sayana, which lives commensally within the shells inhabited by large hermit crabs. In Hong Kong, Petrolisthes japonicus is common.

== Evolution ==
Porcelain crabs are an example of convergent evolution commonly known as carcinisation, in which a decapod crustacean evolves to resemble a crab.

== Diversity ==
As of 2018, some 4723 extant species of porcelain crab had been described, divided among these 30 genera:

- Aliaporcellana Nakasone & Miyake, 1969
- Allopetrolisthes Haig, 1960
- Ancylocheles Haig, 1978
- Capilliporcellana Haig, 1978
- Clastotoechus Haig, 1960
- Enosteoides Johnson, 1970
- Euceramus Stimpson, 1860
- Eulenaios Ng & Nakasone, 1993
- Heteropolyonyx Osawa, 2001
- Heteroporcellana Haig, 1978
- Liopetrolisthes Haig, 1960
- Lissoporcellana Haig, 1978
- Madarateuchus Harvey, 1999
- Megalobrachium Stimpson, 1858
- Minyocerus Stimpson, 1858
- Neopetrolisthes Miyake, 1937
- Neopisosoma Haig, 1960
- Novorostrum Osawa, 1998
- Orthochela Glassell, 1936
- Pachycheles Stimpson, 1858
- Parapetrolisthes Haig, 1962
- Petrocheles Miers, 1876
- Petrolisthes Stimpson, 1858
- Pisidia Leach, 1820
- Polyonyx Stimpson, 1858
- Porcellana Lamarck, 1801
- Porcellanella White, 1852
- Pseudoporcellanella Sankarankutty, 1962
- Raphidopus Stimpson, 1858
- Ulloaia Glassell, 1938

The fossil record of porcelain crabs includes species of Pachycheles, Pisidia, Polyonyx, Porcellana, and a further six genera known only from fossils:

- Annieporcellana Fraaije et al., 2008
- Beripetrolisthes De Angeli & Garassino, 2002
- Eopetrolisthes De Angeli & Garassino, 2002
- Lobipetrolisthes De Angeli & Garassino, 2002
- Longoporcellana Müller & Collins, 1991

The earliest claimed porcelain crab fossil was Jurellana from the Tithonian aged Ernstbrunn Limestone of Austria. However, it was subsequently determined to be a true crab. With the new oldest porcelain crab being Vibrissalana from the same locality.
