= Galathea nexa =

Conservation status
- Not evaluated (IUCN 3.1)

Scientific classification
- Domain: Eukaryota
- Kingdom: Animalia
- Phylum: Arthropoda
- Class: Malacostraca
- Order: Decapoda
- Suborder: Pleocyemata
- Infraorder: Anomura
- Family: Galatheidae
- Genus: Galathea
- Species: G. nexa

Binomial name
- Galathea nexa Embleton, 1836

Species of crustacean

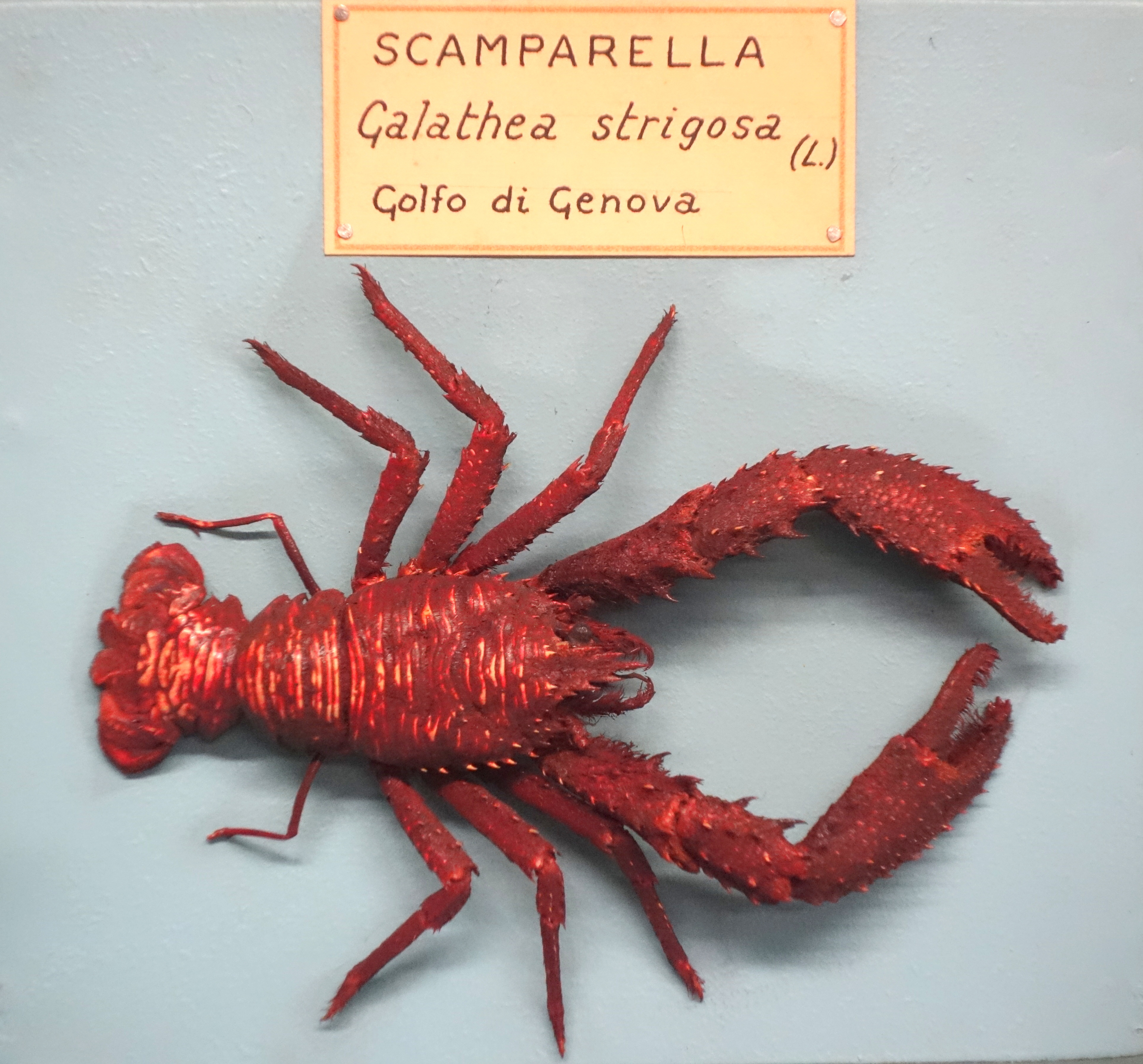
Galathea strigosa, a very similar species. G. nexa lacks the blue stripes.

Galathea nexa is a species of squat lobster in the family Galatheidae.

== Description ==
G. nexa males grow up to 4 cm (1.6 in), while the females are up to 3 cm (1.2 in). The first pair of legs have distinctive spikes on the second joint. It is reddish-green with some darker spots.

== Habitat ==
G. nexa is sometimes found in the subtidal zone, but is usually found deeper than 15 m (49 ft) in the seawater.

== Distribution ==
It is found in all European seas, from Norway to Great Britain and Ireland to the Mediterranean.

== Human use ==
It is fished and sold in some areas; in Belgium it is called galathée or springkrab.
