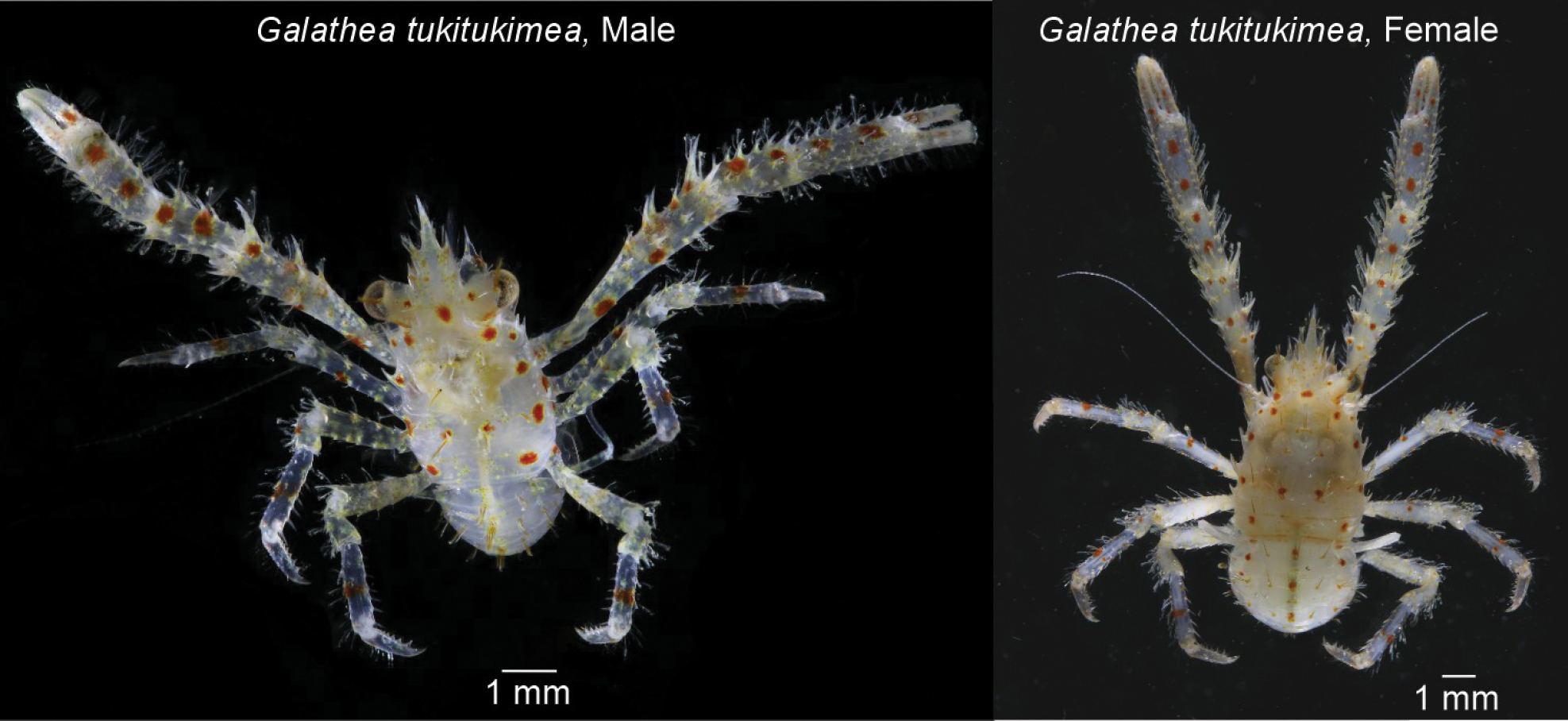

Scientific classification
- Kingdom: Animalia
- Phylum: Arthropoda
- Class: Malacostraca
- Order: Decapoda
- Suborder: Pleocyemata
- Infraorder: Anomura
- Family: Galatheidae
- Genus: Galathea
- Species: G. tukitukimea

Binomial name
- Galathea tukitukimea Gallardo, Asorey & Macpherson, 2025

= Galathea tukitukimea =

Species of crustacean

Galathea tukitukimea is a species of squat lobster in the family Galatheidae. Native to the southeastern Pacific Ocean, it inhabits deep waters surrounding Easter Island, where it appears to mimic and live in symbiosis with a species of sea urchin.

== Discovery and naming ==
The species was observed and collected in March 2024 during a survey by the RV Falkor (too) from the Schmidt Ocean Institute. The expedition conducted 11 dives using the ROV SuBastian inside the Chilean EEZ, around Easter Island, Isla Salas y Gómez, and on seamounts in the Rapa Nui Multiple Use Marine Coastal Protected Area and Motu Motiro Hiva Marine Park. Specimens were sent to the Chilean National Museum of Natural History and the Catholic University of the North, where morphological and molecular data were used to identify them as belonging to a new species.

The species' name was suggested by a Rapa Nui artist accompanying the expedition, and is derived from the Rapa Nui phrase tuki tuki mea (transl. "red dots"), in reference to the markings exhibited on the legs and carapace.

== Taxonomy ==
Galathea tukitukimea belongs to a species group within the Galathea genus identified by paired median protogastric and cardiac spines on the carapace. Morphological and molecular analysis indicates it is most closely related to Galathea profunda. Other members of the species group are found between Madagascar and Wallis and Futuna.

== Description ==
Specimens of G. tukitukimea are between 3.3 millimetres (0.13 in) (male holotype) and 4.4 millimetres (0.17 in) (female paratype) in length. The carapace is spiny and covered in setae. The species is white with yellow-orange blotches bearing red spots on the cephalothorax and legs. The dorsal surface is covered in iridescent setae.

== Distribution and ecology ==
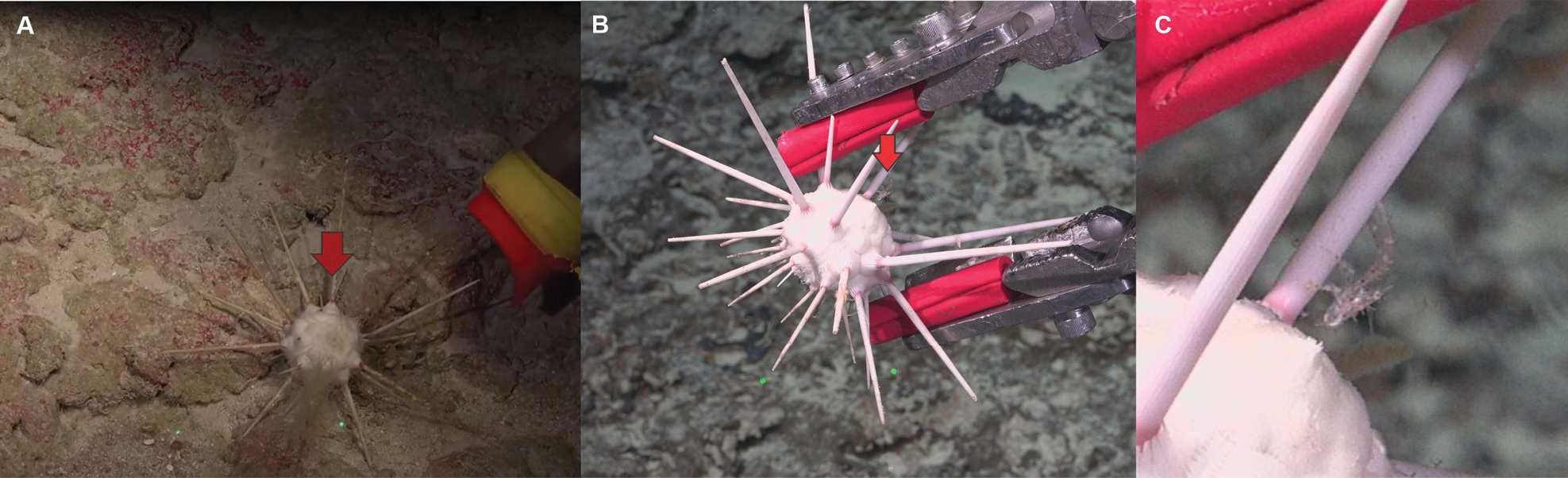
G. tukitukimea among the spines of the sea urchin Stereocidaris nascaensis in its natural habitat.

The species is found in the southeastern Pacific Ocean, on the Pukau seamount near Easter Island and in the Motu Motiro Hiva Marine Park surrounding Isla Salas y Gómez, at depths of 348–407 metres (1,142–1,335 ft). At the time of its discovery, it was the easternmost instance of a Galathea species to be found in the Pacific Ocean; the previous record was the discovery of Galathea senta near Oeno Island, an atoll in the Pitcairn Islands.

All collected specimens were found on rocky areas of the seabed, and were observed to be living among the spines of the pencil urchin Stereocidaris nascaensis. The researchers who discovered the species hypothesized that this was an example of mimicry and symbiosis.
