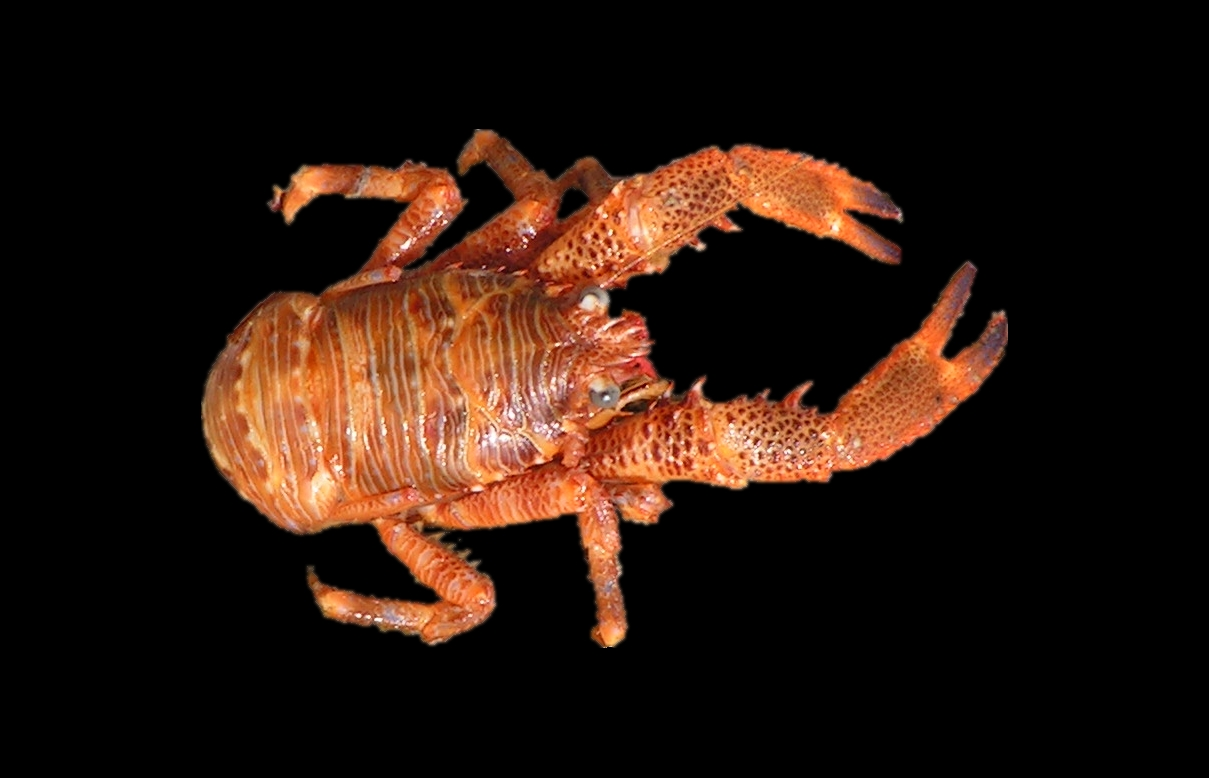

Scientific classification
- Domain: Eukaryota
- Kingdom: Animalia
- Phylum: Arthropoda
- Class: Malacostraca
- Order: Decapoda
- Suborder: Pleocyemata
- Infraorder: Anomura
- Family: Galatheidae
- Genus: Galathea
- Species: G. squamifera

Binomial name
- Galathea squamifera Leach, 1814

= Galathea squamifera =

Species of crustacean

Galathea squamifera, the black squat lobster, or Montagu's plated lobster, is a species of squat lobster that lives in the north-east Atlantic Ocean and Mediterranean Sea.

== Description ==
Adults are up to 65 millimetres (2.6 in) long, with a carapace 32 mm (1.3 in) long; the body is chestnut brown with a green tinge, and the spines projecting from the carapace are red at the tips. The rostrum is triangular in shape with four spines on either side. The first pair of pereiopods are 1½ times as long as the body, and have well-developed claws.

== Distribution and ecology ==
G. squamifera is found from Norway to the Azores and in the Mediterranean Sea, and is the most commonly found species of squat lobster on the shores of Northern Europe. It lives between the low water mark and depths of about 70 metres (230 ft), under stones and in rock fissures.

G. squamifera is chiefly nocturnal, and catches passing prey, such as small fish, with its claws. Species which feed on G. squamifera include the fishes Scorpaena porcus and Serranus atricauda.
