= Galathea balssi =

Scientific classification
- Kingdom: Animalia
- Phylum: Arthropoda
- Clade: Pancrustacea
- Class: Malacostraca
- Order: Decapoda
- Suborder: Pleocyemata
- Infraorder: Anomura
- Family: Galatheidae
- Genus: Galathea
- Species: G. balssi

Binomial name
- Galathea balssi Miyake & Baba, 1964

Species of crustacean

Galathea balssi is a species of squat lobster in the family Galatheidae. It is found throughout the tropical waters of the central Indo-Pacific. Galathea balssi is a small crustacean, growing up to 10 millimetres (0.39 in) in carapace length, including the rostrum.
