= G. intermedia =

G. intermedia may refer to:

- Galathea intermedia, a squat lobster species found in the north-eastern Atlantic Ocean
- Gallotia intermedia, the Tenerife speckled lizard or lagarto canario moteado, a recently discovered wall lizard species of Tenerife in the Canary Islands
- Garcinia intermedia, a tropical American fruit tree species
- Geranomyia intermedia, a crane fly species in the genus Geranomyia
- Gila intermedia, the Gila chub, a fish species found in Mexico and the United States

== See also ==
- Intermedia (disambiguation)
