= Hairy lobster =

Hairy lobster is the common name for multiple species of Decapoda including:

- Furry lobsters of the family Palinuridae
- Kiwa hirsuta, the yeti lobster, or yeti crab
- Lauriea siagiani, or pink hairy squat lobster, or fairy crab
