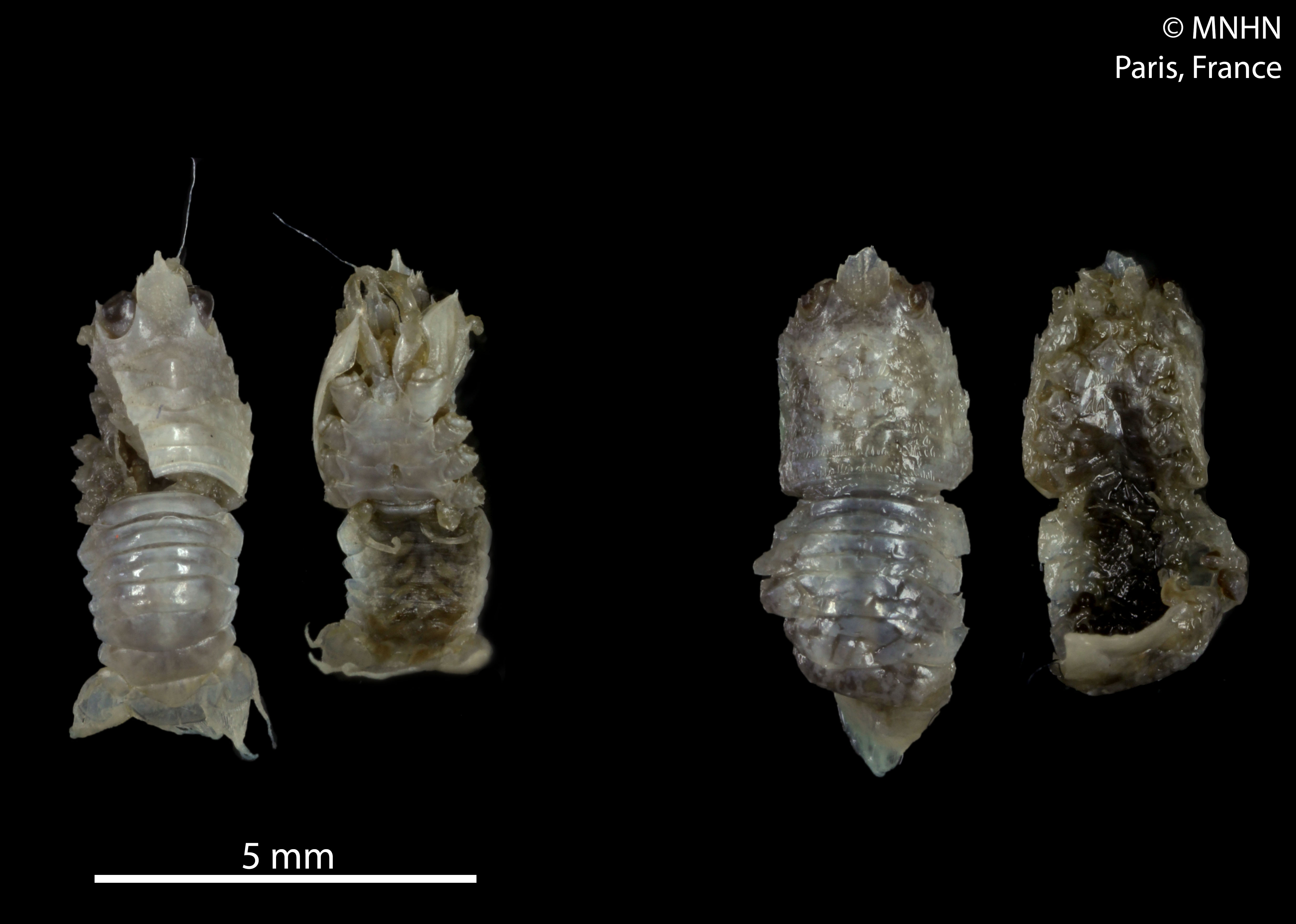
- Coralliogalathea humilis

Scientific classification
- Domain: Eukaryota
- Kingdom: Animalia
- Phylum: Arthropoda
- Class: Malacostraca
- Order: Decapoda
- Suborder: Pleocyemata
- Infraorder: Anomura
- Family: Galatheidae
- Genus: Coralliogalathea
- Species: C. humilis

Binomial name
- Coralliogalathea humilis (Nobili, 1906)

= Coralliogalathea humilis =

Species of crustacean

Coralliogalathea humilis is a species of squat lobster in the family Galatheidae.
