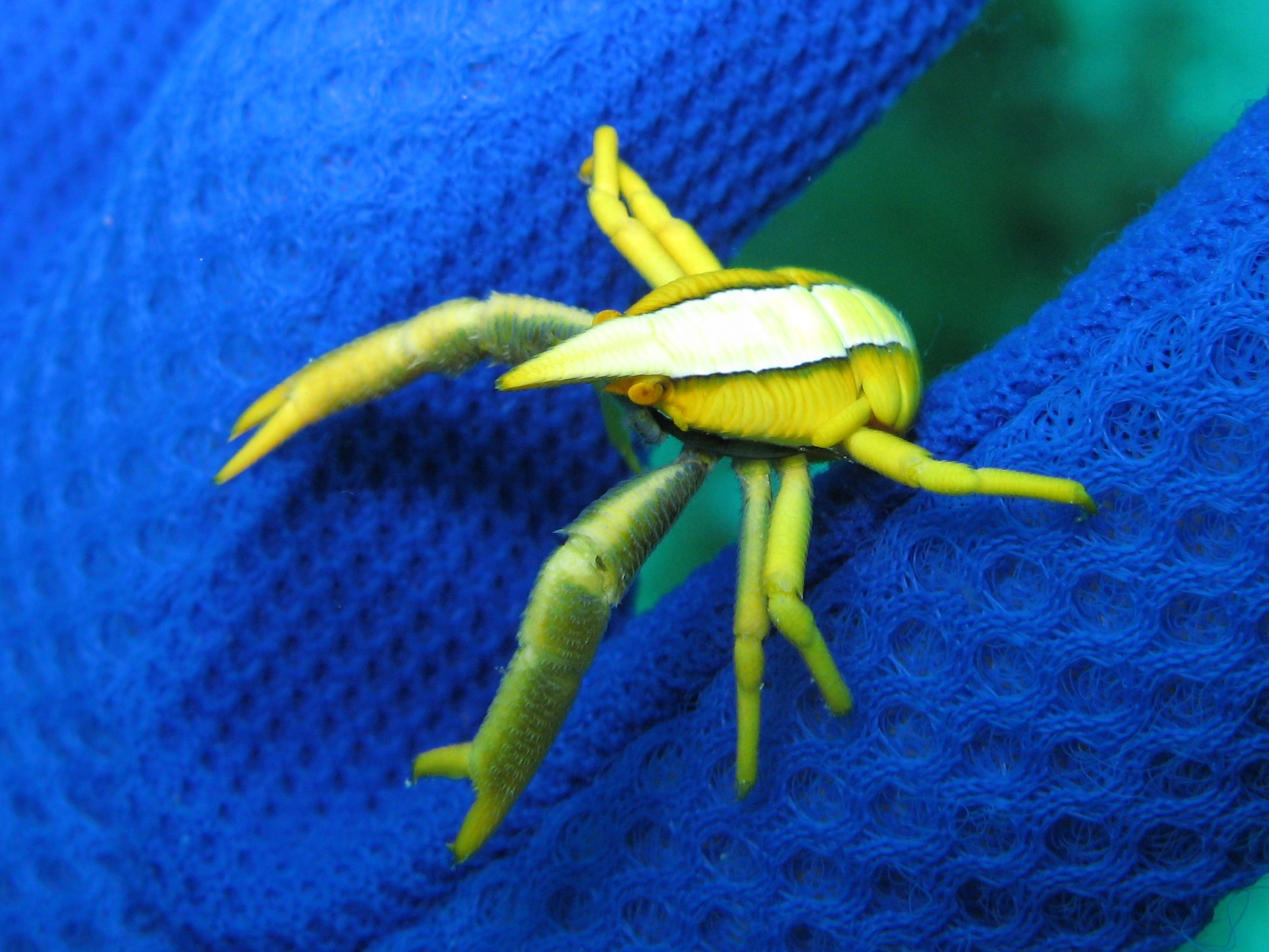

Scientific classification
- Kingdom: Animalia
- Phylum: Arthropoda
- Class: Malacostraca
- Order: Decapoda
- Suborder: Pleocyemata
- Infraorder: Anomura
- Family: Galatheidae
- Genus: Allogalathea
- Species: A. elegans

Binomial name
- Allogalathea elegans (Adams & White, 1848)

Synonyms
- Galathea deflexifrons Haswell, 1882; Galathea elegans Adams & White, 1848; Galathea grandirostris Stimpson, 1858; Galathea longirostris Dana, 1852; Galathea longirostris Yokoya, 1936

= Allogalathea elegans =

Species of crustacean

Allogalathea elegans (known as the feather star squat lobster, crinoid squat lobster or elegant squat lobster) is a species of squat lobster; they are more closely related to hermit crabs than true lobsters. They are sometimes kept in marine aquariums.

== Description ==
Allogalathea elegans is bilaterally symmetrical, like other squat lobsters. Its cephalothorax is teardrop-shaped. The extremity of the body corresponds to the triangular rostrum of the animal, which are positioned on each side of the stalked eyes. The rostrum is elongated and dorsally flattened and length varies. They have between five and nine lateral teeth. The chelipeds (first pair of legs) are endowed with pincers and are longer than the animal body. The last pair of legs are wasted. The body and mainly the legs are covered with small hairs. The animal's size depends on the sex. Females are usually bigger than males but never grow over 2 centimetres (0.79 in).

The animal's coloration is variable and is matching the colours of its host but not systematically. It can be uniform and varied from dark red, blackish-purple, orange or brown. But generally, the observed animals have longitudinal stripes which the thickness, the number and the tint varies.

== Geographic range ==
Allogalathea elegans lives in the tropical waters of the Indo-Pacific area, Red Sea included. They can be found from the eastern coast of Africa to the Fiji Islands and from Japan to Southern Australia. They have also recently been found in Korean waters.

Allogalathea elegans is a commensal of crinoids, living on the feather stars' bodies. They get protection and an ideal support for its feeding; they survive for some time away from a host, but its life expectancy will be shorter because it will not be shielded from predators. They are generally found in shallow waters at depths between 0–146 metres (0–479 ft).

== Biology ==
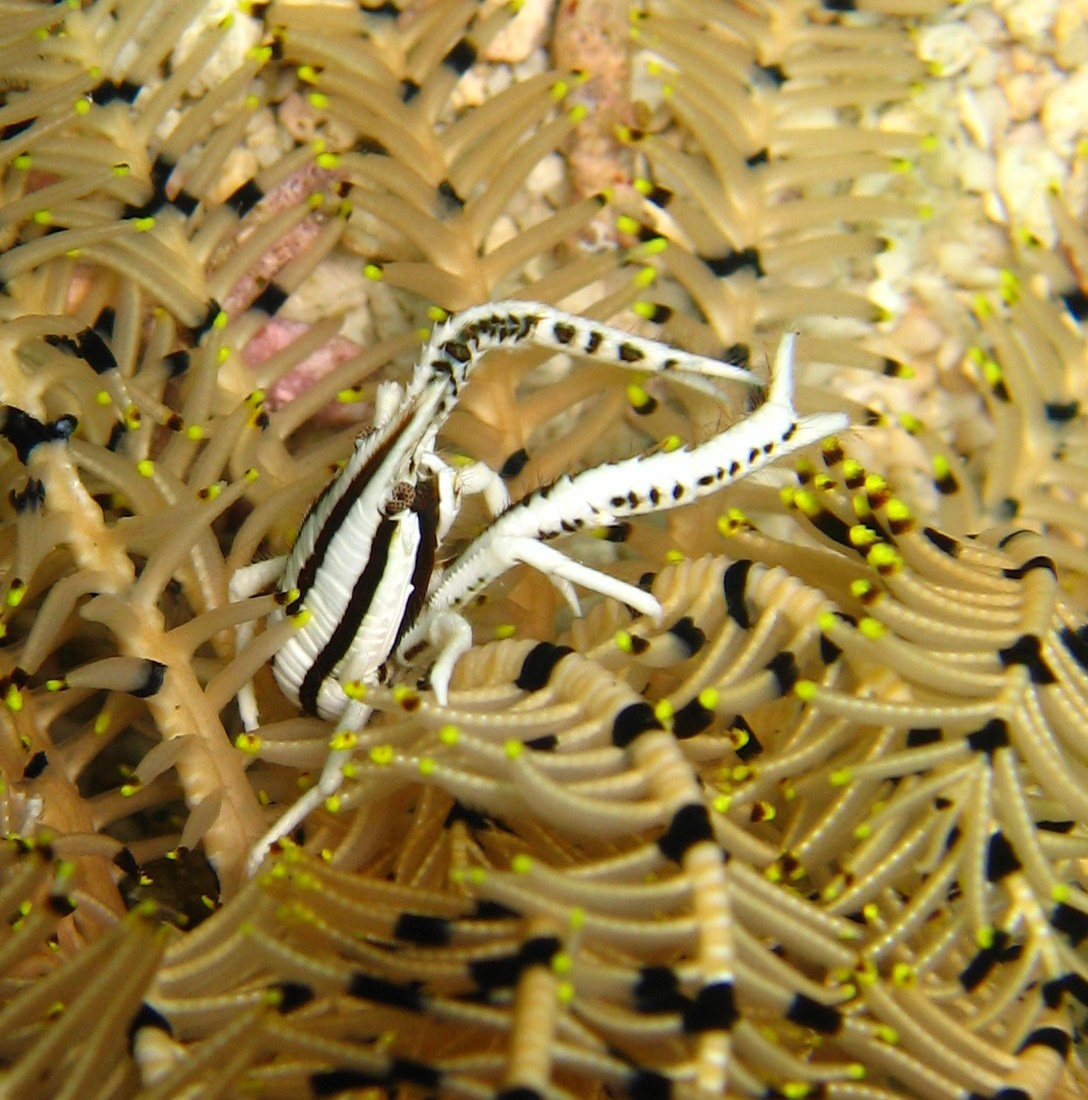
Black and white colour morph on a comatulid feather star

Allogalathea elegans may be found living alone or in large aggregations together. Many A. elegans have a symbiotic relationship with crinoids, most often feather stars. These crinoids help protect them from their biggest predator, fish. A. elegans are often found living close to or on top of crinoids.

Allogalathea elegans are planktotrophic feeders. They take advantage of their crinoid host who has the same diet and who always positions in the best catchment areas for the plankton to feed.

=== Life cycle ===
When the need and opportunity to mate comes around, Allogalathea elegans participate in precopulatory rituals involving various sensory cues. Female Allogalathea elegans are multiple spawners that lay eggs that hatch into larvae. Most females produced three or four broods during the annual reproductive period. Reproductive females exhibit group-synchronous gonadal development as well as breeding synchrony.

Allogalathea elegans goes through four zoeal stages before reaching the megalopal stage and then into the juvenile and adult stages. The duration of the four zoeal stages ranges from 13 to 16 days altogether. Beginning at the megalopal stage, Allogalathea elegans look like smaller versions of the adult stage until they reach their adult stage.

== In aquaria ==
In an aquarium, A. elegans requires a water temperature of 77–79 °F (25–26 °C), a pH of 8.1–8.3 and a salinity of 1.020–1.024. Small crevices in rocks act as hiding places for this shy crustacean. A. elegans prefers thawed food but will also eat small freeze-dried items.
