= Acanthogalathea parva =

Acanthogalathea parva Temporal range: Eocene–Oligocene

Scientific classification
- Domain: Eukaryota
- Kingdom: Animalia
- Phylum: Arthropoda
- Class: Malacostraca
- Order: Decapoda
- Suborder: Pleocyemata
- Infraorder: Anomura
- Family: Galatheidae
- Genus: Acanthogalathea
- Species: A. parva

Binomial name
- Acanthogalathea parva Müller & Collins, 1991

Extinct species of crustacean

Acanthogalathea parva is an extinct species of squat lobster in the family Galatheidae. It was extant during the Eocene and Oligocene.
