= Phylladiorhynchus ikedai =

Scientific classification
- Kingdom: Animalia
- Phylum: Arthropoda
- Clade: Pancrustacea
- Class: Malacostraca
- Order: Decapoda
- Suborder: Pleocyemata
- Infraorder: Anomura
- Family: Galatheidae
- Genus: Phylladiorhynchus
- Species: P. ikedai

Binomial name
- Phylladiorhynchus ikedai (Miyake & Baba, 1965)

Species of crustacean

Phylladiorhynchus ikedai is a species of squat lobster in the family Galatheidae. It is found in the Indo-Pacific, from the Red Sea, Maldives, Kei Islands, New Caledonia, Loyalty Islands, and Bonin Islands, at depths from sea level to 510 metres (1,670 ft).
