= Phylladiorhynchus bengalensis =

Scientific classification
- Domain: Eukaryota
- Kingdom: Animalia
- Phylum: Arthropoda
- Class: Malacostraca
- Order: Decapoda
- Suborder: Pleocyemata
- Infraorder: Anomura
- Family: Galatheidae
- Genus: Phylladiorhynchus
- Species: P. bengalensis

Binomial name
- Phylladiorhynchus bengalensis Tirmizi & Javed, 1980

Species of crustacean

Phylladiorhynchus bengalensis is a species of squat lobster in the family Galatheidae. It is found in the Andaman Sea.
