= Acanthogalathea squamosa =

Acanthogalathea squamosa Temporal range: Eocene

Scientific classification
- Domain: Eukaryota
- Kingdom: Animalia
- Phylum: Arthropoda
- Class: Malacostraca
- Order: Decapoda
- Suborder: Pleocyemata
- Infraorder: Anomura
- Family: Galatheidae
- Genus: Acanthogalathea
- Species: A. squamosa

Binomial name
- Acanthogalathea squamosa Beschin et al., 2007

Extinct species of crustacean

Acanthogalathea squamosa is an extinct species of squat lobster in the family Galatheidae. It was extant during the Eocene.
