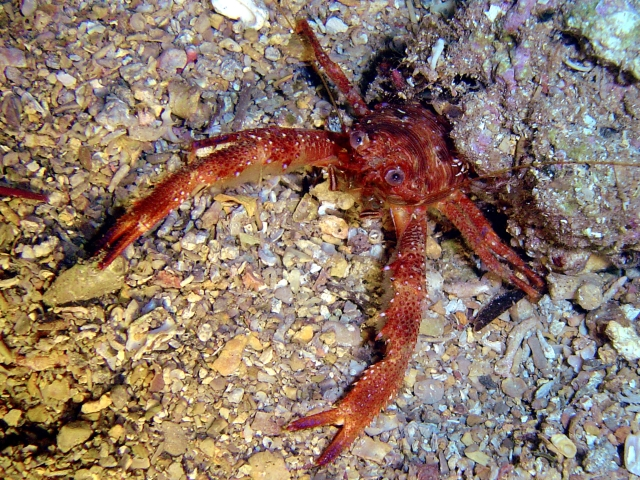

Scientific classification
- Kingdom: Animalia
- Phylum: Arthropoda
- Class: Malacostraca
- Order: Decapoda
- Suborder: Pleocyemata
- Infraorder: Anomura
- Family: Galatheidae
- Genus: Galathea
- Species: G. intermedia

Binomial name
- Galathea intermedia Lilljeborg, 1851

Synonyms
- Galathea giardi Barrois, 1882; Galathea andrewsii Kinahan, 1862; Galathea parroceli Gourret, 1887; Galathea pygmaea A. Milne Edwards & Bouvier, 1894

= Galathea intermedia =

Species of crustacean

Galathea intermedia is a species of squat lobster in the family Galatheidae.

== Description ==
G. intermedia is the smallest species of squat lobster in the North Sea, at a length of only 18 millimetres (0.71 in), and a carapace length of 8.5 mm (0.33 in). Normally, it has a reddish brown color with a beige stripe along the back, onto the narrow rostrum, but can also be yellowish or pink. The limbs are semitransparent, and the animal can sometimes have several "neon blue" spots on the front of the body that may serve in species recognition.

The animal's body is elongated and slightly flattened. The carapace has many ciliated transverse striae and bears distinct spines along the anterior and lateral margins. The rostrum presents sexual dimorfism, being longer and narrower in males and shorter in females.

The chelae (claws) are long and slender with spines and fine hairs, and can present sexual dimorfism. Females (and young males) have slender chelae, whereas males have larger chelae which can measure about twice the length of the carapace.

== Distribution and ecology ==
It is found in the north-eastern Atlantic Ocean, as far north as Troms, Norway, and the North sea. It has been also recorded in the Bay of Biscay and the Atlantic coasts of Spain, Portugal and Morocco. Its south limit is South Africa. It is also present in the Mediterranean Sea, but it is possible that these records belong to a different sub-species.

This species most commonly occurs in depths between 8 and 100 meters, usually in the subtidal. It inhabits a wide range of substrata, including hard mud, sand, gravel, maerl or stones. They can also be found among macroalgae.

They are nocturnal and during the day they have a somewhat cryptic behavior taking refuge under stones, among empty shells and under hard substrate structures. They are usually found in small groups inside these refuges. Their small size makes them easily mistaken for juveniles of other species within the same genus.
