= Acanthogalathea feldmanni =

Acanthogalathea feldmanni Temporal range: Eocene–Oligocene

Scientific classification
- Domain: Eukaryota
- Kingdom: Animalia
- Phylum: Arthropoda
- Class: Malacostraca
- Order: Decapoda
- Suborder: Pleocyemata
- Infraorder: Anomura
- Family: Galatheidae
- Genus: Acanthogalathea
- Species: A. feldmanni

Binomial name
- Acanthogalathea feldmanni De Angeli and Garassino, 2002

Extinct species of crustacean

Acanthogalathea feldmanni is an extinct species of squat lobster in the family Galatheidae. It was extant during the Eocene and Oligocene.
