= Nanogalathea =

Scientific classification
- Kingdom: Animalia
- Phylum: Arthropoda
- Clade: Pancrustacea
- Class: Malacostraca
- Order: Decapoda
- Suborder: Pleocyemata
- Infraorder: Anomura
- Family: Galatheidae
- Genus: Nanogalathea; Tirmizi & Javed, 1980

Genus of crustaceans

Nanogalathea is a genus of squat lobster from the Bay of Bengal. There are two species in the genus Nanogalathea.

== Species ==
- Nanogalathea longispina Tiwari, Padate, Cubelio & Osawa, 2024
- Nanogalathea raymondi Tirmizi & Javed, 1980
