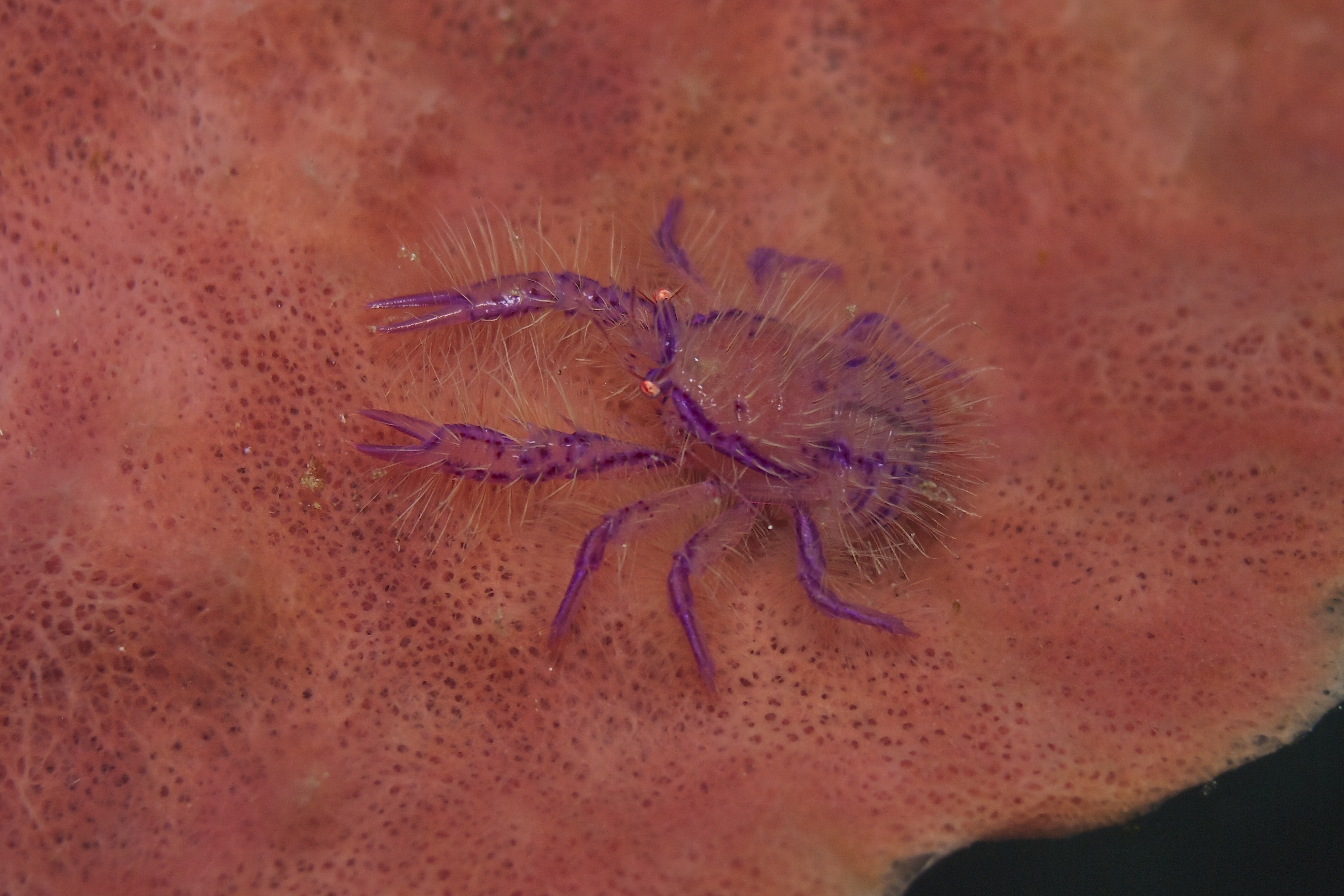
- Lauriea siagiani in a giant barrel sponge

Scientific classification
- Kingdom: Animalia
- Phylum: Arthropoda
- Clade: Pancrustacea
- Class: Malacostraca
- Order: Decapoda
- Suborder: Pleocyemata
- Infraorder: Anomura
- Family: Galatheidae
- Genus: Lauriea; Baba, 1971

= Lauriea =

Genus of crustaceans

Lauriea is a genus of squat lobsters in the family Galatheidae, containing the following species:

- Lauriea gardineri (Laurie, 1926)
- Lauriea siagiani Baba, 1994

The genus was named in 1971 by Keiji Baba in honour of R. D. Laurie, who discovered the first species.
