= Fennerogalathea =

Scientific classification
- Kingdom: Animalia
- Phylum: Arthropoda
- Clade: Pancrustacea
- Class: Malacostraca
- Order: Decapoda
- Suborder: Pleocyemata
- Infraorder: Anomura
- Family: Galatheidae
- Genus: Fennerogalathea; Baba, 1988

Genus of crustaceans

Fennerogalathea is a genus of squat lobsters in the family Galatheidae, containing the following species:

- Fennerogalathea chacei Baba, 1988
- Fennerogalathea chirostyloides Tirmizi & Javed, 1993
