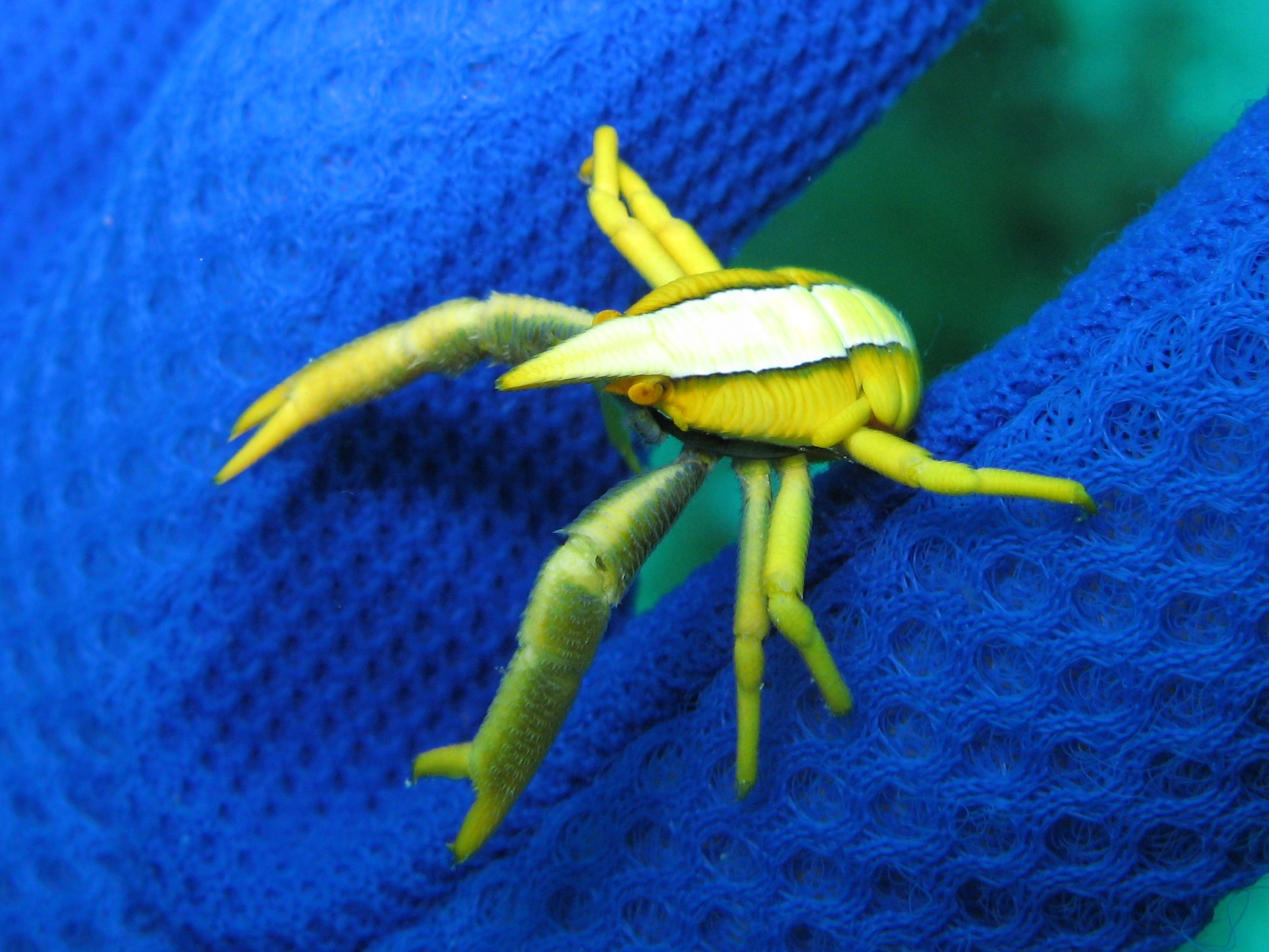
- Allogalathea elegans

Scientific classification
- Kingdom: Animalia
- Phylum: Arthropoda
- Clade: Pancrustacea
- Class: Malacostraca
- Order: Decapoda
- Suborder: Pleocyemata
- Infraorder: Anomura
- Family: Galatheidae
- Genus: Allogalathea; Baba, 1969

= Allogalathea =

Genus of crustaceans

Allogalathea is a genus of squat lobsters, containing the following species:

- Allogalathea babai Cabezas, Macpherson & Machordom, 2011
- Allogalathea elegans (Adams & White, 1848)
- Allogalathea inermis Cabezas, Macpherson & Machordom, 2011
- Allogalathea longimana Cabezas, Macpherson & Machordom, 2011

== Bibliography ==
- Cabezas, P.; Macpherson, E.; Machordom, A. (2011). Allogalathea (Decapoda: Galatheidae): a monospecific genus of squat lobster? Zoological Journal of the Linnean Society, 162(2): 245–270.
