= Acanthogalathea =

Acanthogalathea Temporal range: Eocene–Oligocene

Scientific classification
- Domain: Eukaryota
- Kingdom: Animalia
- Phylum: Arthropoda
- Class: Malacostraca
- Order: Decapoda
- Suborder: Pleocyemata
- Infraorder: Anomura
- Family: Galatheidae
- Genus: Acanthogalathea; Müller & Collins, 1991

Extinct genus of crustaceans

Acanthogalathea is an extinct genus of squat lobsters in the family Galatheidae. It was extant during the Eocene and Oligocene. It contains six species:

- Acanthogalathea broglioi Beschin et al., 2016
- Acanthogalathea devecchii Beschin et al., 2016
- Acanthogalathea feldmanni De Angeli and Garassino, 2002
- Acanthogalathea parva Müller & Collins, 1991
- Acanthogalathea paucispinosa Beschin et al., 2016
- Acanthogalathea squamosa Beschin et al., 2007
