= Allomunida =

Scientific classification
- Kingdom: Animalia
- Phylum: Arthropoda
- Clade: Pancrustacea
- Class: Malacostraca
- Order: Decapoda
- Suborder: Pleocyemata
- Infraorder: Anomura
- Family: Galatheidae
- Genus: Allomunida
- Species: A. magnicheles

Binomial name
- Allomunida magnicheles Baba, 1988

Genus of crustaceans

Allomunida magnicheles is a species of squat lobster in a monotypic genus in the family Galatheidae.
