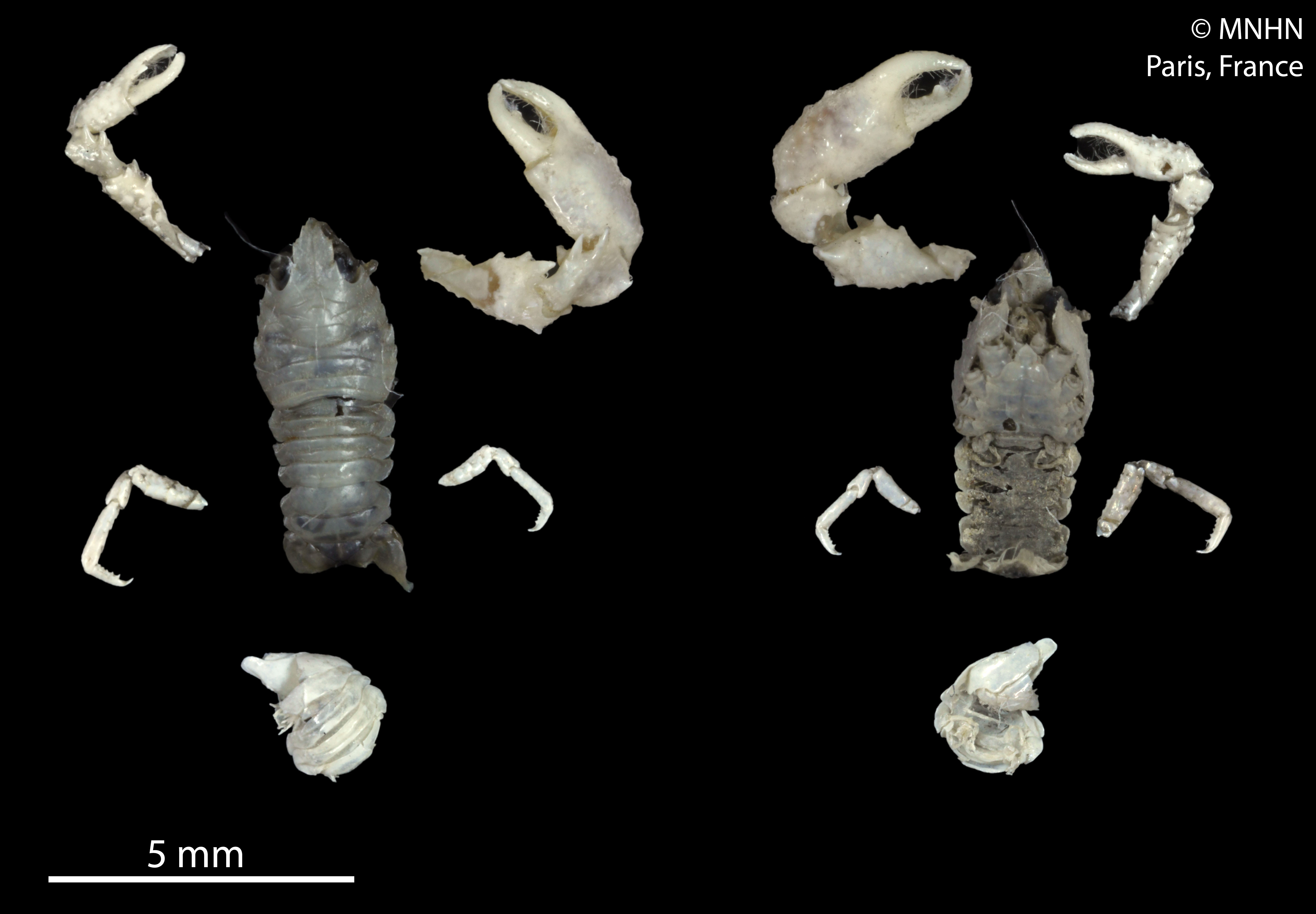
- Coralliogalathea megalochira (syntype at MNHN, Paris)

Scientific classification
- Kingdom: Animalia
- Phylum: Arthropoda
- Clade: Pancrustacea
- Class: Malacostraca
- Order: Decapoda
- Suborder: Pleocyemata
- Infraorder: Anomura
- Family: Galatheidae
- Genus: Coralliogalathea; Baba & Javed, 1974

= Coralliogalathea =

Genus of crustaceans

Coralliogalathea is a genus of squat lobsters in the family Galatheidae. Initially thought to be monotypic, solely represented by Coralliogalathea humilis, recent analysis has split the genus into six, morphologically similar but genetically different species.

== Species ==
- Coralliogalathea humilis Nobili, 1905
- Coralliogalathea joae Rodríguez-Flores, et al., 2018
- Coralliogalathea megalochira Nobili, 1906
- Coralliogalathea minuta Rodríguez-Flores, et al., 2018
- Coralliogalathea parva Rodríguez-Flores, et al., 2018
- Coralliogalathea tridentirostris Miyake, 1953
