= Janetogalathea =

Scientific classification
- Kingdom: Animalia
- Phylum: Arthropoda
- Clade: Pancrustacea
- Class: Malacostraca
- Order: Decapoda
- Suborder: Pleocyemata
- Infraorder: Anomura
- Family: Galatheidae
- Genus: Janetogalathea; Baba & Wicksten, 1997
- Species: J. californiensis

Binomial name
- Janetogalathea californiensis (Benedict, 1902)

Genus of crustaceans

Janetogalathea californiensis is a species of squat lobster in the monotypic genus Janetogalathea in the family Galatheidae.
