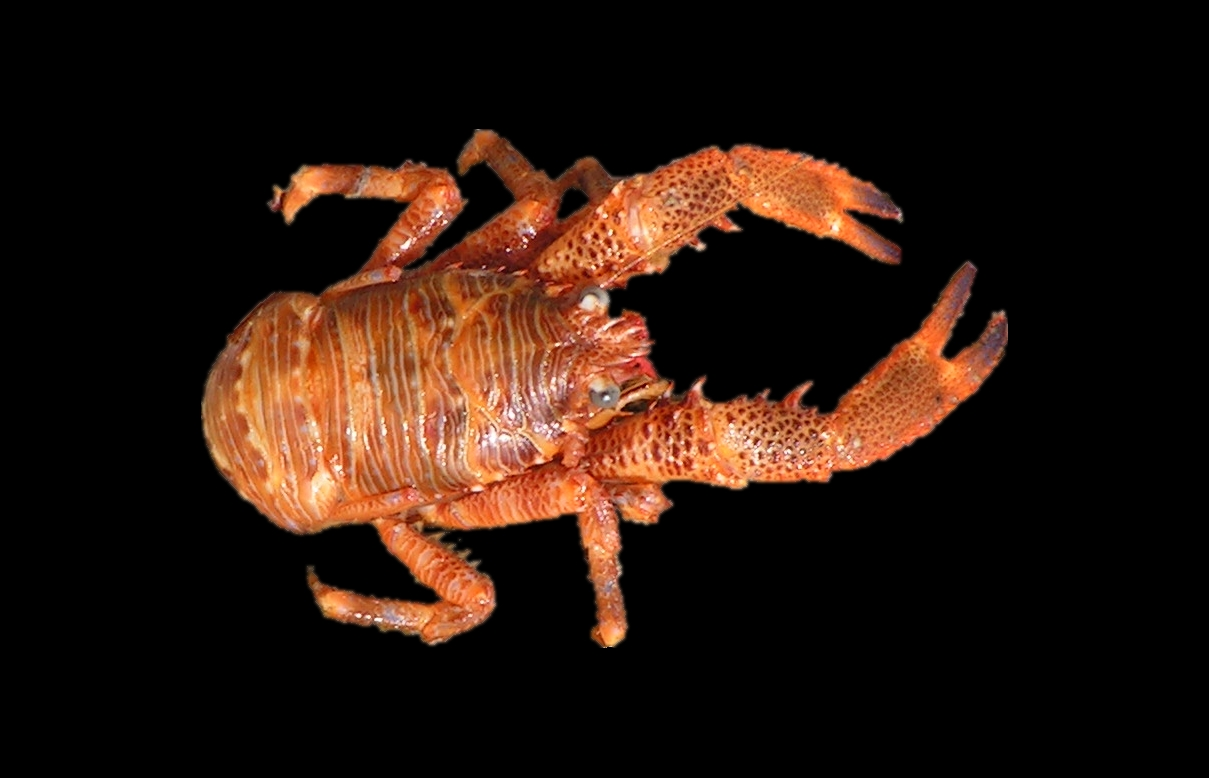
- Galathea squamifera

Scientific classification
- Kingdom: Animalia
- Phylum: Arthropoda
- Class: Malacostraca
- Order: Decapoda
- Suborder: Pleocyemata
- Infraorder: Anomura
- Family: Galatheidae
- Genus: Galathea; Fabricius, 1793

Type species
- Cancer strigosus Linnaeus, 1761

Species
- See text

= Galathea =

Genus of crustaceans

Galathea is a genus of squat lobsters in the family Galatheidae. It is one of the largest genera of squat lobsters that in 2008 contained 73 species (17 in the Atlantic Ocean, 25 in the Indian Ocean and 43 in the Pacific Ocean) (several more have been described more recently). Most species of Galathea live in shallow waters.

== Species ==
As of 2025, Galathea contains the following species:

- Galathea acerata Macpherson & Robainas-Barcia, 2015
- Galathea acis Macpherson & Robainas-Barcia, 2015
- Galathea aegyptiaca Paul'son, 1875
- Galathea aequata Macpherson & Robainas-Barcia, 2015
- Galathea albatrossae Baba, 1988
- Galathea amamiensis Miyake & Baba, 1966
- Galathea amboinensis De Man, 1888
- Galathea anepipoda Baba, 1990
- Galathea australiensis Stimpson, 1858
- Galathea balssi Miyake & Baba, 1964
- Galathea bengala Tirmizi & Javed, 1993
- Galathea bidens Baba, 1988
- Galathea bimaculata Miyake & Baba, 1966
- Galathea bolivari Zariquiey Álvarez, 1950
- Galathea boninensis Miyake & Baba, 1965
- Galathea brevimana Paul'son, 1875
- Galathea capillata Miyake & Baba, 1970
- Galathea cenarroi Zariquiey Álvarez, 1968
- Galathea consobrina De Man, 1902
- Galathea corallicola Haswell, 1882
- Galathea coralliophilus Baba & Oh, 1990
- Galathea cymbulaerostris Tirmizi, 1966
- Galathea dispersa Bate, 1859
- Galathea faiali Nunes-Ruivo, 1961
- Galathea formosa De Man, 1902
- Galathea genkai Miyake & Baba, 1964
- Galathea guttata Osawa, 2004
- Galathea hispida Baba, 2005
- Galathea inconspicua Henderson, 1885
- Galathea inflata Potts, 1915
- Galathea intermedia Liljeborg, 1851
- Galathea keijii Tirzimi & Javed, 1993
- Galathea kuboi Miyake & Baba, 1967
- Galathea labidolepta Stimpson, 1858
- Galathea latirostris Dana, 1852
- Galathea lenis Baba, 1969
- Galathea longimana Paul'son, 1875
- Galathea longimanoides Johnson, 1970
- Galathea lumaria Baba, 2005
- Galathea machadoi Barrois, 1888
- Galathea maculiabdominalis Baba, 1972
- Galathea magnifica Haswell, 1882
- Galathea mauritiana Bouvier, 1914
- Galathea multilineata Balss, 1913
- Galathea nexa Embleton, 1834
- Galathea ohshimai Miyake & Baba, 1967
- Galathea omanensis Tirmizi & Javed, 1993
- Galathea orientalis Stimpson, 1858
- Galathea patae Osawa, 2006
- Galathea paucilineata Benedict, 1902
- Galathea pilosa De Man, 1888
- Galathea platycheles Miyake, 1953
- Galathea pubescens Stimpson, 1858
- Galathea quinquespinosa (Balss, 1913)
- Galathea robusta Baba, 1990
- Galathea rostrata A. Milne Edwards 1880
- Galathea rubromaculata Miyake & Baba, 1967
- Galathea rufipes A. Milne Edwards & Bouvier, 1894
- Galathea spinimanus Borradaile, 1900
- Galathea spinosorostris Dana, 1852
- Galathea squamea Baba, 1979
- Galathea squamifera Leach, 1814
- Galathea strigosa (Linnaeus, 1761)
- Galathea submagnifica Laurie, 1926
- Galathea subsquamata Stimpson, 1858
- Galathea tanegashimae Baba, 1969
- Galathea ternatensis De Man, 1902
- Galathea tropis Baba, 2005
- Galathea tukitukimea Salamanca, Asorey & Macpherson, 2025
- Galathea venusta Miyake & Baba, 1970
- Galathea vitiensis Dana, 1852
- Galathea waiora Macpherson & Robainas-Barcia, 2015
- Galathea whiteleggii Grant & McCulloch, 1906
- Galathea wolffi Miyake & Baba, 1970
- Galathea yamashitai Miyake & Baba, 1967
- Galathea bharata Tiwari, Padate, Cubelio & Osawa, 2024
- Galathea kalingasagara Tiwari, Padate, Cubelio & Osawa, 2024
- Galathea quadrangularis Tiwari, Padate, Cubelio & Osawa, 2024
- † Galathea? genesis Robins & Klompmaker, 2019
