= Phylladiorhynchus =

Scientific classification
- Domain: Eukaryota
- Kingdom: Animalia
- Phylum: Arthropoda
- Class: Malacostraca
- Order: Decapoda
- Suborder: Pleocyemata
- Infraorder: Anomura
- Family: Galatheidae
- Genus: Phylladiorhynchus; Baba, 1969

Genus of lobsters

Phylladiorhynchus is a genus of squat lobsters in the family Galatheidae, containing the following species:

- Phylladiorhynchus bengalensis Tirmizi & Javed, 1980
- Phylladiorhynchus ikedai (Miyake & Baba, 1965)
- Phylladiorhynchus integrirostris (Dana, 1852)
- Phylladiorhynchus nudus Macpherson, 2008
- Phylladiorhynchus pusillus (Henderson, 1885)
