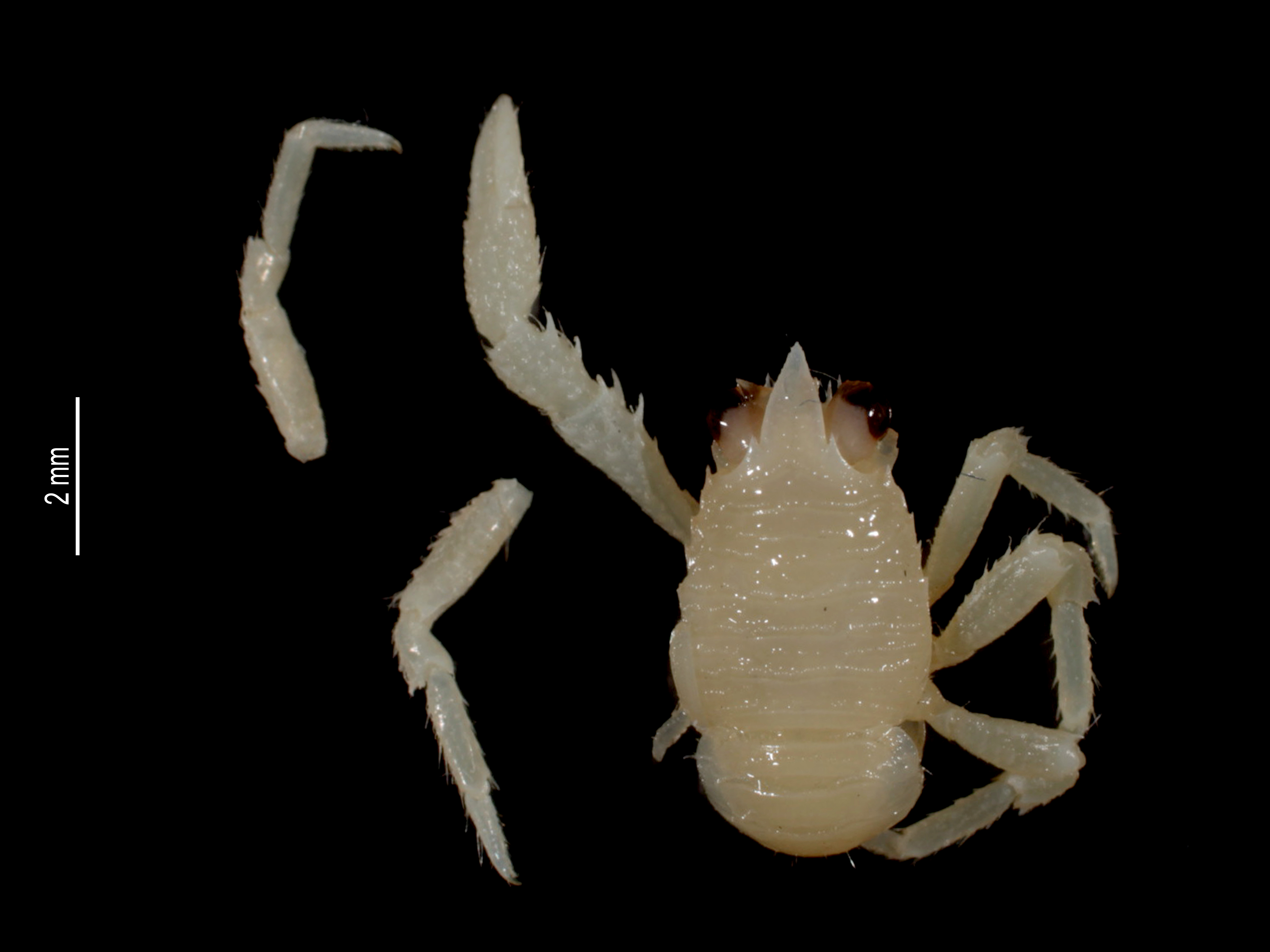

Scientific classification
- Kingdom: Animalia
- Phylum: Arthropoda
- Clade: Pancrustacea
- Class: Malacostraca
- Order: Decapoda
- Suborder: Pleocyemata
- Infraorder: Anomura
- Family: Galatheidae
- Genus: Alainius; Baba, 1991
- Species: A. crosnieri

Binomial name
- Alainius crosnieri Baba, 1991

= Alainius =

Genus of crustaceans

Alainius crosnieri is a species of squat lobster in the monotypic genus Alainius in the family Galatheidae.
