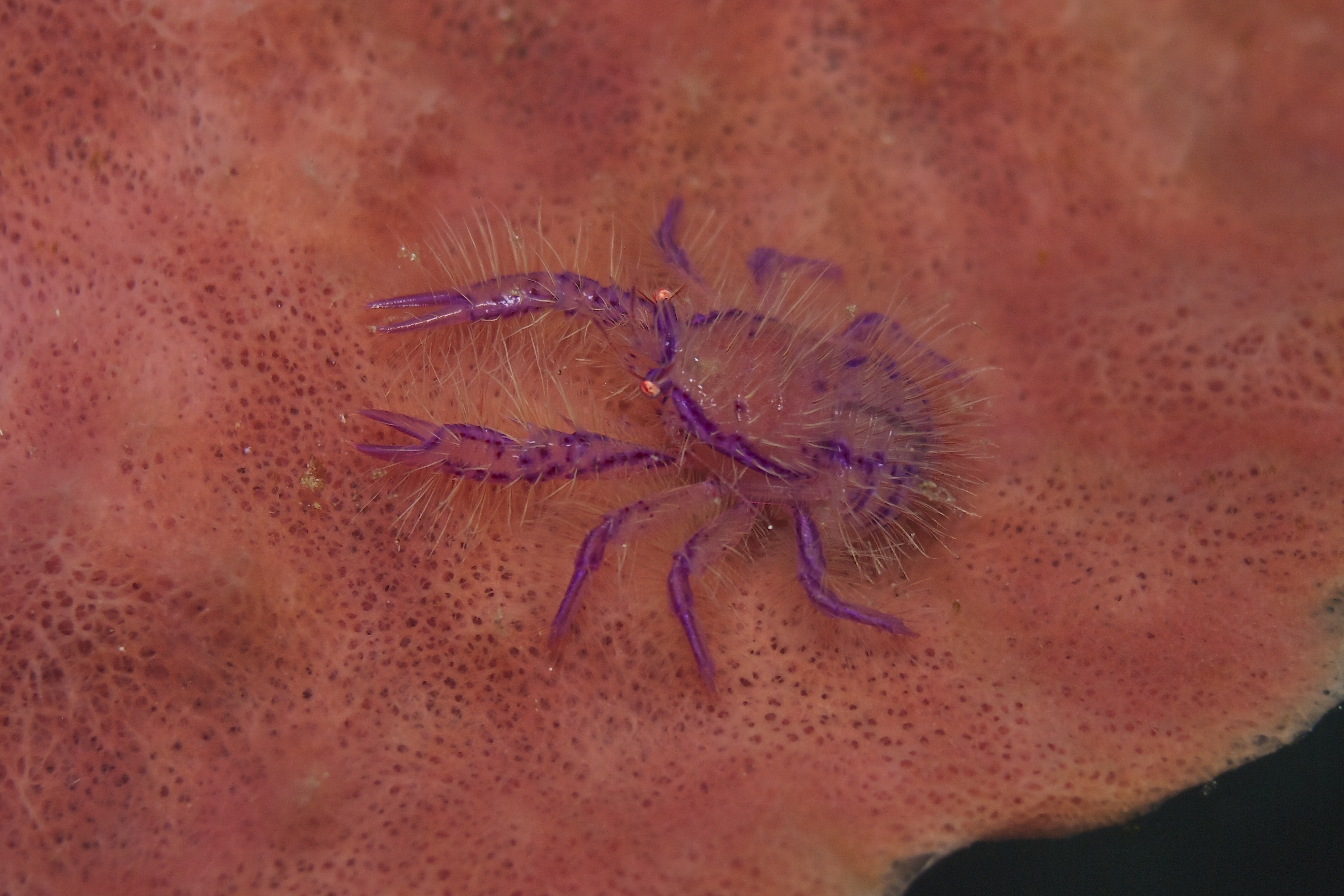
- Lauriea siagiani in a giant barrel sponge
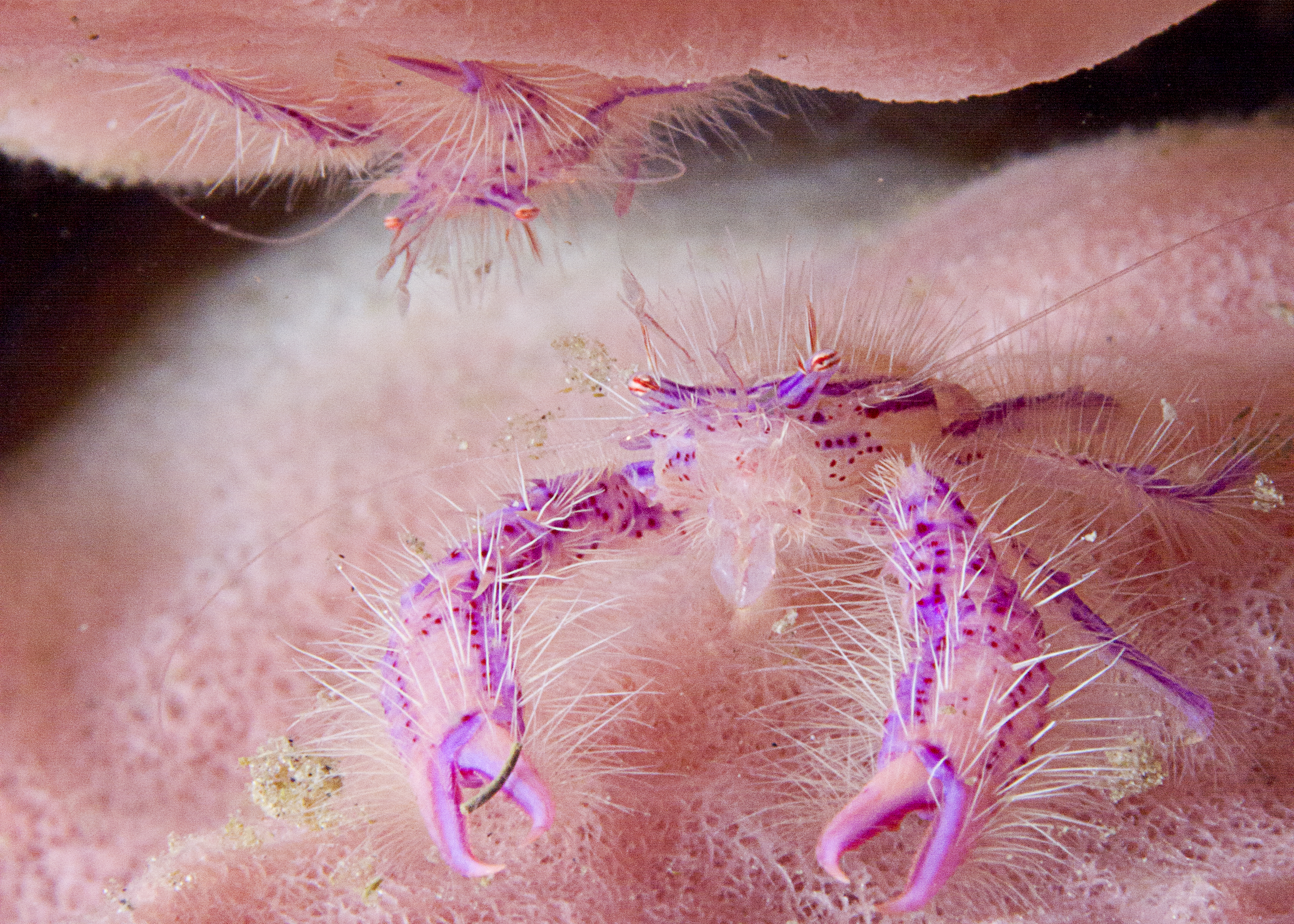

Scientific classification
- Kingdom: Animalia
- Phylum: Arthropoda
- Clade: Pancrustacea
- Class: Malacostraca
- Order: Decapoda
- Suborder: Pleocyemata
- Infraorder: Anomura
- Family: Galatheidae
- Genus: Lauriea
- Species: L. siagiani

Binomial name
- Lauriea siagiani Baba, 1994

= Lauriea siagiani =

Species of crustacean

Lauriea siagiani, also known as the pink hairy squat lobster or the fairy crab, is a species of squat lobster in the family Galatheidae, genus Lauriea.

== Description ==
Lauriea siagiani is a small squat lobster, up to 20 millimetres (0.79 in) long. It differs from the only other species in the genus, Lauriea gardineri by a number of features, but most obviously by the coloration: L. gardineri is pale brown with darker bands, while L. siagiani is orange or pink with red or purplish markings.

== Distribution and ecology ==
Lauriea siagiani is found around the giant sponge Xestospongia testudinaria, and has been recorded from Indonesia, the Philippines and Japan.

== Taxonomy ==
Lauriea siagiani was described in 1994 by Keiji Baba; the specific epithet commemorates Wilhelm Siagian, who collected the type material. The species had been previously illustrated by the photographer Roger Steene (as "Galathea sp."), from which Baba recognised that it must represent a new species.
