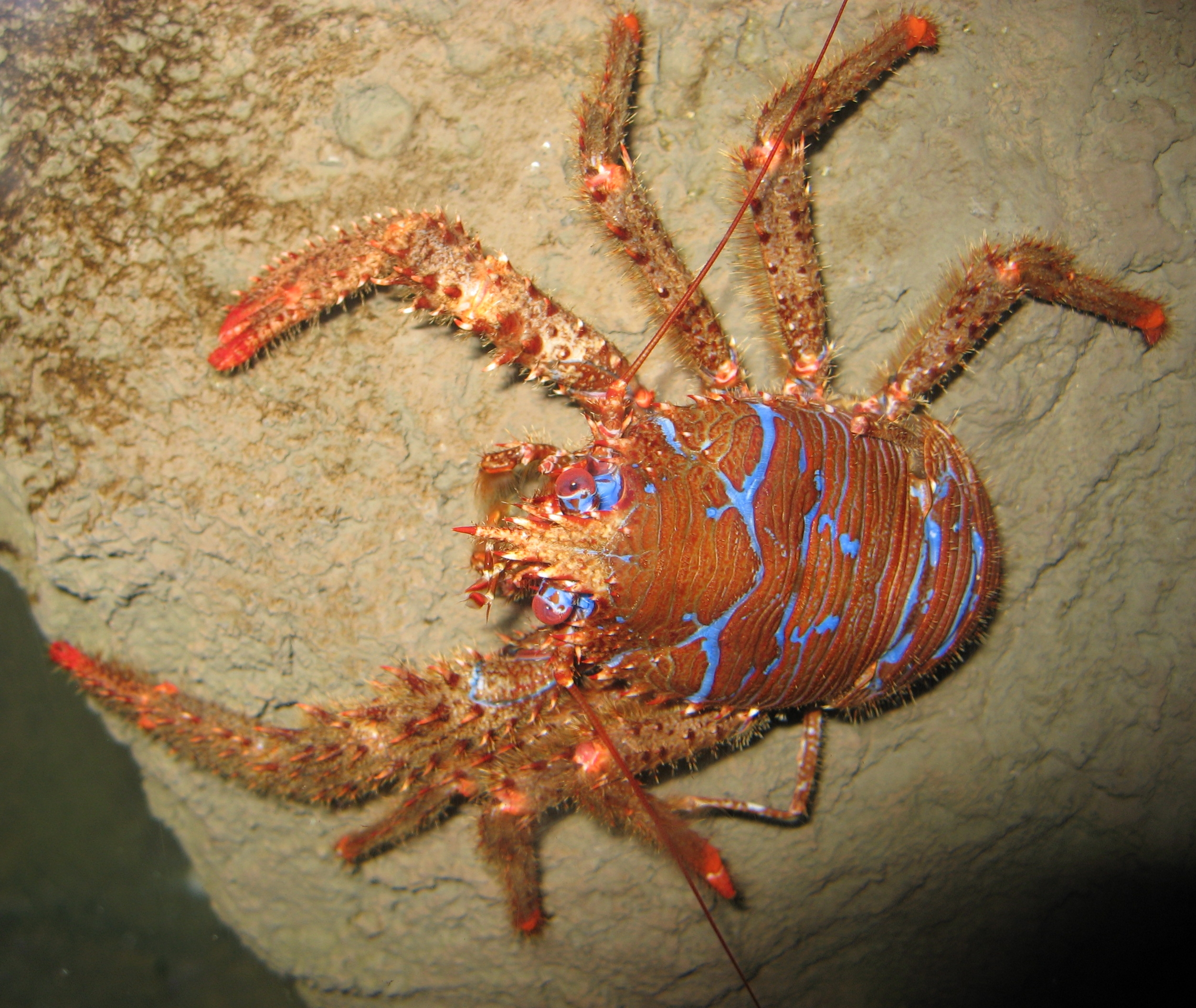

Scientific classification
- Kingdom: Animalia
- Phylum: Arthropoda
- Class: Malacostraca
- Order: Decapoda
- Suborder: Pleocyemata
- Infraorder: Anomura
- Family: Galatheidae
- Genus: Galathea
- Species: G. strigosa

Binomial name
- Galathea strigosa (Linnaeus, 1761)

Synonyms
- Cancer strigosus Linnaeus, 1761; Astacus strigosus Linnaeus, 1761; Calypso periculosa Risso, 1816; Janira periculosa Risso, 1816; Galathaea strigosa Linnaeus, 1761; Galathea spinigera Leach, 1815; Ogre Cancer Leach, 1815

= Galathea strigosa =

Species of squat lobster

Galathea strigosa is a species of squat lobster in the family Galatheidae. It is found in the northeast Atlantic Ocean, from the North Cape to the Canary Islands, and in the Mediterranean Sea and Red Sea. It is edible, but not fished commercially. It is the largest squat lobster in the northeast Atlantic, reaching a length of 90 millimetres (3.5 in), or a carapace length of 53 mm (2.1 in), and is easily identified by the transverse blue stripes across the body.
