= Motu Motiro Hiva Marine Park =

Marine park in Chile

- IUCN category II (national park)
- Interactive map of Motu Motiro Hiva Marine Park
- Location: Chile, Easter Island Province, Valparaíso Region
- Nearest city: Valparaíso
- Coordinates: 27°04′S 104°00′W
- Area: 150,000 km^{2} (58,000 sq mi)
- Established: 4 December 2010
- Governing body: Sernapesca

The Motu Motiro Hiva Marine Park, (also called informally Salas y Gómez Marine Park), is the largest marine park in Chile. It is around Salas y Gómez, in the far east of Polynesia. The park covers 150,000 km² of ocean. This is about 4% of the Chilean sea territory.

Because it is far from South America, the island and the sea around it have very little human impact. The ecosystem is almost untouched.

== History ==
In 2008, at the Deepsea Coral Symposium in Wellington, New Zealand, the idea to create a marine protected area around the Salas y Gómez and Nazca underwater ridges was presented for the first time.

In 2009, the World Wildlife Fund published a study in the Latin American Journal of Aquatic Research. It gave scientific reasons to create a marine protected area.

In March 2010, Oceana, National Geographic, Catholic University of the North, the Chilean Navy and other experts went on an expedition to Salas y Gómez Island. They studied the unique species and asked the government to create a marine park. In August 2010, a technical report explained the main features of the future park.

The decree creating the park was signed on 18 November 2010 by the Minister of Economy Juan Andrés Fontaine and the Minister of Environment María Ignacia Benítez. Pierre Yves, the son of ocean explorer Jacques Cousteau, was also present.

President Sebastián Piñera said the park was very important because it is a refuge for millions of seabirds and many fish and invertebrate species. Some of them exist only in this place.

However, Greenpeace criticized the creation. They called it a "paper park" because the decree did not forbid industrial fishing, including bottom trawling, which had damaged the area before.

== Management ==
The park is managed together by the Rapa Nui people and the Chilean state. The council has 11 members: 6 are Rapa Nui representatives chosen by election, and the other 5 come from different ministries of the Chilean government.

== Biodiversity ==
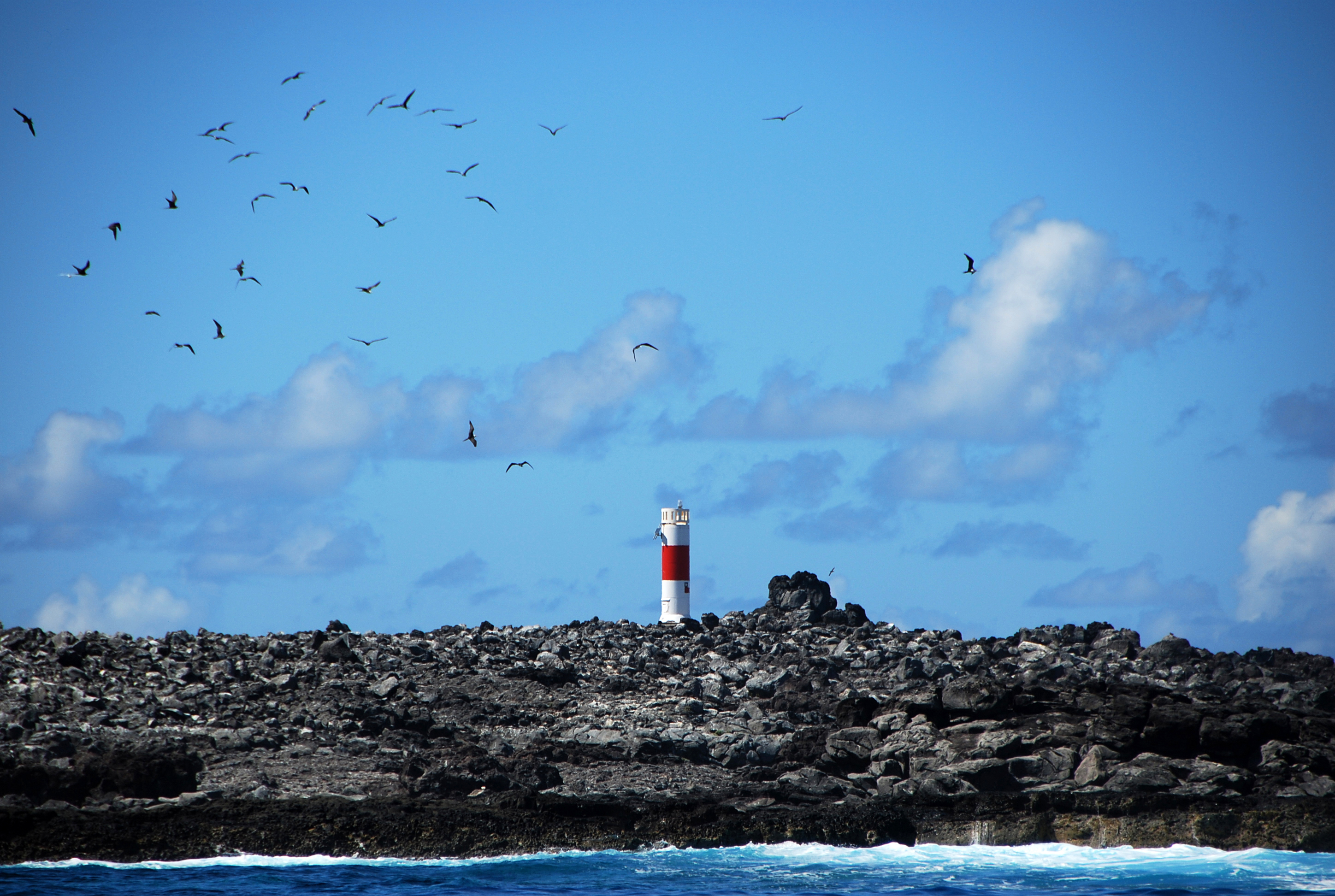
Seabirds flying near the island lighthouse

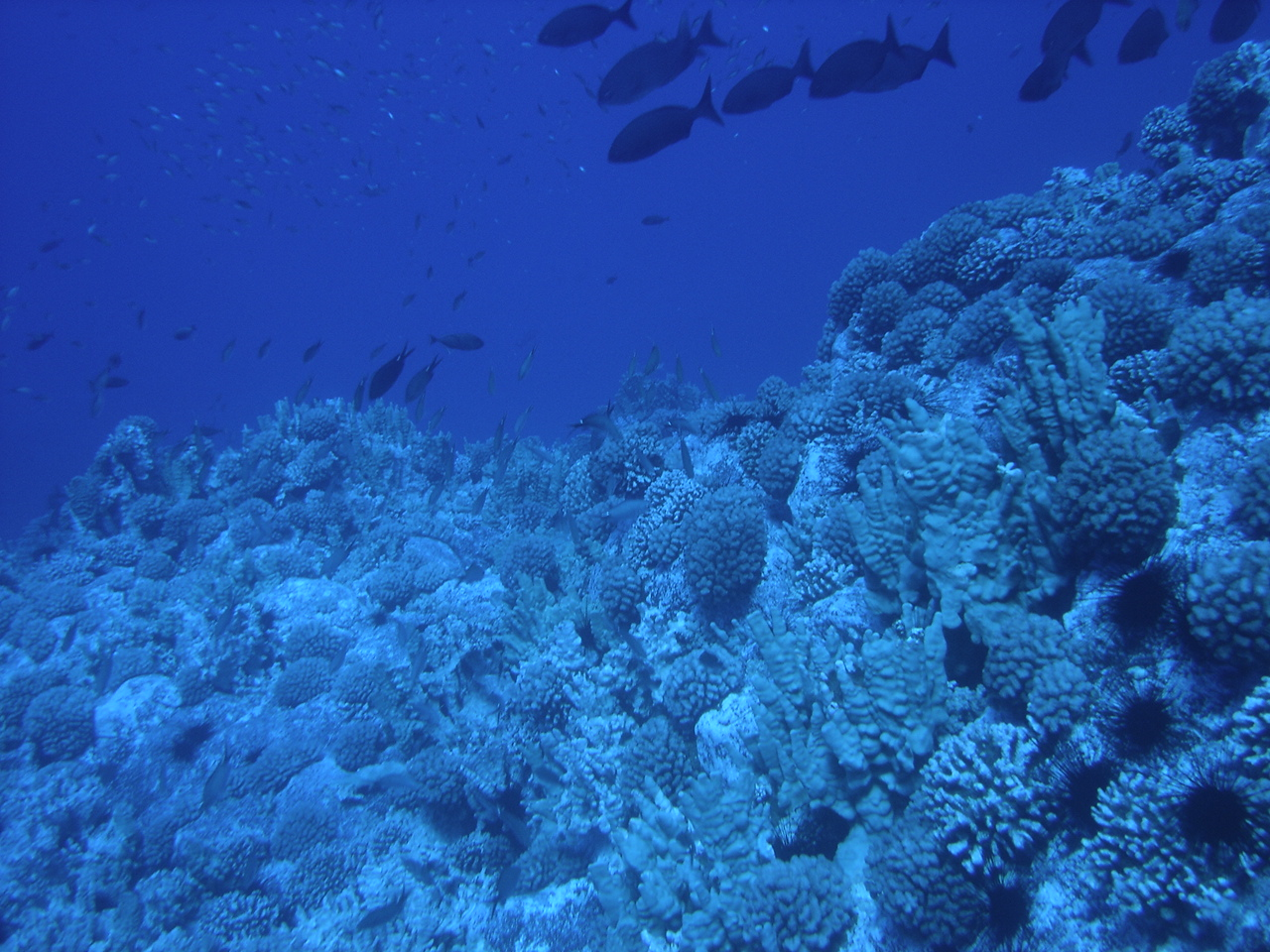
Corals and fish in the waters of the park

The waters around Salas y Gómez Island are one of the least disturbed marine places in the world. The island is important for seabirds and migratory birds that come to nest. Out of 93 seabird nesting sites in Chile, 12 are on this island. Species include the Christmas shearwater, the polynesian storm petrel, and the red-tailed tropicbird.

Some studies say the nearby Nazca Ridge may be a reproduction area for blue whales that feed in southern Chile during summer.

The Galápagos shark is very common in these waters. Local fishermen say they are found only here in great numbers. Other species include lantern sharks (Etmopterus), mollusks such as Nerita morio and Cypraea caputdraconis, and many invertebrates and fish living in the underwater mountains.
