= Paul Gourret =

French zoologist (1859–1903)

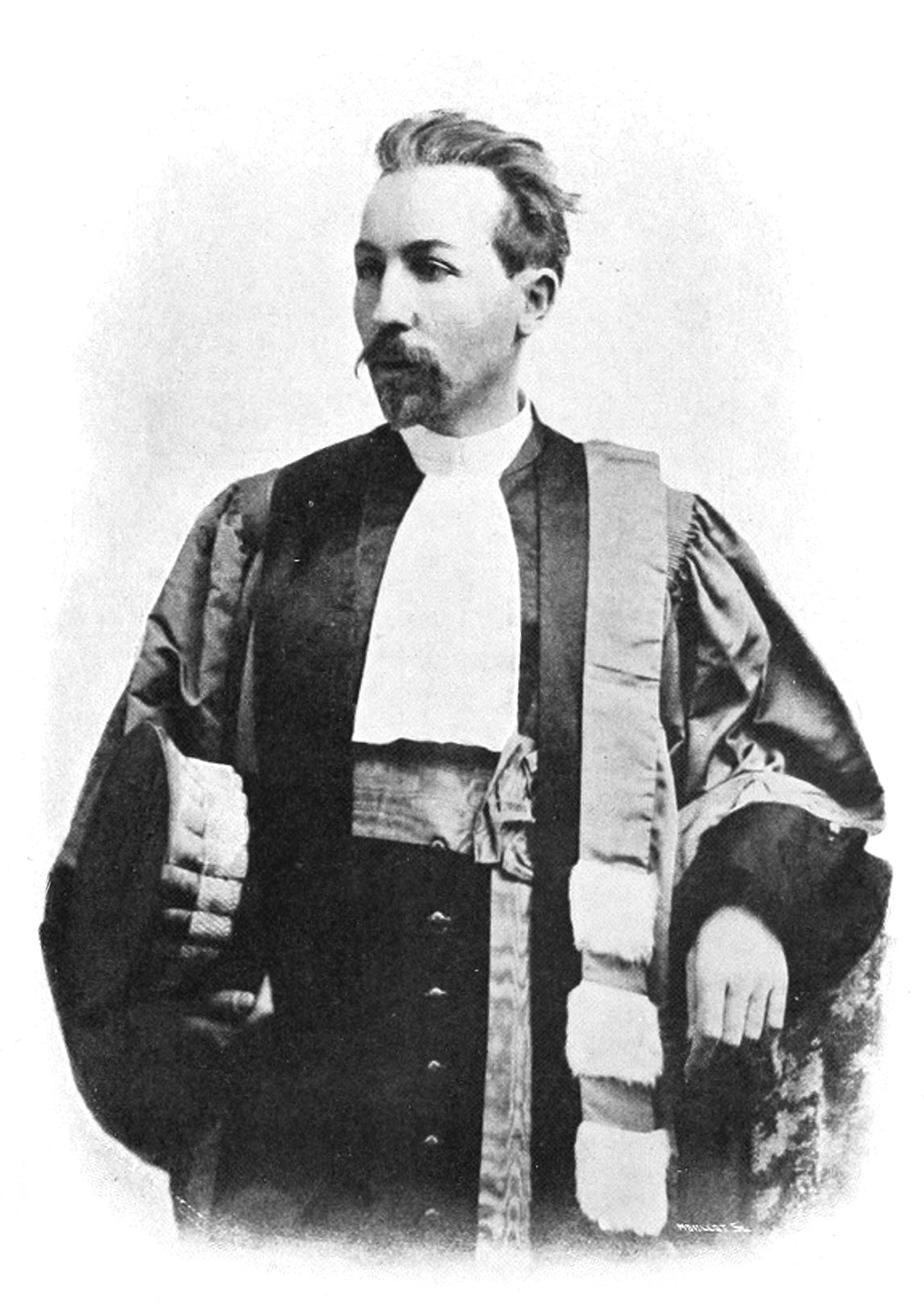
Paul Gourret

Paul Gabriel Marie Gourret (15 January 1859 in Roquevaire – 7 April 1903) was a French zoologist remembered for his biological studies of marine fauna and his work in the fishing industry. Gourret also worked with algae.

He studied natural sciences in Marseille, subsequently serving as a lecturer to the faculty of sciences in Lyon. In November 1886, he was named adjunct professor of zoology at the school of medicine in Marseille. From May 1893, he served as deputy director of the zoological station at Marseille.

He was a member of the advisory committee on Marine Fisheries in the Ministry of Marine, and in 1902 he became a chevalier of the Legion d'honneur.

The genus Gourretia from the family Callianassidae is named in his honor.

He is the great-grandfather of French writer Philippe Guénin.

== Selected publications ==
- Révision des crustacés podophthalmes de golfe de Marseille suivie d'un essai de classification de la classe des crustacés, 1888 - Review of podophthalmus crustaceans from the Gulf of Marseille.
- Sur les péridiniens du Golfe de Marseille, 1883 - On dinoflagellates found in the Gulf of Marseille.
- Considérations sur la faune pélagique du golfe de Marseille, 1884 - Considerations involving pelagic fauna from the Gulf of Marseille.
- Les pêcheries et les poissons de la Méditerranée (Provence), 1894 - Fisheries and fish of the Mediterranean (Provence).
