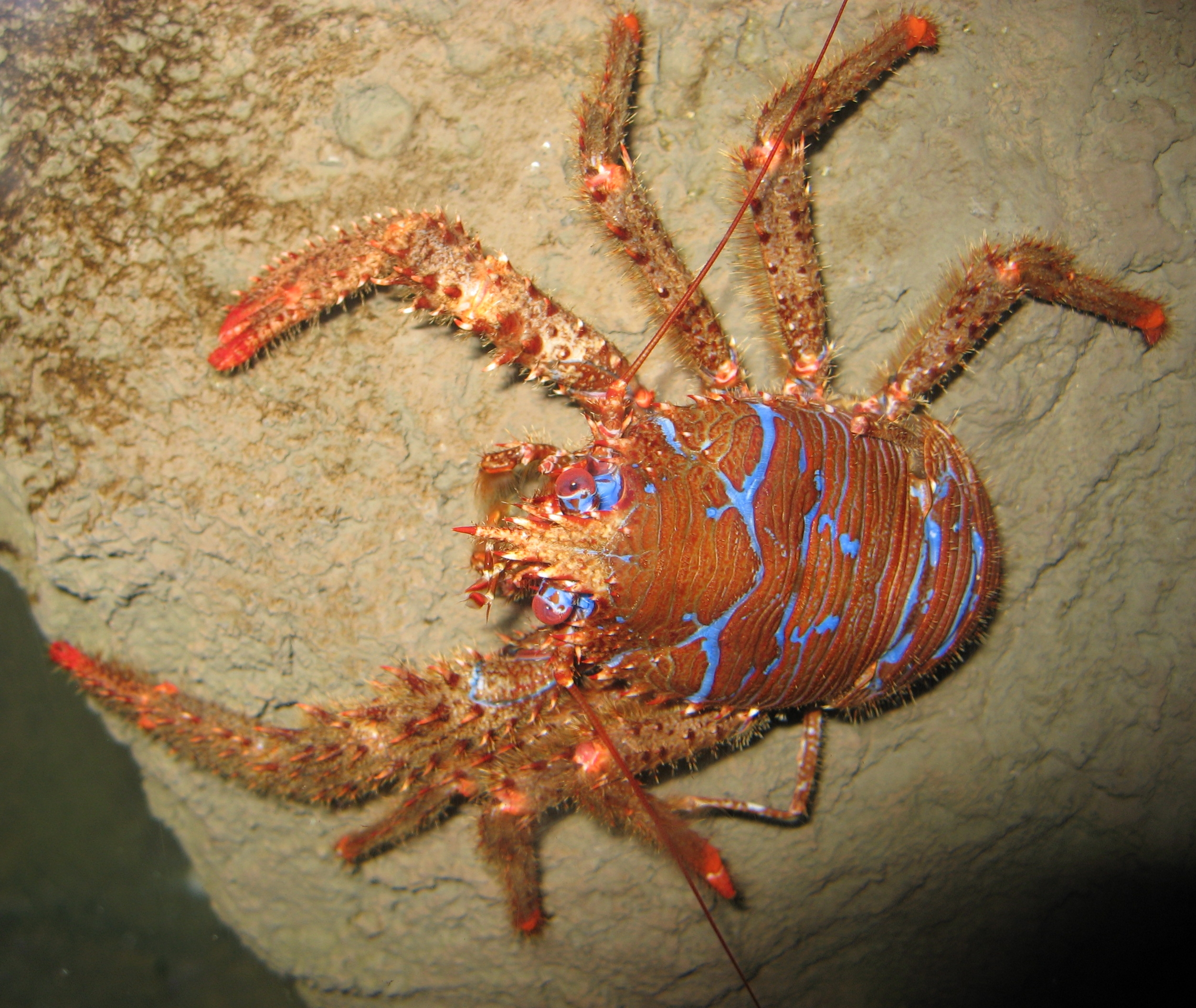
- Galathea strigosa

Scientific classification
- Kingdom: Animalia
- Phylum: Arthropoda
- Clade: Pancrustacea
- Class: Malacostraca
- Order: Decapoda
- Suborder: Pleocyemata
- Infraorder: Anomura
- Superfamily: Galatheoidea
- Family: Galatheidae; Samouelle, 1819

Genera
- see text

= Galatheidae =

Family of crustaceans

The Galatheidae are a family of squat lobsters in the superfamily Galatheoidea.

== Genera ==
There are 13 living genera and 9 extinct genera in the family Galatheidae:

- † Acanthogalathea Müller & Collins, 1991 – Upper Eocene
- Alainius Baba, 1991
- Allogalathea Baba, 1969
- Allomunida Baba, 1988
- Coralliogalathea Baba & Javed, 1974
- Fennerogalathea Baba, 1988
- Galathea Fabricius, 1793
- Janetogalathea Baba & Wicksten, 1997
- Lauriea Baba, 1971
- † Lessinigalathea De Angeli & Garassino, 2002 – Lower Eocene
- † Lophoraninella Glaessner, 1945 – Upper Cretaceous
- † Luisogalathea Karasawa & Hayakawa, 2000 – Upper Cretaceous
- Macrothea Macpherson & Cleva, 2010
- † Mesogalathea Houša, 1963 – Upper Jurassic to Cretaceous
- Nanogalathea Tirmizi & Javed, 1980
- † Palaeomunida Lőrenthey, 1901 – Upper Jurassic to Oligocene
- Phylladiorhynchus Baba, 1969
- † Spathagalathea De Angeli & Garassino, 2002 – Upper Eocene
- Triodonthea Macpherson & Robainas-Barcia, 2013
- † Tethysgalathea Klompmaker, Robins, Jakobsen & Sheldon, 2022
- Macrothea Macpherson & Cleva, 2010
- † Bolcagalathea Beschin, Busulini, Tessier & Zorzin, 2016

† = Extinct genus

Several genera that were previously part of Galatheidae were revised to be part of different families in 2010.
