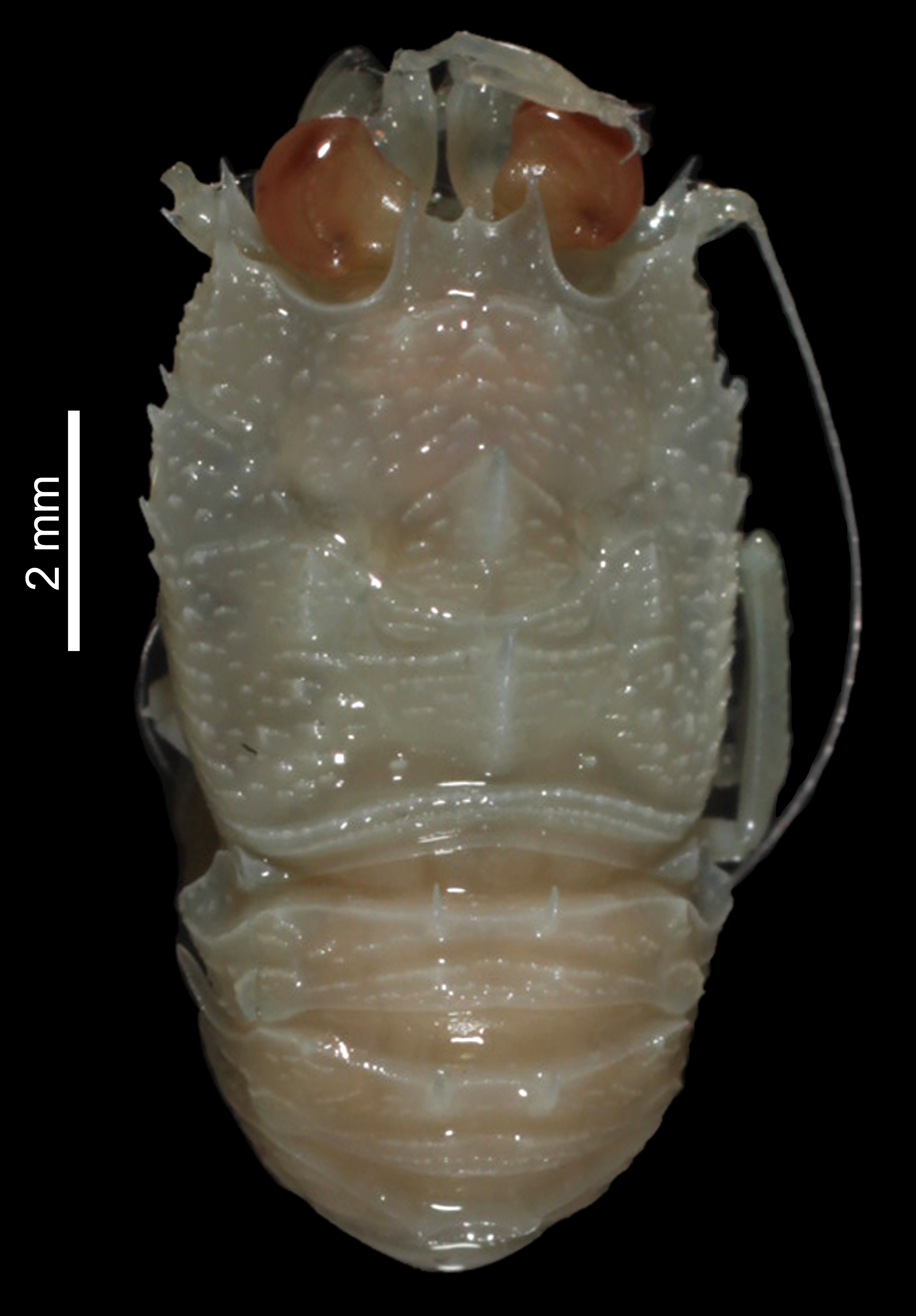

Scientific classification
- Kingdom: Animalia
- Phylum: Arthropoda
- Clade: Pancrustacea
- Class: Malacostraca
- Order: Decapoda
- Suborder: Pleocyemata
- Infraorder: Anomura
- Family: Munididae
- Genus: Bathymunida
- Species: B. dissimilis

Binomial name
- Bathymunida dissimilis Baba & de Saint Laurent, 1996

= Bathymunida dissimilis =

Species of crustacean

Bathymunida dissimilis is a species of squat lobster in the family Munididae. The binomial name is derived from the Latin dissimilis, meaning "different", in reference to its relation with and difference to B. balssi. It is found off of Futuna, at depths between about 100 and 110 metres (330 and 360 ft).
