= Bathymunida quadratirostrata =

Scientific classification
- Domain: Eukaryota
- Kingdom: Animalia
- Phylum: Arthropoda
- Class: Malacostraca
- Order: Decapoda
- Suborder: Pleocyemata
- Infraorder: Anomura
- Family: Munididae
- Genus: Bathymunida
- Species: B. quadratirostrata

Binomial name
- Bathymunida quadratirostrata Melin, 1939

Species of crustacean

Bathymunida quadratirostrata is a species of squat lobster in the family Munididae. It is found off of the Bonin Islands and the Kai Islands, at depths between about 105 and 305 metres (344 and 1,001 ft).
