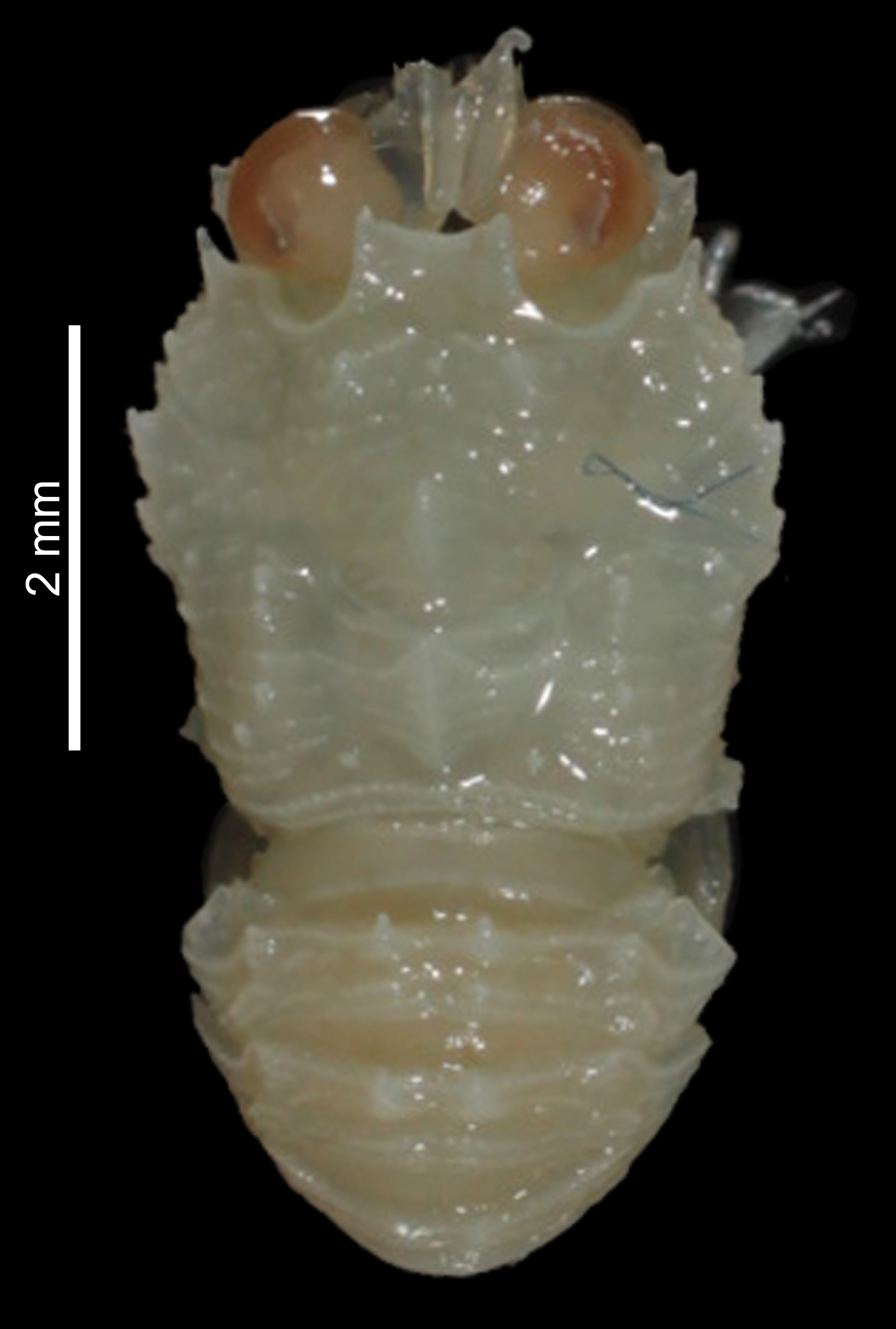

Scientific classification
- Kingdom: Animalia
- Phylum: Arthropoda
- Clade: Pancrustacea
- Class: Malacostraca
- Order: Decapoda
- Suborder: Pleocyemata
- Infraorder: Anomura
- Family: Munididae
- Genus: Bathymunida
- Species: B. frontis

Binomial name
- Bathymunida frontis Baba & de Saint Laurent, 1996

= Bathymunida frontis =

Species of crustacean

Bathymunida frontis is a species of squat lobster in the family Munididae. The specific epithet is derived from the Latin frontis, meaning "fore part", in reference to the concave appearance of the back of the rostrum. It is found off of the Kei Islands and Indonesia, at depths between about 85 and 125 metres (279 and 410 ft).
