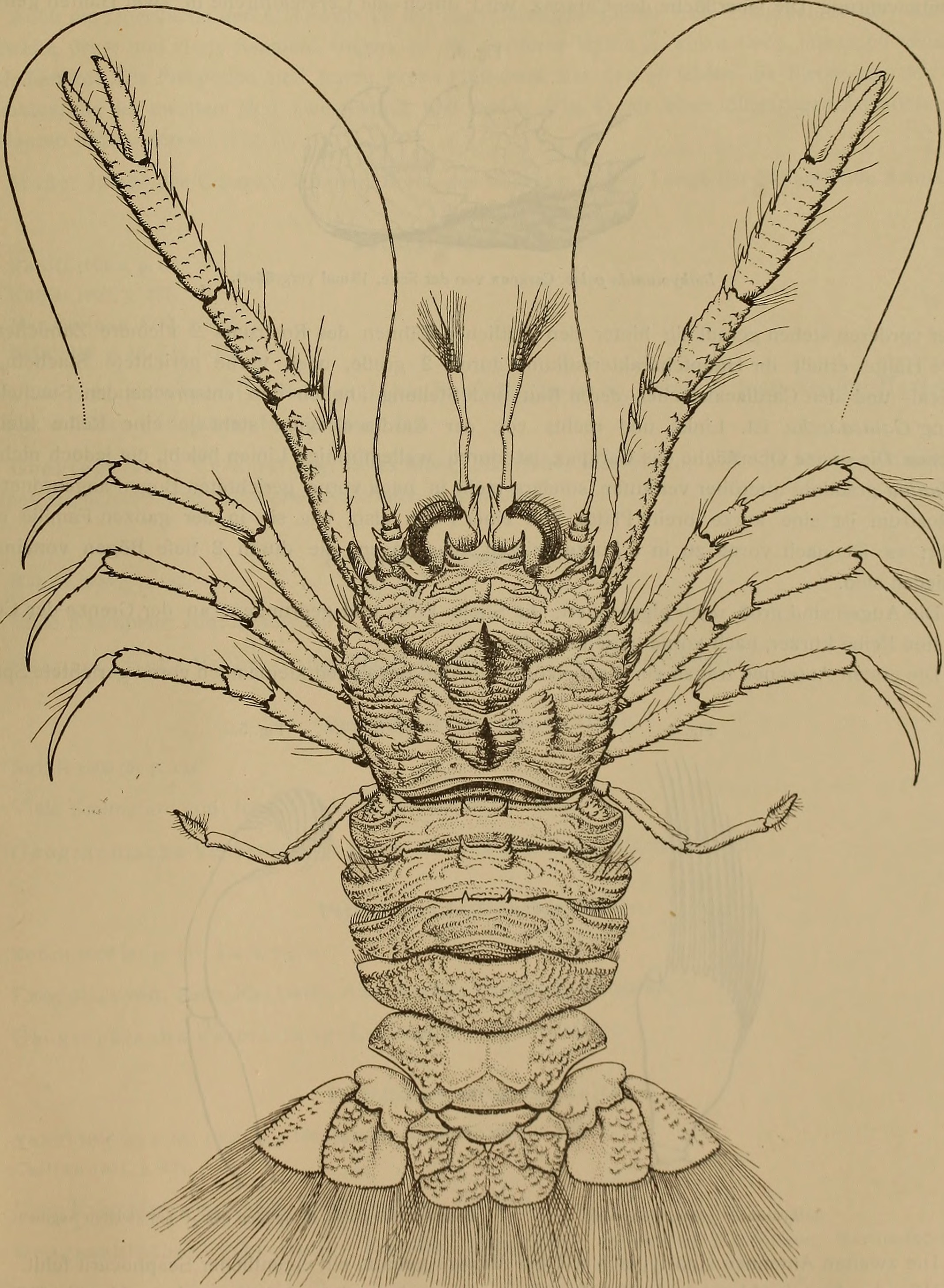

Scientific classification
- Domain: Eukaryota
- Kingdom: Animalia
- Phylum: Arthropoda
- Class: Malacostraca
- Order: Decapoda
- Suborder: Pleocyemata
- Infraorder: Anomura
- Family: Munididae
- Genus: Bathymunida
- Species: B. polae

Binomial name
- Bathymunida polae Balss, 1914

= Bathymunida polae =

Species of crustacean

Bathymunida polae is a species of squat lobster in the family Munididae. The males usually measure between 2.4 and 5.9 millimetres (0.094 and 0.232 in), with the females usually measuring between 2.6 and 5.0 millimetres (0.10 and 0.20 in). It is found in the Red Sea and off Madagascar and Réunion, at depths between about 75 and 255 metres (246 and 837 ft).
