= Bathymunida longipes =

Scientific classification
- Domain: Eukaryota
- Kingdom: Animalia
- Phylum: Arthropoda
- Class: Malacostraca
- Order: Decapoda
- Suborder: Pleocyemata
- Infraorder: Anomura
- Family: Munididae
- Genus: Bathymunida
- Species: B. longipes

Binomial name
- Bathymunida longipes Van Dam, 1938

Species of crustacean

Bathymunida longipes is a species of squat lobster in the family Munididae. The males usually measure between 5.2 and 6.0 millimetres (0.20 and 0.24 in). It is found off of Bali, near the Kangean Group and Sulu Archipelago, at depths between about 100 and 140 metres (330 and 460 ft).
