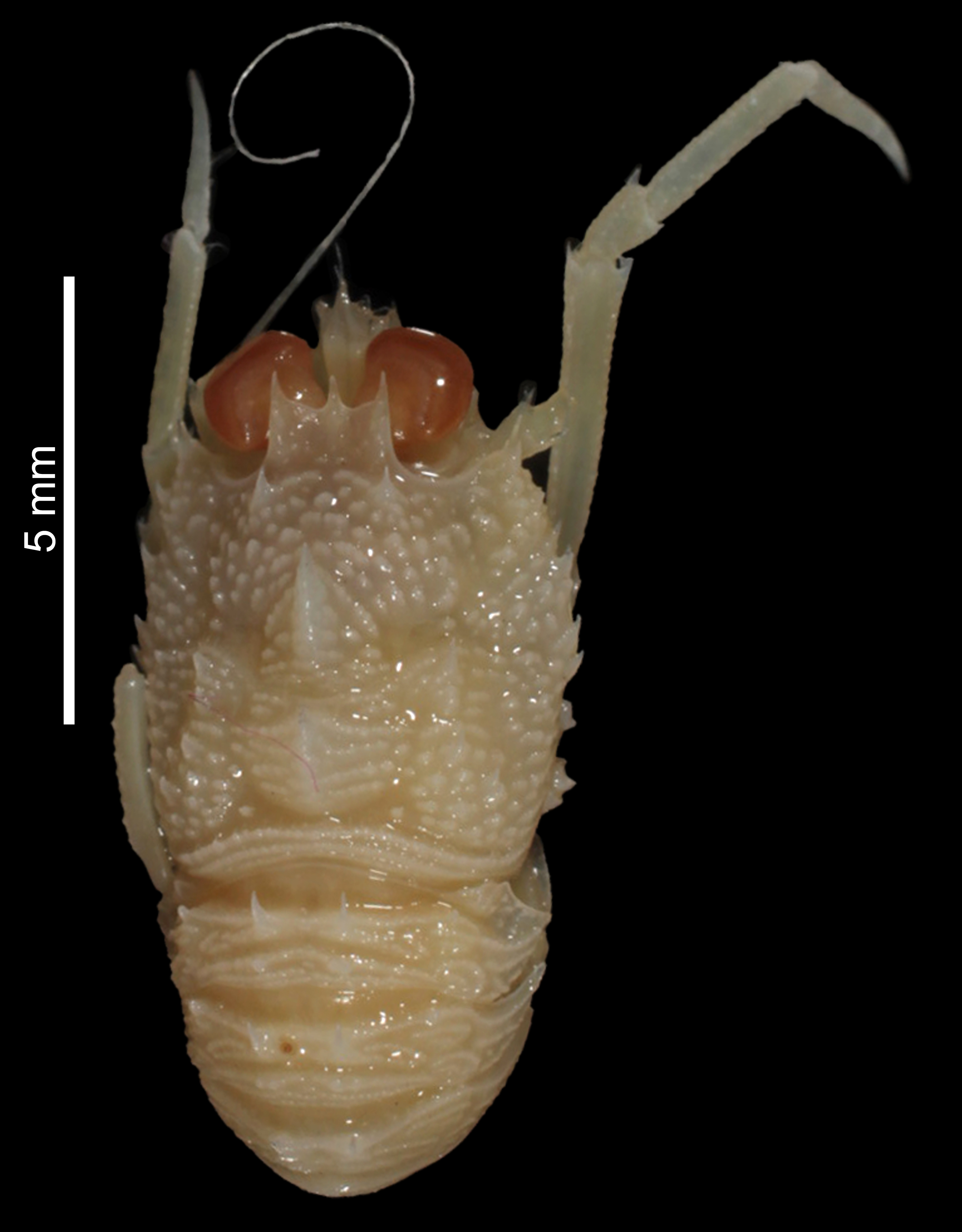

Scientific classification
- Kingdom: Animalia
- Phylum: Arthropoda
- Clade: Pancrustacea
- Class: Malacostraca
- Order: Decapoda
- Suborder: Pleocyemata
- Infraorder: Anomura
- Family: Munididae
- Genus: Bathymunida
- Species: B. rudis

Binomial name
- Bathymunida rudis Baba & de Saint Laurent, 1996

= Bathymunida rudis =

Species of crustacean

Bathymunida rudis is a species of squat lobster in the family Munididae. The specific epithet is derived from the Latin rudis, meaning rough, which is in reference to the rough upper side of the carapace. The males usually measure between 4.1 and 5.2 millimetres (0.16 and 0.20 in). It is found near Norfolk Ridge, at depths between about 110 and 155 metres (361 and 509 ft).
