= Bathymunida brevirostris =

Scientific classification
- Domain: Eukaryota
- Kingdom: Animalia
- Phylum: Arthropoda
- Class: Malacostraca
- Order: Decapoda
- Suborder: Pleocyemata
- Infraorder: Anomura
- Family: Munididae
- Genus: Bathymunida
- Species: B. brevirostris

Binomial name
- Bathymunida brevirostris (Yokoya, 1933)

Species of crustacean

Bathymunida brevirostris is a species of squat lobster in the family Munididae. The males usually measure between 5.0 and 5.6 millimetres (0.20 and 0.22 in). It is found off of northwestern Kyushu, an island in the Japanese archipelago, at depths of about 105 metres (344 ft).
