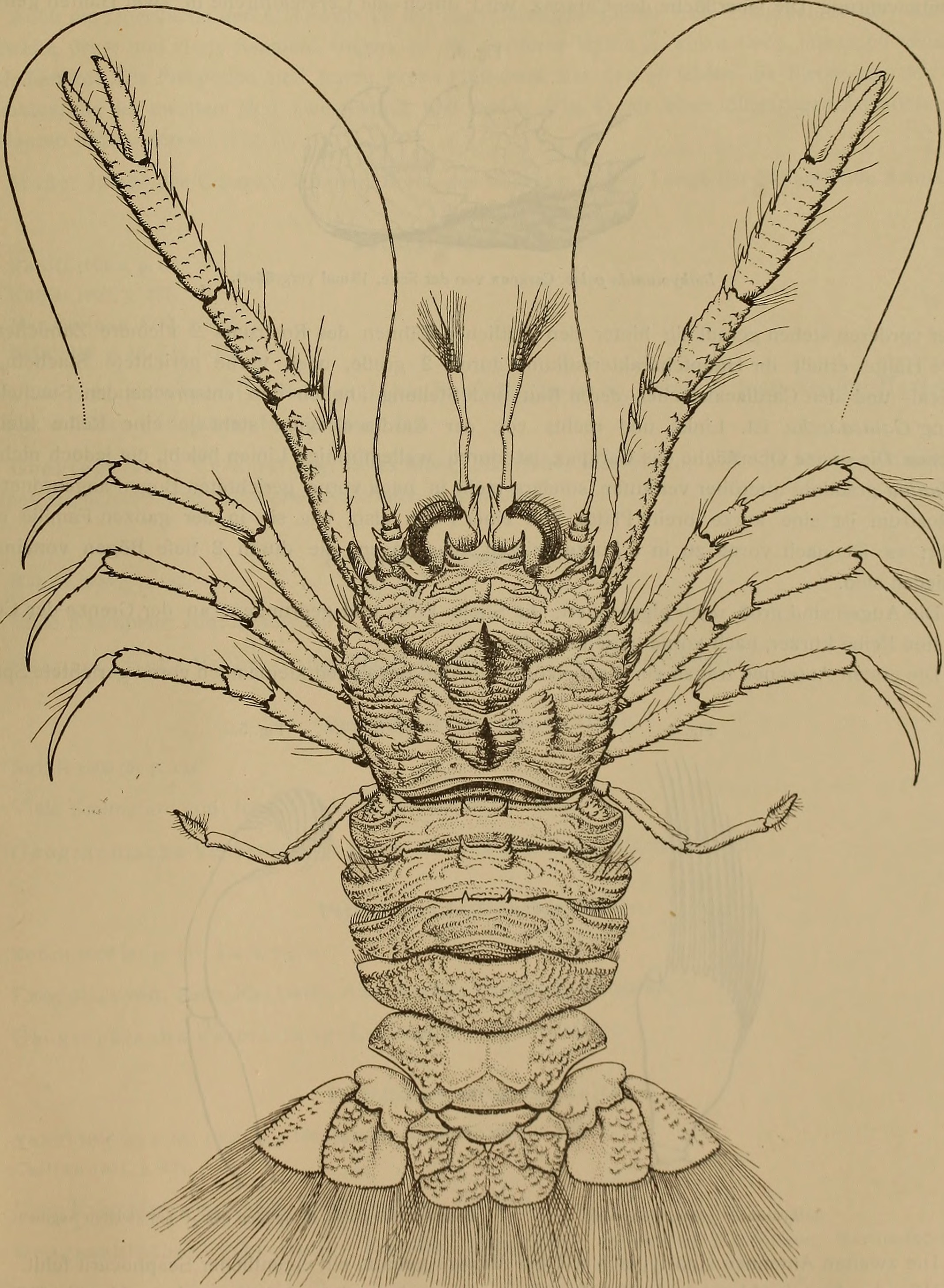
- Bathymunida polae

Scientific classification
- Kingdom: Animalia
- Phylum: Arthropoda
- Clade: Pancrustacea
- Class: Malacostraca
- Order: Decapoda
- Suborder: Pleocyemata
- Infraorder: Anomura
- Family: Munididae
- Genus: Bathymunida; Balss, 1914

= Bathymunida =

Genus of crustaceans

Bathymunida is a genus of squat lobsters in the family Munididae, containing the following species:

- Bathymunida avatea Macpherson & Baba, 2006
- Bathymunida balssi Van Dam, 1938
- Bathymunida brevirostris (Yokoya, 1933)
- Bathymunida corniculata Macpherson, 2013
- Bathymunida dissimilis Baba & de Saint Laurent, 1996
- Bathymunida eurybregma Baba & de Saint Laurent, 1996
- Bathymunida frontis Baba & de Saint Laurent, 1996
- Bathymunida longipes Van Dam, 1938
- Bathymunida nebulosa Baba & de Saint Laurent, 1996
- Bathymunida ocularis Baba & de Saint Laurent, 1996
- Bathymunida polae Balss, 1914
- Bathymunida quadratirostrata Melin, 1939
- Bathymunida recta Baba & de Saint Laurent, 1996
- Bathymunida rudis Baba & de Saint Laurent, 1996
- Bathymunida sibogae Van Dam, 1938
