= Bathymunida sibogae =

Scientific classification
- Domain: Eukaryota
- Kingdom: Animalia
- Phylum: Arthropoda
- Class: Malacostraca
- Order: Decapoda
- Suborder: Pleocyemata
- Infraorder: Anomura
- Family: Munididae
- Genus: Bathymunida
- Species: B. sibogae

Binomial name
- Bathymunida sibogae Van Dam, 1938

Species of crustacean

Bathymunida sibogae is a species of squat lobster in the family Munididae. It is found in the Ceram Sea and off of the Kei Islands, New Caledonia, Chesterfield Islands, and Japan, at depths between about 120 and 345 metres (394 and 1,132 ft).
