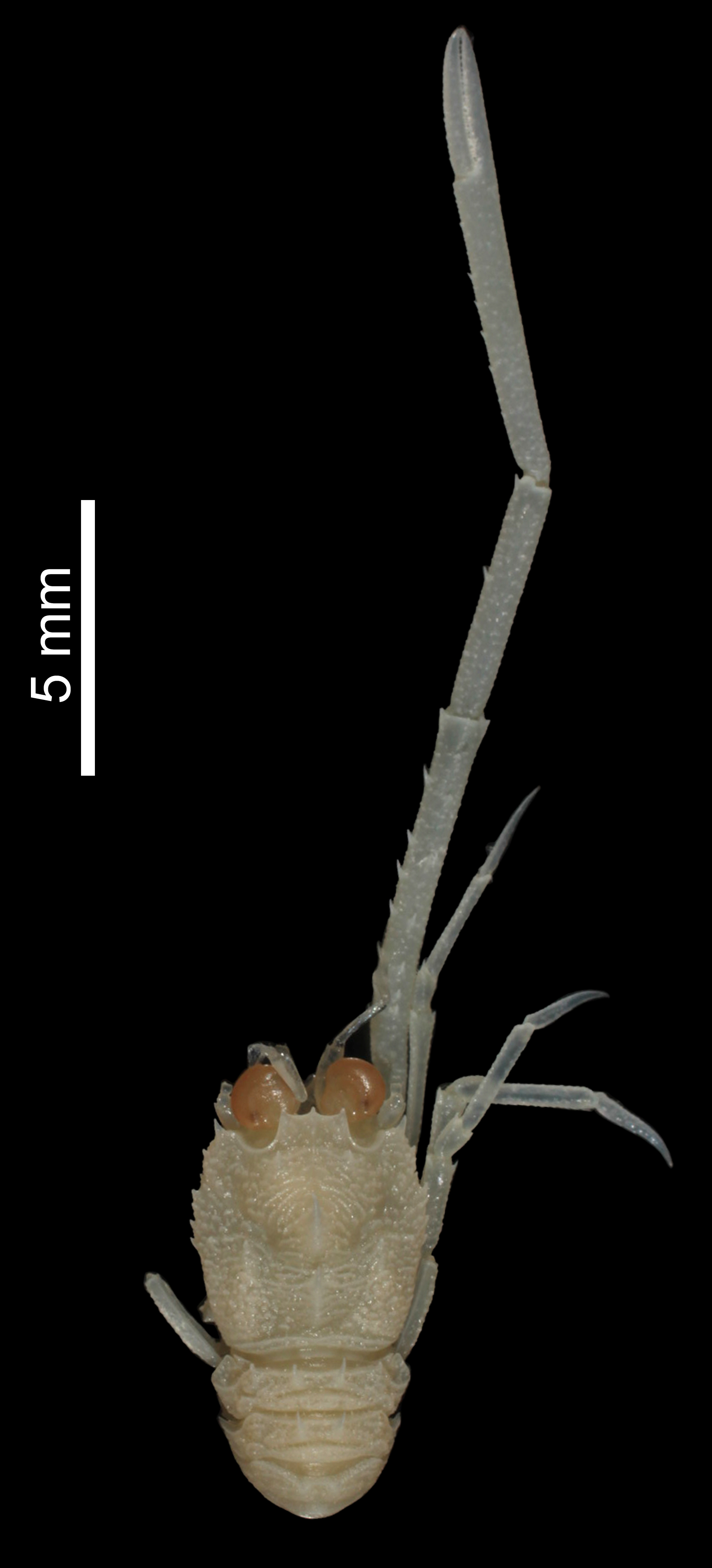

Scientific classification
- Kingdom: Animalia
- Phylum: Arthropoda
- Clade: Pancrustacea
- Class: Malacostraca
- Order: Decapoda
- Suborder: Pleocyemata
- Infraorder: Anomura
- Family: Munididae
- Genus: Bathymunida
- Species: B. eurybregma

Binomial name
- Bathymunida eurybregma Baba & de Saint Laurent, 1996

= Bathymunida eurybregma =

Species of crustacean

Bathymunida eurybregma is a species of squat lobster in the family Munididae. The name is from the Greek eurys, meaning "broad", and bregma, meaning "front of the head", in reference to its broad rostrum. The males usually measure between 3.1 and 4.9 millimetres (0.12 and 0.19 in). It is found off of the Chesterfield Islands and Loyalty Islands, at depths between about 270 and 380 metres (890 and 1,250 ft).
