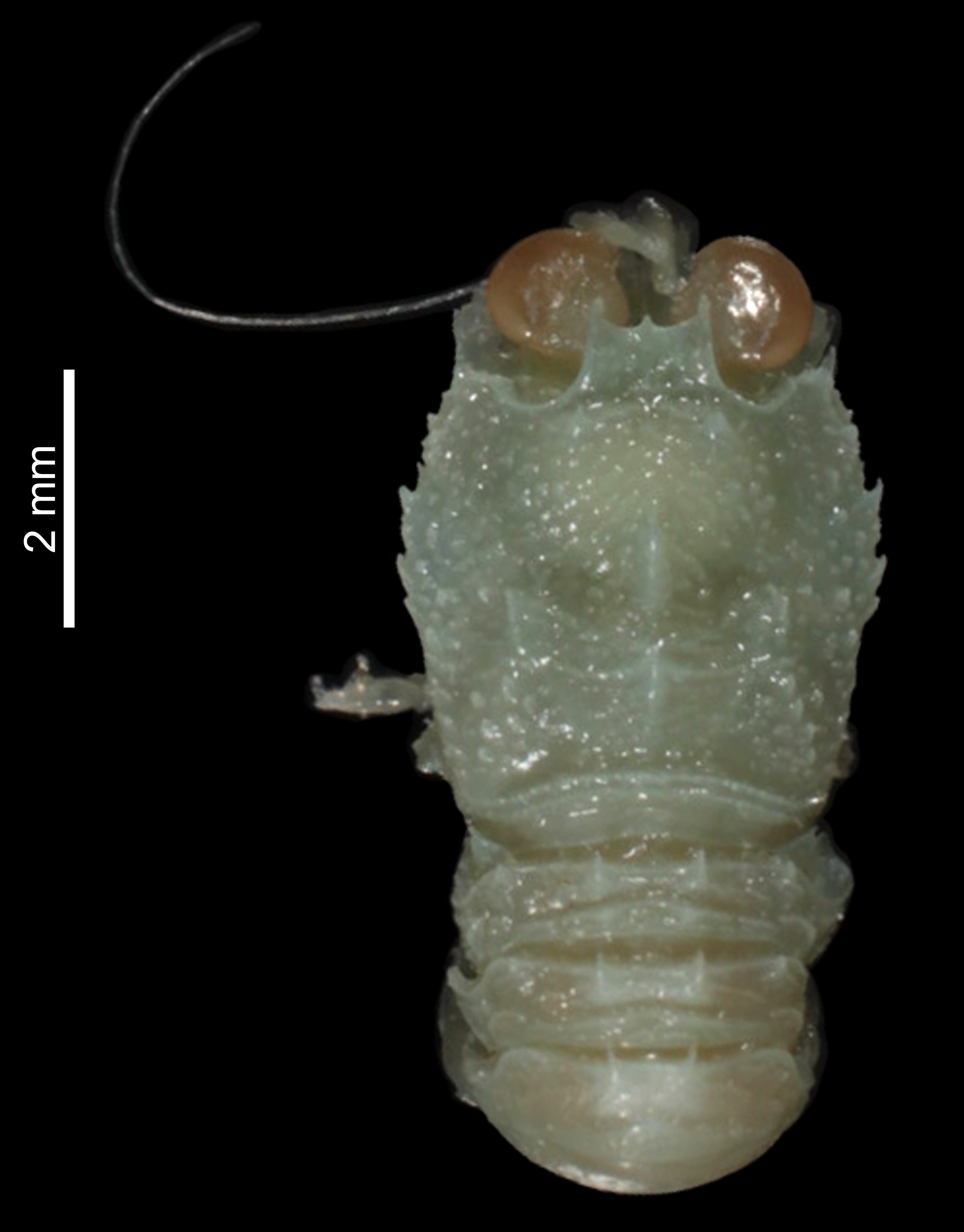

Scientific classification
- Kingdom: Animalia
- Phylum: Arthropoda
- Clade: Pancrustacea
- Class: Malacostraca
- Order: Decapoda
- Suborder: Pleocyemata
- Infraorder: Anomura
- Family: Munididae
- Genus: Bathymunida
- Species: B. ocularis

Binomial name
- Bathymunida ocularis Baba & de Saint Laurent, 1996

= Bathymunida ocularis =

Species of crustacean

Bathymunida ocularis is a species of squat lobster in the family Munididae. The specific epithet is derived from the Latin ocularis, meaning "of the eyes", in reference to the granulated eyestalks that are unique to the species. It is found off of the Loyality Islands, at depths of about 240 metres (790 ft).
