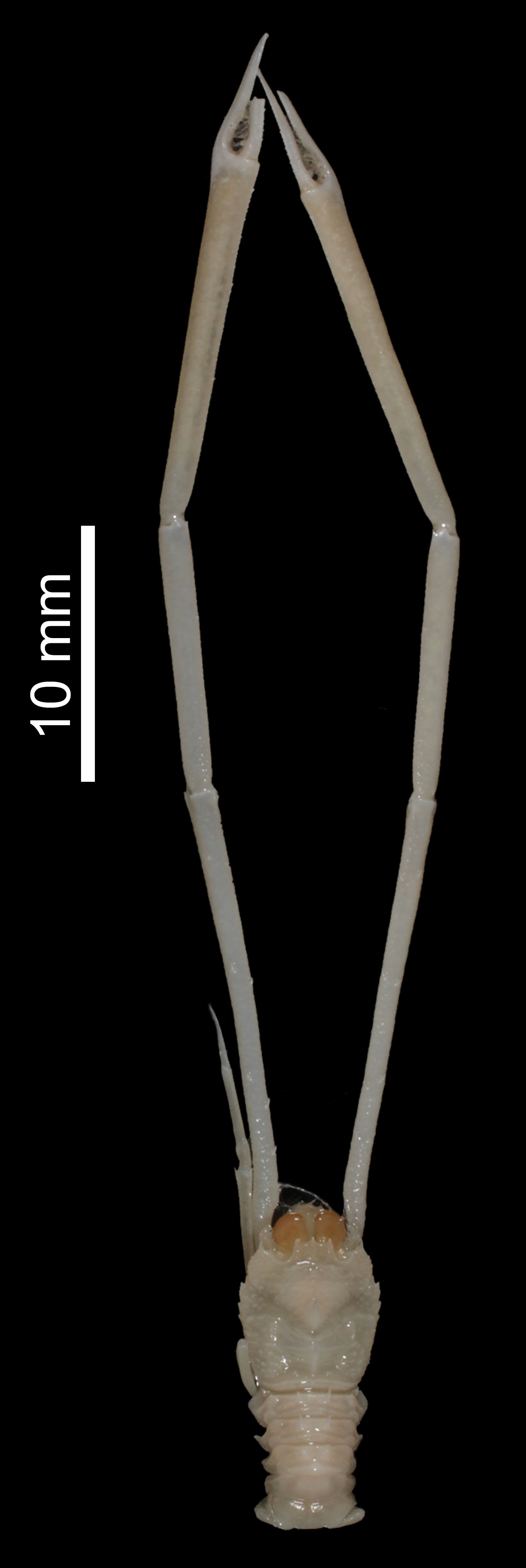

Scientific classification
- Kingdom: Animalia
- Phylum: Arthropoda
- Clade: Pancrustacea
- Class: Malacostraca
- Order: Decapoda
- Suborder: Pleocyemata
- Infraorder: Anomura
- Family: Munididae
- Genus: Bathymunida
- Species: B. recta

Binomial name
- Bathymunida recta Baba & de Saint Laurent, 1996

= Bathymunida recta =

Species of crustacean

Bathymunida recta is a species of squat lobster in the family Munididae. It is found off of Futuna Island, at depths between about 280 and 370 metres (920 and 1,210 ft).
