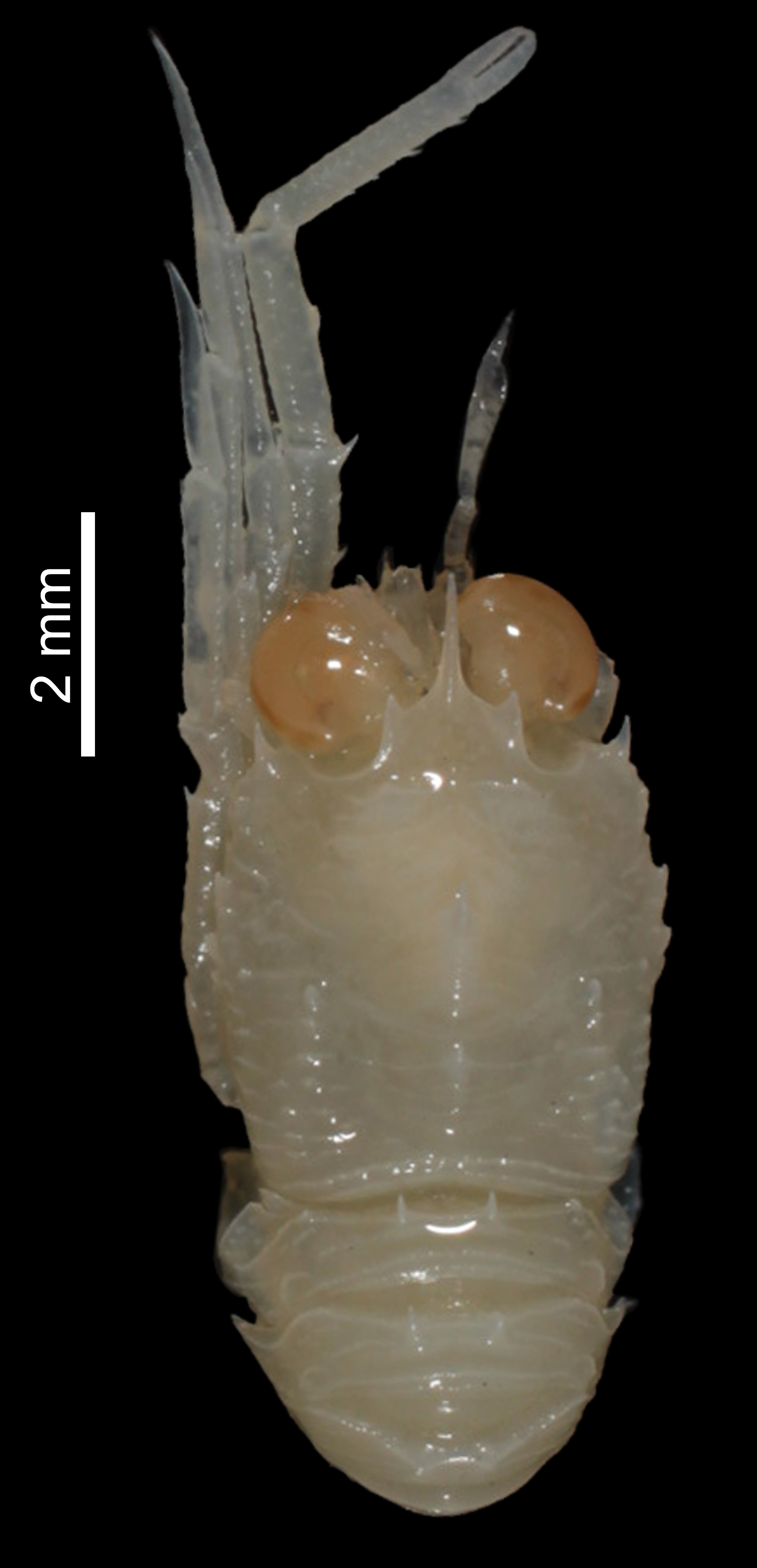

Scientific classification
- Kingdom: Animalia
- Phylum: Arthropoda
- Clade: Pancrustacea
- Class: Malacostraca
- Order: Decapoda
- Suborder: Pleocyemata
- Infraorder: Anomura
- Family: Munididae
- Genus: Bathymunida
- Species: B. nebulosa

Binomial name
- Bathymunida nebulosa Baba & de Saint Laurent, 1996

= Bathymunida nebulosa =

Species of crustacean

Bathymunida nebulosa is a species of squat lobster in the family Munididae. The specific epithet is derived from the Latin nebulosus, meaning "indefinite" or "obscure", in reference to the weak striae on the carapace. The males usually measure between 3.2 and 5.2 millimetres (0.13 and 0.20 in), with the females usually measuring between 3.0 and 3.6 millimetres (0.12 and 0.14 in). It is found off of the Chesterfield Islands and the Matthew and Hunter Islands, at depths between about 300 and 610 metres (980 and 2,000 ft).
