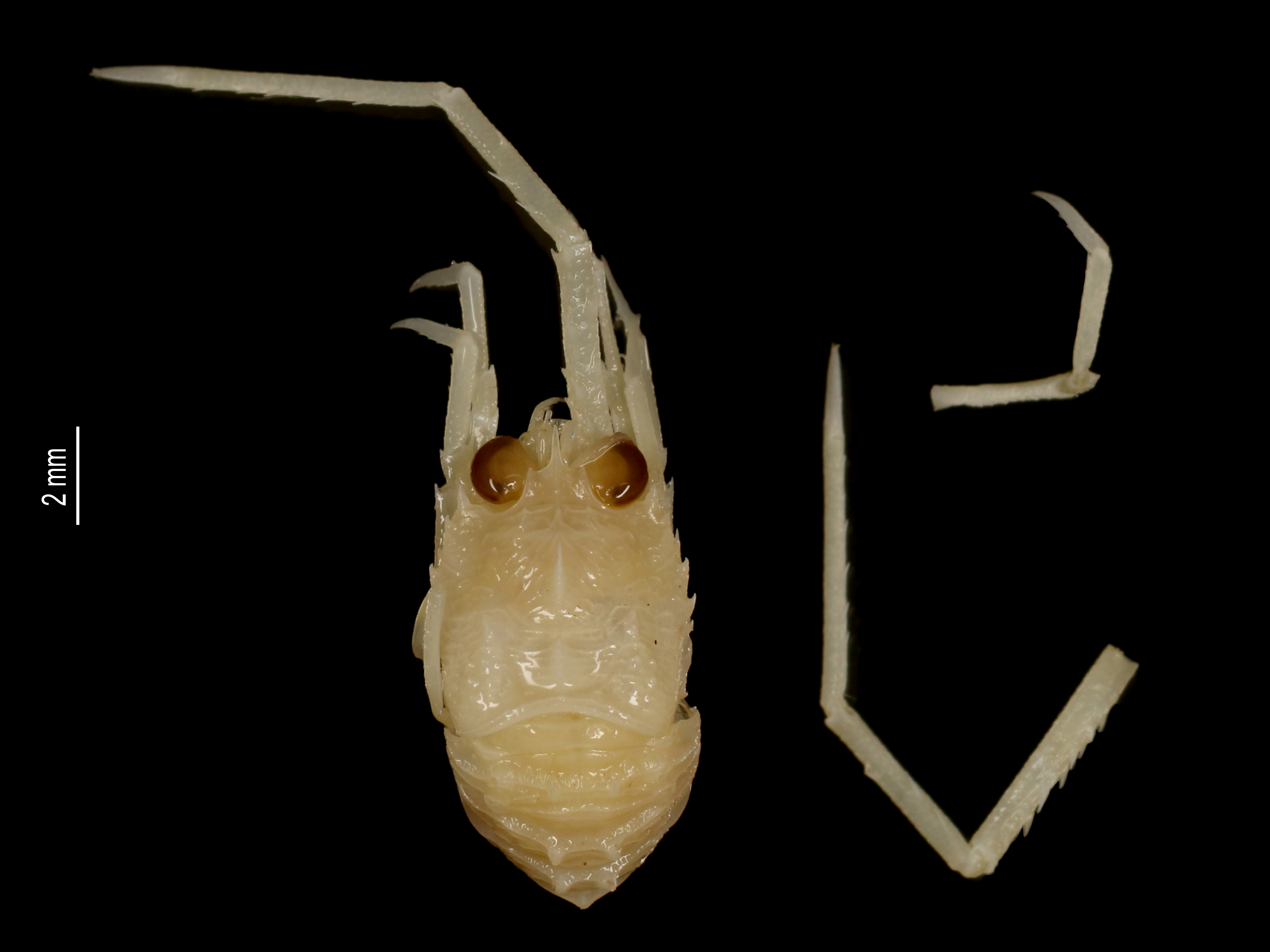

Scientific classification
- Kingdom: Animalia
- Phylum: Arthropoda
- Clade: Pancrustacea
- Class: Malacostraca
- Order: Decapoda
- Suborder: Pleocyemata
- Infraorder: Anomura
- Family: Munididae
- Genus: Bathymunida
- Species: B. avatea

Binomial name
- Bathymunida avatea Macpherson & Baba, 2006

= Bathymunida avatea =

Species of crustacean

Bathymunida avatea is a species of squat lobster in the family Munididae. The name is derived from the goddess of the moon, Avatea, in Cook Islands mythology. It is found off of French Polynesia and Tonga, at depths of about 455 metres (1,493 ft).
