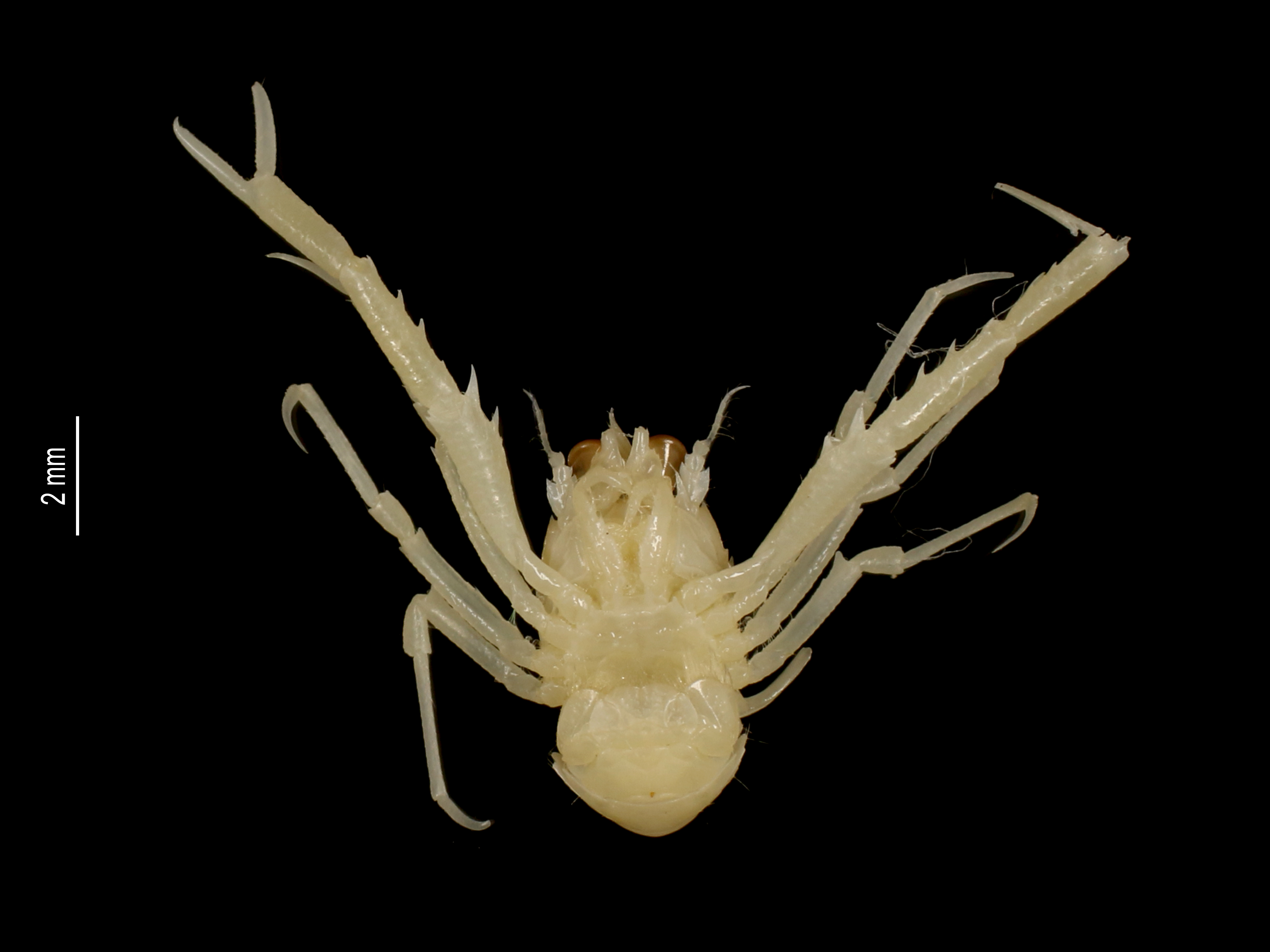

Scientific classification
- Kingdom: Animalia
- Phylum: Arthropoda
- Clade: Pancrustacea
- Class: Malacostraca
- Order: Decapoda
- Suborder: Pleocyemata
- Infraorder: Anomura
- Family: Munididae
- Genus: Bathymunida
- Species: B. corniculata

Binomial name
- Bathymunida corniculata Macpherson, 2013

= Bathymunida corniculata =

Species of crustacean

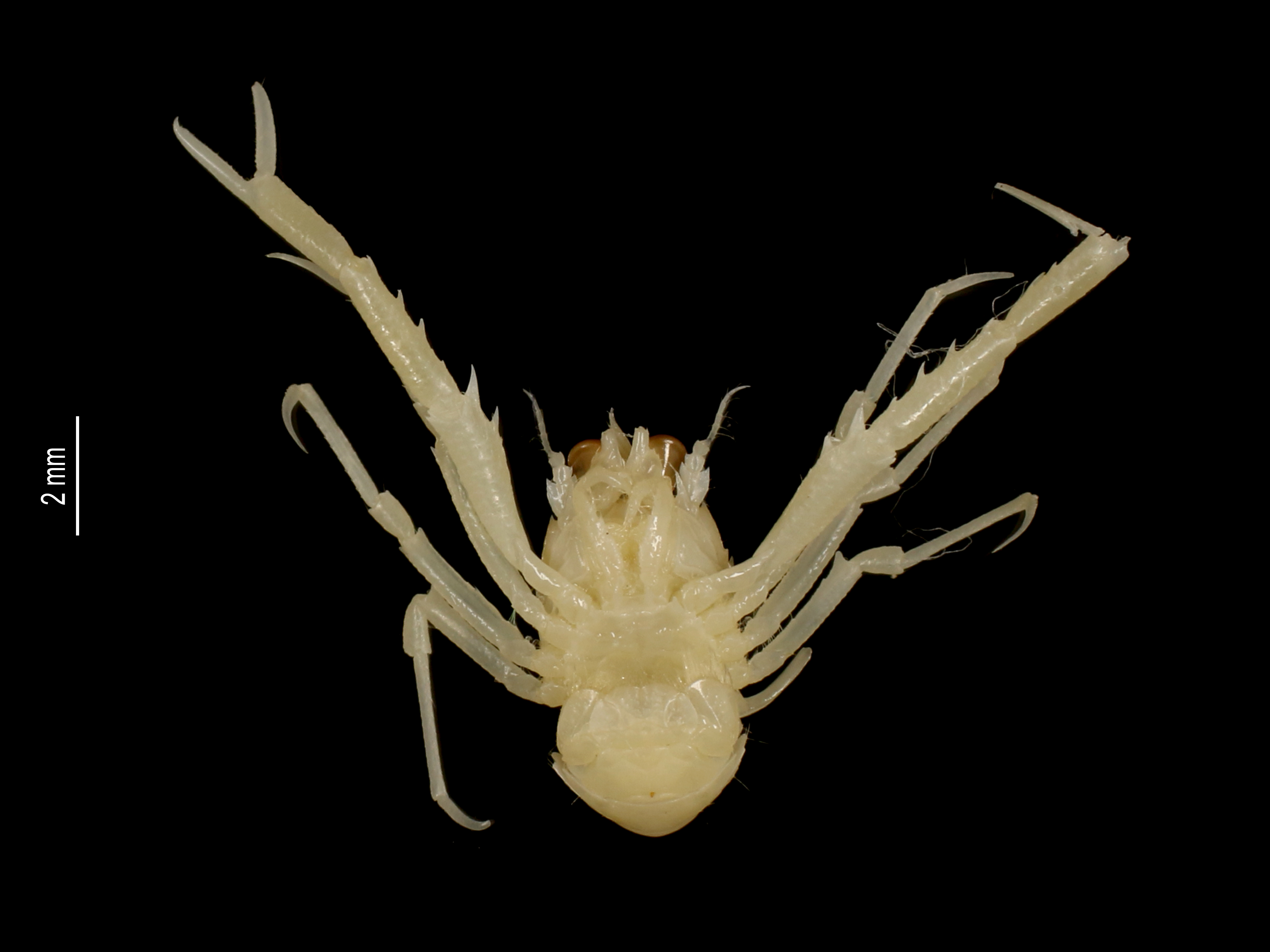
Bathymunida corniculata

Bathymunida corniculata is a species of squat lobster in the family Munididae found in French Polynesia.
