= Bathymunida balssi =

Scientific classification
- Domain: Eukaryota
- Kingdom: Animalia
- Phylum: Arthropoda
- Class: Malacostraca
- Order: Decapoda
- Suborder: Pleocyemata
- Infraorder: Anomura
- Family: Munididae
- Genus: Bathymunida
- Species: B. balssi

Binomial name
- Bathymunida balssi Van Dam, 1938

Species of crustacean

Bathymunida balssi is a species of squat lobster in the family Munididae. The males usually measure between 2.0 and 3.2 millimetres (0.079 and 0.126 in), with the females usually measuring between 2.0 and 3.3 millimetres (0.079 and 0.130 in). It is found in the Ceram Sea and off of New Caledonia, at depths between about 110 and 195 metres (361 and 640 ft).
