= List of xiphosuran genera =

This list of xiphosurans is a comprehensive listing of all genera that have ever been included in the order Xiphosura, excluding purely vernacular terms. The list includes all commonly accepted genera, but also genera that are now considered invalid, doubtful (nomen dubium), or were not formally published (nomen nudum), as well as junior synonyms of more established names, genera that are no longer considered xiphosurans and misspellings. The list currently includes 54 names out of which 31 are considered valid xiphosuran genera.

As of 2019 there were around 80 extinct species of xiphosurans and 4 extant species of xiphosurans recognized as valid.

== Naming conventions and terminology ==
There is no "official" or "canonical" list of xiphosuran genera. The closest thing is found contained in the regularly updated Summary list of fossil spiders and their relatives in the World Spider Catalog, which includes just the extinct species. The vast majority or all of the content of the list below, including the valid genera, preoccupied names, junior synonyms, misspellings, taxonomical classifications and sites of discovery, is based upon the 2019 edition of the summary list.

Naming conventions and terminology follow the International Code of Zoological Nomenclature. Technical terms used include:

- Junior synonym: A name which describes the same taxon as a previously published name. If two or more genera are formally designated and the type specimens are later assigned to the same genus, the first to be published (in chronological order) is the senior synonym, and all other instances are junior synonyms. Senior synonyms are generally used, except by special decision of the ICZN, but junior synonyms cannot be used again, even if deprecated. Junior synonymy is often subjective, unless the genera described were both based on the same type specimen.
- Nomen nudum (Latin for "naked name"): A name that has appeared in print but has not yet been formally published by the standards of the ICZN. Nomina nuda (the plural form) are invalid, and are therefore not italicized as a proper generic name would be. If the name is later formally published, that name is no longer a nomen nudum and will be italicized on this list. Often, the formally published name will differ from any nomina nuda that describe the same specimen.
- Nomen oblitum (Latin for "forgotten name"): A name that has not been used in the scientific community for more than fifty years after its original proposal.
- Preoccupied name: A name that is formally published, but which has already been used for another taxon. This second use is invalid (as are all subsequent uses) and the name must be replaced. As preoccupied names are not valid generic names, they will also go unitalicized on this list.
- Nomen dubium (Latin for "dubious name"): A name describing a fossil with no unique diagnostic features.

== Xiphosuran genera ==
Valid genera
Non-valid genera

† = Extinct

Genus	Author(s)	Year	Status	Age	Location	Notes
†Alanops	Racheboeuf	2002	Valid	Carboniferous	France	
†Anacontium	Raymond	1944	Valid	Permian	United States	
†Archeolimulus	Chlupáč	1963	Valid	Middle Ordovician	Czech Republic	
†Austrolimulus	Riek	1955	Valid	Triassic	Australia	
†Belinuropsis	Matthew	1910	Nomen dubium	Carboniferous	Canada	Too poorly preserved to be assigned to any particular arthropod group.
†Belinurus	Bronn	1839	Valid	Carboniferous	Canada; England; United States; Ukraine; Wales	
†Bellinuroopsis	Chernyshev	1933	Valid	Devonian	Russia	
†Bellinurus	Pictet	1846	Synonym	N/A	N/A	Invalid name, Belinurus (Bronn, 1839) has priority.
†Bifarius	Tasch	1961	Misidentification	N/A	N/A	Misidentified, an insect.
Carcinoscorpius	Pocock	1902	Valid	??? – present	India; Indonesia; Malaysia; Philippines; Singapore; Thailand	
†Casterolimulus	Holland, Erickson & O’Brien	1975	Valid	Cretaceous	United States	
†Ciurcalimulus	Lamsdell	2025	Valid	Silurian	United States	
†Crenatolimulus	Feldmann, Schweitzer, Dattilo & Farlow	2011	Valid	Cretaceous	United States	
†Dubbolimulus	Pickett	1984	Jr. synonym	N/A	N/A	Synonym of Paleolimulus.
†Elleria	Raymond	1944	Valid	Devonian	United States	
†Elmocephalus	Tasch	1963	Misidentification	N/A	N/A	Misidentified, a crustacean?
†Eolimulus	Moberg	1892	Nomen dubium	Cambrian	Sweden	
†Euproops	Meek	1867	Valid	Carboniferous - Permian?	England; France; Germany; South Korea; United States; Wales	
†Heterolimulus	Via Boada & Villalta	1966	Jr. synonym	N/A	N/A	Synonym of Tachypleus.
†Hypatocephala	Tasch	1961	Misidentification	N/A	N/A	Misidentified, an insect.
†Kasibelinurus	Pickett	1993	Valid	Devonian	Australia; China	
†Koenigiella	Raymond	1944	Jr. synonym	N/A	N/A	Synonym of Bellinurus.
†Lemoneites	Flower	1969	Misidentification	N/A	N/A	Misidentified, an echinoderm.
†Limulitella	Størmer	1952	Valid	Triassic – Jurassic	France; Germany; Madagascar; Netherlands; Russia; Tunisia	
†Limulites	Schimper	1853	Preoccupied	N/A	N/A	Preoccupied name, changed to Limulitella.
Limulus	Müller	1785	Valid	Triassic – present	England; Germany; Mexico; Poland; United States	
†Liomesaspis	Raymond	1944	Valid	Carboniferous - Permian	Germany; United Kingdom; United States	
†Lophodesmus	Tesakov & Alekseev	1992	Preoccupied	N/A	N/A	Preoccupied name, changed to Maldybulakia.
†Lunataspis	Young & Nowlan	2008	Valid	Ordovician	Canada	
†Maldybulakia	Tesakov & Alekseev	1998	Valid	Silurian	Australia; Kazakhstan	
†Mesolimulus	Størmer	1952	Valid	Triassic – Cretaceous	England; Germany; Russia; Spain	
†Neobelinuropsis	Eller	1938	Jr. synonym	N/A	N/A	Synonym of Bellinuroopsis.
†Palatinaspis	Malz & Poschmann	1993	Jr. synonym	N/A	N/A	Synonym of Liomesaspis.
†Paleolimulus	Dunbar	1923	Valid	Carboniferous - Triassic	Australia; Germany; Russia; United States; Ukraine	
†Panduralimulus	Allen & Feldman	2005	Valid	Permian	United States	
†Permolimulinella	Tasch	1963	Misidentification	N/A	N/A	Misidentified, an insect.
†Pincombella	Chapman	1932	Misidentification	N/A	N/A	Misidentified, an insect.
†Prestwichia	Woodward	1867	Preoccupied	N/A	N/A	Preoccupied name, changed to Euproops.
†Prestwichianella	Cockerell	1905	Replacement name	N/A	N/A	Replacement name for Prestwichia.
†Pringlia	Raymond	1944	Jr. synonym	N/A	N/A	Synonym of Liomesaspis.
†Prolimulus	Frič	1899	Valid	Carboniferous	Czech Republic	
†Psammolimulus	Lange	1923	Valid	Triassic	Germany	
†Rolfeia	Waterston	1985	Valid	Carboniferous	Scotland	
†Steropsis	Baily	1869	Jr. synonym	N/A	N/A	Synonym of Bellinurus.
†Strongylocephalus	Tasch	1961	Misidentification	N/A	N/A	Misidentified, an insect.
Tachypleus	Leach	1819	Valid	Triassic – present	China; Indonesia; Japan; Lebanon; Malaysia; Philippines; South Korea; Spain; Taiwan; Vietnam	
†Tarracolimulus	Romero & Via Boada	1977	Valid	Triassic	Spain	
†Vaderlimulus	Lerner, Lucas & Lockley	2017	Valid	Triassic	United States	
†Valloisella	Racheboeuf	1992	Valid	Carboniferous	France	
†"Veltheimia"	Beyschlag & von Fritsch	1899	Nomen nudum	Carboniferous?	Germany	
†Victalimulus	Riek & Gill	1971	Valid	Cretaceous	Australia	
†Willwerathia	Størmer	1969	Valid	Devonian	Germany	
†Xaniopyramis	Siveter & Selden	1987	Valid	Carboniferous	England	
Xiphosura			Jr. synonym	N/A	N/A	Synonym of Limulus.
†Xiphosuroides	Shpinev & Vasilenko	2018	Valid	Carboniferous	Russia	
†Yunnanolimulus	Zhang, Hu, Zhou, Iv & Bai	2009	Valid	Triassic	China	

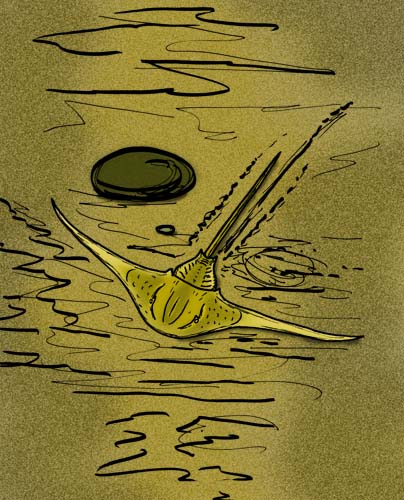
Austrolimulus fletcheri

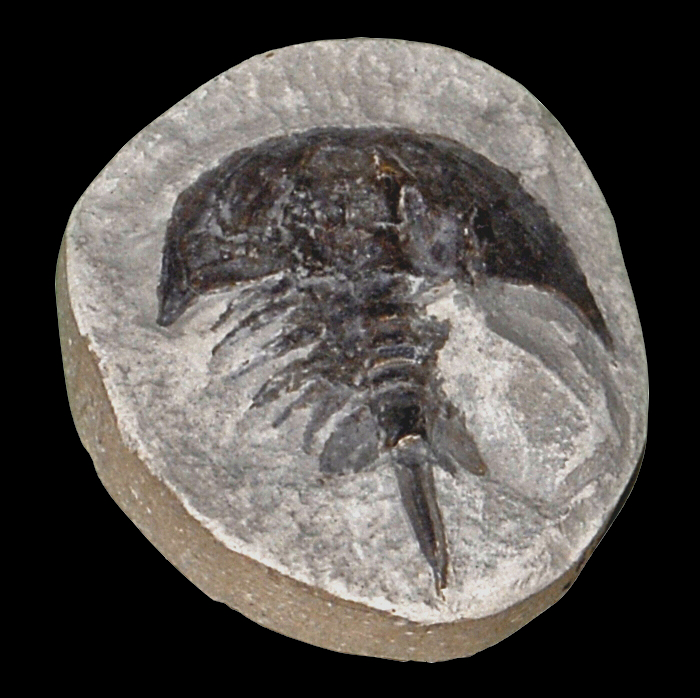
Belinurus lunatus

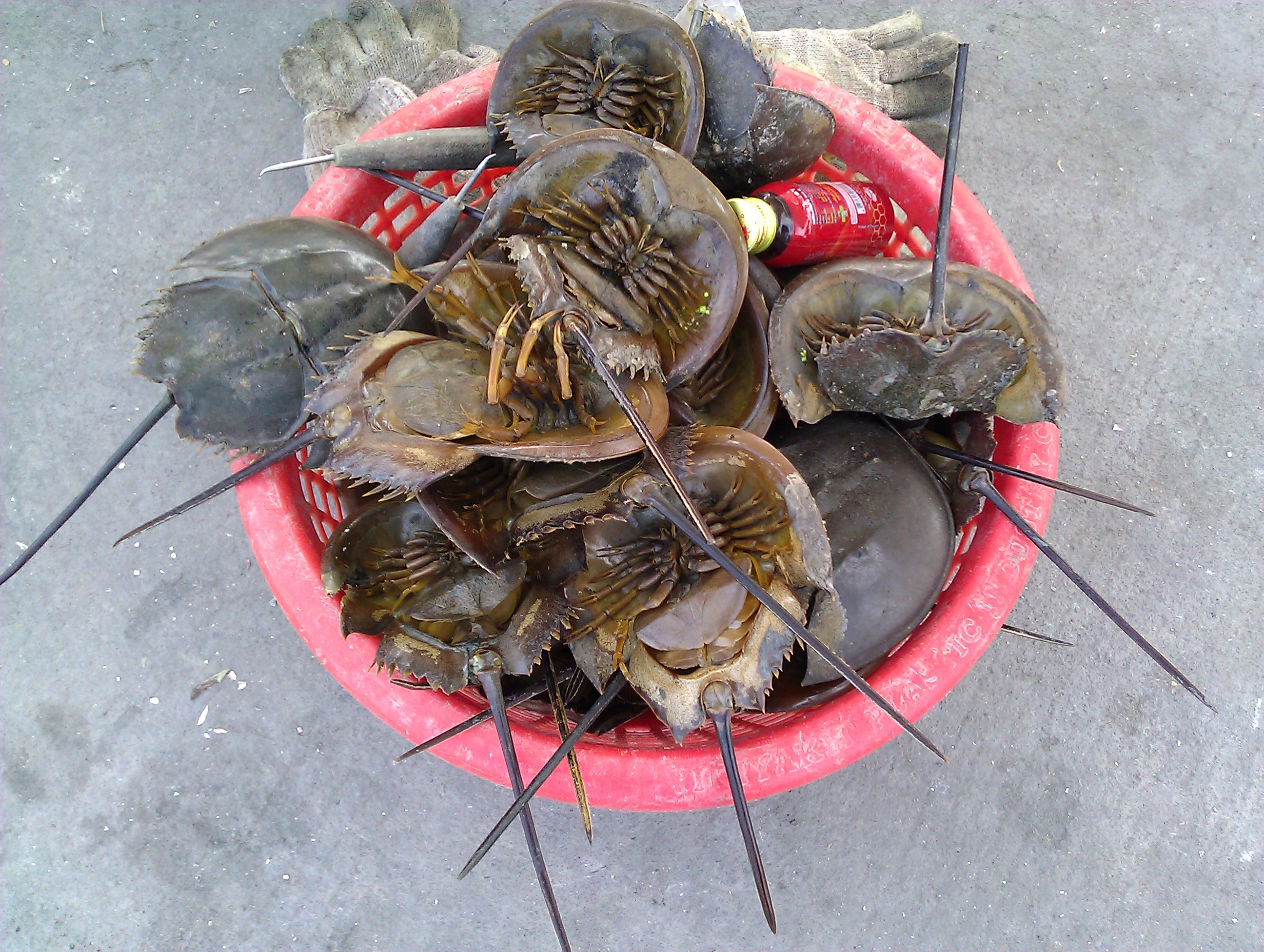
Carcinoscorpius rotundicauda

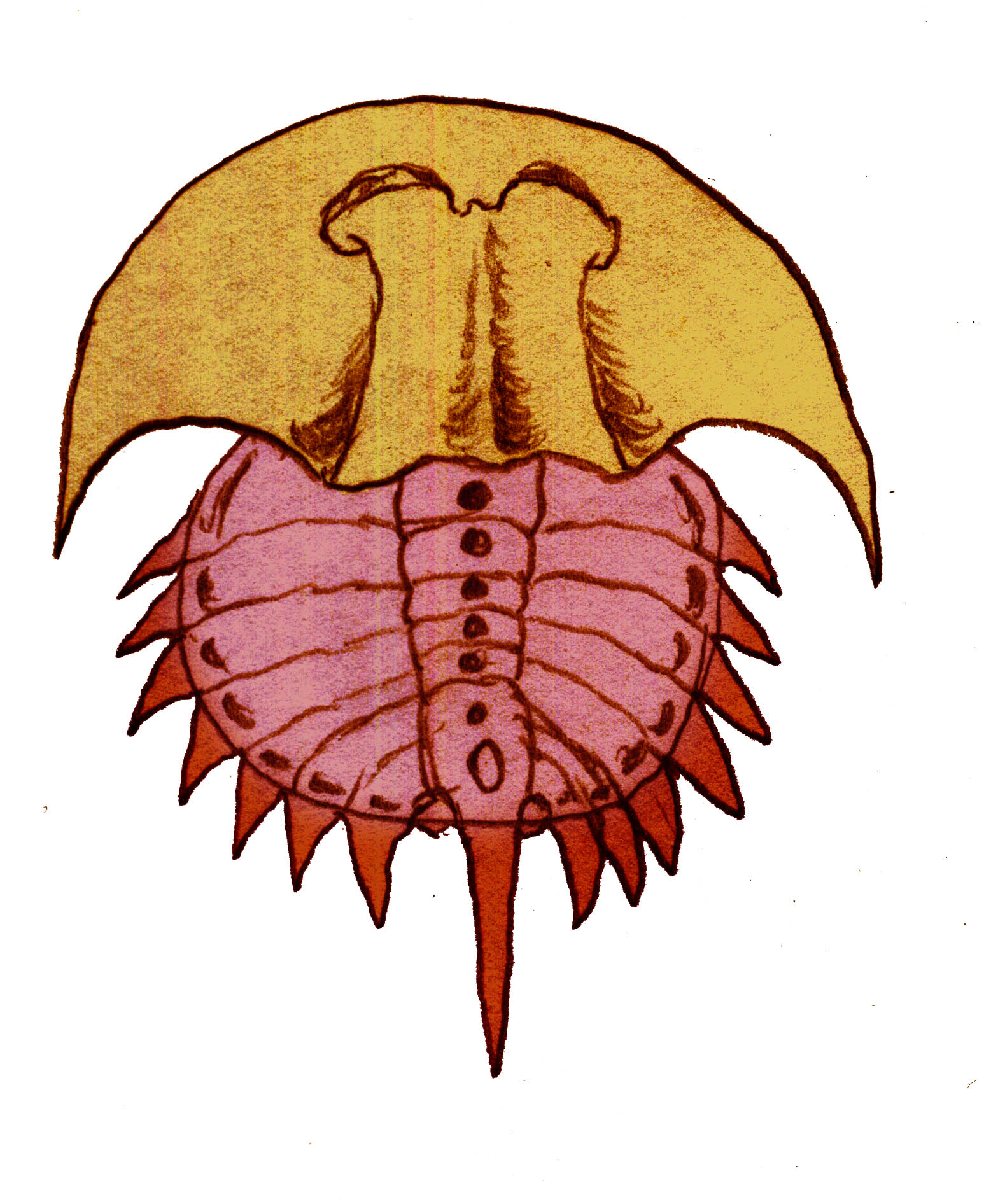
Euproops danae

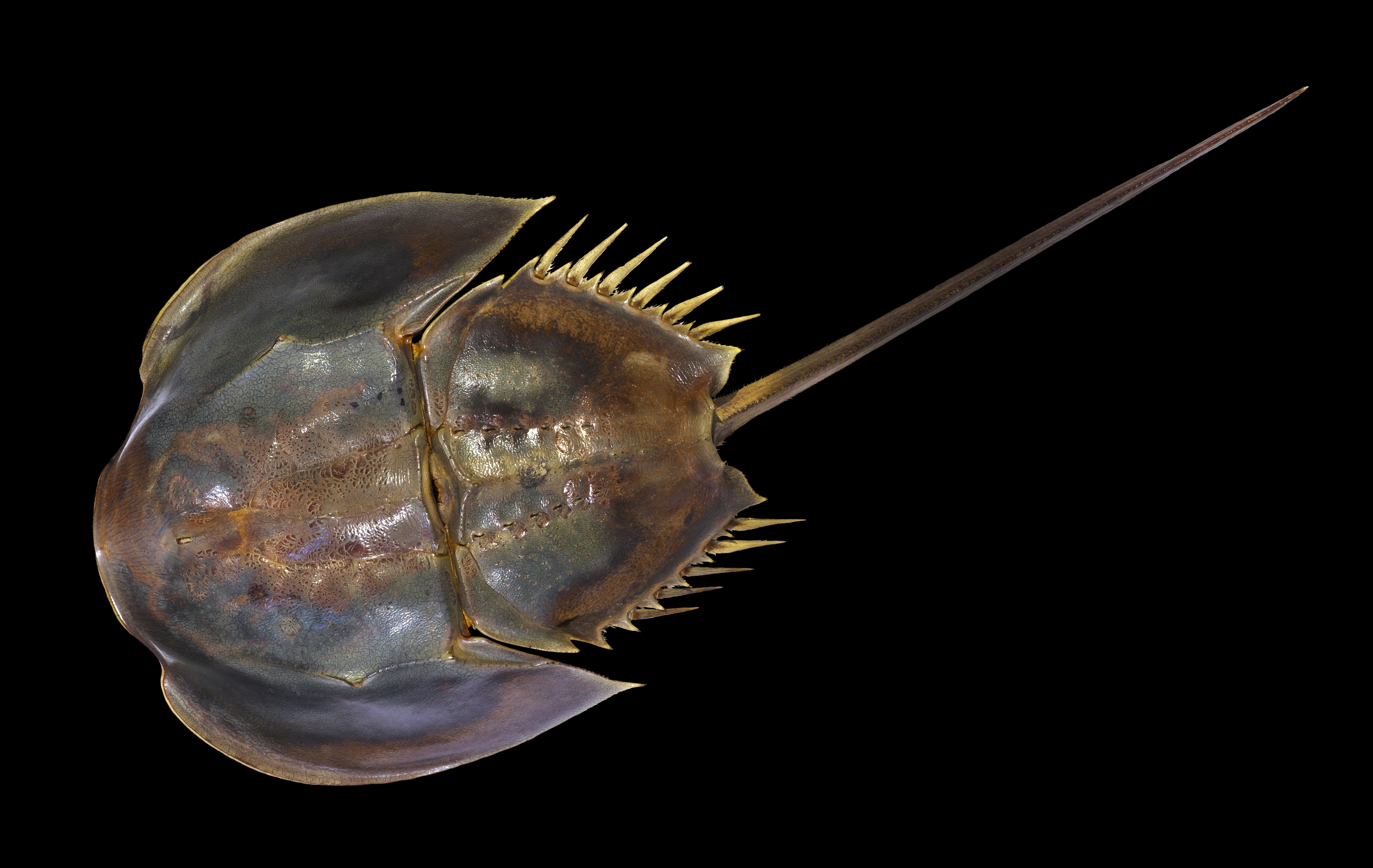
Limulus polyphemus

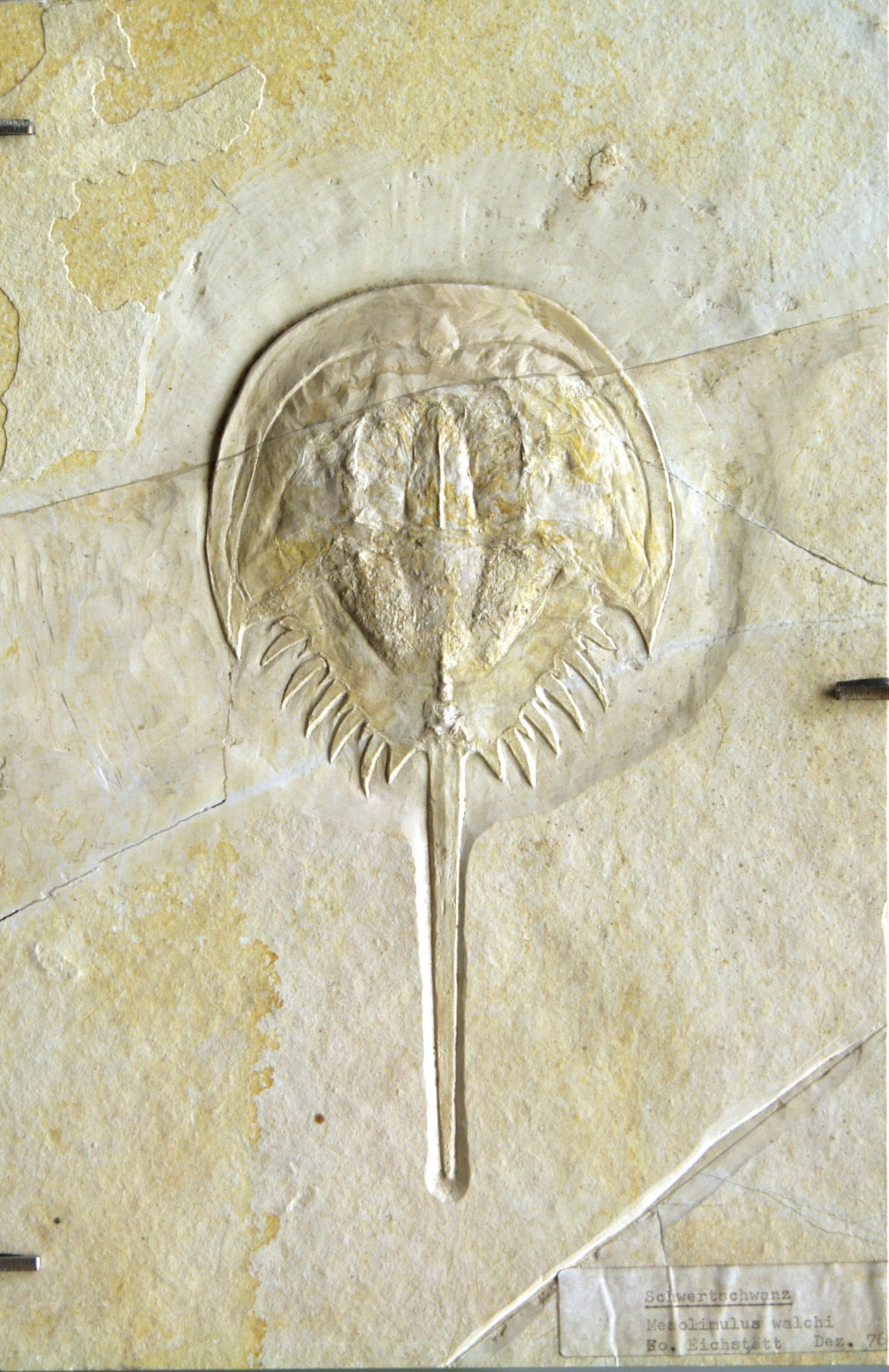
Mesolimulus walchi

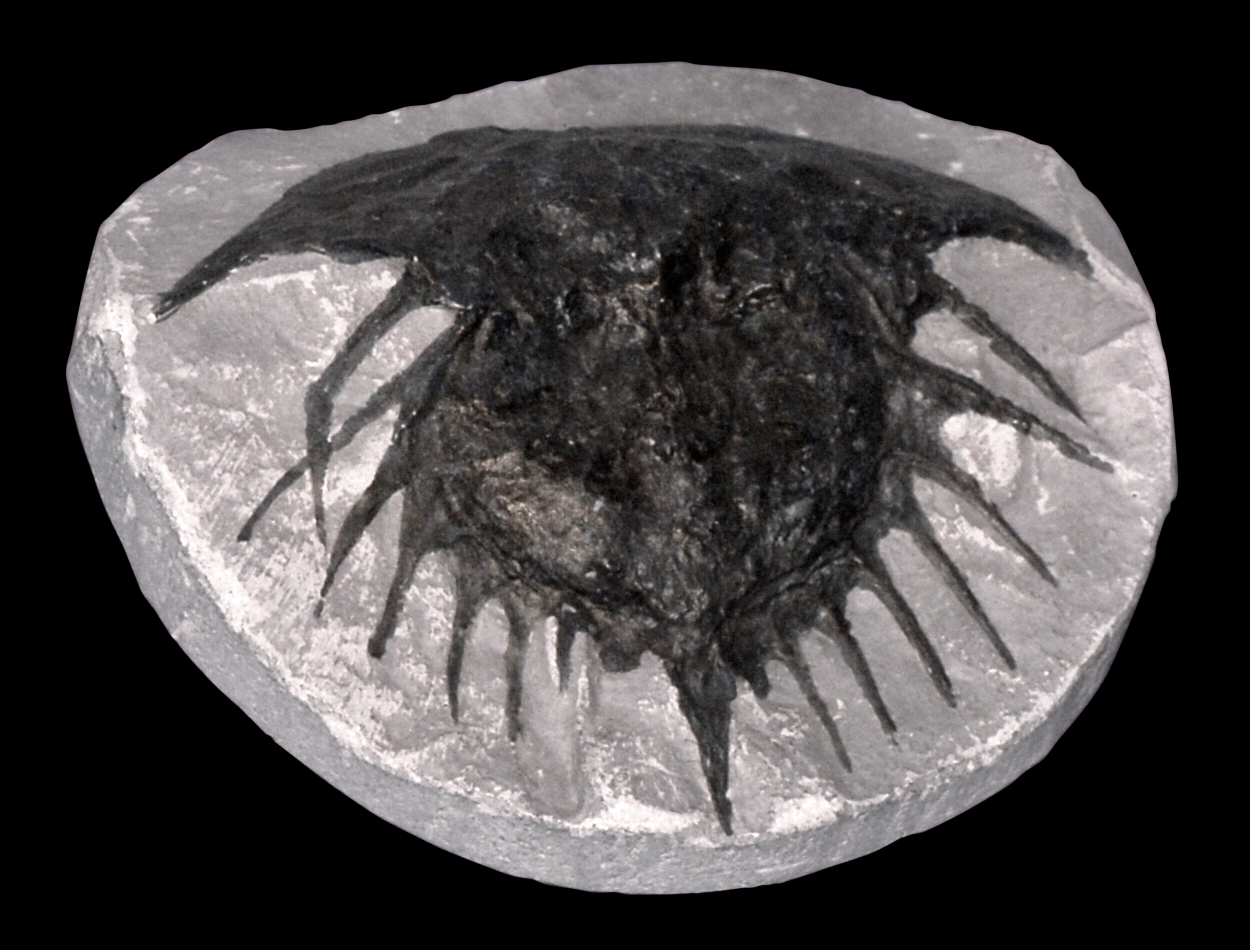
Prestwichia anthrax

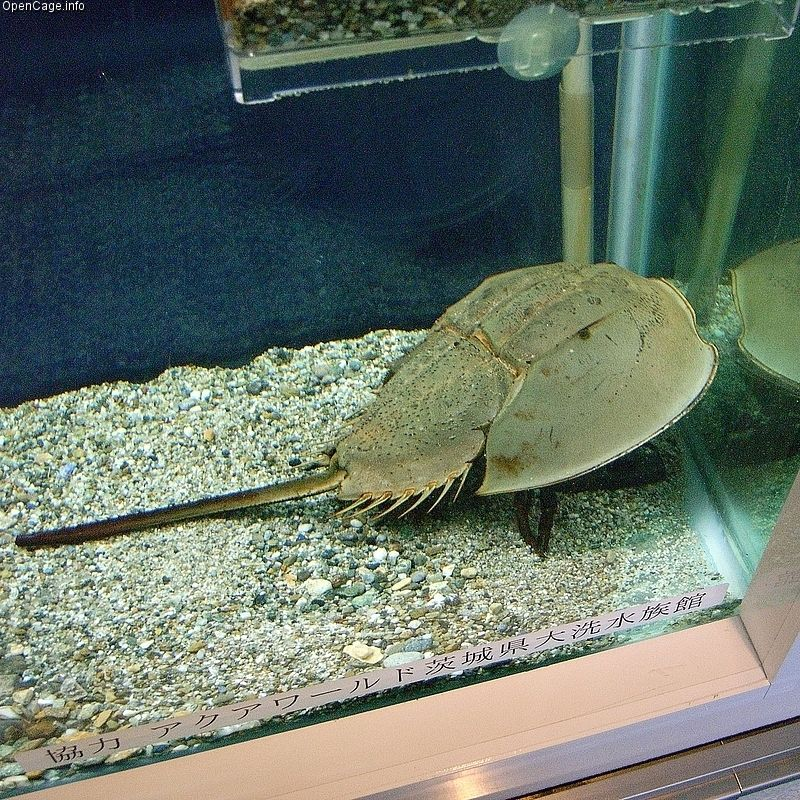
Tachypleus tridentatus

== Xiphosuran ichnogenera ==
Genus	Author(s)	Year	Status	Age	Location
†Kouphichnium	Nopcsa	1923	Valid	Carboniferous - Jurassic	Argentina; England; France; Germany; Mexico; Poland; United States
†Selenichnites	Romano & Whyte	1987	Valid	Cambrian – Jurrasic	N/A

== See also ==
- List of eurypterid genera
- List of trilobite genera
- List of ammonite genera
- List of prehistoric malacostracans
