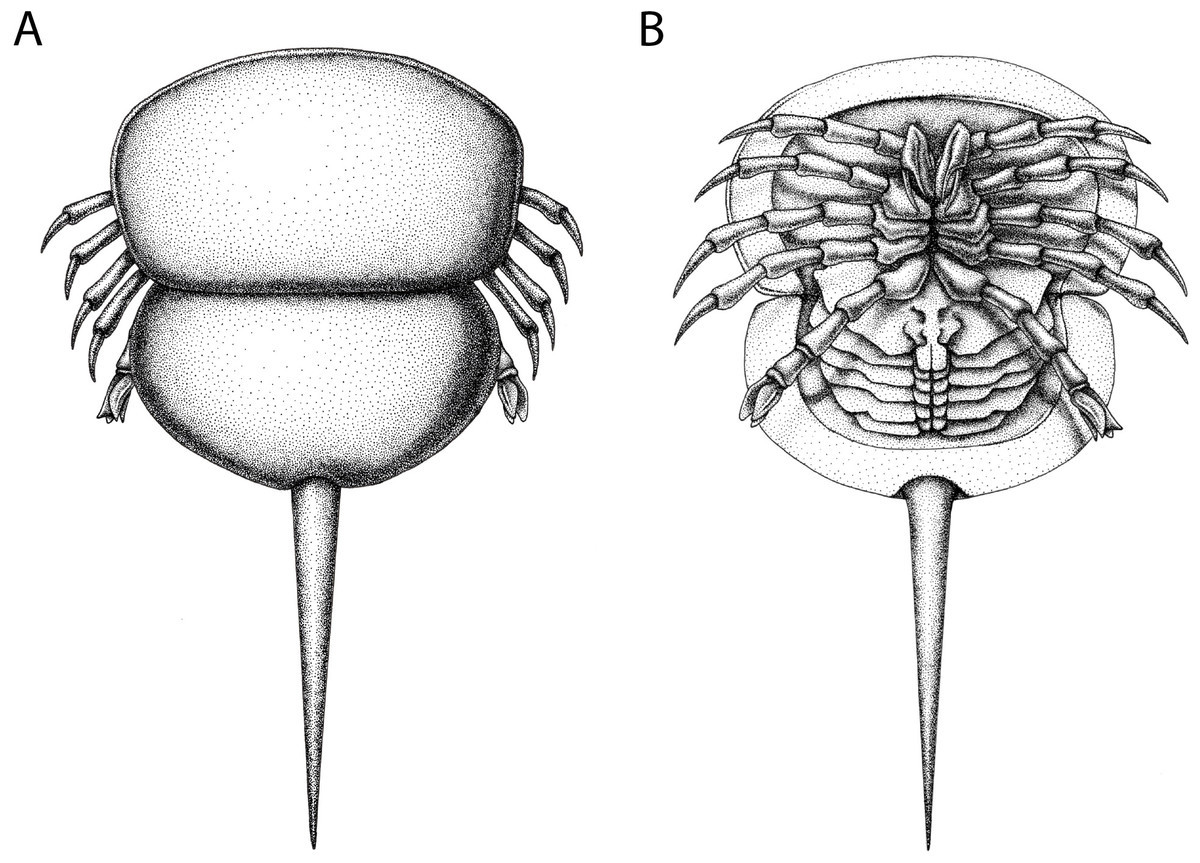
- Life restoration of P. woodwardi

Scientific classification
- Kingdom: Animalia
- Phylum: Arthropoda
- Subphylum: Chelicerata
- Order: Xiphosura
- Suborder: Xiphosurida
- Infraorder: †Belinurina
- Family: †Belinuridae
- Genus: †Prolimulus; Frič, 1899
- Species: †P. woodwardi

Binomial name
- †Prolimulus woodwardi Frič, 1899

= Prolimulus =

Prolimulus Temporal range: late Moscovian 307–308 Ma

Extinct monotypic genus of Carboniferous arthropods

Prolimulus is an extinct genus of arthropods belonging to the order Xiphosura and family Belinuridae. Fossils of this genus were discovered in the Czech Republic and date to the late Moscovian stage of the Carboniferous. The genus contains only one species: P. woodwardi.

== Discovery and history ==
Prolimulus woodwardi was first described by Antonín Frič in 1899. Multiple specimens were discovered in the Humboldt Mine, a now closed coal mine near Nýřany, Plzeň Region, Czech Republic. Prolimulus was formerly referred to as a Permian xiphosuran. However, the Nýřany Member of the Kladno Formation where the fossils were discovered is now accepted as dating from the late Moscovian to the early Kasimovian. More precisely, the fossils of Prolimulus were found in the lower part of the member, thus they date back to the late Moscovian, around 307 to 308 million years ago. The specific name honors Dr. Henry Woodward, a major figure for crustacean and arthropod paleontology.

== Description ==
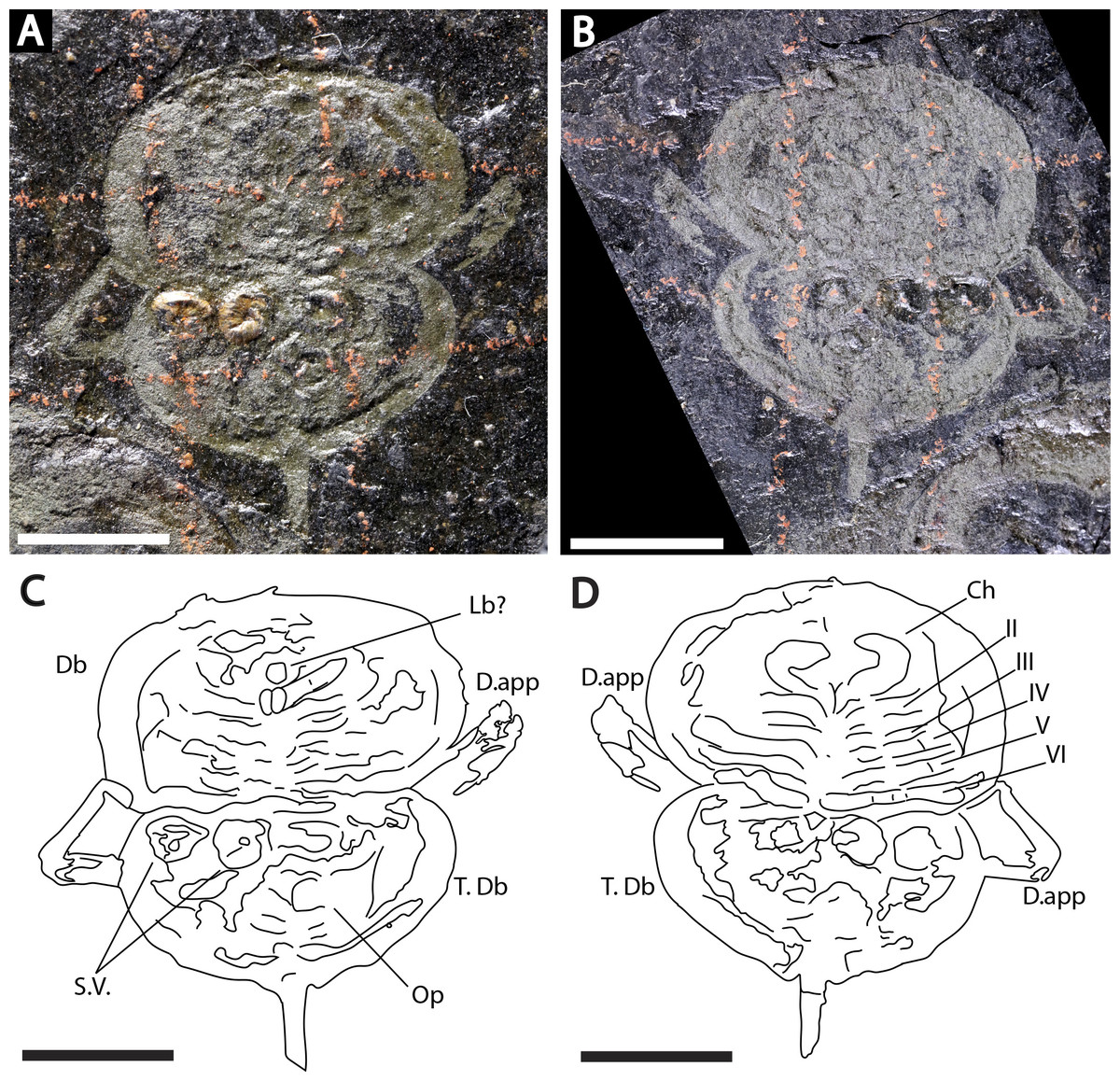
Holotype and interpretative drawings of Prolimulus woodwardi: part (A, C) and counterpart (B, D).

The holotype is approximately 27 mm long but the telson is fragmentary.

The prosoma is rounded, it is wider than it is long across all specimens. The width of the prosoma ranges from approximately 8.8 mm to 20 mm depending on the individuals while its length ranges from about 5.9 mm to 15 mm. The ventral doublure of the prosoma is often preserved and has a maximum width of 1.9 mm in the holotype. No traces of eyes, genal spines, lobes or ridges are observed on the prosoma. Possible traces of a labium are preserved in the holotype.

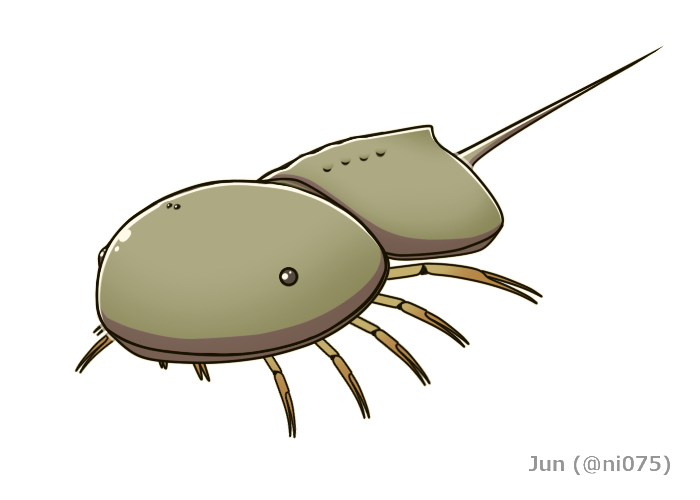
Alanops magnificus, a close relative of Prolimulus.

The thoracetron (fused segments posterior to the prosoma) is rounded and smaller than the prosoma. It ranges from approximately 7.7 mm to 18.5 mm in width and from approximately 5 mm to 12 mm in length depending on the specimens. No segmentation is observed. A thoracetronic doublure is often preserved, it is 2.1 mm wide in the holotype. No lateral spines are observed. Poorly preserved opercula are present in the holotype.

The telson is rarely entirely preserved. Complete telsons range from 13 mm to 15 mm in length, however, a specimen bears a partial telson that measures 17.1 mm, indicating a larger maximal length. The telson inserts in the thoracetron via a "U" shaped indentation. Contrary to similar belinurids such as Alanops, Prolimulus does not have any dorsal bulge on the thoracetron over the insertion point.

Few specimens preserve poorly preserved or disarticulated appendages beneath or around the prosoma. Prolimulus possesses six pairs of appendages: a pair of chelicerae followed by five pairs of legs.

== Classification ==
Simplified cladogram after Lustri et al. (2021).

- Xiphosura
  - †Kasibelinurus amicorum
  - - †Patesia randalli
    - †Lunataspis aurora
    - †Pickettia carteri
    - - - †Bellinuroopsis rossicus
        - - †Rolfeia fouldenensis
          - - †Paleolimulidae
              ⊞
              ⊟
              - †Xaniopyramis linseyi
              - †Palaeolimulus signatus
            - - †Valloisella lievinensis
              - - †Limulitella henkeli
                - †Austrolimulidae
                  ⊞
                  ⊟
                  - †Panduralimulus babcocki
                  - - - †Batracholimulus fuchsbergensis
                      - †Boeotiaspis longispinus
                    - - †Casterolimulus kletti
                      - †Dubbolimulus peetae
                      - - †Austrolimulus fletcheri
                        - †Psammolimulus gottingensis
                - Limulidae
      - †Belinuridae
        - - †Belinurus bellulus
          - †Belinurus trilobitoides
        - - - †Belinurus reginae
            - †Belinurus truemani
          - - †Anacontium brevis
            - †Anacontium carpenteri
          - - †Belinurus arcuatus
            - - †Belinurus lunatus
              - - †Euproops danae
                - - †Euproops sp.
                  - - †Euproops anthrax
                    - - †Euproops mariae
                      - †Euproops rotundatus
                    - - †Liomesaspis leonardensis
                      - †Liomesaspis laevis
                      - †Stilpnocephalus pontebbanus
                      - - †Alanops magnificus
                        - †Liomesaspis birtwelli
                        - †Prolimulus woodwardi

== Paleoecology ==
The Nýřany Member, where Prolimulus was discovered, consists of fluviolacustrine deposits in an alluvial plain. The palaeoenvironment comprised a braided river system with lakes, swamps and wetlands.

A cluster of Prolimulus has been described. Given the minimal physical disturbance of the environment, it is unlikely that this cluster was caused by post-mortem transport. It has been suggested that a moulting or mating event explains this cluster. Aggregative behaviours are well documented in modern horseshoe crabs. Parasitic serpulids of the species Spiroglyphus vorax are often found attached to the Prolimulus specimens.
