= Austrolimulus =

Austrolimulus Temporal range: Anisian
- Fossil specimen

Scientific classification
- Kingdom: Animalia
- Phylum: Arthropoda
- Subphylum: Chelicerata
- Order: Xiphosura
- Family: †Austrolimulidae
- Genus: †Austrolimulus; Riek, 1955
- Species: †A. fletcheri

Binomial name
- †Austrolimulus fletcheri Riek, 1955

Species of horseshoe crab relative

Austrolimulus fletcheri is an extinct xiphosuran, related to the modern horseshoe crab. The species is only known from the Middle Triassic-aged strata of Brookvale, New South Wales of Australia.

== Discovery and naming ==
Austrolimulus fletcheri is only known from one complete specimen. The specimen was discovered in the Beacon Hill Quarry near the suburb of Brookvale, Sydney, New South Wales of Australia. This quarry represents the Anisian Hawkesbury Sandstone. The fossil was discovered in an 8 m thick shale lens. The Hawkesbury Sandstone was formed in a coastal floodplain composed of high energy braided rivers, lakes and sand dunes. The shale lenses likely represent low-energy shallow water bodies disconnected from the main river channel. The generic name honors Harold Oswald Fletcher, a paleontologist of the Australian Museum.

== Description ==
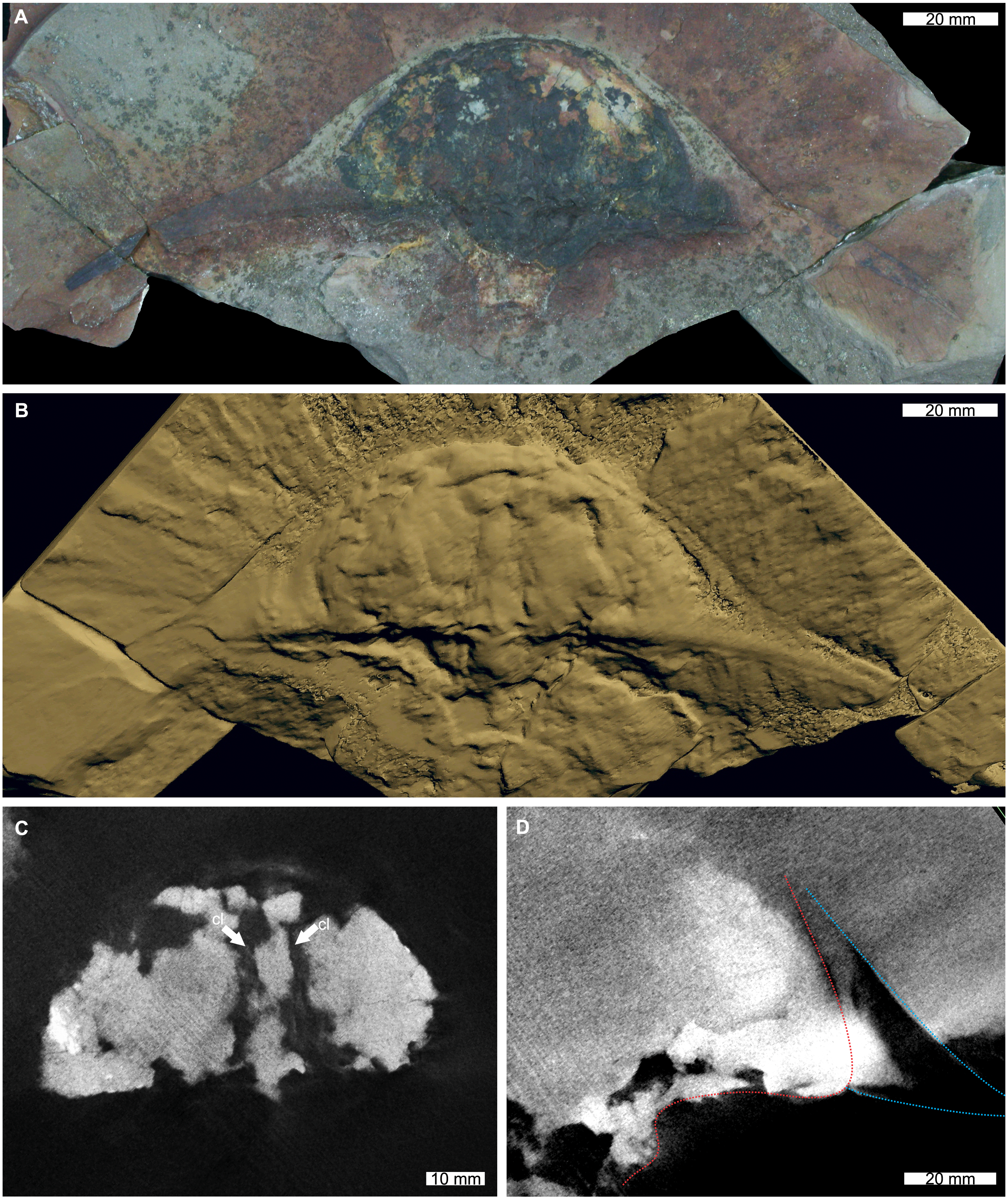
Fossil of Austrolimulus fletcheri

Austrolimulus fletcheri is 5.75 inches (14.6 cm) long.

The prosoma (head) is wider than the length of both the prosoma and opisthosoma combined, coming in at 7 inches (18 cm) in width, whilst the prosoma and opisthosoma combined only come in at 2.25 inches (5.7 cm) in length. The prosoma is divided into three main areas: a median narrow glabella-like region and two lateral cheek regions. The "cheeks" are themselves composed of two main regions separated by a carina: proximally, the finely tuberculate (covered with small bumps and irregular reliefs) "fixed cheeks" located adjacent to the glabella, and more distally, the "free cheeks". Possible spines extend from both sides of the carina above the inferred position of the eyes. The inner regions of the free cheeks are coarsely and irregularly tuberculate (covered with larger bumps and irregular reliefs), while the marginal regions are thinner, smooth and extend into very long genal spines.

The first three segments of the opisthosoma (abdomen) are consolidated whereas the following three segments are distinct. The three segments of the anterior region taper markedly posteriorly, the posterior segments are similar in width. At the front of the opisthosoma is a pair of well developed free lobes extending as far as the width of the posterior margin of the prosoma (excluding the genal spines). Last segment pointed postero-laterally. The central axis of the opisthosoma is similar in width to the "glabella" but tapers toward the rear. The telson (rear-facing spike) is longer than the body.

== Classification ==
Cladogram after Bicknell (2019).

- Xiphosura
  - †Kasibelinurus amicorum
  - - †Patesia randalli
    - - †Lunataspis aurora
      - - †Belinuridae
          ⊞
          ⊟
          - - †Belinurus trilobitoides
            - †Belinurus bellulus
          - - - †Anacontium carpenteri
              - †Anacontium brevis
            - - †Belinurus truemani
              - †Belinurus reginae
            - - †Belinurus arcuatus
              - - †Belinurus lunatus
                - - †Euproops danae
                  - - †Euproops sp.
                    - - †Euproops anthrax
                      - - †Euproops rotundatus
                        - †Euproops mariae
                      - - †Liomesaspis laevis
                        - †Liomesaspis leonardensis
                        - - †Pringlia birtwelli
                          - †Alanops magnificus
        - - †Bellinuroopsis rossicus
          - - †Rolfeia fouldenensis
            - - †Paleolimulidae
                ⊞
                ⊟
                - †Xaniopyramis linseyi
                - †Palaeolimulus signatus
              - - †Valloisella lievinensis
                - - †Limulitella henkeli
                  - Limulidae
                  - †Austrolimulidae
                    - †Tasmaniolimulus patersoni
                    - - †Panduralimulus babcocki
                      - - - †Batracholimulus fuchsbergensis
                          - †Boeotiaspis longispinus
                        - - †Dubbolimulus peetae
                          - †Casterolimulus kletti
                          - - †Psammolimulus gottingensis
                            - †Austrolimulus fletcheri
