= Belinuropsis =

Belinuropsis Temporal range: Carboniferous

Scientific classification
- Kingdom: Animalia
- Phylum: Arthropoda
- Subphylum: Chelicerata
- Order: Xiphosura
- Family: incertae sedis
- Genus: †Belinuropsis; Matthew, 1910

Type species
- †Belinuropsis wigudensis Matthew, 1910

Extinct genus of arthropods

Belinuropsis is a dubious genus of prehistoric arthropod which contains one species, B. wigudensis, from the Silurian period of New Brunswick, Canada. Matthew tried to describe Belinuropsis originally as a species of Belinurus. Two specimens that match the Matthew's illustration of B. wigudensis have been located in the New Brunswick Museum paleontology collection and assigned catalogue numbers NBMG 3307 and NBMG 3308 (Miller, 1988). Examination of the specimens casts doubt on validity of the genus erected by Matthew. The material is poorly preserved and difficult to interpret, so, after examinations of the specimens, Belinuropsis has been considered as nomen dubium.
