= Micrichnus =

Trace fossil classification
- Domain: Eukaryota
- Kingdom: Animalia
- Phylum: Arthropoda
- Subphylum: Chelicerata
- Order: Xiphosura
- Genus: †Micrichnus; Abel, 1926

Dinosaur footprint

Micrichnus is a trace fossil ichnogenus of arthropods. It was once thought to be a trace fossil made by a vertebrate.
