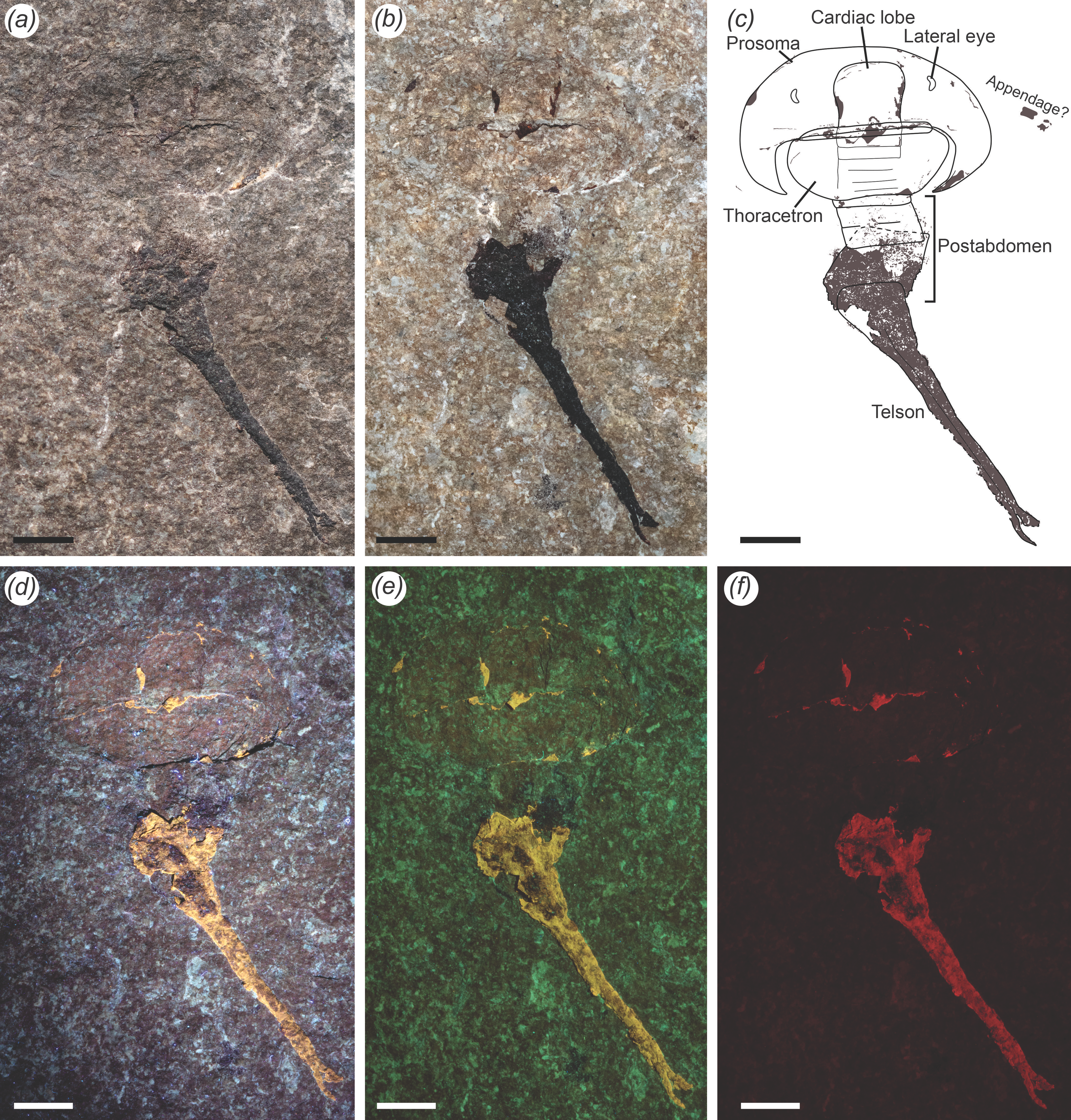
- Holotype and only known fossil of Ciurcalimulus

Scientific classification
- Kingdom: Animalia
- Phylum: Arthropoda
- Subphylum: Chelicerata
- Order: Xiphosura
- Genus: †Ciurcalimulus; Lamsdell, 2025

Type species
- †Ciurcalimulus discobolus Lamsdell, 2025

= Ciurcalimulus =

Ciurcalimulus Temporal range: Silurian (Ludlow), 424 Ma

Genus of primitive horseshoe crab

Ciurcalimulus is a genus of xiphosuran from the Silurian-aged Wabash Formation of Indiana, United States. It is one of the earliest known relatives of horseshoe crabs in the fossil record, informing understanding of their early diversification.

== Discovery and naming ==
In 1975, Samuel J. Ciurca discovered an arthropod specimen in the Kokomo Member of the Wabash Formation in Indiana, USA. These strata date to the Upper Ludlow age of the Silurian period, 424 million years ago, and are primarily known for its mass death assemblage of eurypterids. The specimen was catalogued in the Yale Peabody Museum as YPM IP 548961, and is an essentially complete but strongly compressed moult. It was named by James C. Lamsdell in 2025 as the new genus and species Ciurcalimulus discobolus, with the generic name referencing Ciurca and the specific name referencing Myron's Discobolus sculpture, due to the discus shape of the prosoma and thoracetron together.

== Description ==
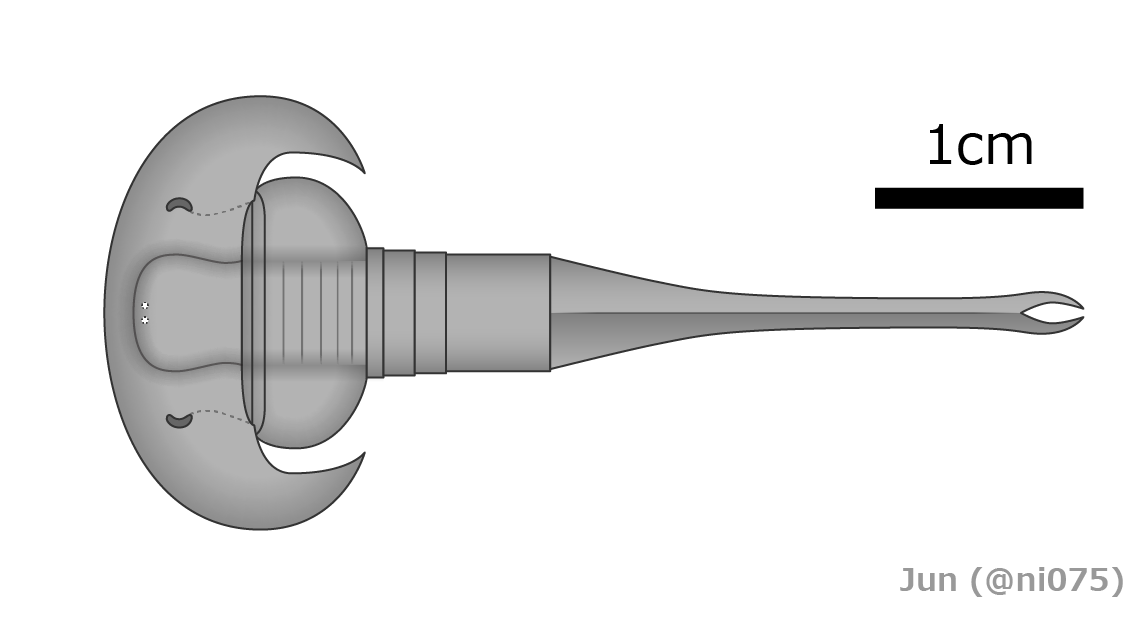
Diagram of Ciurcalimulus size and anatomy

Owing to its age and phylogenetic position, Ciurcalimulus is very primitive for a xiphosuran. It was very small, with the known specimen measuring 44.8 millimetres (1.76 in) in length. Anatomically speaking, unlike later species, it possesses a multisegmented postabdomen. This was one of four sections that early xiphosurans were split into: the prosoma (head), thoracetron (fused section of the opisthosoma), postabdomen (rear opisthosoma), and telson (rear-facing spike).

The prosoma is semicircular in shape, with large and curved spikes on either side extending to the back of the thoracetron. The two lateral eyes located on the sides of the prosoma, the more prominent of the four eyes in xiphosurans, are crescent shaped. A prominence on the center of the prosoma called the cardiac lobe is clear in the taxon, well defined by furrows and has a rounded front edge. Two short, freely articulating segments connect the prosoma to the thoracetron, which is also semicircular and similarly sized to the prosoma. Six fused segments making up this section can be observed alongside the midline of the animal, but are indistinguishable along the sides. The postabdomen has five segments which are freely moving and elongate in shape. The telson is as long as the entire body, and ends in a small bifurcation that is unique to the genus.

In general, the anatomy is indermediate between the earlier Ordovician genus Lunataspis and late Devonian genera such as Patesia and Picketta. The rounded prosoma lacking prominent eye ridges, absent thoracetron spikes, multisegmented postabdomen, and well as the lack of distinguished segments on the sides of the thoracetron are similar to Lunataspis and unlike the Devonian genera. But contrastingly, the prominent cardiac lobe is shared with the later species. It is also distinct from Lunataspis in lacking axial nodules (small protrusions along the midline of the thoracetron) and a prominent rim on the edge of the thoracetron.

== Classification ==
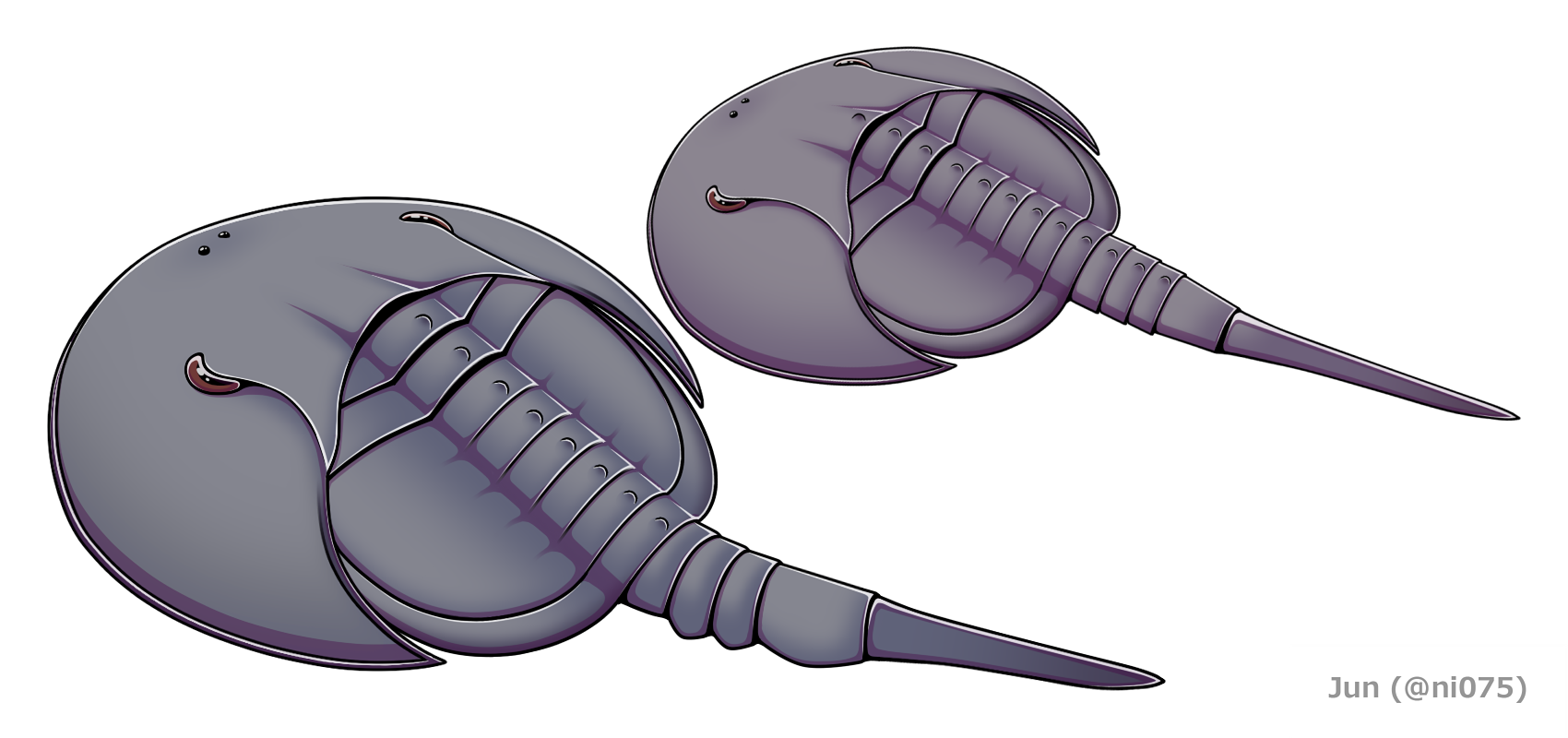
Life restoration of Lunataspis, a similar precursor to Ciurcalimulus

Ciurcalimulus belongs to the order Xiphosura, the group including modern horseshoe crabs and their extinct relatives. However, the multisegmented postabdomen and lack of ridges above the lateral eyes identifies it outside of the group Xiphosurida, which includes the vast majority of xiphosurans. As such, Circucalimulus is one of the most primitive members of Xiphosura. The prominent cardiac lobe is shared with xiphosurids, and Circucalimulus is thought to be the sister taxon of the group. The result of the phylogenetic analysis by Lamsdell in 2025 is seen below:

- Xiphosura
  - Lunataspis
  - - Ciurcalimulus
    - Xiphosurida
      - Kasebelinuridae
      - - Belinurina
        - - Bellinuroopsis
          - - Rolfeia
            - - Paleolimulidae
              - - Valloisella
                - - Austrolimulidae
                  - Limulidae

The recovery of Ciurcalimulus in an intermediate position between Lunataspis and all other xiphosurans helped clarify the ancestral anatomy of the group, distinguished genuine primitive traits from distinctive aspects of Lunataspis. Features such as the semicircular thoracetron shape, lack of thoracetron spikes, possession of two segments between the prosoma and thoracetron, and multisegmented abdomen are shared by the genera, and would have been present in the earliest xiphosurans. Contrastingly, the well defined thoracetron rim of Lunataspis is not seen in Ciurcalimulus and was a unique feature of the former genus. Both genera possess thirteen segments, counting each segmented fused into the thoracetron, and this number may be ancestral to all crown euchelicerates (a group including xiphosurans, arachnids, and eurypterids). Such a primitive taxon being present in the Silurian age is significant, as it indicates that the Late Ordovician mass extinction did not have a significant impact on xiphosuran evolution, with xiphosurids appearing in the later Silurian or Devonian rather than the Ordovician.
