= Kasibelinuridae =

Scientific classification
- Domain: Eukaryota
- Kingdom: Animalia
- Phylum: Arthropoda
- Subphylum: Chelicerata
- Order: Xiphosura
- Family: †Kasibelinuridae; Pickett, 1993

Genera
- See text.

Synonyms
- Elleriidae Raymond, 1944

Extinct family of horseshoe crabs

Kasibelinuridae is a family of extinct xiphosurans (horseshoe crabs). As of November 2024, two genera are accepted by the Paleobiology Database:

- Kasibelinurus Pickett, 1993
- Pickettia Bicknell et al., 2019
