= Elleria =

Scientific classification
- Kingdom: Animalia
- Phylum: Arthropoda
- Subphylum: Chelicerata
- Order: Xiphosura
- Family: †Elleriidae
- Genus: †Elleria; Raymond, 1944
- Species: †E. morani

Binomial name
- †Elleria morani (Eller, 1938)

Genus of extinct arthropod

Elleria is an extinct genus of arthropods of the monotypic family Elleriidae. Only one species is assigned to this genus, Elleria morani. While originally considered a Xiphosuran, was later argued to be of a Trilobite.
