= Archeolimulus =

Archeolimulus Temporal range: Middle Ordovician

Scientific classification
- Kingdom: Animalia
- Clade: Panarthropoda
- Phylum: Arthropoda
- Order: †Bradoriida; Chlupáč, 1963
- Genus: †Archeolimulus; Chlupáč, 1963
- Species: †A. hanusi

Binomial name
- †Archeolimulus hanusi Chlupáč, 1963

Species of horseshoe crab relative

Archeolimulus is a prehistoric arthropod that was described from the Czech Republic in rocks of Middle Ordovician age. Although it was described as xiphosuran, related to the modern horseshoe crab, it is later considered as bradoriid instead.
