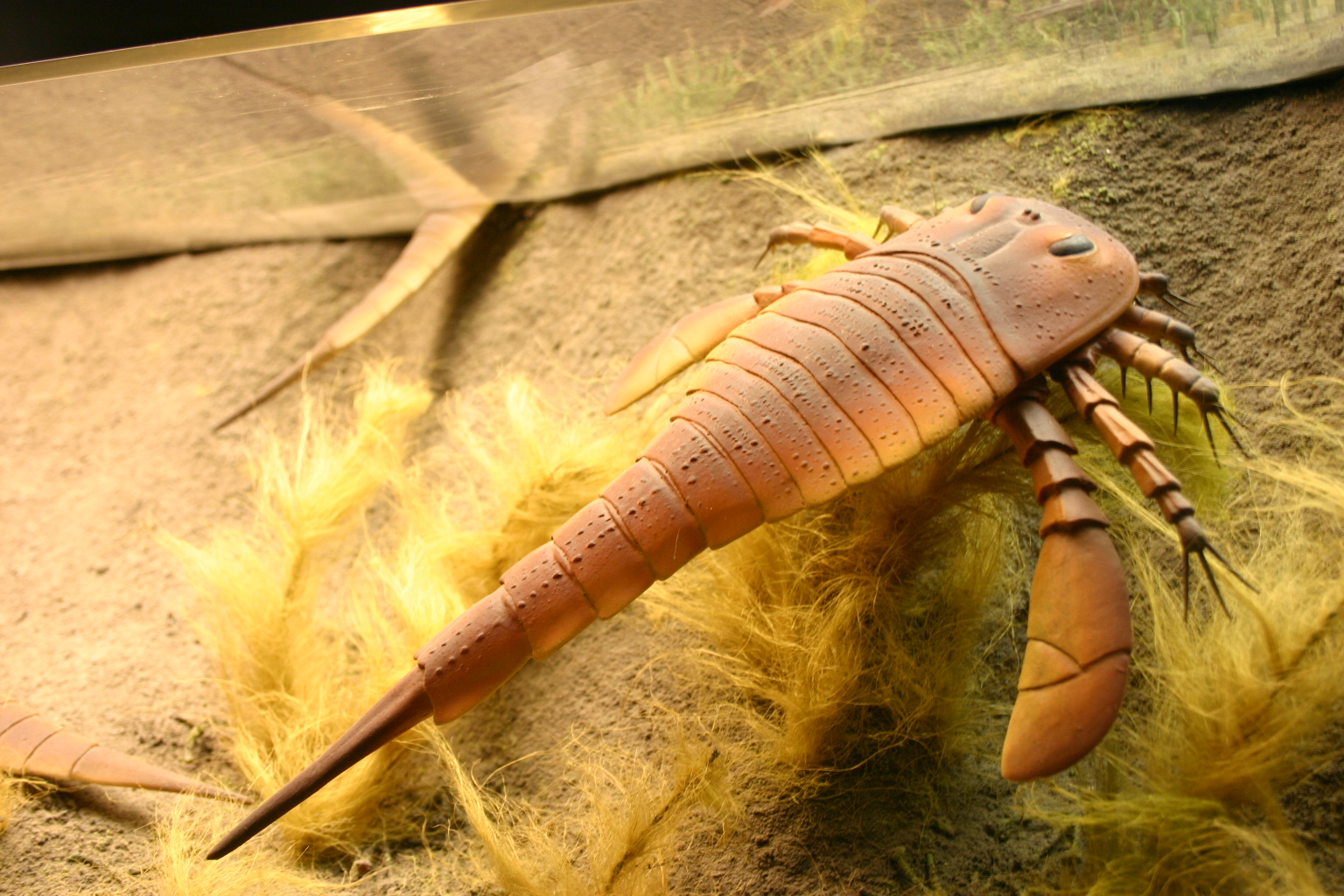
- Reconstruction of Eurypterus (Eurypterida)
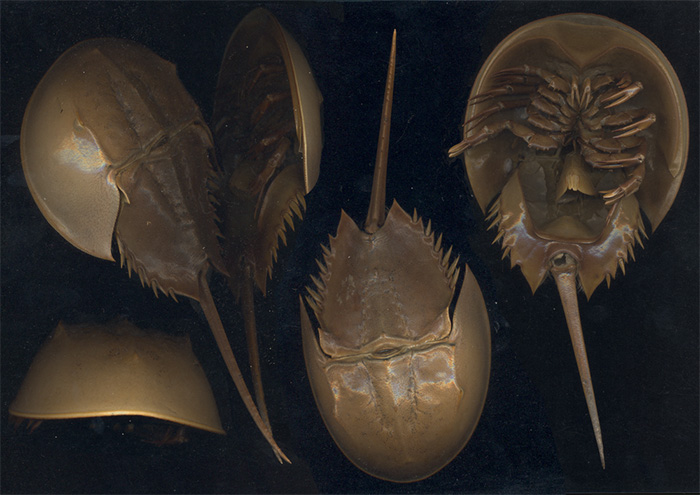
- Five views of Limulus polyphemus (Xiphosura)

Scientific classification
- Kingdom: Animalia
- Phylum: Arthropoda
- Subphylum: Chelicerata
- Class: Merostomata; Woodward, 1866

Orders
- †Eurypterida; Xiphosura

= Merostomata =

Merostomata Temporal range: Darriwilian–Recent

Class of arthropods

Merostomata is a class of chelicerate arthropods that contains the extinct Eurypterida (sea scorpions) and the extant Xiphosura (horseshoe crabs). The term was originally used by James Dwight Dana to refer to Xiphosura only, but was emended by Henry Woodward to cover both groups.

== Etymology ==
The name "Merostomata" derives from the Greek roots μηρός (meros, "thigh") and στόμα (stoma, "mouth"), in reference to the animals' possession of appendages which are mouthparts at their proximal end, but swimming legs at their distal end.

== History ==
The scientific consensus at the beginning of the 20th century was that these two marine groups were closely related, and only more distantly related to the terrestrial Arachnida. Some more recent analyses suggest the grouping Merostomata is not monophyletic, with Xiphosura being basal to a clade comprising Eurypterida and Arachnida. Other recent analyses support the monophyly of this group. The Xiphosura are estimated to have diverged from the Arachnida 480 million years ago.

The shared features of the two groups traditionally grouped in the Merostomata are now thought to be retentions of primitive conditions (symplesiomorphies), thus the name Merostomata has been recommended to be abandoned.

However, a 2022 analysis recovered the monophyly of Merostomata, as opposed to a monophyletic Arachnida, with Xiphosura as the only modern representative in a derived position, indicating the convergence of several characteristics that supposedly united the arachnids.
