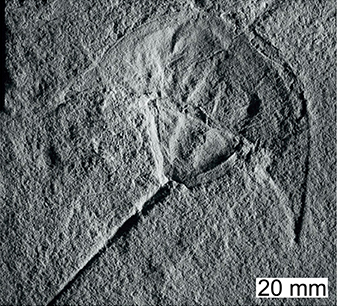
- Holotype specimen

Scientific classification
- Kingdom: Animalia
- Phylum: Arthropoda
- Subphylum: Chelicerata
- Order: Xiphosura
- Family: †Austrolimulidae
- Genus: †Vaderlimulus; Lerner et al. 2017
- Species: †V. tricki

Binomial name
- †Vaderlimulus tricki Lerner et al. 2017

= Vaderlimulus =

Extinct genus of horseshoe crabs

Vaderlimulus is a genus of horseshoe crab. The species V. tricki lived in the Olenekian age Triassic period approximately 245 million years ago North America, Idaho. The genus was named after the Star Wars character Darth Vader due to the animal's oversized head shield resembling Darth Vader’s helmet. The specific epithet "tricki" named in recognition of Trick Runions who discovered V. tricki. Vaderlimulus tricki is known as the first Triassic horseshoe crab from North America. Vaderlimulus was 10 centimeters (4 inches) in length.

It was a member of the family Austrolimulidae, meaning that Vaderlimulus tricki lived in the oceans of the Triassic Period but may had wandered into freshwater too. V. tricki most likely inhabited the coast lines of western North America, Idaho where both salt water and freshwater meet.
