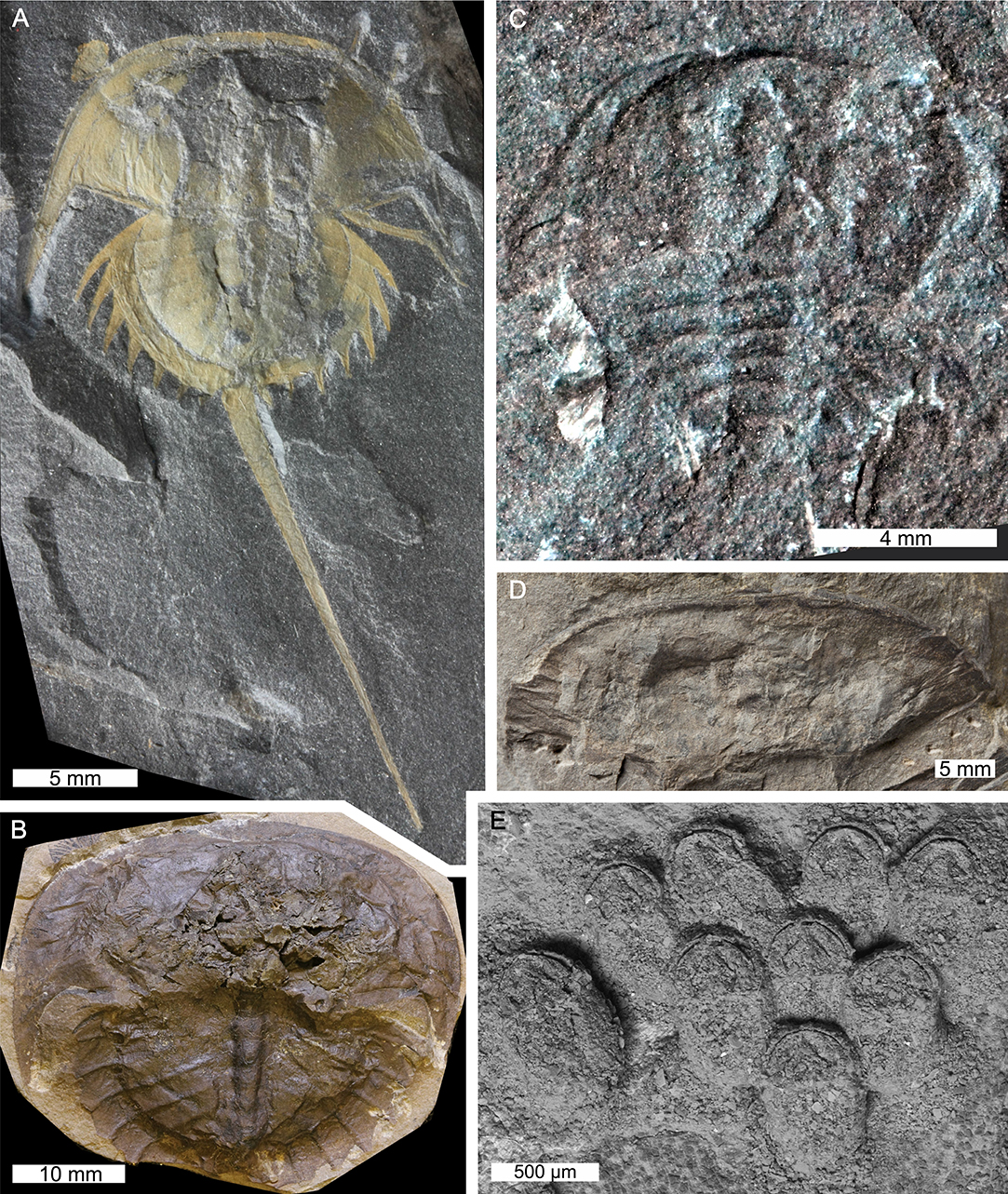
- Various species of Euproops
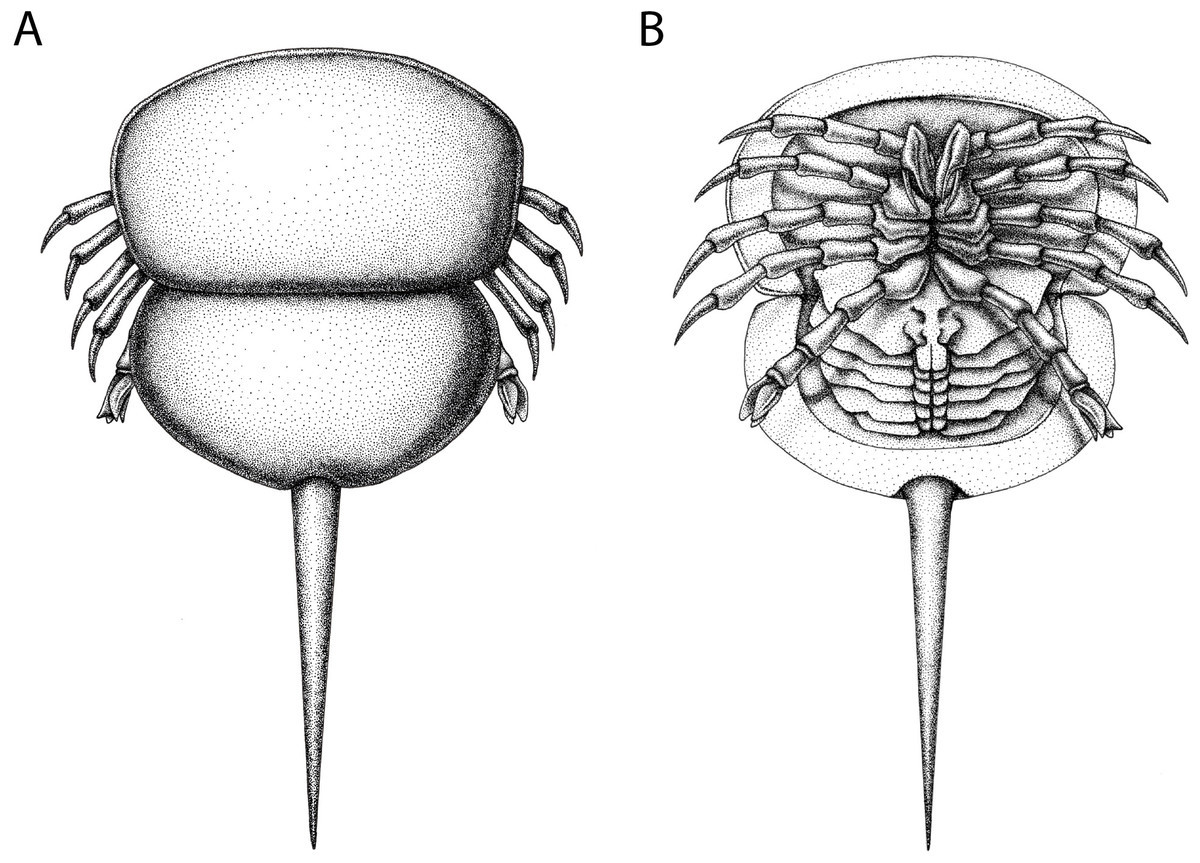
- Life restoration of Prolimulus, a paedomorphic belinurid

Scientific classification
- Kingdom: Animalia
- Phylum: Arthropoda
- Subphylum: Chelicerata
- Order: Xiphosura
- Suborder: Xiphosurida
- Infraorder: †Belinurina; Zittel & Eastman, 1913
- Family: †Belinuridae; Zittel & Eastman, 1913

Genera
- Alanops Racheboeuf et al., 2002; Anacontium Raymond, 1944; Andersoniella Lamsdell, 2020; Belinurus Bronn, 1839; Euproops Meek, 1867; Liomesaspis Raymond, 1944; Prestwichianella Woodward, 1876; Pringlia Raymond, 1944; Prolimulus Frič, 1899; Stilpnocephalus Selden, Simonetto & Marsiglio, 2019

Synonyms
- Euproopidae Eller, 1938; Liomesaspididae Raymond, 1944; Bellinuridae (lapsus calami)

= Belinuridae =

Belinuridae Temporal range: Late Devonian-Early Permian Famennian–Kungurian

Extinct family of arthropods

Belinuridae is an extinct family of arthropods belonging to the order Xiphosura, known from the latest Devonian, Carboniferous and Early Permian. They are placed as the only members of the infraorder Belinurina (also spelled Bellinurina). They were one of the most successful and diverse groups of xiphosurans in their evolutionary history, having managed to colonise and diversify within freshwater environments particularly during the Carboniferous period.

== Description ==
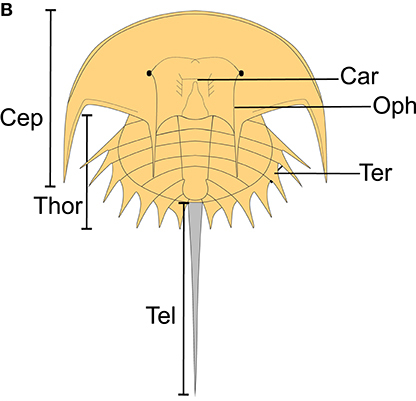
Diagram of Euproops showing morphological features of belinurids. Key: Cep: cephalothorax; Oph: ophthalmic ridge; Tel: telson; Ter: tergite; Thor: thoracetron (a fused solid plate making up the posterior half of the body)

Belinurids are among the most morphologically diverse members of Xiphosura, exhibiting great diversity in body form across the group.

The cephalothorax (the large front section of the carapace bearing the eyes) of belinurids are prominently domed, with the outer edges of the cephalothorax being flattened. The genal spines (the spines projecting from the outer posterior corners of the cephalothorax) are either flat, project backwards, or even vestigial in some forms. The ophthalmic ridges (the ridges associated with the compound eye on the upper surface of the cephalothorax), curve posteriorly relative to the position of the eyes. The thoracetron (a fused plate making up the back half of the body in advanced xiphosurans) varies from triangular, to round to trapezoidal, which in Euproops and Belinurus are made up of 5-7 segments (tergites), though in some belinurid genera there are no visible segments/tergites on the thoracetron. The telson (the posterior-most part of the body) is narrow and elongate in all known belinurids.

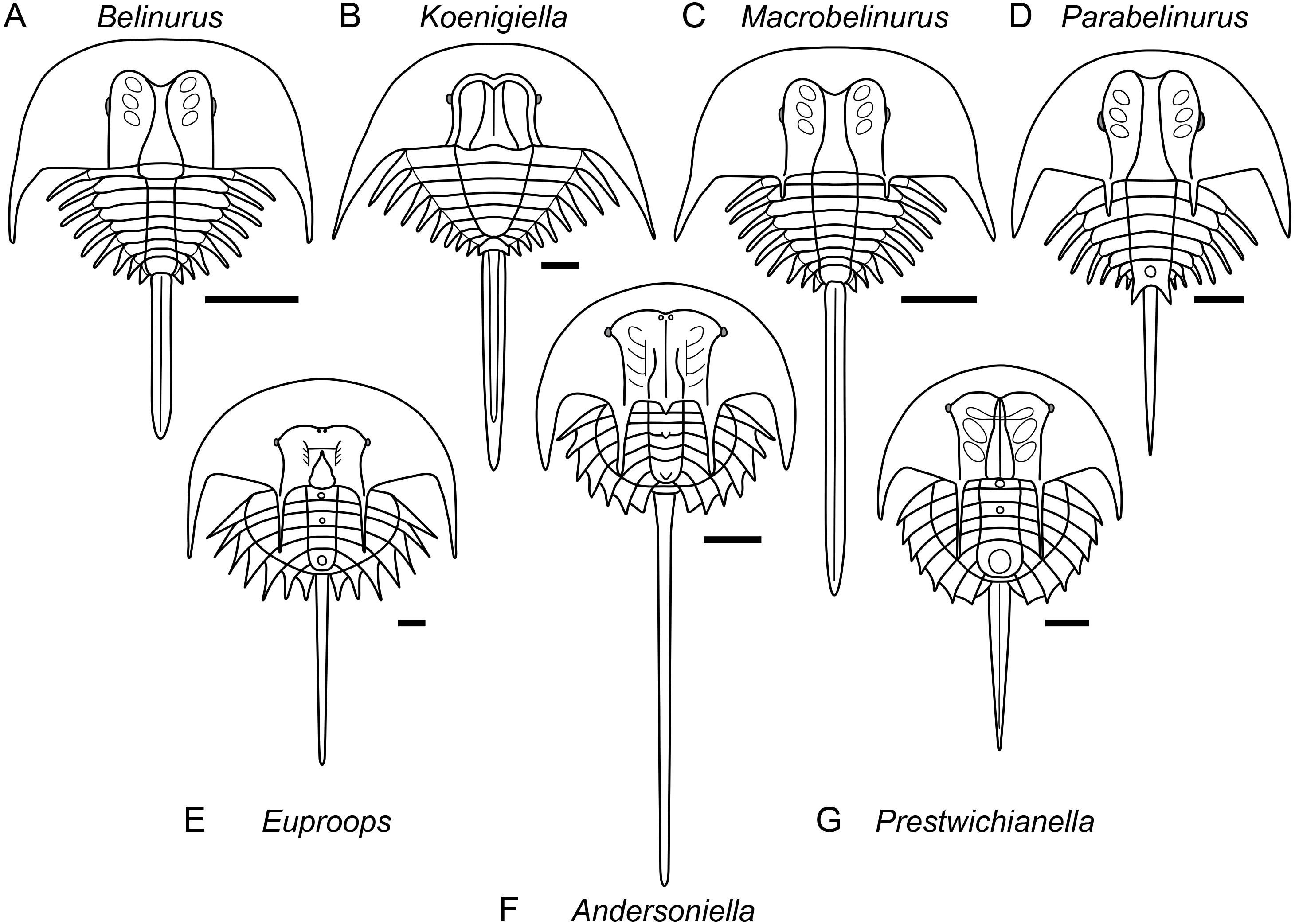
Comparison of the carapace morphology of non-paedomorphic belinurid genera.

Some belinurids exhibit a paedomorphic morphology resembling that of juvenile xiphosurans, with a reduced body size and reduced or absent genal spines, with a number of paedomorphic genera exhibiting a roughly equally sized cephalothorax and thoracetron.

Limbs including chelicerae are known from a number of belinurids, indicating that the limbs of the cephalothorax were arranged similarly to those of modern horseshoe crabs. The central nervous system in an exceptionally preserved specimen of Euproops is very similar to that of living horseshoe crabs and other chelicerates.

== Ecology ==
Unlike living horseshoe crabs, many belinurids are thought to have primarily lived in freshwater. A number of authors have argued that some belinurids may have been adapted to semi-terrestrial living, more-so than living horseshoe crabs, though the evidence in support of such a hypothesis has been questioned. At least some belinurids only exhibited subtle morphological change during growth.

== Taxonomy ==
As of 2020, Belinuridae has 7 genera and 37 species. However it is widely agreed that the family is currently oversplit, and that a number of currently recognised species are likely synonyms of other named species.
