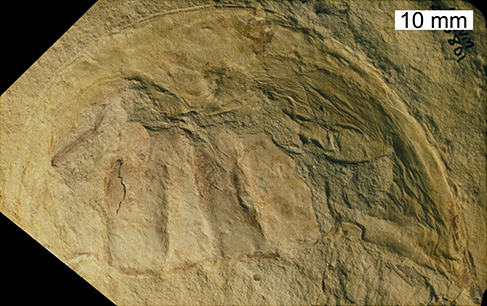
- Casterolimulus kletti from the Fox Hills Formation

Scientific classification
- Kingdom: Animalia
- Phylum: Arthropoda
- Subphylum: Chelicerata
- Order: Xiphosura
- Genus: †Casterolimulus; Holland, Erickson & O'Brien, 1975
- Species: †C. kletti

Binomial name
- †Casterolimulus kletti Holland, Erickson & O'Brien, 1975

= Casterolimulus =

Casterolimulus Temporal range: Late Cretaceous

Genus of horseshoe crab relatives

Casterolimulus is an extinct genus of xiphosuran. It is known from the Late Cretaceous Fox Hills Formation of North America, and is believed to have lived in freshwater environments. It belongs to the family Limulidae, and is considered a close relative of Victalimulus, which is from the Early Cretaceous of Australia.
