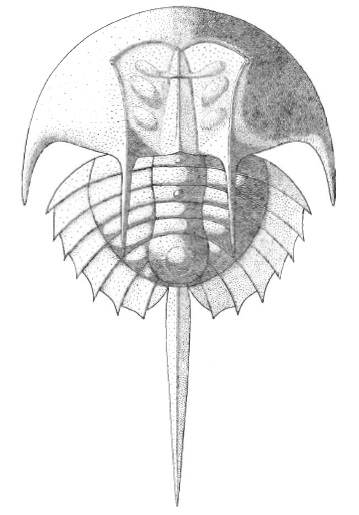
- Reconstruction by Filipiak, P. & Krawczyński, W. 1996 of Euproops rotundatus (Prestwich, 1840) in dorsal view.

Scientific classification
- Kingdom: Animalia
- Phylum: Arthropoda
- Subphylum: Chelicerata
- Order: Xiphosura
- Family: †Belinuridae
- Genus: †Euproops; Meek, 1867

Synonyms
- Prestwichia Woodward, 1867; Prestwichianella Cockerell, 1905

= Euproops =

Euproops Temporal range: Carboniferous

Genus of horseshoe crab relatives

Euproops is an extinct genus of xiphosuran, related to the modern horseshoe crab. It lived during the Carboniferous Period.

The Treatise on Invertebrate Paleontology describes Euproopidae as "small forms with wedge-shaped cardiac lobe bordered by distinct axial furrows, abdominal shield with annulated axis bearing a high boss on last segment." The same source describes Euproops as follows. "Prosoma with flat genal spines and carinate opthamalic spines; cardiopthamalic region with or without intercardiopthamalic area; abdomen with raised pleural ridges that cross flattened rim and are prolonged as marginal spines; annulated axis with knob on 1st and 3rd segments and elevated boss or short spine on hindmost segment; telson long."

Unusually, Euproops may have been semiaquatic, due to being found in terrestrial substrates more often than aquatic ones, as well as the genal and ophthalmic spines of E. danae closely resembling lycopod twigs, alongside E. rotundatus resembling the arachnid Maiocercus.

== Type species ==
Belinurus danae Meek & Worthen, 1865. = Euproops kilmersdonensis Ambrose & Romano, 1972 according to Anderson (1994); also E. gwenti and E. graigola, both from Upper Coal Measures strata in Wales, and E. darrahi from the Pennsylvanian Conemaugh Formation, Pennsylvania, USA according to Bicknell and Pates (2020).

E. danae is widely distributed, having also been recorded from the Mazon Creek Konservat-Lagerstätte, Carbondale Formation, Illinois, USA; the Beeman Formation, New Mexico, USA; Uffington Shale of West Virginia, USA; Riversdale Group, Canada; the Almaznaya Formation and Donets Black Coal Basin, Ukraine; Farrington Group, England, UK; Smolyaninovskaya Formation, Russia.

In 2021, a specimen of E. danae was discovered with an exceptionally well-preserved brain and central nervous system (CNS). It appears that the CNS of this (and perhaps other extinct horseshoe crabs) has remained essentially unchanged for some 300 m.y.

=== Other species ===
- Euproops mariae Crônier & Courville, 2004. from the Upper Carboniferous of the Graissessac Basin (Massif Central, France).
- Euproops rotundatus (Prestwich 1840). From the Upper Carboniferous of Coalbrookdale, Shropshire, England. Also recorded from Coal Measures at Westhoughton, England, UK; Upper Coal Measures in South Wales, UK; and Pennine Middle Coal Measures in Lancashire, England. The fine reconstruction of E. rotundatus by Filipiak and Krawczyński (1996) is based on material from the Orzesze Beds, Upper Silesian Coal Basin of Sosnowiec, Poland.
- Euproops anthrax Prestwich, 1840, Pennant Sandstone Formation (Upper Coal measures), Wales.
- Euproops longispina Packard, 1885, from the Carboniferous-aged Allegheny Formation, Pennsylvania, USA.
- Euproops cambrensis Dix and Pringle, 1929, from the Lower Coal Measures (Silesian, Westphalian) 15 yards above New Seam (= Gellideg Seam), Glamorgan, South Wales.
- Euproops meeki Dix and Pringle, 1929, From the Carboniferous Upper Coal Measures of South Wales, UK.
- Euproops bifidus Siegfried, 1972, Flöz Dreibänke Formation, Upper Westphalian, Osnabrück, Lower Saxony, Germany.
- Euproops orientalis Kobayashi, 1933, from the Carboniferous-aged Jido Series, Korea.
- Euproops sp., so-called Piesproops, from the Carboniferous Osnabrück Formation, Piesberg quarry, Westphalian D, Osnabrück, Lower Saxony, Germany.

== Gallery ==
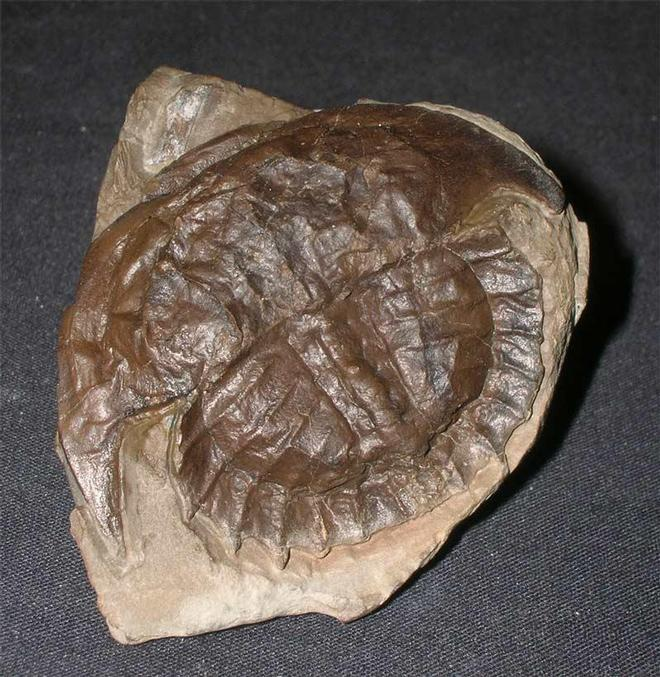
Euproops rotundatus (Prestwich 1840). Upper Carboniferous, Westphalian (Duckmantian), Crock Hay Open Cast Quarry, Wigan, Lancashire, UK.

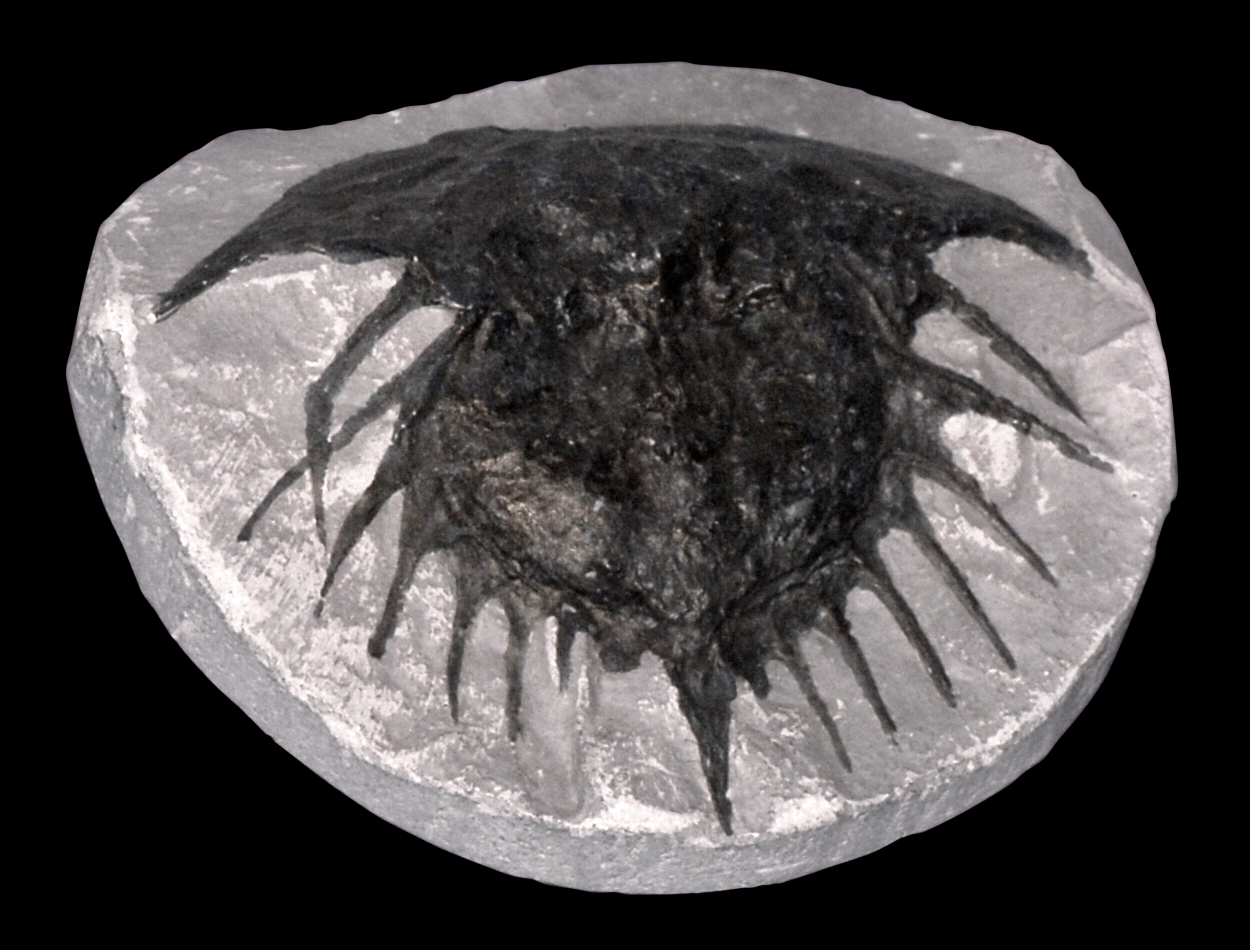
Fossil of E. 'Prestwichia' anthrax from Coalbrook Dale, England.

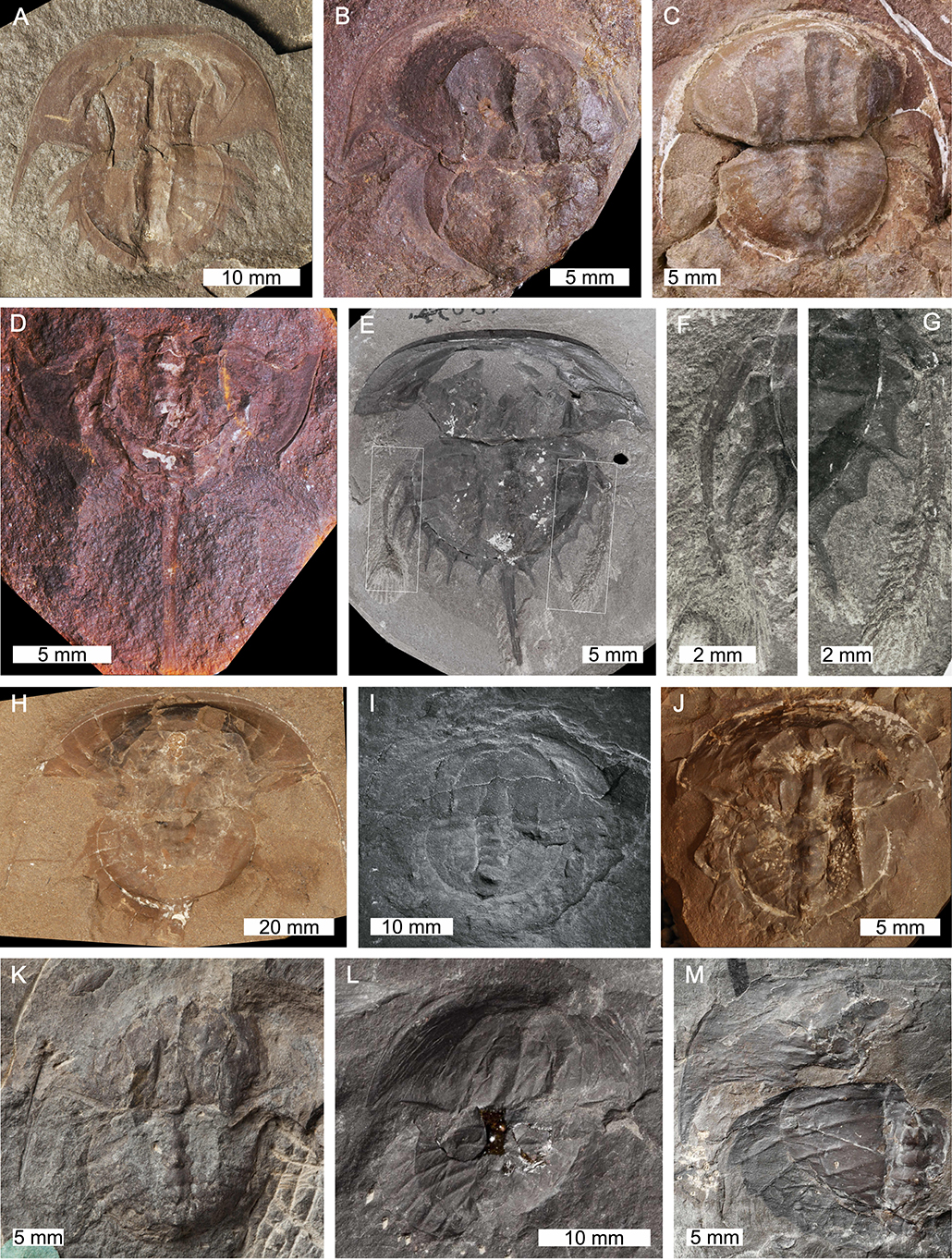
Fossils of Euproops danae.

== Sources ==
- Fossils (Smithsonian Handbooks) by David Ward
- Leif Størmer, 1955, Merestomata, Treatise on Invertebrate Paleontology, Part P Arthropoda 2, Chelicerata, Geological Society of America and the University of Kansas, p. P20.
