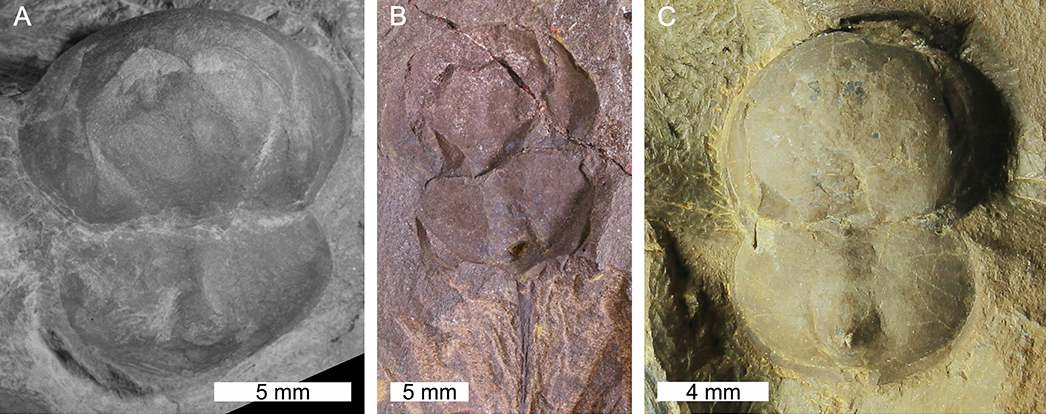
- Fossils of Liomesaspis laevis (A, B) and Liomesaspis birtwelli (C)

Scientific classification
- Kingdom: Animalia
- Phylum: Arthropoda
- Subphylum: Chelicerata
- Order: Xiphosura
- Family: †Belinuridae
- Genus: †Liomesaspis; Raymond, 1944

Synonyms
- Pringlia Raymond, 1944; Palatinaspis Malz & Poschmann, 1993

= Liomesaspis =

Liomesaspis Temporal range: Late Carboniferous–Early Permian, 303–273.01 Ma

Extinct genus of horseshoe crab relatives

Liomesaspis is an extinct genus of xiphosuran, related to the modern horseshoe crab. It lived from the late Carboniferous to the Early Permian.

== Sources ==
- Evolution: What the Fossils Say and Why It Matters by Donald R. Prothero and Carl Buell
- Bringing Fossils To Life: An Introduction To Paleobiology by Donald R. Prothero
