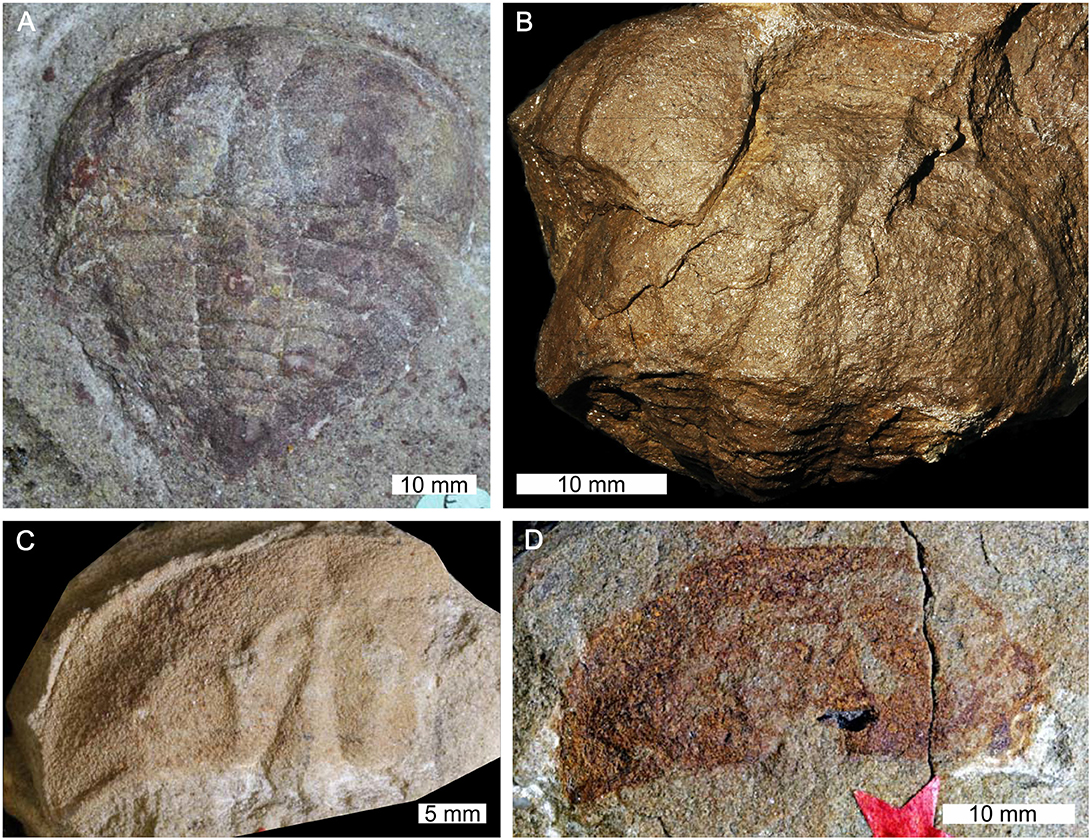
- Images of Kasibelinurus fossils from the Devonian

Scientific classification
- Kingdom: Animalia
- Phylum: Arthropoda
- Subphylum: Chelicerata
- Order: Xiphosura
- Family: †Kasibelinuridae
- Genus: †Kasibelinurus; Pickett, 1993

Type species
- Kasibelinurus amicorum Pickett, 1993

= Kasibelinurus =

Kasibelinurus Temporal range: 419–369 Ma Early Devonian to Late Devonian

Extinct genus of arthropods

Kasibelinurus (meaning "sibling of dart tail" for its perceived relation to Belinurus at the time) is a genus of xiphosuran from the Devonian. It is part of the family Kasibelinuridae. The type species and only species of Kasibelinurus is K. amicorum (derived from Latin word amicus meaning 'friend'). The type species was set by J. Pickett in 1993.

== Description ==
The genus Kasibelinurus was described by Pickett as having "Ophthalmic ridges effaced; precardiac field defined by anterior prolongations of the cardiac furrows; opisthosomal pleurae with distinct inner and outer zones." The same source later states that Kasibelinurus had a telson with restricted movement based on the shape of the opisthosoma.

== See also ==
Patesia - genus of horseshoe crabs formerly thought to be of Kasibelinurus

Houia - genus of dekatriatan formerly thought to be part of Kasibelinurus
