= Xaniopyramis =

Xaniopyramis Temporal range: Early Carboniferous

Scientific classification
- Kingdom: Animalia
- Phylum: Arthropoda
- Subphylum: Chelicerata
- Order: Xiphosura
- Family: †Paleolimulidae
- Genus: †Xaniopyramis; Siveter & Selden, 1987
- Species: †X. linseyi

Binomial name
- †Xaniopyramis linseyi Siveter & Selden, 1987

Genus of horseshoe crab relatives

Xaniopyramis is an extinct genus of xiphosuran, related to the modern horseshoe crab. It lived in the early Carboniferous.

== Species ==
- Xaniopyramis linseyi Siveter and Selden, 1987

== Sources ==
- Invertebrate Palaeontology & Evolution by Euan Neilson Kerr Clarkson
