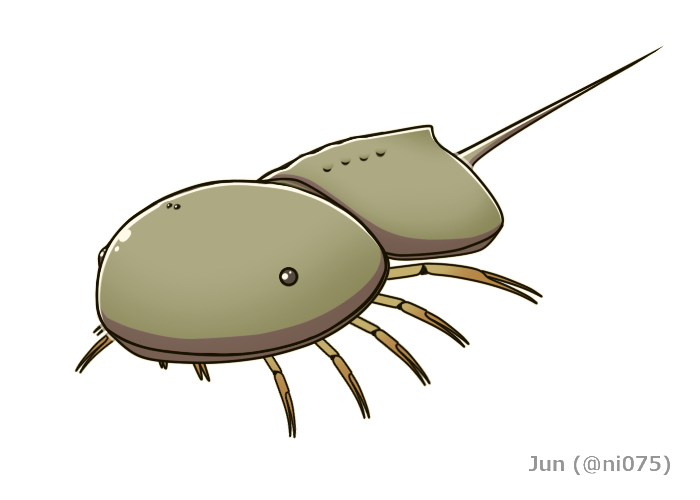
- Reconstruction of Alanops.

Scientific classification
- Kingdom: Animalia
- Phylum: Arthropoda
- Subphylum: Chelicerata
- Order: Xiphosura
- Family: †Belinuridae
- Genus: †Alanops; Racheboeuf et al, 2002
- Species: †A. magnificus

Binomial name
- †Alanops magnificus Racheboeuf et al, 2002

= Alanops =

Alanops Temporal range: Stephanian

Extinct genus of horseshoe crab relative

Alanops is a genus of xiphosuran from the Carboniferous Montceau-les-Mines lagerstätte of France. This genus contains one species, Alanops magnificus. It is known from over 140 specimens and was likely capable of volvation, as evidenced by features on its carapace.

== Description ==
=== Prosoma ===
Alanops has a globose (spherical) prosomal shield with a circular outline. In side view this shield is strongly arched (around 3 times longer than tall) with the curvature increasing as it approaches the front. Its posterior (backwards) margin bends sharply downwards forming a flat wall partly closing off the prosoma. A faint peripheral flange can be seen as a low ridge running around the prosoma. This ridge also delineates two regions of the prosoma. The subfrontal area continues the ventral curvature of the frontal prosoma, with a small beak-like structure and lappet extending from the front. While the posterolateral (back and side) corners are rounded and lack spines, in a few small specimens these are still pointed. The cardiac lobe (a raised area towards the posterior of the prosoma) is weakly differentiated with a faint convex curvature, a smooth surface and being bounded by low furrows. These lateral furrows are deepest towards the back where they become almost straight and converge backwards. In one specimen four pairs of scar-like furrows are preserved as well flanking this lobe; these may represent apodemes (muscle attachment sites). No ridges or spines are present near the eyes, with the eyes themselves being very small and located at the sides. A median tubercle (containing an eye) is also preserved, directly between the lateral eyes.

=== Opisthosoma and telson ===
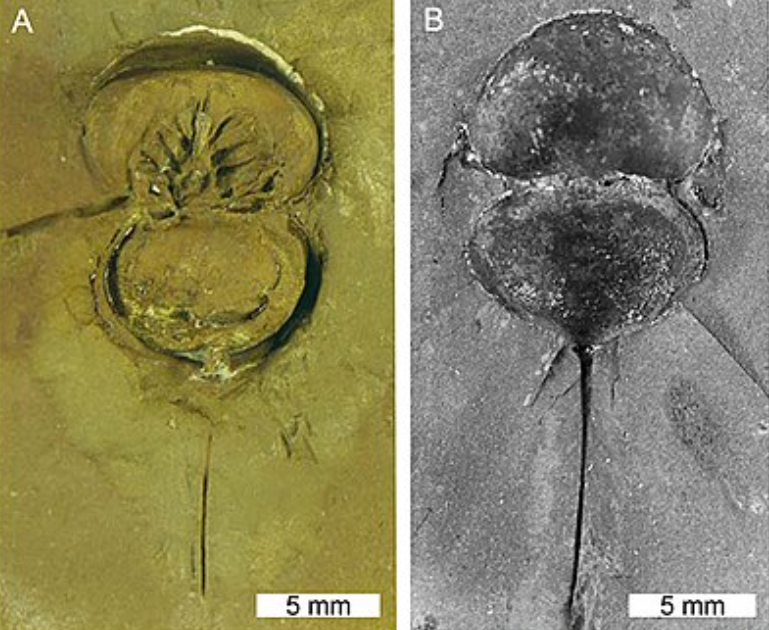
Alanops fossil

The opisthosoma is vaulted (arched) and subtriangular (rounded but triangular) in shape, being around 10% smaller than the prosoma. Its transverse profile is highly convex and rounded to subtriangular. The axis is weakly differentiated and vaulted with no lateral furrows. Four pit-like apodemes are preserved on either side of the axis. The axis segments are only visible in a few specimens, which show four before the fused region supporting the telson. The last of these axial segments is prominent with a spiny boss (stud) pointing backwards. The lateral fields of the opisthosoma are smooth and unsegmented, bounded by a deep furrow separating them from the smooth flange. A wide doublure is present, bounded by a narrow rim like on the prosoma. The opisthosoma becomes flat and forms a subtriangular, vertical platform below the telson, with this platform split by a narrow furrow. The inner side of the opisthosoma has a pair of symmetrical subtriangular plates overhanging an elongate feature, likely analogous to the genital opercula and ducts. A small arched microtergite links the prosoma and opisthosoma, articulating below the back part of the cardiac lobe. The telson is quite large and styliform (needle-like) in shape, with the outwards part bending gently in lateral view. The dorsal side is flattened and bears a small ridge near its base, with the telson having an elliptical cross-section.

=== Limbs ===
Alanops preserves several pairs of prosomal limbs, with these being tucked in much like in corpses of recent horseshoe crabs. The chelicerae are very small, attaching anterior to the mouth and being almost parallel to each other. These are followed by five pairs of walking legs, around 1 cm long, each with long chelae (claws). While these segments are semicircular or flattened in cross-section, this is likely due to post-mortem decay or flattening. The first to third leg pairs have knife-like inner margins of their coxae, which may correspond to gnathobases, which point radially to a median groove which contains a prominent sternal plate.

== Palaeobiology ==
Alanops was likely benthic, as it has long, thin, sigmoidally shaped legs which are ill-suited for swimming. These legs also have long chelae, which suggest they helped to grasp prey. Alongside this, its exoskeleton was very thin, similar to some modern benthic crabs. Many Paleozoic horseshoe crabs which were likely capable of swimming have many spines, which Alanops lacks. This genus likely was not a burrower either, as its prosoma is hemispherical in shape and its subfrontal area is unusually shaped, contrasting with the prosomal arch and penetrative head shield of modern horseshoe crabs. Its fifth pair of legs are longer than the rest, suggesting that they were used to stabilise the animal and in volvation.

The opposing blade-like gnathobases, prehensile chelae and chelicerae overhanging the mouth suggest it likely had a similar diet to modern limulids, which are generalist carnivores. The sternal plate also was likely used in feeding and was heavily sclerotised (hardened). While modern horseshoe crabs mostly feed on bivalves, Alanops's small size suggests it likely fed on softer prey such as conchostracans, worms, or detritus.

Alanops had a wide field of vision as evidenced by its wide-set lateral eyes and the median eyes in-between them. While the lateral eyes do give modern limulids a wide field of vision, they do not give enough image quality to be used as main eyes, instead serving to detect movement.

Several partially enrolled specimens are known, and while none are completely closed, several features show that enrollment was still possible, such as the articulation between the prosoma and opisthosoma, their margins being the right size to fit within each other and having features to interlock them, and the resulting space being large enough for the limbs. Enrollment likely served to protect against predators or to temporarily withstand emersion (being removed from water).

== Palaeoenvironment ==
Fossil and geological evidence pointed towards Montceau-les-Mines being an intermontane, limnic ecosystem. The faunal composition is mostly terrestrial or almost exclusively freshwater clades, with the only usually marine animals being polychaetes (Palaeocampa), which is later identified as a lobopodian. Although some suggests ocean influence of the site, the nearest open marine environment is at least several hundred kilometers away from the locality.
