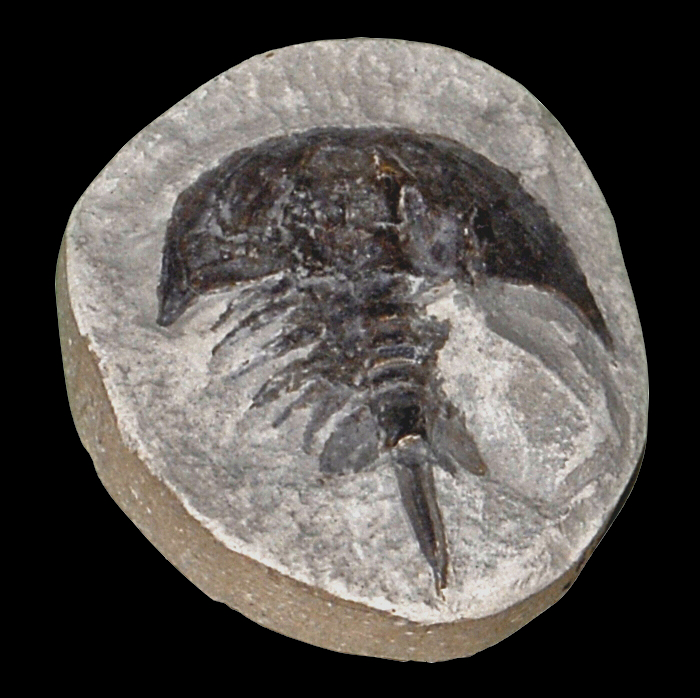
- Fossils of Belinurus lunatus (syn. B. belulus) from Coal Brook Dale, England, on display at Galerie de paléontologie et d'anatomie comparée in Paris.

Scientific classification
- Kingdom: Animalia
- Phylum: Arthropoda
- Subphylum: Chelicerata
- Order: Xiphosura
- Family: †Belinuridae
- Genus: †Belinurus; Bronn, 1839

Type species
- †Belinurus trilobitoides (Buckland, 1837)

Species
- 8 species: †?B. iswariensis (Chernyshev, 1928); †?B. kiltorcanensis Baily, 1869; †B. lacoei (Packard, 1885); †?B. metschensis (Chernyshev, 1928); †B. silesiacus (Roemer, 1883); †?B. stepanovi (Chernyshev, 1928); †B. sustai (Prantl & Přibyl, 1955); †B. trilobitoides (Buckland, 1837)

Synonyms
- Bellinurus Pictet, 1846; Steropis Baily, 1859

= Belinurus =

Belinurus Temporal range: from Devonian to Carboniferous, 409.1–402.5 Ma

Extinct genus of horseshoe crab relatives

Belinurus is an extinct genus of arthropods belonging to the order Xiphosura. It is part of the family Belinuridae, in the infraorder Belinurina. There used to be a longstanding academic controversy on whether Belinurus (König, 1820), Belinurus (Bronn, 1839) or Bellinurus (Pictet, 1846) had priority as a name over the genus. In 2021, the American paleontologist James C. Lamsdell did a study on this controversy and determined that the first name was not formally published and was therefore invalid and that the second one was valid and therefore had priority over the third one, the name of the genus thus being Belinurus.

The genus Belinurus is composed by the species B. trilobitoides (the type species), B. lacoei, B. silesiacus, B. sustai and the dubious species B. iswariensis, B. kiltorcanensis. B. metschensis and B. stepanovi.
