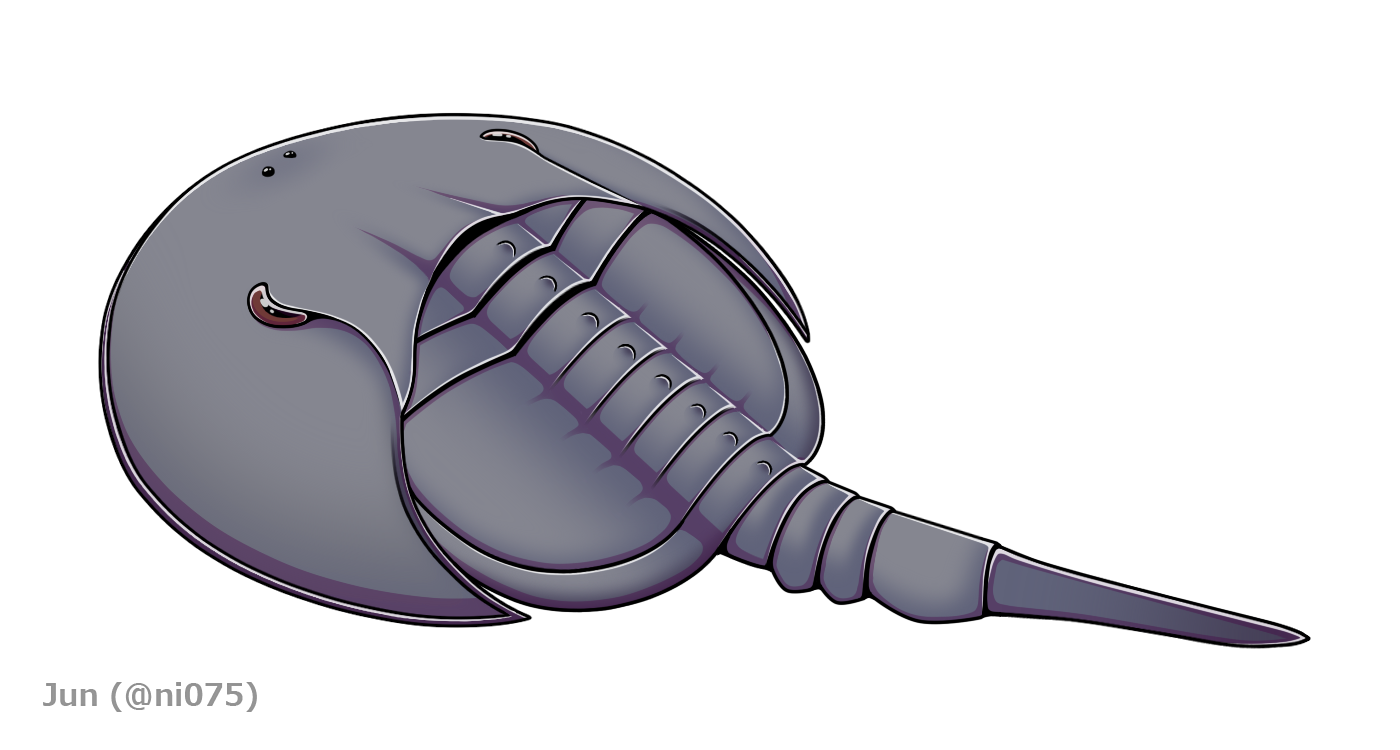
- Restoration of Lunataspis, the oldest named xiphosuran
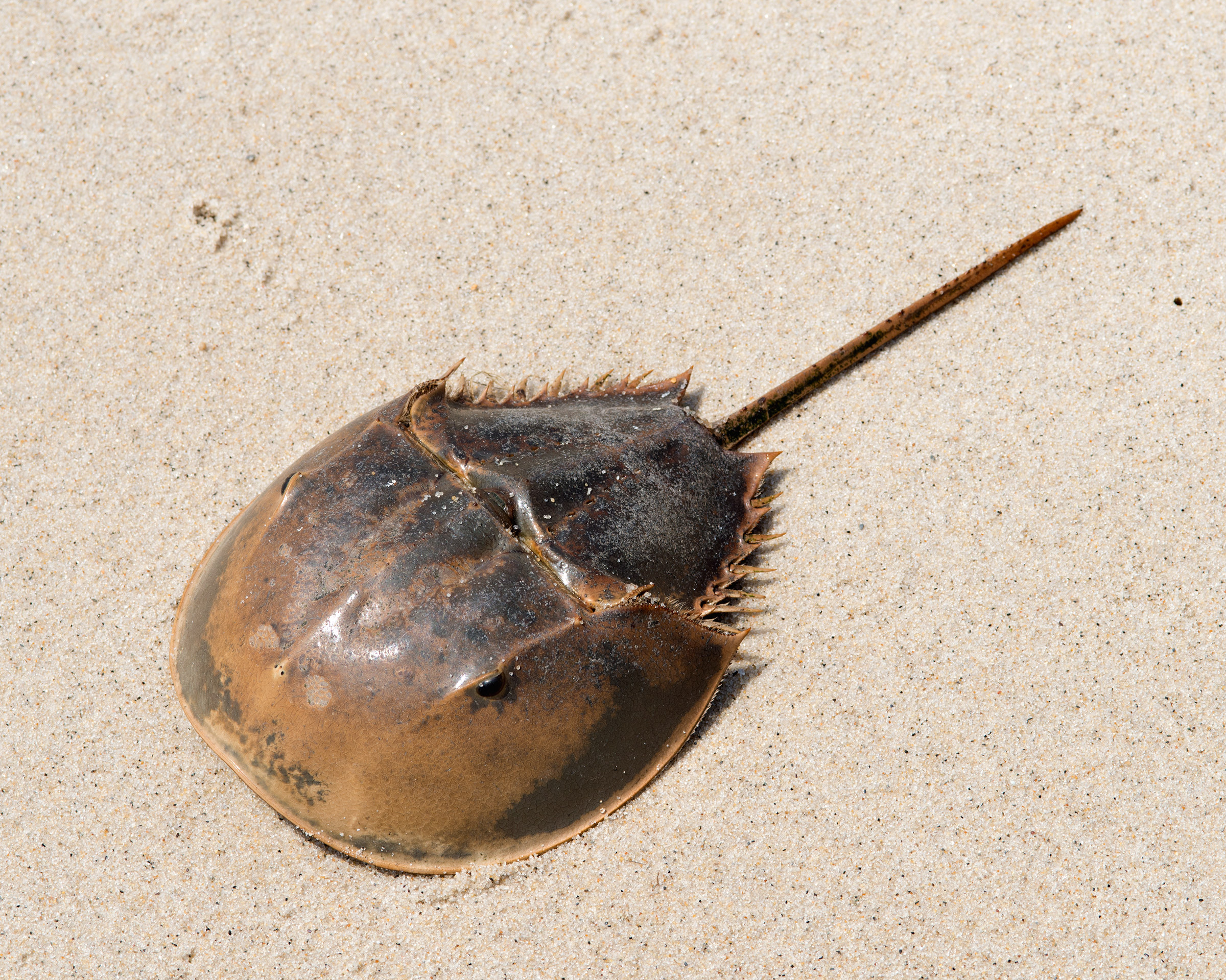
- The extant Atlantic horseshoe crab (Limulus polyphemus)

Scientific classification
- Kingdom: Animalia
- Phylum: Arthropoda
- Subphylum: Chelicerata
- Clade: Prosomapoda
- Order: Xiphosura; Latreille, 1802

Groups
- †Ciurcalimulus; †Lunataspis; †Maldybulakia?; †Willwerathia?; †Kasibelinuridae; Xiphosurida; †Belinuridae; †Paleolimulidae; †Austrolimulidae; Limulidae

= Xiphosura =

Xiphosura Temporal range: Late Tremadocian–Present, 480–0 Ma

Order of marine chelicerates

Xiphosura (/zɪfoʊˈsjʊərə/; from Ancient Greek ξίφος (xíphos) 'sword' and οὐρά (ourá) 'tail', in reference to its sword-like telson) is an order of arthropods related to arachnids. They are more commonly known as horseshoe crabs (a name applied more specifically to the only extant family, Limulidae). They first appear in the fossil record in the Early Ordovician, around 480 million years ago. Currently, there are only four living species. Xiphosura contains one suborder, Xiphosurida, and several stem-genera.

The group has hardly changed in appearance in hundreds of millions of years; the modern horseshoe crabs look almost identical to prehistoric genera and are considered to be living fossils. The most notable difference between ancient and modern forms is that the abdominal segments in present species are fused into a single unit in adults.

Xiphosura were historically placed in the class Merostomata, although this term was intended to encompass also the eurypterids, whence it denoted what is now thought to be an unnatural (paraphyletic) group (although this is a grouping recovered in some recent cladistic analyses). Although the name Merostomata is still seen in textbooks, without reference to the Eurypterida, some have urged that this usage should be discouraged. The Merostomata label originally did not include Eurypterida, although they were added in as a better understanding of the extinct group evolved. Now Eurypterida is classified within Sclerophorata together with the arachnids, and therefore, Merostomata is now a synonym of Xiphosura. Several recent phylogenomic studies place Xiphosura within Arachnida, often as the sister group of Ricinulei; included among them are taxonomically comprehensive analyses of both morphology and genomes, which have recovered Merostomata as a derived clade of arachnids.

== Description ==
Modern xiphosurans reach up to 60 cm (24 in) in adult length, but the Paleozoic species were often far smaller, some as small as 1 to 3 cm (0.39 to 1.18 in) long.

Their bodies are divided into an anterior prosoma and a posterior opisthosoma, or abdomen. The upper surface of the prosoma is covered by a semicircular carapace, while the underside bears five pairs of walking legs and a pair of pincer-like chelicerae. The mouth is located on underside of the center of the prosoma, between the bases of the walking legs, and lies behind a lip-like structure called the labrum. The exoskeleton consist of a tough cuticle, but do not contain any crystalline biominerals. Like scorpions, xiphosurans have an exocuticular layer of hyaline which exhibits UV fluorescence.

Xiphosurans have up to four eyes, located in the carapace. Two compound eyes are on the side of the prosoma, with one or two median ocelli towards the front. The compound eyes are simpler in structure than those of other arthropods, with the individual ommatidia not being arranged in a compact pattern. They can probably detect movement, but are unlikely to be able to form a true image. In front of the ocelli is an additional organ that probably functions as a chemoreceptor.

The first four pairs of legs end in pincers, and have a series of spines, called the gnathobase, on the inner surface. The spines are used to masticate the food, tearing it up before passing it to the mouth. The fifth and final pair of legs, however, has no pincers or spines, instead having structures for cleaning the gills and pushing mud out of the way while burrowing. Behind the walking legs is a sixth set of appendages, the chilaria, which are greatly reduced in size and covered in hairs and spines. These are thought to be vestiges of the limbs of an absorbed first opisthosomal segment.

The opisthosoma is divided into a forward mesosoma, with flattened appendages, and a metasoma at the rear, which has no appendages. In modern forms, the whole of the opisthosoma is fused into a single unsegmented structure. The underside of the opisthosoma carries the genital openings and five pairs of flap-like gills.

The opisthosoma terminates in a long caudal spine, commonly referred to as a telson (though this same term is also used for a different structure in crustaceans). The spine is highly mobile, and is used to push the animal upright if it is accidentally turned over.

=== Internal anatomy ===
The mouth opens into a sclerotised oesophagus, which leads to a crop and gizzard. After grinding up its food in the gizzard, the animal regurgitates any inedible portions, and passes the remainder to the true stomach. The stomach secretes digestive enzymes, and is attached to an intestine and two large caeca that extend through much of the body, and absorb the nutrients from the food. The intestine terminates in a sclerotised rectum, which opens just in front of the base of the caudal spine.

Xiphosurans have well-developed circulatory systems, with numerous arteries that send blood from the long tubular heart to the body tissues, and then to two longitudinal sinuses next to the gills. After being oxygenated, the blood flows into the body cavity, and back to the heart. The blood contains haemocyanin, a blue copper-based pigment performing the same function as haemoglobin in vertebrates, and also has blood cells that aid in clotting.

The excretory system consists of two pairs of coxal glands connected to a bladder that opens near the base of the last pair of walking legs. The brain is relatively large, and, as in many arthropods, surrounds the oesophagus. In both sexes, the single gonad lies next to the intestine and opens on the underside of the opisthosoma.

== Reproduction ==
Xiphosurans move to shallow water to mate. The male climbs onto the back of the female, gripping her with his first pair of walking legs. The female digs out a depression in the sand, and lays from 200 to 300 eggs, which the male covers with sperm. The pair then separates, and the female buries the eggs.

The egg is about 2–3 mm (0.08–0.12 in) across. Inside the egg, the embryo goes through four molts before it hatches into a larva, often called a 'trilobite larva' due to its superficial resemblance to a trilobite. At this stage it has no telson yet, and the larva is lecithotrophic (non-feeding) and planktonic, subsisting on the maternal yolk before settling to the bottom to molt, after which the telson first appears. Through a series of successive moults, the larva develops additional gills, increases the length of its caudal spine, and gradually assumes the adult form. Modern xiphosurans reach sexual maturity after about three years of growth.

== Evolution ==
=== Evolutionary history ===
The oldest known xiphosurans are specimens from the Early Ordovician Fezouata Formation of Morocco, dating to around 480 million years ago, but these are currently undescribed. The oldest currently named stem-xiphosuran, Lunataspis, is known from the late Ordovician of Canada, around 445 million years ago. Ciurcalimulus is the only Xiphosuran known from the following Silurian. Xiphosurida first appears during the late Devonian. A major radiation of freshwater xiphosurids, the Belinuridae, is known from the Carboniferous, with the oldest representatives of the modern family Limulidae also possibly appearing during this time, though they only appear in abundance during the Triassic. Another major radiation of freshwater xiphosurans, the Austrolimulidae, is known from the Permian and Triassic. As a group they have never showed much diversity in regard of species. Less than 50 fossil species are known from the Carboniferous period, when they were at their most diverse. The last common ancestor of modern limulids has been suggested to date to the Jurassic-Cretaceous boundary based on molecular clock dating though depending on phylogeny the fossil record may suggest a split as old as the Triassic.

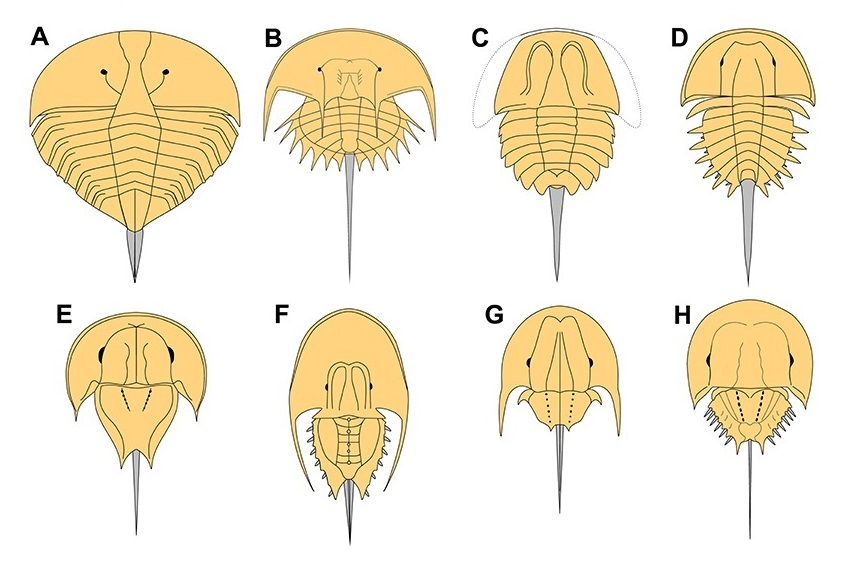
Representative members of various xiphosuran clades: A, stem xiphosurids (Kasibelinurus); B, Belinuridae (Euproops); C, Limulina (Bellinuroopsis); D, Rolfeiidae (Rolfeia); E, Paleolimulidae (Paleolimulus); F, Limuloidea (Valloisella); G, Austrolimulidae (Tasmaniolimulus); H, Limulidae

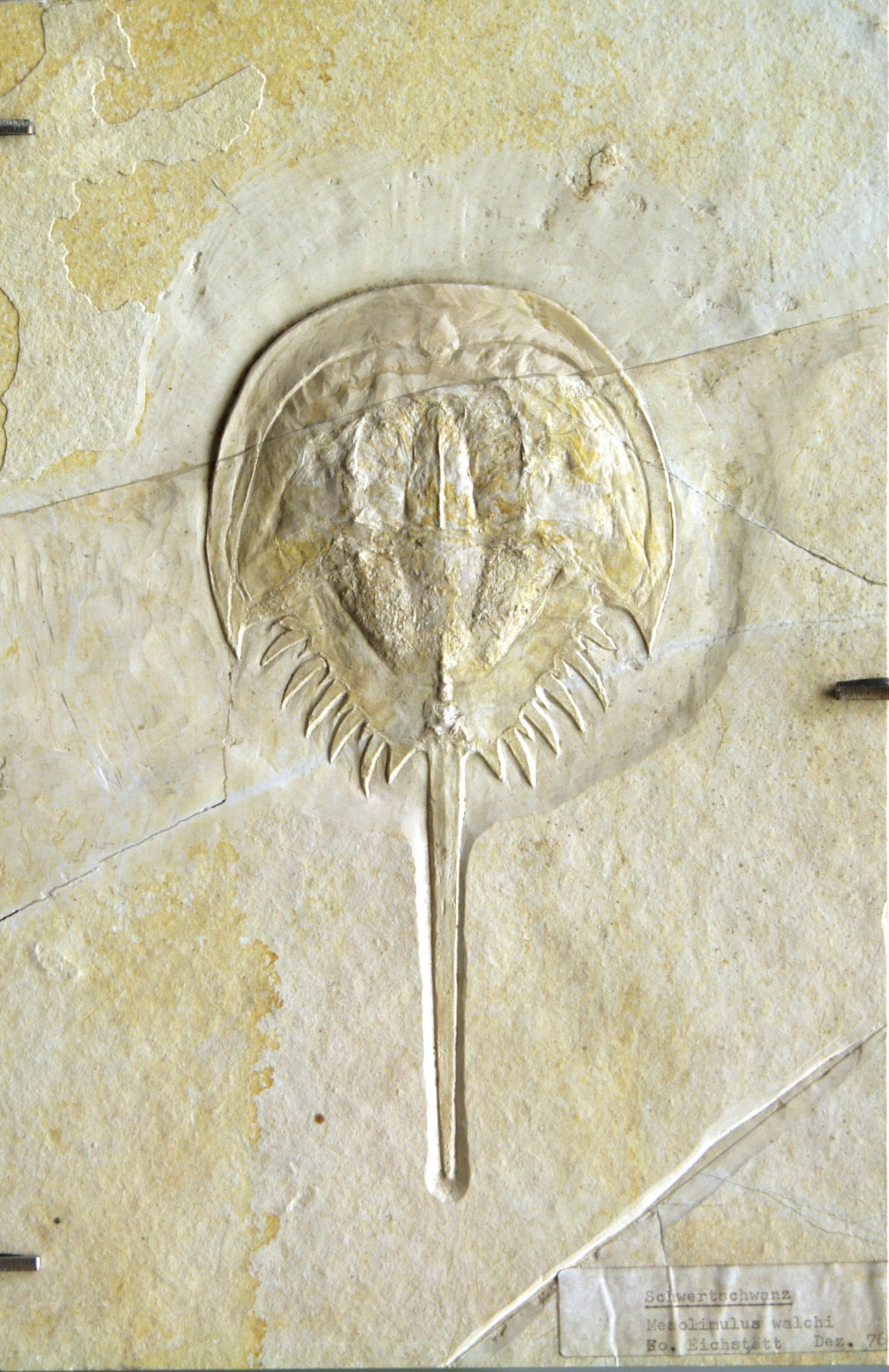
Mesolimulus from the Jurassic Solnhofen limestone

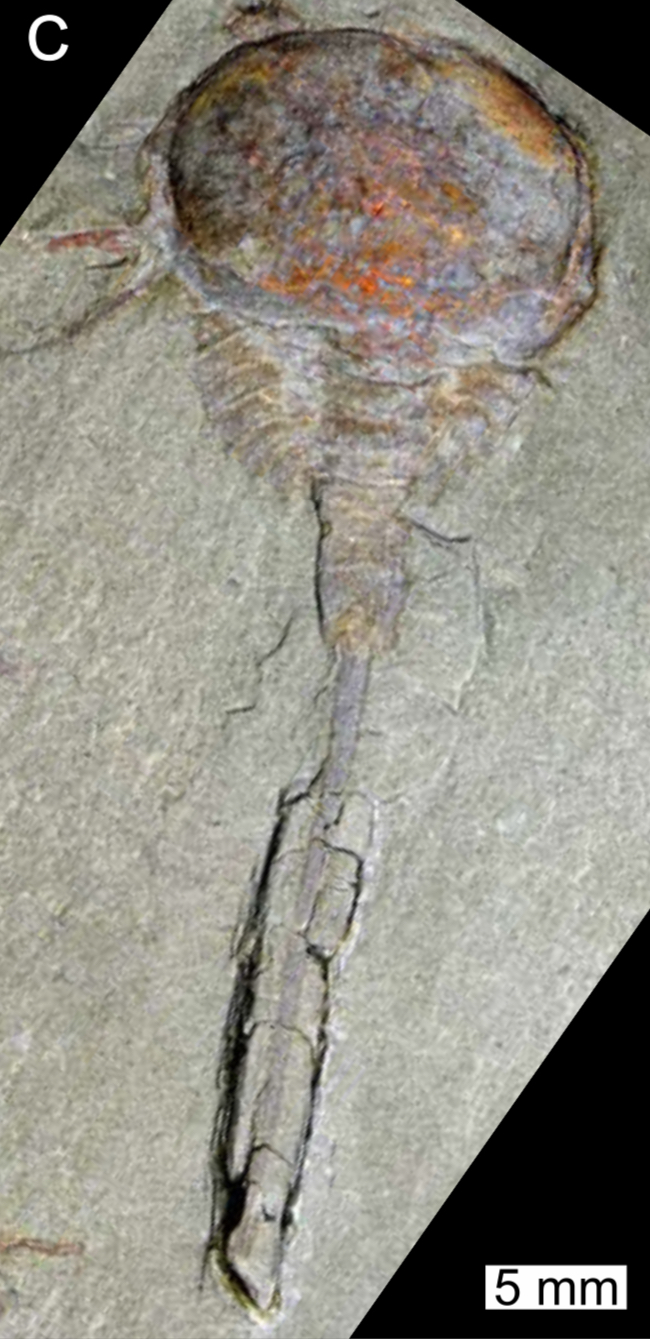
Unnamed xiphosuran from the Lower Ordovician Fezouata Formation of Morocco, the oldest known record of the group

=== Phylogeny ===
Phylogenetic tree after Lasmdell 2020.

- Xiphosura
  - - - Limulina
        - - - - - Limulidae
                  - - - - - - - Carcinoscorpius rotundicauda (Mangrove horseshoe crab)
                              - - - Tachypleus gigas (Indo-Pacific horseshoe crab)
                                  - †Tachypleus decheni
                                - - †Tachypleus syriacus
                                  - Tachypleus tridentatus (tri-spine horseshoe crab)
                            - †Heterolimulus gadeai
                          - †Volanalimulus madagascarensis
                        - - - Limulus polyphemus (Atlantic horseshoe crab)
                            - †Limulus coffini
                          - - †Crenatolimulus paluxyensis
                            - †Crenatolimulus darwini
                      - - †Keuperlimulus vicensis
                        - - - - †Casterolimulus kletti
                              - †Victalimulus mcqueeni
                            - †Allolimulus woodwardi
                          - - †Mesolimulus crespelli
                            - - - †Mesolimulus walchi
                                - †Mesolimulus tafraoutensis
                              - †Mesolimulus sibiricus
                    - †Tarracolimulus rieki
                  - - †Yunnanolimulus henkeli
                    - †Yunnanolimulus luopingensis
                - †Austrolimulidae
                  - †Boeotiaspis longispinus
                  - †Shpineviolimulus jakovlevi
                  - - †Panduralimulus babcocki
                    - - †Tasmaniolimulus patersoni
                      - - - - †Limulitella bronni
                            - †Limulitella tejraensis
                          - †Psammolimulus gottingensis
                        - - †Batracholimulus fuchsbergensis
                          - - - †Vaderlimulus tricki
                              - †Austrolimulus fletcheri
                            - †Dubbolimulus peetae
              - †Valloisella lievinensis
            - †Paleolimulidae
              - †Norilimulus woodae
              - - - †Xaniopyramis linseyi
                  - †Moravurus rehori
                - - †Paleolimulus kunguricus
                  - †Paleolimulus signatus
          - †Rolfeia fouldenensis
        - †Bellinuroopsis rossicus
      - †Belinurina
        - - - - - - - - †Prestwichianella anthrax
                      - - †Prestwichianella mariae
                        - †Prestwichianella rotundatus
                      - - †Liomesaspis laevis
                        - - †Anacontium carpenteri
                          - - †Pringlia birtwelli
                            - - †Stilpnocephalus pontebbanus
                              - †Alanops magnifica
                    - †Andersoniella sp.
                  - †Euproops danae
                - †Parabelinurus lunatus
              - †Macrobelinurus arcuatus
            - - †Koenigiella reginae
              - †Koenigiella truemanii
          - - †Belinurus trilobitoides
            - †Belinurus bellulus
        - †Patesia randalli
    - - †Pickettia carteri
      - †Kasibelinurus amoricum
  - - †Lunataspis aurora
    - †Lunataspis borealis

=== Taxonomy ===
Xiphosuran classification as of 2018:

Order Xiphosura Latreille, 1802

- †Ciurcalimulus Lamsdell, 2025 (Silurian)
- †Lunataspis Rudkin, Young & Nowlan, 2008 (Ordovician)
- †Maldybulakia Tesakov & Alekseev, 1998 (Devonian)
- †Willwerathia Størmer, 1969 (Devonian)
- †Kasibelinuridae Pickett, 1993 (Middle Devonian to Late Devonian)
- Suborder Xiphosurida
  - †Infraorder Belinurina
    - †Belinuridae Zittel & Eastman, 1913 (Middle Devonian to Upper Carboniferous)
  - Infraorder Limulina
    - †Bellinuroopsis Chernyshev, 1933 (Carboniferous)
    - †Rolfeiidae Selden & Siveter, 1987 (Early Carboniferous to Early Permian)
    - Superfamily †Paleolimuloidea Anderson & Selden, 1997
      - †Paleolimulidae Raymond, 1944 (Carboniferous to Permian)
    - Superfamily Limuloidea
      - †Valloisella Racheboeuf, 1992 (Carboniferous)
      - †Austrolimulidae Riek, 1955 (Early Permian-Early Jurassic)
      - Limulidae Zittel, 1885 (Triassic to recent)
        - Limulinae Zittel, 1885 (Late Jurassic-Present)
        - Tachypleinae Pocock, 1902 (Late Cretaceous-Recent)

Two groups were originally included in the Xiphosura, but since have been assigned to separate classes:

- Aglaspida Walcott, 1911 (Cambrian to Ordovician)
- Chasmataspidida Caster & Brooks, 1956 (Lower Ordovician)

== See also ==
- Synziphosurine
- List of xiphosurans
