= 2019 in arthropod paleontology =

This list of fossil arthropods described in 2019 is a list of new taxa of trilobites, fossil insects, crustaceans, arachnids and other fossil arthropods of every kind that were described during the year 2019, as well as other significant discoveries and events related to arthropod paleontology that occurred in the year 2019.

== General research ==
- A revision of higher-level arthropod taxonomy is published by Aria (2019), who proposes the name Cenocondyla for the least inclusive group containing both Mandibulata and Chelicerata.
- A study on the molecular composition and microanatomy of the eyes of 54-million-year-old crane flies from the Fur Formation (Denmark), evaluating its implications for the knowledge of optical systems of other ancient arthropods (especially trilobites), is published by Lindgren et al. (2019).

== Arachnids ==
=== Research ===
- Two new specimens of laniatorid harvestmen (an adult specimen assignable to the species Proholoscotolemon nemastomoides and a smaller specimen belonging or related to the genus Proholoscotolemon) are described from the Eocene Baltic amber by Bartel & Dunlop (2019).
- A review of the phylogenetic hypotheses of scorpion interrelationships, as well as of scorpion palaeontology, is published by Howard et al. (2019), who also provide a list of scorpion fossil calibrations for use in molecular dating.
- A fossil spider, possibly a juvenile female golden silk orb-weaver, is described from the Lower Eocene Palana Formation of the Gurha opencast lignite mine (western Rajasthan, India) by Patel, Rana & Selden (2019), representing the first fossil spider from India which wasn't found in amber.
- A review of the fossil record and evolutionary history of spiders, reevaluating the phylogenetic placement of key fossils and aiming to determine whether there has been a major turnover in the spider fauna between the Mesozoic and Cenozoic, is published online by Magalhaes et al. (2019).

=== New taxa ===
Name	Novelty	Status	Authors	Age	Type locality	Country	Notes	Images
Caestaranea	Gen. et sp. nov	Valid	Selden, Huang & Garwood	Middle–Late Jurassic	Haifanggou Formation	China	A palpimanoid spider. Genus includes new species C. jurassica.	
Chaerilobuthus hansgeorgmuelleri	Sp. nov	Valid	Lourenço in Lourenço & Velten	Cretaceous	Burmese amber	Myanmar	A scorpion belonging to the family Chaerilobuthidae.	
Colossopantopodus nanus	Sp. nov	Valid	Sabroux et al.	Late Jurassic	Solnhofen Limestone	Germany	A sea spider.	
Cosmobunus sagani	Sp. nov	Valid	Palencia et al.	Miocene (Burdigalian)	Rubielos de Mora Basin	Spain	A member of Opiliones, a species of Cosmobunus.	
Eatoniana crinita	Sp. nov	Valid	Sidorchuk et al.	Eocene	Baltic amber	Russia (Kaliningrad Oblast)	A mite belonging to the family Erythraeidae.	
Eomesothele	Gen. et sp. nov	Valid	Wunderlich	Late Cretaceous (Cenomanian)	Burmese amber	Myanmar	A spider belonging to group Mesothelae, assigned to the new family Eomesothelidae. The type species is E. noninclinata.	
Eumesosoma abdelmawlai	Sp. nov	Valid	Elsaka, Mitov & Dunlop	Eocene	Baltic amber	Europe (Baltic Sea region)	A harvestman, a species of Eumesosoma.	
?Eurycyde golem	Sp. nov	Valid	Sabroux et al.	Late Jurassic	Solnhofen Limestone	Germany	A sea spider belonging to the family Ascorhynchidae.	
Intermesothele	Gen. et sp. nov	Valid	Wunderlich	Late Cretaceous (Cenomanian)	Burmese amber	Myanmar	A spider belonging to group Mesothelae, possibly belonging to the family Eomesothelidae. The type species is I. pulcher.	
Jinjumegops	Gen. et sp. nov	Valid	Park, Nam & Selden	Early Cretaceous (Albian)	Jinju Formation	South Korea	A spider belonging to the family Lagonomegopidae. The type species is J. dalingwateri.	
Koreamegops	Gen. et sp. nov	Valid	Park, Nam & Selden	Early Cretaceous (Albian)	Jinju Formation	South Korea	A spider belonging to the family Lagonomegopidae. The type species is K. samsiki.	
Lutetiana	Gen. et sp. nov	Valid	Selden & Wappler	Eocene (Lutetian)	Messel pit	Germany	A spider, possibly a member of the family Cybaeidae. The type species is L. neli.	
Metagonia esquincacanoi	Sp. nov		García-Villafuerte	Miocene (Aquitanian)	Mexican amber	Mexico	A species of Metagonia.	
Neoliodes andreneli	Sp. nov	Valid	Arillo et al.	Early Cretaceous	Lebanese amber	Lebanon	A mite belonging to the family Neoliodidae. Subsequently transferred to the separate genus Azarliodes.	
Onychopalpus	Gen. et sp. nov	Valid	Selden, Huang & Garwood	Middle–Late Jurassic	Haifanggou Formation	China	A palpimanoid spider. Genus includes new species O. thomisoides.	
Paragilarovia	Gen. et sp. nov	Valid	Elsaka, Mitov & Dunlop	Eocene	Baltic amber	Europe (Baltic Sea region)	A harvestman belonging to the family Nemastomatidae. Genus includes new species P. hochae.	
Procaeculus coineaui	Sp. nov	Valid	Porta et al.	Late Cretaceous (Cenomanian)	Burmese amber	Myanmar	A mite belonging to the family Caeculidae.	
Protolophus hoffeinsi	Sp. nov	Valid	Elsaka, Mitov & Dunlop	Eocene	Baltic amber	Europe (Baltic Sea region)	A harvestman, a species of Protolophus.	
Scolotydaeus vlaskini	Sp. nov	Valid	Klimov et al.	Late Eocene	Rovno amber	Ukraine	A mite belonging to the family Paratydeidae.	
Sinaranea brevicrus	Sp. nov	Valid	Selden, Huang & Garwood	Middle–Late Jurassic	Haifanggou Formation	China	A palpimanoid spider.	
Tanytydeus pogrebnyaki	Sp. nov	Valid	Klimov et al.	Late Eocene	Rovno amber	Ukraine	A mite belonging to the family Paratydeidae.	

== Crustaceans ==
=== Research ===
- A global dataset of exceptionally preserved muscles and muscle attachment scars in fossil malacostracan specimens is compiled by Klompmaker et al. (2019).
- A three-dimensionally preserved tanaidacean specimen belonging or related to the species Jurapseudes friedericianus is described from the Middle Jurassic (Callovian) Ornatenton Formation (Germany) by Schädel et al. (2019).
- A study on the evolutionary history of decapod crustaceans is published by Wolfe et al. (2019).
- A study on the chemical composition of two specimens of fossilized shrimps from the Cretaceous Romualdo and Ipubi formations (Araripe Basin, Brazil), and on its implications for inferring the course of the processes of fossilization of these crustaceans, is published by Barros et al. (2019).
- A study on the Middle Jurassic palaeoenvironment of La Voulte (France), as indicated by data from exceptionally preserved eyes of the polychelidan lobster Voulteryon parvulus and from epibiontic brachiopods associated with V. parvulus, is published by Audo et al. (2019).
- A study on the anatomy of the holotype specimen of a putative Paleocene shark Platyacrodus unicus is published by Bogan, Agnolin & Ezcurra (2019), who reinterpret this specimen as a carapace of a small retroplumid crab belonging to the genus Costacopluma.
- An achelatan larval fossil with an intermediate type of morphology, interpreted as the oldest occurrence of an achelatan lobster larva reported so far, is described from the Toarcian Posidonia Shale (Germany) by Haug, Haug & Schweigert (2019).
- Redescription of the isopod species Palaega sismondai Ristori (1891) is published by Hyžný, Pasini & Garassino (2019), who transfer this species to the genus Bathynomus.
- A moult of a giant isopod is described from the early Oligocene Ranzano Formation by Pasini & Garassino (2019), representing the oldest fossil record of the genus Bathynomus from Italy.
- A study on the Late Devonian ostracods from the Yangdi and Nandong sections in South China, and on their responses to the Frasnian-Famennian event, is published by Song, Huang & Gong (2019).
- A diverse earliest Triassic ostracod fauna is reported from the Yangou section in South China by Qiu et al. (2019).
- A revision of ostracods from the Upper Oligocene to Lower Miocene Pirabas Formation (Brazil) is published by Nogueira, Ramos & Hunt (2019).
- A study on changes of diversity of Neogene fossil marine ostracods from Java, Indonesia is published by Shin et al. (2019).
- A study on deep-sea benthic ostracod assemblages from the southern Sea of Japan covering the last 2 million years, evaluating their responses to the Mid-Brunhes Event, orbital-scale climatic cycles, and fluctuations of the Tsushima Warm Current, is published by Huang et al. (2019).
- A three-dimensionally preserved specimen of a late growth stage of the phosphatocopid species Cyclotron angelini is described from the Furongian strata of northern Poland by Olempska et al. (2019).
- A study on the ecology of clam shrimps from the Anjiagou and Hengdaozi beds of the Lower Cretaceous Yixian Formation (China) is published by Hethke et al. (2019).
- A study on the oxygen isotope composition of whale barnacle shells from three Pleistocene localities along the eastern Pacific coast, and on their implications for the knowledge of the history of whale migrations, is published by Taylor et al. (2019).
- A study on the internal soft-tissue anatomy of Hesslandona angustata is published by Liu et al. (2019).

=== New taxa ===
==== Malacostracans ====
Name	Novelty	Status	Authors	Age	Type locality	Country	Notes	Images
Acanthocarpus osborni	Sp. nov	Valid	Feldmann, Schweitzer & Phillips	Oligocene		United States	A crab, a species of Acanthocarpus.	
Ahazianassa	Gen. et comb. nov	Valid	Karasawa et al.	Late Cretaceous (Campanian–Maastrichtian)	Izumi Group	Japan	A member of the family Gourretiidae; a new genus for "Callianassa" masanorii Karasawa (1998).	
Alontecarcinus	Gen. et sp. nov	Valid	De Angeli & Caporiondo	Eocene (Bartonian)		Italy	A crab belonging to the family Potamidae. The type species is A. buratoi.	
Amatukamius	Gen. et comb. nov	Valid	Karasawa & Ohara	Early Cretaceous (Barremian)	Arida Formation	Japan	A member of Axiidea belonging to the family Micheleidae; a new genus for "Callianassa" sakakuraorum Karasawa (2000).	
Anapagurus dalessandroi	Sp. nov	Valid	Beschin, Busulini & Tessier in Beschin et al.	Eocene (Priabonian)		Italy	A member of the family Paguridae.	
Annuntidiogenes elongatus	Sp. nov	Valid	Fraaije et al.	Late Jurassic (Tithonian)	Ernstbrunn Limestone	Austria	A hermit crab belonging to the family Annuntidiogenidae.	
Annuntidiogenes hoelderi	Sp. nov	Valid	Fraaije et al.	Late Jurassic (Tithonian)	Ernstbrunn Limestone	Austria	A hermit crab belonging to the family Annuntidiogenidae.	
Anoplocarcinus	Gen. et sp. nov	Valid	Schweitzer et al.	Early Cretaceous (Albian)	Hudspeth Formation	United States	A crab belonging to the group Raninoida and to the family Orithopsidae. The type species is A. hudspethi.	
Aragolambrus	Gen. et sp. nov	Valid	Ferratges, Zamora & Aurell	Eocene (Ypresian)		Spain	A crab belonging to the family Parthenopidae. Genus includes new species A. collinsi.	
Archaeochiapasa	Gen. et sp. nov	Valid	Guinot, Carbot-Chanona & Vega	Late Cretaceous (Cenomanian)	Sierra Madre Formation	Mexico	A crab belonging to the group Heterotremata, assigned to the new family Archaeochiapasidae. The type species is A. mardoqueoi.	
Archaeopus burgessi	Sp. nov	Valid	Nyborg et al.	Late Cretaceous (Campanian)	Cedar District Formation	Canada	A crab belonging to the family Retroplumidae.	
Archaeopus diabolus	Sp. nov	Valid	Schweitzer et al.	Late Cretaceous		United States		
Archaeopus hoploserratus	Sp. nov	Valid	Nyborg et al.	Late Cretaceous (Campanian)	Northumberland Formation	Canada	A crab belonging to the family Retroplumidae.	
Archaeopus morenoensis	Sp. nov	Valid	Nyborg et al.	Late Cretaceous (Maastrichtian)	Moreno Formation	United States	A crab belonging to the family Retroplumidae.	
Bachmayerus gasparici	Sp. nov	Valid	Fraaije et al.	Late Jurassic (Tithonian)	Ernstbrunn Limestone	Austria	A hermit crab belonging to the family Diogenidae.	
Bachmayerus matushyznyi	Sp. nov	Valid	Fraaije et al.	Late Jurassic (Tithonian)	Ernstbrunn Limestone	Austria	A hermit crab belonging to the family Diogenidae.	
Bahiacaris	Gen. et comb. nov	Valid	Schweitzer et al.	Cretaceous		Brazil	A caridean shrimp; a new genus for "Atyoida" roxoi Beurlen (1950). Announced in 2013; validated in 2023.	
Bathycalliax otsuka	Sp. nov	Valid	Ando, Kawano & Ugai	Eocene	Sakasegawa Formation	Japan	A member of Axiidea belonging to the family Bathycalliacidae.	
Bolcacalliax	Gen. et comb. nov	Valid	Pasini et al.	Eocene (Ypresian)		Italy	A member of the family Callianassidae; a new genus for "Protaxius" eocenicus Secrétan (1975).	
Brachynotus multituberculatus	Sp. nov	Valid	Beschin, Busulini & Tessier in Beschin et al.	Eocene (Priabonian)		Italy	A species of Brachynotus.	
Calappilia gableorum	Sp. nov	Valid	Feldmann, Schweitzer & Phillips	Oligocene		United States	A species of Calappilia.	
Calappilia granulosa	Sp. nov	Valid	Feldmann, Schweitzer & Phillips	Oligocene		United States	A species of Calappilia.	
Calappilia guttata	Sp. nov	Valid	Pasini, Garassino & Damarco	Oligocene (Rupelian)		Italy	A species of Calappilia.	
Calappilia perreaulti	Sp. nov	Valid	Feldmann, Schweitzer & Phillips	Oligocene		United States	A species of Calappilia.	
Callichimaera	Gen. et sp. nov	Valid	Luque et al.	Late Cretaceous (Cenomanian to Turonian)	Churuvita Group; Frontier Formation	Colombia; United States	A crab belonging to the new family Callichimaeridae. The type species is C. perplexa.	
Caloxanthus kavanaghi	Sp. nov	Valid	Collins, Garvie & Mellish	Cretaceous (Albian/Cenomanian)	Del Rio Formation	United States	A crab belonging to the group Etyoidea and to the family Feldmannidae.	
Cenocorystes libbyae	Sp. nov	Valid	Van Bakel et al.	Late Cretaceous (Maastrichtian)	Peedee Formation	United States	A palaeocorystoid crab.	
Corallomursia prominens	Sp. nov	Valid	Beschin, Busulini & Tessier in Beschin et al.	Eocene (Priabonian)		Italy	A member of the family Calappidae.	
Costadromia	Gen. et sp. nov	Valid	Feldmann & Schweitzer	Late Cretaceous (late Campanian)	Wenonah Formation	United States	A sponge crab. The type species is C. hajzeri.	
Cretainermis	Gen. et sp. nov	Valid	Prado, Calado & Barreto	Early Cretaceous (Aptian)	Romualdo Formation	Brazil	A member of Penaeoidea. Genus includes new species C. pernambucensis.	
Cretamaja klompmakeri	Sp. nov	Valid	González-León & Moreno-Bedmar in Vega, González-León & Moreno-Bedmar	Early Cretaceous (Barremian)	Zapotitlan Formation	Mexico	A crab.	
Cretatrizocheles doerflesensis	Sp. nov	Valid	Fraaije et al.	Late Jurassic (Tithonian)	Ernstbrunn Limestone	Austria	A hermit crab belonging to the family Pylochelidae.	
Cymodoce (?) scopula	Sp. nov	Valid	Fraaije et al.	Early Cretaceous (Albian)	Basque-Cantabrian Basin	Spain	A sphaeromatid isopod.	
Daragrapsus setalis	Sp. nov	Valid	Beschin, Busulini & Tessier in Beschin et al.	Eocene (Priabonian)		Italy	A member of Grapsoidea of uncertain phylogenetic placement.	
Dardanus caporiondoi	Sp. nov	Valid	Ceccon & De Angeli	Early Oligocene		Italy	A species of Dardanus.	
Devonoaxius	Gen. et sp. nov	Valid	Feldmann & Schweitzer	Devonian (Famennian)	Ohio Shale	United States	A member of Axiidea. Genus includes new species D. garlandi.	
Dinocarcinus	Gen. et sp. nov	Valid	Van Bakel, Hyžný, Valentin & Robin in Robin et al.	Late Cretaceous (late Campanian)		France	A crab, a member of Portunoidea sensu lato. The type species is D. velauciensis. Announced in 2019; validated in 2023.	
Doraranina	Gen. et sp. nov	Valid	Gustafson, Nyborg & van Bakel	Early Eocene	Lookingglass Formation	United States	A crab belonging to the group Raninoidea and to the family Lyreididae. Genus includes new species D. manleyi.	
Dromiopsis marginospinosa	Sp. nov	Valid	Beschin, Busulini & Tessier in Beschin et al.	Eocene (Priabonian)		Italy	A member of the family Dromiidae.	
Dromiopsis oscari	Sp. nov	Valid	Nyborg et al.	Early Cretaceous (Albian)	Hudspeth Formation	United States		
?Dromiopsis rocchettii	Sp. nov	Valid	Beschin, Busulini & Tessier in Beschin et al.	Eocene (Priabonian)		Italy	A member of the family Dromiidae.	
Ebalia pumicosa	Sp. nov	Valid	Ceccon & De Angeli	Early Oligocene		Italy	A species of Ebalia.	
Eobodotria	Gen. et sp. nov	Valid	Luque & Gerken	Late Cretaceous (Cenomanian–Turonian)		Colombia	A member of Cumacea. Genus includes new species E. muisca.	
Eocarpilius vicetinus	Sp. nov	Valid	Ceccon & De Angeli	Early Oligocene		Italy	A crab belonging to the group Carpilioidea and the family Carpiliidae.	
Eodorippe connori	Sp. nov	Valid	Nyborg et al.	Early Cretaceous (Albian)	Hudspeth Formation	United States	A crab belonging to the superfamily Dorippoidea and the family Telamonocarcinidae. Originally described as a species of Eodorippe, but subsequently transferred to the genus Personadorippe.	
Eopaguropsis grandis	Sp. nov	Valid	Fraaije et al.	Late Jurassic (Tithonian)	Ernstbrunn Limestone	Austria	A hermit crab belonging to the family Diogenidae.	
Eopaguropsis schindewolfi	Sp. nov	Valid	Fraaije et al.	Late Jurassic (Tithonian)	Ernstbrunn Limestone	Austria	A hermit crab belonging to the family Diogenidae.	
Eucalliax capsulasetaea	Sp. nov	Valid	Kiel et al.	Early Oligocene	Talara Basin	Peru	A member of the family Callianassidae.	
Eumunida veronensis	Sp. nov	Valid	Beschin, Busulini & Tessier in Beschin et al.	Eocene (Priabonian)		Italy	A member of the family Munididae. Originally described as a species of Eumunida, but subsequently transferred to the genus Muellermunida.	
Folguerolesia collinsi	Sp. nov	Valid	Beschin, Busulini & Tessier in Beschin et al.	Eocene (Priabonian)		Italy	A member of Leucosioidea belonging to the family Folguerolesiidae.	
?Galathea genesis	Sp. nov	Valid	Robins & Klompmaker	Late Jurassic	Ernstbrunn Limestone	Austria	A member of the family Galatheidae.	
Galatheites britmelanarum	Sp. nov	Valid	Robins & Klompmaker	Late Jurassic	Ernstbrunn Limestone	Austria	A member of Galatheoidea belonging to the family Catillogalatheidae.	
Gastrosacus raboeufi	Sp. nov	Valid	Fraaije et al.	Middle Jurassic (Bathonian)		France	A member of Galatheoidea.	
Glaessnerella yamoori	Sp. nov	Valid	Nyborg et al.	Early Cretaceous (Albian)	Hudspeth Formation	United States		
Glabropilumnus bizzarinii	Sp. nov	Valid	Beschin, Busulini & Tessier in Beschin et al.	Eocene (Priabonian)		Italy	A member of the family Pilumnidae.	
Glabropilumnus tuberculatus	Sp. nov	Valid	Ceccon & De Angeli	Early Oligocene		Italy	A crab belonging to the group Pilumnoidea and the family Pilumnidae.	
Gyroplanus	Gen. et sp. nov	Valid	Schweitzer et al.	Late Cretaceous		United States	A cyclodorippoid crab. Genus includes new species G. sapphirinus.	
Hepatiscus meneghinii	Sp. nov	Valid	Beschin, Busulini & Tessier in Beschin et al.	Eocene (Priabonian)		Italy	A member of the family Aethridae.	
Hinecaris	Gen. et sp. nov	Valid	Karasawa et al.	Late Cretaceous (Campanian–Maastrichtian)	Izumi Group	Japan	A member of the family Axiidae. The type species is H. simplex.	
Kromtitis lluisprietoi	Sp. nov	Valid	Ossó	Eocene (Lutetian)		Spain	A crab belonging to the family Dynomenidae.	
Lindahomola	Gen. et sp. nov	Valid	Garassino et al.	Late Cretaceous (Maastrichtian)	Peedee Formation	United States	A crab belonging to the family Homolidae. Genus includes new species L. longispina.	
Linuparus shacklefordae	Sp. nov	Valid	Schweitzer et al.	Late Cretaceous		United States	A palinurid lobster.	
Lophoranina lincki	Sp. nov	Valid	Feldmann, Schweitzer & Phillips	Oligocene		United States	A crab.	
Macroacaena hannya	Sp. nov	Valid	Ando, Kawano & Ugai	Eocene	Sakasegawa Formation	Japan	A crab belonging to the family Lyreididae.	
Maja prealpina	Sp. nov	Valid	Ceccon & De Angeli	Early Oligocene		Italy	A species of Maja.	
Matutites periosus	Sp. nov	Valid	Feldmann, Schweitzer & Phillips	Eocene		United States	A crab.	
Mesoparapylocheles strouhali	Sp. nov	Valid	Fraaije et al.	Late Jurassic (Tithonian)	Ernstbrunn Limestone	Austria	A hermit crab belonging to the family Parapylochelidae.	
Mesoparapylocheles zapfei	Sp. nov	Valid	Fraaije et al.	Late Jurassic (Tithonian)	Ernstbrunn Limestone	Austria	A hermit crab belonging to the family Parapylochelidae.	
Mesostylus pervesleri	Sp. nov	Valid	Hyžný & Summesberger	Late Cretaceous (Maastrichtian)	Piesting Formation	Austria	A member of the family Callianassidae.	
Montemagambrus	Gen. et sp. nov	Valid	Ceccon & De Angeli	Early Eocene		Italy	A crab belonging to the family Parthenopidae. Genus includes new species M. corallinus.	
Munidopsis salinaria	Sp. nov	Valid	Gašparič et al.	Miocene (Langhian)	Tuzla Basin	Bosnia and Herzegovina	A species of Munidopsis.	
Munitheites kuepperi	Sp. nov	Valid	Fraaije et al.	Late Jurassic (Tithonian)	Ernstbrunn Limestone	Austria	A hermit crab belonging to the family Schobertellidae.	
Nachioides	Gen. et sp. nov	Valid	Beschin, Busulini & Tessier in Beschin et al.	Eocene (Priabonian)		Italy	A member of the family Inachoididae. The type species is N. tuberculatus.	
Natatolana poblana	Sp. nov	Valid	Vega & Bruce in Vega et al.	Early Cretaceous (Valanginian-Hauterivian)	San Juan Raya Formation	Mexico	An isopod belonging to the family Cirolanidae.	
Nicolisia	Gen. et sp. nov	Valid	Beschin, Busulini & Tessier in Beschin et al.	Eocene (Priabonian)		Italy	A member of Xanthoidea belonging to the family Eumedonidae. The type species is N. antiqua.	
Notopus adinae	Sp. nov	Valid	Feldmann, Schweitzer & Phillips	Oligocene		United States	A crab, a species of Notopus.	
Ovalopus	Gen. et comb. nov	Valid	Robins & Klompmaker	Late Jurassic	Ernstbrunn Limestone	Austria; Czech Republic; Romania	A crab belonging to the group Homolodromioidea and to the family Jurellanidae. The type species is O. hoheneggeri (Moericke, 1889); genus also includes Coelopus convexus Schweitzer & Feldmann (2010) and Coelopus repandus Schweitzer & Feldmann (2010).	
Pachycheles bazzanii	Sp. nov	Valid	Beschin, Busulini & Tessier in Beschin et al.	Eocene (Priabonian)		Italy	A member of the family Porcellanidae.	
Pagurus haasei	Sp. nov	Valid	Polkowsky & Fraaije	Oligocene (Chattian)		Germany	A hermit crab, a species of Pagurus.	
Palaemon aestuarius	Sp. nov		Du et al.	Early Miocene	Mexican amber	Mexico	A species of Palaemon.	
Palaeopalinurus serratus	Sp. nov	Valid	Fraaije et al.	Early Cretaceous (Albian)	Basque-Cantabrian Basin	Spain	A spiny lobster.	
Palinurus? sauerweinorum	Sp. nov	Valid	Schweitzer et al.	Late Cretaceous		United States	A palinurid lobster.	
Panopeus santurbanensis	Sp. nov	Valid	Ceccon & De Angeli	Early Oligocene		Italy	A species of Panopeus.	
Paronachoides	Gen. et sp. nov	Valid	Beschin, Busulini & Tessier in Beschin et al.	Eocene (Priabonian)		Italy	A member of the family Inachoididae. The type species is P. scaber.	
Percnon santurbanensis	Sp. nov	Valid	Ceccon & de Angeli	Oligocene		Italy	A crab, a species of Percnon.	
Petrolisthes punctatus	Sp. nov	Valid	Beschin, Busulini & Tessier in Beschin et al.	Eocene (Priabonian)		Italy	A species of Petrolisthes.	
Pilumnopeus priscus	Sp. nov	Valid	Ceccon & De Angeli	Early Oligocene		Italy	A crab belonging to the group Pilumnoidea and the family Pilumnidae.	
Pilumnus pedemontanus	Sp. nov	Valid	Ceccon & De Angeli	Early Oligocene		Italy	A species of Pilumnus.	
Planoprosopon ogawaense	Sp. nov	Valid	Karasawa & Hirota	Late Jurassic–Early Cretaceous	Yatsuji Formation	Japan	A crab belonging to the group Homolodromioidea and to the family Longodromitidae.	
Planoprosopon sarumaru	Sp. nov	Valid	Karasawa & Hirota	Late Jurassic–Early Cretaceous	Yatsuji Formation	Japan	A crab belonging to the group Homolodromioidea and to the family Longodromitidae.	
Pretrizocheles	Gen. et sp. nov	Valid	Fraaije et al.	Late Jurassic (Tithonian)	Ernstbrunn Limestone	Austria	A hermit crab belonging to the family Pylochelidae. The type species is P. cocullo.	
Prolecythocaris rieberi	Sp. nov	Valid	Schweigert	Late Jurassic		Germany	A crab belonging to the group Dromiacea and to the family Lecythocaridae.	
Protopagurus	Gen. et sp. nov	Valid	Fraaije et al.	Late Jurassic (Tithonian)	Ernstbrunn Limestone	Austria	A hermit crab belonging to the family Paguridae. The type species is P. janoscheki.	
Pseudocarinocarcinoides	Gen. et sp. nov	Valid	Beschin, Busulini & Tessier in Beschin et al.	Eocene (Priabonian)		Italy	A member of Goneplacoidea belonging to the family Carinocarcinoididae. The type species is P. karasawai.	
Retropluma minuta	Sp. nov	Valid	Gašparič et al.	Miocene (Langhian)	Tuzla Basin	Bosnia and Herzegovina	A species of Retropluma.	
Ripleycarcinus	Gen. et sp. nov	Valid	Schweitzer et al.	Late Cretaceous		United States	A homoloid crab. Genus includes new species R. primaevus.	
Ripleycorystes	Gen. et sp. nov	Valid	Schweitzer et al.	Late Cretaceous		United States	A palaeocorystoid crab. Genus includes new species R. cardwelli.	
Symethoides danieli	Sp. nov	Valid	Schweitzer et al.	Late Cretaceous		United States	A raninoid crab.	
Tethysmunida setifera	Sp. nov	Valid	Beschin, Busulini & Tessier in Beschin et al.	Eocene (Priabonian)		Italy	A member of the family Munidopsidae.	
Tithopaguristes	Gen. et sp. nov	Valid	Fraaije et al.	Late Jurassic (Tithonian)	Ernstbrunn Limestone	Austria	A hermit crab belonging to the family Diogenidae. The type species is T. porosus.	
Tropidicarcinus	Gen. et 2 sp. nov	Valid	Schweitzer et al.	Late Cretaceous		United States	A dakoticancroid crab. Genus includes new species T. mcanallyae and T. starnesi.	
Ululapagurus oroszyi	Sp. nov	Valid	Fraaije et al.	Late Jurassic (Tithonian)	Ernstbrunn Limestone	Austria	A hermit crab belonging to the family Diogenidae.	
Vacuotheca	Gen. et sp. nov	Valid	Schädel, Perrichot & Haug	Late Cretaceous (Turonian)		France	A member of Isopoda belonging to the group Epicaridea. The type species is V. dupeorum.	
Valamunida	Gen. et sp. nov	Valid	Klompmaker & Robins in Hryniewicz et al.	Late Paleocene	Basilika Formation	Norway	A member of the family Munididae. The type species is V. haeggi.	
Verarena	Gen. et sp. nov	Valid	Beschin, Busulini & Tessier in Beschin et al.	Eocene (Priabonian)		Italy	A member of the family Euryplacidae. The type species is V. katoi.	
Vibrissalana	Gen. et sp. nov	Valid	Robins & Klompmaker	Late Jurassic	Ernstbrunn Limestone	Austria	A porcelain crab. Genus includes new species V. jurassica.	
Vicluvia	Gen. et sp. nov	Valid	Larghi et al.	Middle Triassic (Ladinian)	Meride Limestone	Italy; Switzerland	A member of Lophogastrida. Genus includes new species V. lombardoae.	

==== Ostracods ====
Name	Novelty	Status	Authors	Age	Type locality	Country	Notes	Images
Amicytheridea bilthanaensis	Sp. nov	Valid	Chaudhary & Nagori	Late Cretaceous	Bagh Formation	India		
Bairdiocypris fabiformis	Sp. nov	Valid	Melnikova	Late Ordovician	Delingde Formation	Russia		
Bairdoppilata dorsoarcuata	Sp. nov	Valid	Nogueira, Ramos & Hunt	Late Oligocene to early Miocene	Pirabas Formation	Brazil	A member of Podocopida belonging to the family Bairdiidae.	
Bairdoppilata pintoi	Sp. nov	Valid	Nogueira, Ramos & Hunt	Late Oligocene to early Miocene	La Rosa Formation; Pirabas Formation	Brazil; Venezuela	A member of Podocopida belonging to the family Bairdiidae.	
Bairdoppilata turonica	Sp. nov	Valid	Slipper	Late Cretaceous (Turonian)		United Kingdom		
Bairdoppilata vandenboldi	Sp. nov	Valid	Nogueira, Ramos & Hunt	Late Oligocene to early Miocene	Pirabas Formation	Brazil	A member of Podocopida belonging to the family Bairdiidae.	
Bakunella anae	Sp. nov	Valid	Spadi et al.	Late Miocene–Pliocene		Croatia	A member of the family Candonidae.	
Bassleratia torquata	Sp. nov	Valid	Melnikova	Late Ordovician	Delingde Formation	Russia		
Bolbozoe psittaca	Sp. nov	Valid	Perrier et al.	Silurian		United Kingdom	A member of Myodocopa.	
Boreobolbina morkokiana	Sp. nov	Valid	Melnikova	Late Ordovician	Delingde Formation	Russia		
Bradleya majorani	Sp. nov	Valid	Bergue, Brandão & Anjos Zerfass	Pleistocene		Atlantic Ocean (Rio Grande Rise)	A member of the family Thaerocytheridae.	
Bradleya ybate	Sp. nov	Valid	Bergue, Brandão & Anjos Zerfass	Late Miocene		Atlantic Ocean (Rio Grande Rise)	A member of the family Thaerocytheridae.	
Bythocypris wangi	Sp. nov	Valid	Tanaka, Siveter & Williams	Devonian	Fukuji Formation	Japan		
Bythoceratina? asulcata	Sp. nov	Valid	Nogueira, Ramos & Hunt	Early Miocene	Pirabas Formation	Brazil	A member of Podocopida belonging to the family Bythocytheridae.	
Bythoceratina? sinuocostata	Sp. nov	Valid	Nogueira, Ramos & Hunt	Late Oligocene to early Miocene	Pirabas Formation	Brazil	A member of Podocopida belonging to the family Bythocytheridae.	
Cardobairdia longitecta	Sp. nov	Valid	Slipper	Late Cretaceous (Turonian)		United Kingdom		
Carinobairdia cabralae	Sp. nov		Forel in Forel, Thuy & Wisshak	Late Triassic (Carnian)	Maantang Formation	China	A member of the family Bairdiidae.	
Cativella primaveraensis	Sp. nov	Valid	Nogueira, Ramos & Hunt	Early Miocene	Pirabas Formation	Brazil	A member of Podocopida belonging to the family Trachyleberididae.	
Clavofabellina fukujiensis	Sp. nov	Valid	Tanaka, Siveter & Williams	Devonian	Fukuji Formation	Japan		
Clintiella antifrigga	Sp. nov	Valid	Siveter et al.	Silurian	Hitoegane Formation	Japan	A beyrichioid palaeocopid ostracod.	
Coelochilina reticulata	Sp. nov	Valid	Melnikova	Late Ordovician	Delingde Formation	Russia		
Costa spinaventralis	Sp. nov	Valid	Nogueira, Ramos & Hunt	Early Miocene	Pirabas Formation	Brazil	A member of Podocopida belonging to the family Trachyleberididae.	
Curfsina coarctata	Sp. nov	Valid	Chaudhary & Nagori	Late Cretaceous	Bagh Formation	India		
Curfsina hanumanpuraensis	Sp. nov	Valid	Chaudhary & Nagori	Late Cretaceous	Bagh Formation	India		
Cushmanidea? bragantinaensis	Sp. nov	Valid	Nogueira, Ramos & Hunt	Late Oligocene to early Miocene	Pirabas Formation	Brazil	A member of Podocopida belonging to the family Cushmanideidae.	
Cyprideis? carmoi	Sp. nov	Valid	Nogueira, Ramos & Hunt	Late Oligocene to early Miocene	Pirabas Formation	Brazil	A member of Podocopida belonging to the family Cytherideidae.	
Cytherella altacaelateralis	Sp. nov	Valid	Nogueira, Ramos & Hunt	Late Oligocene to early Miocene	Pirabas Formation	Brazil	A member of the family Cytherellidae.	
Cytherella kempfi	Sp. nov	Valid	Nogueira, Ramos & Hunt	Late Oligocene to early Miocene	Pirabas Formation	Brazil	A member of the family Cytherellidae.	
Cytherella notossinuosa	Sp. nov	Valid	Nogueira, Ramos & Hunt	Late Oligocene to early Miocene	Pirabas Formation	Brazil	A member of the family Cytherellidae.	
Cytherella truncatoides	Sp. nov	Valid	Slipper	Late Cretaceous (Turonian)		United Kingdom		
Cytherella vulna	Sp. nov	Valid	Slipper	Late Cretaceous (Turonian)		United Kingdom		
Cytherella weaveri	Sp. nov	Valid	Slipper	Late Cretaceous (Turonian)		United Kingdom		
Cytherelloidea colini	Sp. nov	Valid	Nogueira, Ramos & Hunt	Early Miocene	Pirabas Formation	Brazil	A member of the family Cytherellidae.	
Cytherelloidea cumpassorobusta	Sp. nov	Valid	Nogueira, Ramos & Hunt	Early Miocene	Pirabas Formation	Brazil	A member of the family Cytherellidae.	
Cytherelloidea granulosa parca	Subsp. nov	Valid	Slipper	Late Cretaceous (Turonian)		United Kingdom		
Cytherelloidea mediocythara	Sp. nov	Valid	Nogueira, Ramos & Hunt	Early Miocene	Pirabas Formation	Brazil	A member of the family Cytherellidae.	
Cytherelloidea quasilenisa	Sp. nov	Valid	Nogueira, Ramos & Hunt	Early Miocene	Pirabas Formation	Brazil	A member of the family Cytherellidae.	
Cytheretta fortiscostata	Sp. nov	Valid	Nogueira, Ramos & Hunt	Early Miocene	Pirabas Formation	Brazil	A member of Podocopida belonging to the family Cytherettidae.	
Cytheretta petrii	Sp. nov	Valid	Nogueira, Ramos & Hunt	Early Miocene	Pirabas Formation	Brazil	A member of Podocopida belonging to the family Cytherettidae.	
Cytheropteron hanumanpuraensis	Sp. nov	Valid	Chaudhary & Nagori	Late Cretaceous	Bagh Formation	India		
Cytheropteron ratitalaiensis	Sp. nov	Valid	Chaudhary & Nagori	Late Cretaceous	Bagh Formation	India		
Cytherura? ornatareticulum	Sp. nov	Valid	Nogueira, Ramos & Hunt	Early Miocene	Pirabas Formation	Brazil	A member of Podocopida belonging to the family Cytheruridae.	
Cytherura? punctocentrata	Sp. nov	Valid	Nogueira, Ramos & Hunt	Early Miocene	Pirabas Formation	Brazil	A member of Podocopida belonging to the family Cytheruridae.	
Cytherura? quasilenisa	Sp. nov	Valid	Nogueira, Ramos & Hunt	Late Oligocene to early Miocene	Pirabas Formation	Brazil	A member of Podocopida belonging to the family Cytheruridae.	
Eocytheropteron bilthanaensis	Sp. nov	Valid	Chaudhary & Nagori	Late Cretaceous	Bagh Formation	India		
Gibbosocythere	Gen. et 2 sp. nov	Valid	Karpuk, Whatley & Maybury	Early Cretaceous		Crimean Peninsula	A member of Paradoxostomatidae. Genus includes new species G. ferelevis and G. cellulata.	
Hemicytherura bradyisimilis	Sp. nov	Valid	Nogueira, Ramos & Hunt	Early Miocene	Pirabas Formation	Brazil	A member of Podocopida belonging to the family Cytheruridae.	
Hiatobairdia senegasi	Sp. nov		Forel in Forel, Thuy & Wisshak	Late Triassic (Carnian and Norian)	Kuahongdong Formation; Maantang Formation	China	A member of the family Bairdiidae.	
Hiatobairdia zhengshuyingi	Sp. nov		Forel in Forel, Thuy & Wisshak	Late Triassic (Carnian and Norian)	Kuahongdong Formation; Maantang Formation	China	A member of the family Bairdiidae.	
Hollinella orienta	Sp. nov	Valid	Siveter et al.	Silurian	Gionyama Formation	Japan	A hollinoid palaeocopid ostracod.	
Hulingsina? lorenesmithae	Sp. nov	Valid	Nogueira, Ramos & Hunt	Early Miocene	Pirabas Formation	Brazil	A member of Podocopida belonging to the family Cushmanideidae.	
Hulingsina reticulorugosa	Sp. nov	Valid	Nogueira, Ramos & Hunt	Late Oligocene to early Miocene	Pirabas Formation	Brazil	A member of Podocopida belonging to the family Cushmanideidae.	
Hungarella gommerii	Sp. nov		Forel in Forel, Thuy & Wisshak	Late Triassic (Carnian)	Maantang Formation	China	A member of the family Healdiidae.	
Jatella ampla	Sp. nov	Valid	Melnikova	Late Ordovician	Delingde Formation	Russia		
Krithe araucoensis	Sp. nov	Valid	Bergue, Coimbra & Finger	Early Miocene		Chile		
Krithe dawnpetersonae	Sp. nov	Valid	Bergue, Coimbra & Finger	Early Miocene		Chile		
Krithe nerudai	Sp. nov	Valid	Bergue, Coimbra & Finger	Early Miocene		Chile		
Leperditella paula	Sp. nov	Valid	Melnikova	Late Ordovician	Delingde Formation	Russia		
Loxoconcha corpulenta	Sp. nov	Valid	Nogueira, Ramos & Hunt	Early Miocene	Pirabas Formation	Brazil	A member of Podocopida belonging to the family Loxoconchidae.	
Microcythere acuminata	Sp. nov	Valid	Bergue, Brandão & Anjos Zerfass	Quaternary		Atlantic Ocean (Rio Grande Rise)	A member of the family Microcytheridae.	
Moierina grata	Sp. nov	Valid	Melnikova	Late Ordovician	Delingde Formation	Russia		
Mydionobairdia cauladelicata	Sp. nov	Valid	Nogueira, Ramos & Hunt	Early Miocene	Pirabas Formation	Brazil	A member of Podocopida belonging to the family Bairdiidae.	
Nigeroloxoconcha baghensis	Sp. nov	Valid	Chaudhary & Nagori	Late Cretaceous	Bagh Formation	India		
Nigeroloxoconcha diluta	Sp. nov	Valid	Chaudhary & Nagori	Late Cretaceous	Bagh Formation	India		
Nudator	Gen. et 4 sp. nov	Valid	Perrier et al.	Silurian (Wenlock and Ludlow)		Poland; United Kingdom; France?	A member of Myodocopa belonging to the family Entomozoidae. The type species is N. inflatus; genus also includes new species N. angiportatus, N. artumatus and N. elegantulus.	
Ochesaarina aculeata	Sp. nov	Valid	Melnikova	Late Ordovician	Delingde Formation	Russia		
Oculparva	Gen. et sp. nov	Valid	Perrier et al.	Silurian		United Kingdom	A member of Myodocopa. Genus includes new species O. moncola.	
Ovocytheridea baghensis	Sp. nov	Valid	Chaudhary & Nagori	Late Cretaceous	Bagh Formation	India		
Paijenborchella jeerabadensis	Sp. nov	Valid	Chaudhary & Nagori	Late Cretaceous	Bagh Formation	India		
Pauproles	Gen. et sp. nov	Valid	Siveter et al.	Silurian	Hitoegane Formation	Japan	A eurychilinoid palaeocopid ostracod. Genus includes new species P. supparata.	
Piscarista	Gen. et sp. nov	Valid	Perrier et al.	Silurian		United Kingdom	A member of Myodocopa. Genus includes new species P. sagenata.	
Planiglandites	Gen. et sp. nov	Valid	Melnikova	Late Ordovician	Delingde Formation	Russia	Genus includes new species P. mirabilis.	
Pontocyprella goussardi	Sp. nov		Forel in Forel, Thuy & Wisshak	Late Triassic (Carnian)	Maantang Formation	China	A member of the family Pontocyprididae.	
Pontocyprella robusta cometa	Subsp. nov	Valid	Slipper	Late Cretaceous (Turonian)		United Kingdom		
Pontocypris aguilerai	Sp. nov	Valid	Nogueira, Ramos & Hunt	Late Oligocene to early Miocene	Pirabas Formation	Brazil	A member of Podocopida belonging to the family Pontocypridae.	
Pseudotethysia	Gen. et sp. nov	Valid	Karpuk, Whatley & Maybury	Early Cretaceous		Crimean Peninsula	A member of Cytheruridae. Genus includes new species P. reticulata.	
Quadracythere adornata	Sp. nov	Valid	Nogueira, Ramos & Hunt	Early Miocene	Pirabas Formation	Brazil	A member of Podocopida belonging to the family Hemicytheridae.	
Quadracythere fortisrobusta	Sp. nov	Valid	Nogueira, Ramos & Hunt	Early Miocene	Pirabas Formation	Brazil	A member of Podocopida belonging to the family Hemicytheridae.	
Quadracythere limbimodesta	Sp. nov	Valid	Nogueira, Ramos & Hunt	Early Miocene	Pirabas Formation	Brazil	A member of Podocopida belonging to the family Hemicytheridae.	
Rectella cistelliformis	Sp. nov	Valid	Melnikova	Late Ordovician	Delingde Formation	Russia		
Retiprimites alveolatus	Sp. nov	Valid	Melnikova	Late Ordovician	Delingde Formation	Russia		
Retiprimites mirandus	Sp. nov	Valid	Melnikova	Late Ordovician	Delingde Formation	Russia		
Rostrocytheridea decurtata	Sp. nov	Valid	Chaudhary, Nagori & Khosla	Late Cretaceous	Bagh Formation	India	A member of the family Cytherideidae.	
Rostrocytheridea divergens	Sp. nov	Valid	Chaudhary, Nagori & Khosla	Late Cretaceous	Bagh Formation	India	A member of the family Cytherideidae.	
Semicytherura? fortisreticulata	Sp. nov	Valid	Nogueira, Ramos & Hunt	Early Miocene	Pirabas Formation	Brazil	A member of Podocopida belonging to the family Cytheruridae.	
Seminova	Gen. et comb. nov	Valid	Perrier et al.	Silurian		United Kingdom	A member of Myodocopa belonging to the superfamily Bolbozoidea. The type species is "Entomis" depressa Jones (1884).	
Tenedocythere? rugosocostata	Sp. nov	Valid	Nogueira, Ramos & Hunt	Early Miocene	Pirabas Formation	Brazil	A member of Podocopida belonging to the family Hemicytheridae.	
Touroconcha ishizakii	Sp. nov	Valid	Nogueira, Ramos & Hunt	Early Miocene	Pirabas Formation	Brazil	A member of Podocopida belonging to the family Loxoconchidae.	
Uthoernia sibirica	Sp. nov	Valid	Melnikova	Late Ordovician	Delingde Formation	Russia		

==== Other crustaceans ====
Name	Novelty	Status	Authors	Age	Type locality	Country	Notes	Images
Austromegabalanus carrioli	Sp. nov	Valid	Collareta et al.	Early Miocene	Chilcatay Formation	Peru	A barnacle.	
Calmanostraca hassbergella	Sp. nov		Wagner, Hauh & Haug	Late Triassic (Carnian)	Hassberge Formation	Germany	A member of Branchiopoda belonging to the group Calmanostraca.	
Cretiscalpellum matrioni	Sp. nov	Valid	Gale	Early Cretaceous (Albian)		France	A barnacle. Originally described as a species of Cretiscalpellum; Gale (2020) transferred it to the genus Witherscalpellum.	
Cretiscalpellum mutterlosei	Sp. nov	Valid	Gale	Early Cretaceous (Hauterivian)		Germany	A barnacle.	
Halicyne oosterinkorum	Sp. nov	Valid	Schweitzer, Feldmann & Schinker	Middle Triassic (Anisian)		Netherlands	A member of Cyclida.	
Jaegerscalpellum	Gen. et sp. et comb. nov	Valid	Gale	Early Cretaceous (Hauterivian to Albian)		Germany	A barnacle. Genus includes new species J. elegans, as well as J. comptum (Withers, 1910) and J. politum (Darwin, 1851).	
Liapora	Gen. et sp. nov	Valid	Keupp	Early Jurassic (Pliensbachian)		Germany	Originally described as a scyphozoan polyp; genus includes new species L. neubigi. Gale, Keupp & Schweigert (2022) reinterpreted it as capitular valves of a phosphatic barnacle that had been described as Pollicipes(?) lotharingica by Méchin in 1901.	
Martillepas auriculum	Sp. nov	Valid	Gale	Early Cretaceous (Hauterivian)		Germany	A barnacle.	
Martillepas decoratus	Sp. nov	Valid	Gale	Early Cretaceous (Hauterivian)		Germany	A barnacle.	
Notostraca oleseni	Sp. nov		Wagner, Hauh & Haug	Early Cretaceous	Yixian Formation	China	A member of Branchiopoda belonging to the group Notostraca.	
Paraleptestheria mitchelli	Sp. nov	Valid	Gallego et al.	Late Eocene		United Kingdom	A clam shrimp.	
Pedupycnolepas pulcher	Sp. nov	Valid	Gale	Early Cretaceous (Hauterivian)		Germany	A barnacle.	
Pemphilimnadiopsis cheni	Sp. nov	Valid	Liao et al.	Carboniferous (Pennsylvanian)	Benxi Formation	China	A clam shrimp.	
Perumegabalanus	Gen. et sp. nov	Valid	Coletti et al.	Miocene (Burdigalian)	Chilcatay Formation	Peru	A barnacle. Genus includes new species P. calziai.	
Platylepas mediterranea	Sp. nov	Valid	Collareta et al.	Early Pleistocene (Gelasian)		Italy	A barnacle, a species of Platylepas.	
Prolatcyclus	Gen. et comb. et sp. nov	Valid	Mychko et al.	Carboniferous (Viséan)		Russia; United Kingdom	A member of Cyclida. Genus includes P. martinensis (Goldring, 1967) and a new species P. kindzadza.	
Verruca alabamensis	Sp. nov	Valid	Perreault & Buckeridge	Paleogene	Yazoo Formation	United States	A barnacle belonging to the family Verrucidae.	
Verruca gailgoedertae	Sp. nov	Valid	Perreault & Buckeridge	Middle Eocene		United States	A barnacle belonging to the family Verrucidae.	
Verruca sorrellae	Sp. nov	Valid	Perreault & Buckeridge	Late Eocene to earliest Oligocene		United States	A barnacle belonging to the family Verrucidae.	

== Trilobites ==
=== Research ===
- A study on the rates of evolution of trilobites in the Cambrian is published by Paterson, Edgecombe & Lee (2019), who interpret their findings as indicative of Cambrian rather than Precambrian origin of trilobites, and as indicating that the Cambrian explosion had already largely concluded by the time the typical Cambrian fossil record begins (≈521 Ma).
- A study on repaired injuries in trilobite specimens from the Cambrian Ruin Wash Lagerstätte (Nevada, United States) is published by Pates & Bicknell (2019), who interpret their findings as indicative of species specific predation on Cambrian trilobites, and of enlarged spines in some trilobite species serving as possible predation deterrents.
- A study on the morphology and ontogeny of Changaspis elongata, based on data from specimens from the Lazizhai section of the Balang Formation (Cambrian Stage 4; Guizhou, China), is published by Du et al. (2019).
- A cluster of over 100 juvenile trilobites belonging to the genus Aphelaspis is reported from the Cambrian (Paibian) Conasauga Formation (Georgia, United States) by Schwimmer & Montante (2019).
- A study on patterns of occupancy and diversity trajectories in late Cambrian-early Ordovician trilobite communities from the Argentine Cordillera Oriental is published by Serra, Balseiro & Waisfeld (2019).
- A study on the phylogenetic relationships of members of the family Olenidae is published by Monti & Confalonieri (2019).
- A study on the phylogenetic relationships of members of the olenid subfamily Balnibarbiinae is published by Hopkins (2019).
- Nine specimens of Symphysurus ebbestadi preserving all key stages of the exoskeleton moulting process are described from the Lower Ordovician Fezouata Formation (Morocco) by Drage et al. (2019).
- A study on clusters of Ampyx priscus from the Ordovician Fezouata Shale of Morocco is published by Vannier et al. (2019), who interpret these clusters as evidence of a collective behaviour rather than a result of passive transportation and accumulation.
- A study on the phylogenetic relationships of the species and subspecies assigned to the phacopid genus Austerops is published by Oudot et al. (2019).
- A study on the morphological changes in the ontogeny of the Ordovician phacopid trilobite Calyptaulax strasburgensis is published by Jacobs & Carlucci (2019).
- A well-preserved body cluster of 18 specimens of Arctinurus boltoni is described from the Silurian Rochester Shale (New York, United States) by Bicknell, Paterson & Hopkins (2019).
- A study on development and evolution of the cephalon and the pygidium in phacopid trilobites is published by Oudot et al. (2019).
- A study on the internal structures of eyes of trilobites belonging to the genera Asaphus and Archegonus is published by Scholtz, Staude & Dunlop (2019); the study is subsequently criticized by Schoenemann & Clarkson (2021).
- A study on the variability of trilobite moulting behaviour is published by Drage (2019).

=== New taxa ===
Name	Novelty	Status	Authors	Age	Type locality	Country	Notes	Images
Anacaenaspis yanpingensis	Sp. nov	Valid	Wei & Zhan	Silurian (Rhuddanian)	Niuchang Formation	China		
Asaphellus intermedius	Sp. nov	Valid	Ghobadi Pour	Ordovician		Iran		
Asteropyge boeckae	Sp. nov	Valid	Van Viersen, Taghon & Magrean	Devonian (Eifelian)	Jemelle Formation	Belgium		
Asteropyge eonia	Sp. nov	Valid	Van Viersen, Taghon & Magrean	Devonian (Eifelian)	Jemelle Formation	France		
Asteropyge filoxenia	Sp. nov	Valid	Van Viersen, Taghon & Magrean	Devonian (Eifelian)	Jemelle Formation	Belgium		
Astycoryphe rugocauda	Sp. nov	Valid	Van Viersen, Taghon & Magrean	Devonian (Eifelian)	Couvin Formation	Belgium	A member of Proetida.	
Astycoryphe tureki	Sp. nov	Valid	Mergl & Budil	Devonian (Eifelian)		Czech Republic	A member of Proetida.	
Bigotina kelleri	Sp. nov	Valid	Geyer	Cambrian Stage 3	Igoudine Formation	Morocco	A member of Redlichiina belonging to the family Bigotinidae.	
Bigotina monningeri	Sp. nov	Valid	Geyer	Cambrian		Morocco	A member of Redlichiina belonging to the family Bigotinidae.	
Bigotinops chouberti	Sp. nov	Valid	Geyer	Cambrian		Morocco	A member of Redlichiina belonging to the family Bigotinidae.	
Brachymetopus (Conimetopus) alekseevi	Sp. nov	Valid	Mychko in Mychko & Savchuk	Early Permian		Russia		
Brevibole minerva	Sp. nov	Valid	Müller & Hahn	Carboniferous (Mississippian)		Germany	A member of the family Phillipsiidae belonging to the subfamily Achegoninae.	
Bronteopsis tenuirhachis	Sp. nov	Valid	Ove, Ebbestad & Fortey	Late Ordovician	Povorotnaya Formation	Russia	A member of the family Styginidae.	
Calymene dastanpouri	Sp. nov	Valid	Ameri, Arjmandzadeh & Ghoorcgi	Early Silurian	Niur Formation	Iran	Announced in 2019; the final version of the article naming was published in 2021.	
Carbonoproetus bellona	Sp. nov	Valid	Müller & Hahn	Carboniferous (Mississippian)		Germany	A member of the family Phillipsiidae belonging to the subfamily Bollandiinae.	
Carbonoproetus volturnus	Sp. nov	Valid	Müller & Hahn	Carboniferous (Mississippian)		Germany	A member of the family Phillipsiidae belonging to the subfamily Bollandiinae.	
Conophrys multituberculatus	Sp. nov	Valid	Ghobadi Pour	Ordovician		Iran		
Cyphaspides ammari	Sp. nov	Valid	Chatterton, Gibb & McKellar	Devonian (Eifelian)	Bou Tchrafine Group	Morocco	A member of Proetida belonging to the family Aulacopleuridae.	
Cyphaspides nicoleae	Sp. nov	Valid	Chatterton, Gibb & McKellar	Devonian (Eifelian)	Bou Tchrafine Group	Morocco	A member of Proetida belonging to the family Aulacopleuridae.	
Cyphaspides pankowskiorum	Sp. nov	Valid	Chatterton, Gibb & McKellar	Devonian (Eifelian)	Bou Tchrafine Group	Morocco	A member of Proetida belonging to the family Aulacopleuridae.	
Cyphaspis insolata	Sp. nov	Valid	Van Viersen, Taghon & Magrean	Devonian (Eifelian)	Jemelle Formation	Belgium		
Cyphaspis iuxta	Sp. nov	Valid	Van Viersen, Taghon & Magrean	Devonian (Eifelian)	Jemelle Formation	Belgium		
Cyphaspis konstantini	Sp. nov	Valid	Alberti	Devonian (Emsian)		Germany	A member of the family Aulacopleuridae.	
Cyrtoproetus korni	Sp. nov	Valid	Müller & Hahn	Carboniferous (Mississippian)		Germany	A member of the family Phillipsiidae belonging to the subfamily Achegoninae.	
Cyrtoproetus roesenbeckensis	Sp. nov	Valid	Müller & Hahn	Carboniferous (Mississippian)		Germany	A member of the family Phillipsiidae belonging to the subfamily Achegoninae.	
Cyrtosymbolinella	Gen. et sp. nov	Valid	Basse & Lemke	Devonian		Germany	A member of the family Phillipsiidae belonging to the subfamily Cyrtosymbolinae. The type species is C. svojtkai.	
Debrenella	Gen. et sp. nov	Valid	Geyer	Cambrian		Morocco	A member of Redlichiida belonging to the family Fallotaspididae. Genus includes new species D. larvalis.	
Diademaproetus pertinax	Sp. nov	Valid	Van Viersen, Taghon & Magrean	Devonian (Eifelian)	Jemelle Formation	Belgium	A member of Proetida.	
Dionide trigintasegmentata	Sp. nov	Valid	Ove, Ebbestad & Fortey	Late Ordovician	Barkov Formation	Russia	A member of Asaphida belonging to the family Dionididae.	
Eladiolinania	Gen. et 2 sp. et comb. nov	Valid	Geyer	Cambrian	Igoudine Formation	Morocco; Spain?	A member of Redlichiina belonging to the family Bigotinidae. Genus includes new species E. castor and E. pollux, and possibly also "Serrania" palaciosi Liñán et al. (2008) and "Serrania" gordaensis Liñán et al. (2008).	
Evenkaspis (Bilobaspis) mirabilis	Subgen. et sp. nov	Valid	Ove, Ebbestad & Fortey	Late Ordovician	Tolmachev Formation	Russia	A member of the family Pterygometopidae.	
Failleana superba	Sp. nov	Valid	Ove, Ebbestad & Fortey	Late Ordovician	Povorotnaya Formation	Russia	A member of the family Styginidae.	
Fallotaspis antecedens	Sp. nov	Valid	Geyer	Cambrian	Igoudine Formation	Morocco	A member of Redlichiida belonging to the family Fallotaspididae.	
Geesops icovellaunae	Sp. nov	Valid	Van Viersen, Taghon & Magrean	Devonian (Eifelian)	Jemelle Formation	Belgium		
Gerastos kesselaeri	Sp. nov	Valid	Van Viersen, Taghon & Magrean	Devonian (Eifelian)	Jemelle Formation	Belgium		
Gerastos silvicultrix	Sp. nov	Valid	Van Viersen, Taghon & Magrean	Devonian (Emsian)	Heisdorf Formation	Germany		
Heliopeltis morrisoni	Sp. nov	Valid	Basse, Müller & Habenicht	Devonian (Emsian)		Germany	A member of the family Scutelluidae belonging to the subfamily Kolihapeltinae.	
Hollandiella	Gen. et 3 sp. nov	Valid	Van Viersen & Lerouge	Devonian (Pragian and Emsian)	Ihandar Formation; Timrhanrhart Formation	Morocco	A member of the family Proetidae belonging to the subfamily Cornuproetinae. The type species is H. curvirostris; genus also includes new species H. lebruni and H. verecunda.	
Interproetus mizobuchii	Sp. nov	Valid	Stocker et al.	Paleozoic		Japan	A member of Proetida belonging to the family Proetidae.	
Issendalenia	Gen. et sp. nov	Valid	Geyer	Cambrian	Igoudine Formation	Morocco	A member of Redlichiina belonging to the family Bigotinidae. Genus includes new species I. grandispina.	
Kasachstania alperovichi	Sp. nov	Valid	Ghobadi Pour et al.	Devonian (Lochkovian)	Shakshagaily Formation	Kazakhstan		
Kellerwaldops	Gen. et sp. nov	Valid	Basse & Lemke	Devonian		Germany	A member of the family Phacopidae belonging to the subfamily Phacopinae. The type species is K. kaufmanni.	
Kettneraspis eftychia	Sp. nov	Valid	Van Viersen, Taghon & Magrean	Devonian (Eifelian)	Jemelle Formation	France	A member of the family Odontopleuridae.	
Koneprusia chimaera	Sp. nov	Valid	Alberti	Devonian (Emsian)		Germany	A member of the family Odontopleuridae.	
Koneprusites oresibios	Sp. nov	Valid	Van Viersen & Lerouge	Devonian (Eifelian)		Morocco	A member of the family Proetidae belonging to the subfamily Cornuproetinae.	
Lepidoproetus arenicolus	Sp. nov	Valid	Van Viersen & Lerouge	Devonian (Pragian)		Morocco	A member of the family Proetidae belonging to the subfamily Cornuproetinae.	
Liobole (Liobole) aurora	Sp. nov	Valid	Müller & Hahn	Carboniferous (Mississippian)		Germany	A member of the family Phillipsiidae belonging to the subfamily Achegoninae.	
Liobole (Panibole) neptun	Sp. nov	Valid	Müller & Hahn	Carboniferous (Mississippian)		Germany	A member of the family Phillipsiidae belonging to the subfamily Achegoninae.	
Nephranops (Maternia)	Subgen. et sp. nov	Valid	Feist	Devonian (Famennian)		France; Germany	A member of Phacopida. The type species of the subgenus is "Nephranops incisus" dillanus Richter & Richter (1926) (raised to the rank of a separate species Nephranops (Maternia) dillanus); the subgenus also includes Nephranops franconicus Alberti (1970) and a new species Nephranops (Maternia) occitanicus.	
Nephranops (Nephranops) angerae	Sp. nov	Valid	Feist	Devonian (Famennian)		France	A member of Phacopida.	
Niobe (Niobella) obscura	Sp. nov	Valid	Zhou & Zhou	Ordovician	Dawan Formation	China	A member of the family Asaphidae belonging to the subfamily Isotelinae. Originally described as a species of Niobe, but subsequently transferred to the genus Zhiyia.	
Paralejurus colossicus	Sp. nov	Valid	Alberti	Devonian (Emsian)		Germany	A member of the family Scutelluidae.	
Paralejurus flickorum	Sp. nov	Valid	Alberti	Devonian (Emsian)		Germany	A member of the family Scutelluidae.	
Pararemopleurides ornatissimus	Sp. nov	Valid	Ove, Ebbestad & Fortey	Late Ordovician	Povorotnaya Formation	Russia	A member of Asaphida belonging to the family Remopleurididae.	
Pedinopariops ceuthonymus	Sp. nov	Valid	Van Viersen, Taghon & Magrean	Devonian (Eifelian)	Jemelle Formation	France	A member of the family Phacopidae.	
Pedinopariops richterianus geminus	Subsp. nov	Valid	Van Viersen, Taghon & Magrean	Devonian (Eifelian)	Jemelle Formation	Belgium	A member of the family Phacopidae.	
Placoparia africana	Sp. nov	In press	Pereira & Gutiérrez-Marco in Gutiérrez-Marco et al.	Ordovician (Sandbian)		Morocco	Announced in 2019; the final version of the article naming it is not published yet.	
Polypleuraspidella	Gen. et comb. nov	Valid	Peel	Cambrian	Spence Shale	United States (Utah)	A new genus for "Polypleuraspis" cooperi Robison & Babcock (2011).	
Polypleuraspis glacialis	Sp. nov	Valid	Peel	Cambrian (Miaolingian)	Telt Bugt Formation	Greenland		
Pseudobigotina	Gen. et sp. nov	Valid	Geyer	Cambrian		Morocco	A member of Redlichiina belonging to the family Bigotinidae. Genus includes new species P. antiatlasensis.	
Pulvinocephalus	Gen. et comb. et 2 sp. et subsp. nov	Valid	Feist	Devonian (Famennian)		Germany; Russia	A member of Phacopida. The type species is "Phacops (Trimerocephalus)" steinachensis Richter & Richter (1926) (including a new subspecies Pulvinocephalus steinachensis triangulus); genus also includes "Phacops (Cryphops)" latilimbatus Maximova (1955) and new species Pulvinocephalus ovatus and Pulvinocephalus walliseri.	
Radiaspis taghonorum	Sp. nov	Valid	Van Viersen & Magrean	Middle Devonian	Hanonet Formation	Belgium	A member of the family Odontopleuridae.	
Raymondella plastron	Sp. nov	Valid	Ove, Ebbestad & Fortey	Late Ordovician	Povorotnaya Formation	Russia	A member of the family Raphiophoridae.	
Redlichia rex	Sp. nov	Valid	Holmes, Paterson & García-Bellido	Cambrian Stage 4	Emu Bay Shale	Australia		
Robergia nikolaiseni	Sp. nov	Valid	Ove, Ebbestad & Fortey	Late Ordovician	Barkov Formation	Russia	A member of Asaphida belonging to the family Remopleurididae.	
Robergia subtilis	Sp. nov	Valid	Ove, Ebbestad & Fortey	Late Ordovician	Povorotnaya Formation	Russia	A member of Asaphida belonging to the family Remopleurididae.	
Scabriscutellum archinalae	Sp. nov	Valid	Van Viersen, Taghon & Magrean	Devonian (Eifelian)	Jemelle Formation	Belgium	A member of the family Scutelluidae.	
Sculptoproetus raki	Sp. nov	Valid	Van Viersen & Lerouge	Devonian (Emsian)		Morocco	A member of the family Proetidae belonging to the subfamily Cornuproetinae.	
Septimopeltis akatastasia	Sp. nov	Valid	Van Viersen, Taghon & Magrean	Devonian (Eifelian)	Jemelle Formation	Belgium	A member of the family Scutelluidae.	
Struveops wiedaensis	Sp. nov	Valid	Feist	Devonian (Famennian)		Germany	A member of Phacopida.	
Suvorovaella	Gen. et comb. nov	Valid	Geyer	Cambrian	El'gyan Formation	Russia	A member of Redlichiina belonging to the family Bigotinidae. The type species is "Bigotinops" privus Suvorova (1960); genus might also include "Bigotinops" patrius Suvorova (1960).	
Symphysurus ebbestadi	Sp. nov	Valid	Gutierrez-Marco, Rabano & Garcia-Bellido	Ordovician (Tremadocian)		Morocco	A member of the family Nileidae.	
Tafilaltaspis rufa	Sp. nov	Valid	Van Viersen & Lerouge	Devonian (Eifelian)		Morocco	A member of the family Proetidae belonging to the subfamily Eremiproetinae.	
Tesselacauda kriegerae	Sp. nov	Valid	Adrain & Karim	Early Ordovician	Fillmore Formation; Garden City Formation	United States		
Tesselacauda morrisoni	Sp. nov	Valid	Adrain & Karim	Early Ordovician	Fillmore Formation	United States		
Timsaloproetus gibbae	Sp. nov	Valid	Van Viersen & Lerouge	Devonian (Emsian)	Khebchia Formation	Morocco	A member of the family Proetidae belonging to the subfamily Cornuproetinae.	
Timsaloproetus pulchistriatus	Sp. nov	Valid	Van Viersen & Lerouge	Devonian (Emsian)	Timrhanrhart Formation	Morocco	A member of the family Proetidae belonging to the subfamily Cornuproetinae.	
Timsaloproetus weddigei	Sp. nov	Valid	Van Viersen & Lerouge	Devonian (Eifelian)	Bicken-Ense Formation	Germany	A member of the family Proetidae belonging to the subfamily Cornuproetinae.	
Tioutella	Gen. et sp. nov	Valid	Geyer	Cambrian	Igoudine Formation	Morocco	A member of Redlichiina belonging to the family Bigotinidae. Genus includes new species T. floccofavosa.	
Trifoliops septimanicus	Sp. nov	Valid	Feist	Devonian (Famennian)		France	A member of Phacopida.	
Tropidocoryphe insciens	Sp. nov	Valid	Van Viersen, Taghon & Magrean	Devonian (Eifelian)	Jemelle Formation	Belgium	A member of Proetida.	

== Other arthropods ==
=== Research ===
- A study on the morphology of appendages of the euarthropod Ercaicunia multinodosa from the Early Cambrian Chengjiang biota (China) is published by Zhai et al. (2019).
- Description of the appendicular morphology of Sinoburius lunaris is published by Chen et al. (2019).
- Description of a new specimen of Emeraldella brutoni from the Cambrian Wheeler Formation (Drum Mountains, Utah, United States), providing new information on the appendicular anatomy of this species, is published by Lerosey-Aubril & Ortega-Hernández (2019).
- Description of new bradoriid fossils from the Chengjiang biota, revealing hitherto unknown morphological differences in limb anatomy between bradoriid species, is published by Zhai et al. (2019), who evaluate the implications of this finding for the knowledge of the phylogenetic relationships of bradoriids.
- A study on the appendage structure of Naraoia spinosa at both juvenile and adult stages is published by Zhai et al. (2019).
- Description of exceptionally preserved soft tissues from mature individuals of Peronopsis and Ptychagnostus from the Cambrian Burgess Shale (British Columbia, Canada), and a study on their implications for inferring the phylogenetic placement of agnostinids within Arthropoda, is published by Moysiuk & Caron (2019).
- Completely enrolled, phosphatized specimens of Tsunyidiscus yanjiazhaiensis are described from Cambrian Stage 3 of South China by Dai et al. (2019).
- The ontogenetic series of Pagetia vinusta is documented from the Cambrian (Wuliuan) Kaili Formation (Guizhou, China) by Cui et al. (2019).
- A study reevaluating crystals of a copper sulfide mineral found in association with specimens of Marrella splendens from the Burgess Shale, originally interpreted as evidence that the animal's blood contained the Cu-bearing protein hemocyanin, is published by Gaines et al. (2019).
- A study on the anatomy of the nervous system of Alalcomenaeus is published by Ortega-Hernández, Lerosey-Aubril & Pates (2019).
- Juvenile specimens of stylonurine eurypterids belonging to the family Hardieopteridae are described from the Famennian locality of Strud (Belgium) by Lamsdell et al. (2019), who interpret their findings as evidence indicating that eurypterids underwent a marine to freshwater transition during the Devonian, and that juvenile eurypterids inhabited sheltered nursery pools (and migrated to rivers upon reaching maturity).
- A study on the structure of the eyes of eurypterids is published by Schoenemann, Poschmann & Clarkson (2019).
- A study on ontogenetic changes in prosomal morphology in Carboniferous horseshoe crab Euproops danae is published by Tashman, Feldmann & Schweitzer (2019).
- A study on the anatomy of the appendages of the Cretaceous xiphosurid Tachypleus syriacus and on the evolution of fossil horseshoe crab appendages is published by Bicknell et al. (2019).
- A study re-evaluating the fossil evidence for lateral compound eyes in Paleozoic horseshoe crabs is published by Bicknell, Amati & Ortega-Hernández (2019).
- A study on the morphology of the millipede Phryssonotus burmiticus from the Cretaceous amber from Myanmar is published by Su, Cai & Huang (2019).

=== New taxa ===
Name	Novelty	Status	Authors	Age	Type locality	Country	Notes	Images
Albalimulus	Gen. et sp. nov		Bicknell & Pates	Carboniferous (Tournaisian)	Ballagan Formation	United Kingdom	A member of Limuloidea. The type species is A. bottoni.	
Andrognathus burmiticus	Sp. nov	Valid	Moritz & Wesener	Late Cretaceous (Cenomanian)	Burmese amber	Myanmar	A millipede, a species of Andrognathus.	
Ankitokazocaris tatensis	Sp. nov	Disputed	Ehiro et al.	Early Triassic (Olenekian)	Osawa Formation	Japan	A thylacocephalan. Laville et al. (2021) considered this species to be a junior synonym of Ankitokazocaris chaohuensis.	
Beckwithia? gracilis	Sp. nov	Valid	Zhu, Lerosey-Aubril & Ortega-Hernández	Cambrian (Furongian)	Sandu Formation	China	A member of Aglaspidida.	
Burmanopetalum	Gen. et sp. nov	Valid	Stoev, Moritz & Wesener	Late Cretaceous (Cenomanian)	Burmese amber	Myanmar	A millipede belonging to the group Callipodida and to the new family Burmanopetalidae. The type species is B. inexpectatum.	
Cambroraster falcatus	Gen. et sp. nov	Valid	Moysiuk & Caron	Cambrian (Wuliuan)	Burgess Shale	Canada	A member of Radiodonta belonging to the family Hurdiidae.	
Concavicaris parva	Sp. nov	Valid	Ehiro et al.	Early Triassic (Olenekian)	Osawa Formation	Japan	A thylacocephalan. Originally described as a species of Concavicaris; Laville et al. (2021) transferred this species to the genus Ankitokazocaris.	
Duraznovis	Gen. et sp. nov	Valid	Lara et al.	Late Triassic (Carnian)	Potrerillos Formation	Argentina	An arthropod of uncertain phylogenetic placement. Genus includes new species D. gallegoi. It was argued to be an insect belonging to the group Cicadomorpha by Fu & Huang (2020).	
Electrosminthuridia	Gen. et sp. nov		Robin, D'Haese & Barden	Miocene	Dominican amber	Dominican Republic	A springtail belonging to the family Sminthurididae. The type species is E. helibionta.	
Falcatacaris	Gen. et sp. nov	Valid	Braig et al.	Late Jurassic (Tithonian)	Altmühltal Formation	Germany	A thylacocephalan. The type species is F. bastelbergeri.	
Fibulacaris	Gen. et sp. nov	Valid	Izquierdo-López & Caron	Cambrian (Wuliuan)	Burgess Shale	Canada	A bivalved arthropod belonging to the group Mandibulata. The type species is F. nereidis.	
Hoplitaspis	Gen. et sp. nov	Valid	Lamsdell, Gunderson & Meyer	Late Ordovician	Big Hill Formation	United States	A member of Chasmataspidida belonging to the family Diploaspididae. The type species is H. hiawathai.	
Hyleoglomeris groehni	Sp. nov	Valid	Wesener	Eocene	Baltic amber	Europe (Baltic Sea region)	A millipede belonging to the family Glomeridae.	
Ligulacaris	Gen. et sp. nov	Valid	Charbonnier et al.	Early Triassic		United States	A thylacocephalan. Genus includes new species L. parisiana.	
Luohuilinella deletres	Sp. nov	Valid	Hou et al.	Cambrian Stage 3	Chiungchussu Formation	China	A probable member of Artiopoda and the order Xandarellida.	L. deletres (left)
Micragnostus iturbensis	Sp. nov	Valid	Tortello & Esteban	Ordovician (Tremadocian)	Santa Rosita Formation	Argentina	A member of Agnostida. Announced in 2019; the final version of the article naming it was published in 2020.	
Miyagicaris	Gen. et sp. nov	Disputed	Ehiro et al.	Early Triassic (Olenekian)	Osawa Formation	Japan	A thylacocephalan. Genus includes new species M. costata. However, Laville et al. (2021) considered M. costata to be a junior synonym of Ankitokazocaris utatsuensis.	
Mollisonia plenovenatrix	Sp. nov	Valid	Aria & Caron	Cambrian (Wuliuan)	Burgess Shale	Canada	A member of Chelicerata belonging to the family Mollisoniidae.	
Parisicaris	Gen. et sp. nov	Disputed	Charbonnier et al.	Early Triassic		United States	A thylacocephalan. Genus includes new species P. triassica. Laville et al. (2021) transferred P. triassica to the genus Ankitokazocaris, while Ehiro & Kano (2024) considered Parisicaris to be a genus distinct from Ankitokazocaris.	
Pickettia	Gen. et comb. nov	Valid	Bicknell, Lustri & Brougham	Late Devonian		United States	A member of Xiphosura; a new genus for "Bellinurus" carteri Eller, 1940.	
Pseudobeyrichona monile	Sp. nov	Valid	Streng & Geyer	Cambrian	Tannenknock Formation	Germany	A member of Bradoriida belonging to the family Hipponicharionidae.	
Siphonophora hui	Sp. nov	Valid	Jiang et al.	Late Cretaceous (Cenomanian)	Burmese amber	Myanmar	A millipede belonging to the group Siphonophorida.	
Sloveniolimulus	Gen. et sp. nov	Valid	Bicknell et al.	Middle Triassic (Anisian)	Strelovec Formation	Slovenia	A horseshoe crab. Genus includes new species S. rudkini.	
Stilpnocephalus	Gen. et sp. nov	Valid	Selden, Simonetto & Marsiglio	Carboniferous (Kasimovian)	Meledis Formation	Italy	A horseshoe crab belonging to the family Belinuridae. The type species is S. pontebbanus.	
Tasmaniolimulus	Gen. et sp. nov	Valid	Bicknell	Early Triassic	Jackey Shale	Australia	A member of Xiphosurida belonging to the family Austrolimulidae. The type species is T. patersoni.	
Tuzoia lazizhaiensis	Sp. nov	Valid	Wen et al.	Cambrian Stage 4	Balang Formation	China		
Zhiwenia	Gen. et sp. nov	Valid	Du et al.	Cambrian Stage 3	Xiaoshiba Lagerstätte	China	A non-trilobite artiopodan. Genus includes new species Z. coronata.	
