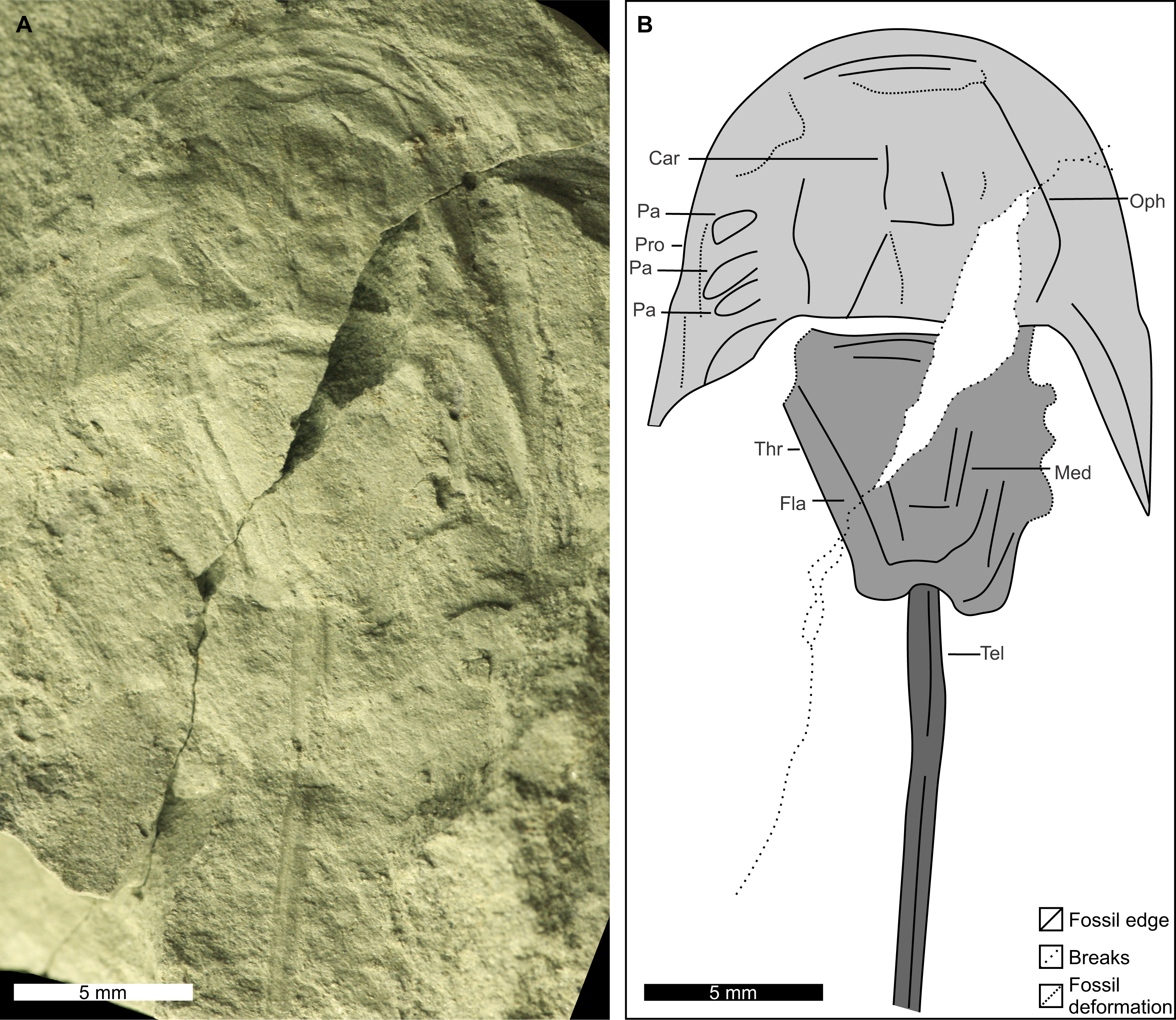
- Holotype
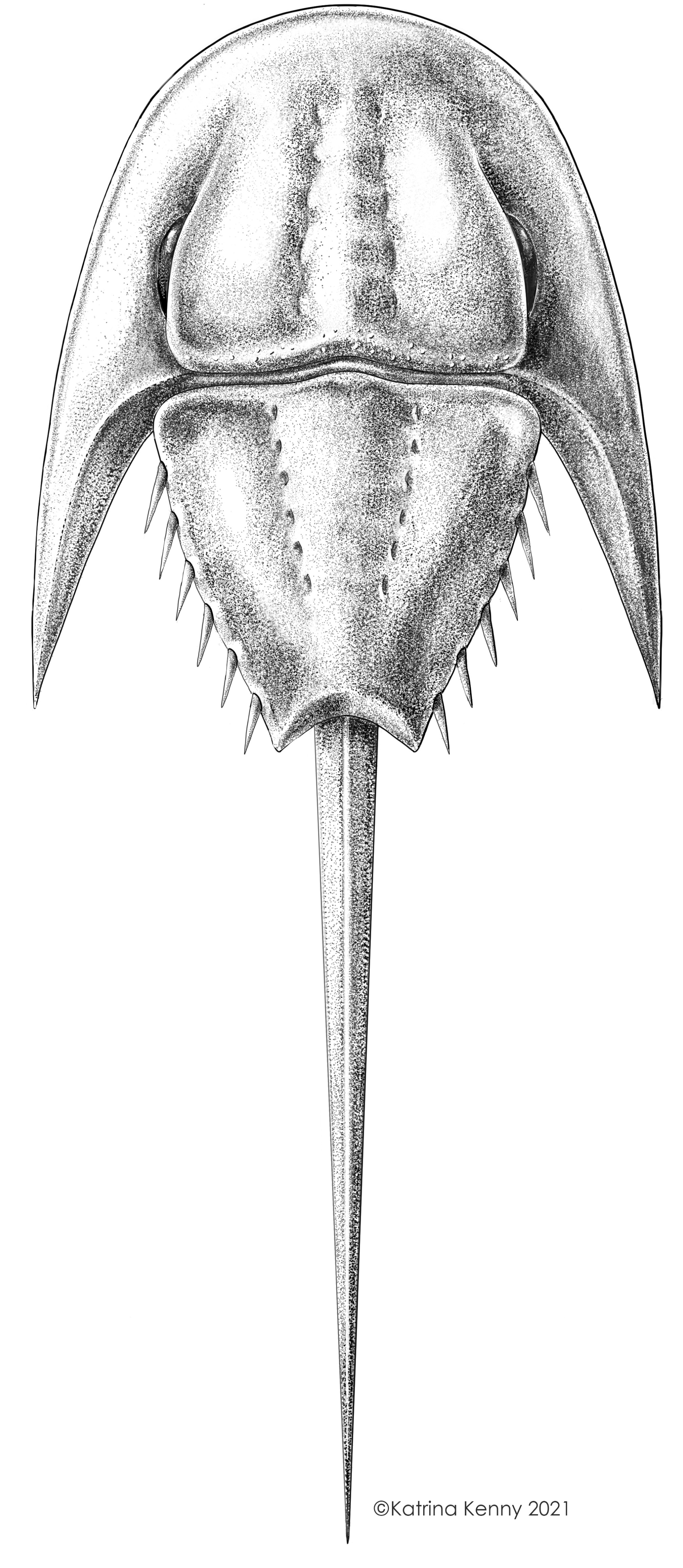
- Reconstruction

Scientific classification
- Kingdom: Animalia
- Phylum: Arthropoda
- Subphylum: Chelicerata
- Order: Xiphosura
- Family: †Austrolimulidae
- Genus: †Attenborolimulus; Bicknell & Shcherbakov, 2021
- Species: †A. superspinosus

Binomial name
- †Attenborolimulus superspinosus Bicknell & Shcherbakov, 2021

= Attenborolimulus =

Attenborolimulus Temporal range: Olenekian

Extinct genus of horseshoe crab

Attenborolimulus is an extinct genus of austrolimulid horseshoe crab with one known species: Attenborolimulus superspinosus. This genus is known from the Petropavlovka Formation in Russia, dating to the Olenekian age (early Triassic).

== Etymology ==
The genus is named after David Attenborough for his work in conservation and science communication, whose name was combined with "Limulus", the most well documented living genus of horseshoe crab. The specific epithet "superspinosus" reflects the species' hypertrophied genal spines.

== Description ==
Attenborolimulus is much smaller than modern horseshoe crabs, with the holotype specimen being only 3.2 centimetres (1.3 in) long despite being mostly complete. The genal spines, like those of other austrolimulids, are strongly pronounced.

== Palaeoecology ==
Attenborolimulus inhabited brackish to freshwater environments. While the beds of the Petropavlovka Formation are mostly red in colour, Attenborolimulus specimens were instead discovered within a one-metre thick lens of grey siltstone to sandstone. This sediment likely accumulated within an ephemeral pond during a flood.

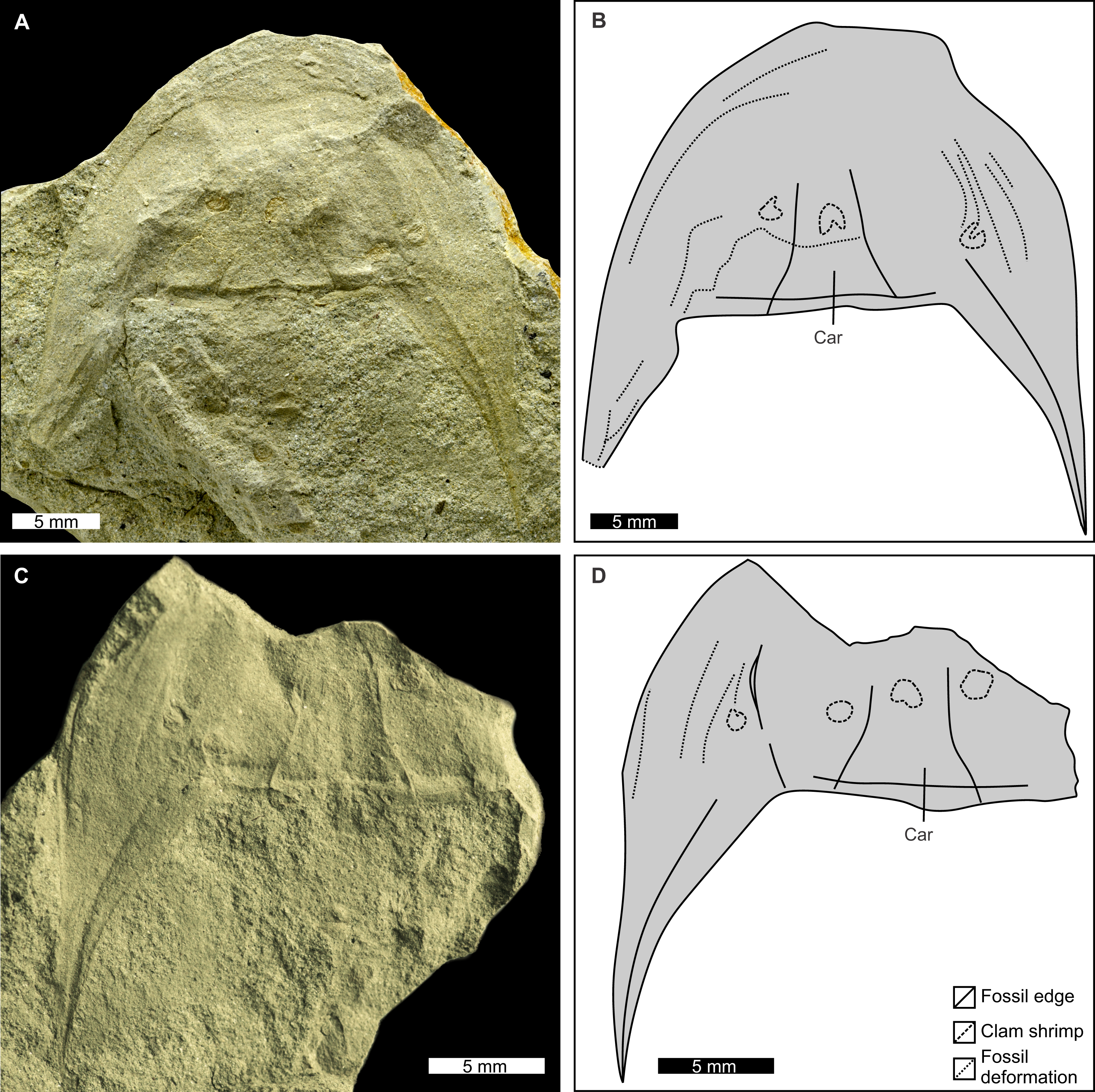
Paratype

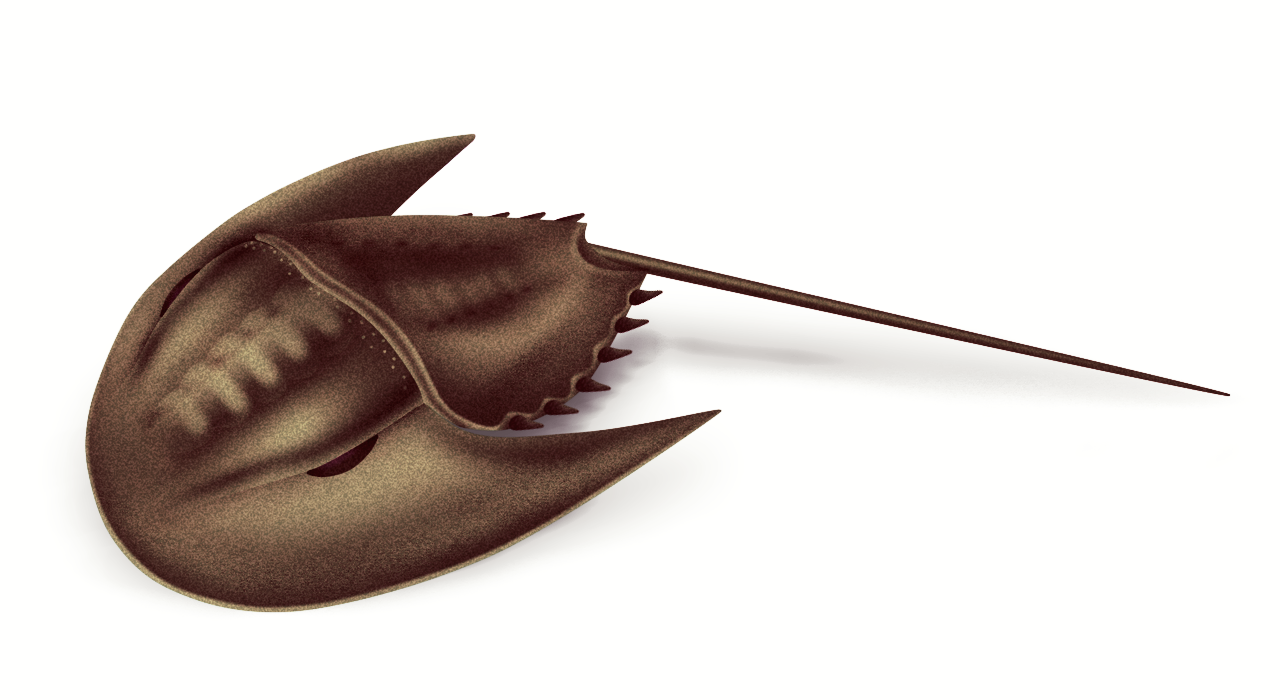
Reconstruction

== See also ==
- List of things named after David Attenborough and his works
