= Gable Creek Formation =

Geologic formation in Oregon, United States

- Stratigraphic range: Albian; ~113–100 Ma
- Type: Geological formation
- Unit of: Mitchell Group

Lithology
- Primary: Sandstone, conglomerate

Location
- Coordinates: 44.5°N 120.1°W
- Region: Oregon
- Country: United States
- Extent: Wheeler County

Type section
- Named for: Gable Creek
- Gable Creek Formation (the United States) Gable Creek Formation (Oregon)

The Gable Creek Formation is a sedimentary rock formation from the Albian age of the Early Cretaceous. The formation is in Wheeler County, Oregon of the United States of America and is intertongued with the similarly aged Hudspeth Formation. The formation mostly consists of fluvial-deltaic sandstones and conglomerates. Marine fossils can be found throughout the formation including various species of ammonites, clams and other mollusks. The Gable Creek Formation gets its name from Gable Creek, a creek that runs through much of the formation.

== Fossil content ==
Ammonites of the Gable Creek Formation
| Genus | Species | Location | Stratigraphic position | Material | Notes | Images |
|---|---|---|---|---|---|---|
| Desmoceras | D. alamoense | Oregon | | shell | D. alamoense can be found in the nearby Hudspeth Formation as well | |
| Desmoceras | D. voyi | Oregon | | | | |
| Desmoceras | D. berryae | Oregon | | | | |
| Anisoceras | A. merriami | Oregon | | | | |
| Tetragonites | T. timotheus | Oregon | | | | |
| Oxytropidoceras | O. packardi | Oregon | | | | |
| Lechites | L. gaudini | Oregon | | | | |
| Mortoniceras | M. perinflatum | Oregon | | | | Mortoniceras inflatum |
| Tragodesmoceras | T. ashlandicum | Oregon | | | | |
| Binneyites | B. parkensis | Oregon | | | | |

=== Other invertebrates ===
Non-ammonite invertebrates of the Gable Creek Formation
| Genus | Species | Location | Stratigraphic position | Material | Notes | Images |
|---|---|---|---|---|---|---|
| Yaadia | Y. whiteavesi | Oregon | | | | |
| Yaadia | Y. leana | Oregon | | | A common species in the Gable Creek Formation | |
| Volutoderma | V. blakei | Oregon | | | | |
| Lunatia | L. halli | Oregon | | | | |
| Natica | N. allisoni | Oregon | | | | |
| Pseudomelania | P. colusaensis | Oregon | | | | |
| Turritella | T. hearni | Oregon | | | | |
| Trochacteon | T. allisoni | Oregon | | | | |
| Nerinea | N. stewarti | Oregon | | | | |
| Cucullaea | C. truncata | Oregon | | external molds and clam shells | | |
| Parallelodon | P. brewereanus | Oregon | | | | |
| Pachycardium | P. remondianum | Oregon | | | | |
| Corbula | C. parilis | Oregon | | | | |
| Volsella | V. sikiyouensis | Oregon | | | | |
| Nucula | N. truncata | Oregon | | | | |
| Acila | A. demessa | Oregon | | | | |
| Aucellina | A. dawlingi | Oregon | | | | |
| Syncyclonema | S. latum | Oregon | | | | |
| Cercomya | C. hesperia | Oregon | | | | |
| Periplomya | P. oregonensis | Oregon | | | | |
| Pterotrigonia | P. evansana | Oregon | | Clam shells in various states of preservation | | Pterotrigonia caudata |
| Tenea | T. inflata | Oregon | | | | |
| Anatina | A. tryoniana | Oregon | | | | |
| Cymbophora | C. gabbiana | Oregon | | | | |
| Solecurtus | S. chapmani | Oregon | | | | |
| Meekia | M. chapmani | Oregon | | | | |
| Tellina | T. paralis | Oregon | | | | |
| Calva | C. nitida | Oregon | | | | |
| Flaventia | F. zeta | Oregon | | | | |
| Venus | Indeterminate | Oregon | | | | |
| Terebratella | T. allisoni | Oregon | | | | |
| Dentalium | D. californianum | Oregon | | | | |

== See also ==
- Paleontology in Oregon
