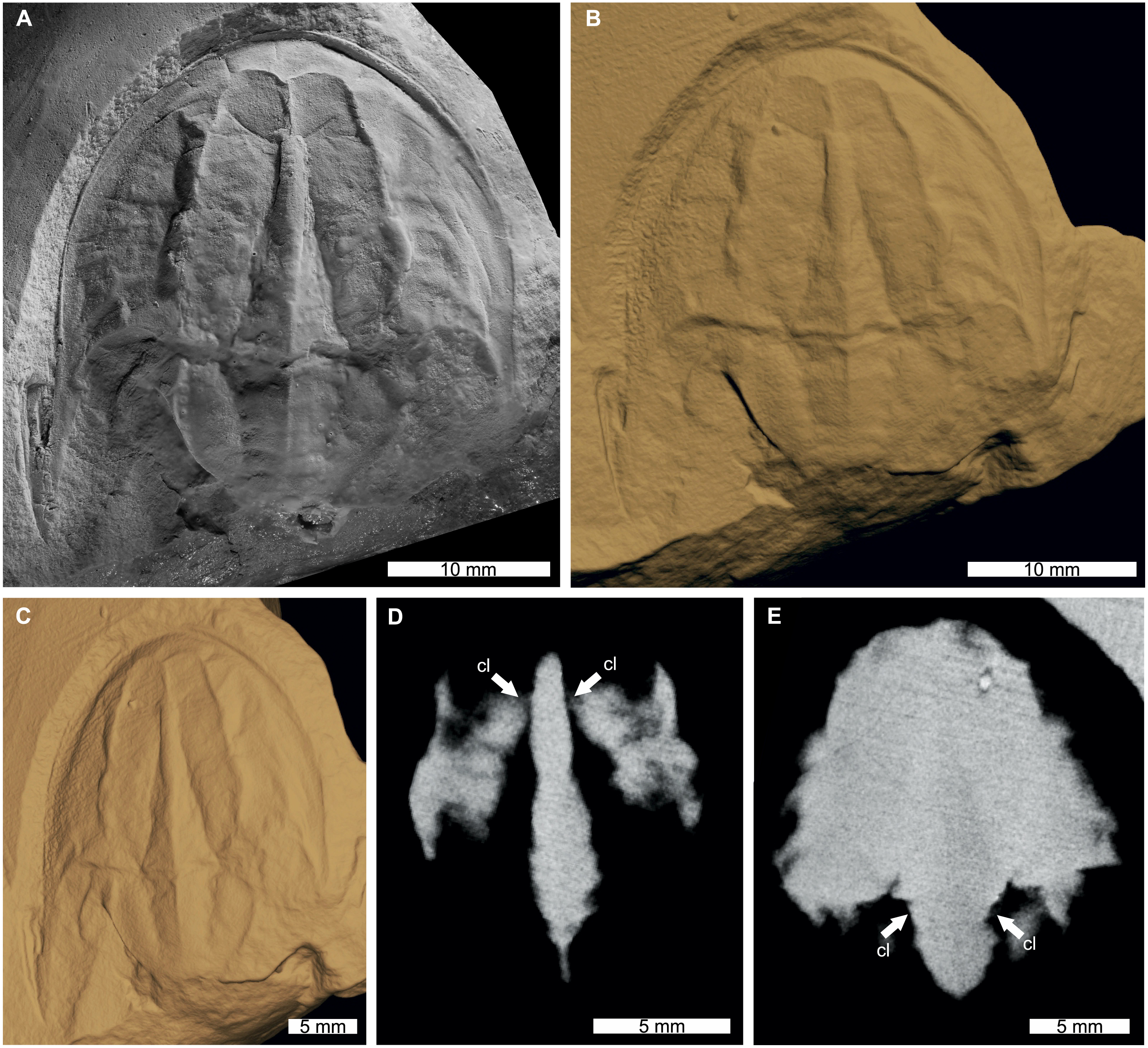
- The holotype specimen (catalogue number UTGD 123979)

Scientific classification
- Kingdom: Animalia
- Phylum: Arthropoda
- Subphylum: Chelicerata
- Order: Xiphosura
- Family: †Austrolimulidae
- Genus: †Tasmaniolimulus; Bicknell, 2019
- Species: †T. patersoni

Binomial name
- †Tasmaniolimulus patersoni Bicknell, 2019

= Tasmaniolimulus =

Tasmaniolimulus Temporal range: Early Triassic, Olenekian

Extinct species of horseshoe crab

Tasmaniolimulus patersoni is an extinct species of austrolimulid xiphosuran, closely related to living horseshoe crabs. It was found in the Early Triassic Jackey Shale of Tasmania, Australia. Originally considered an indeterminate species of Paleolimulus, it was formally named as a new genus and species in 2019 by Russell Bicknell. Unlike living horseshoe crabs, Tasmaniolimulus is thought to have lived in freshwater.

== Research history ==
In 1989, D. L. Ewington, M. J. Clarke and M. R. Banks described a xiphosuran fossil (catalogued as UTGD 123979) found Jackey Shale of Tasmania, Australia. They compared this species to another species of extinct xiphosuran, Paleolimulus avitu from North America. They concluded that the species originated from Chhidruan stage of the Late Permian, they concluded that the fossil represented an indeterminate species of Paleolimulus.

In 2019, a paper Russel Bicknell re-examined the specimen, using synchrotron radiation X-ray tomography (SRXT) with a monochromatic beam energy of 80 keV to scan the fossil, which is preserved as an internal mold. He determined that the fossil represented a new genus and species, Tasmaniolimulus patersoni, belonging to the xiphosuran family Austrolimulidae. The species name patersoni comes from Professor John Paterson, an Australian paleologist that supported Dr. Bicknell in his scientific career. In 2022, the age of the specimen was revised to the Olenekian age at the beginning of the Triassic.

== Description ==
Tasmaniolimulus patersoni had distinctive large backward-pointing genal spines on the side of the cephalothorax. The species also had two hook-like spines on the sides of its opisthosoma. The telson was not preserved in the only known specimen. Tasmaniolimulus patersoni was also much smaller than modern horseshoe crabs, with the preserved length of the specimen only being 2.4 cm (0.94 in).

== Ecology ==
Unlike living horseshoe crabs, Tasmaniolimulus is thought have lived in freshwater environments. The large genal spines of Tasmanolimulus and other austrolimulids are thought to be an adaptation to moving in environments with unidirectional water flow, such as rivers.
