= Hudspeth Formation =

Geomorphological formation

- Stratigraphic range: Albian-Cenomanian; ~107.5–96.6 Ma
- Type: Geological formation
- Unit of: Mitchell Group
- Area: Wheeler & Lake Counties, Oregon

Lithology
- Primary: Mudstone, shale

Location
- Coordinates: 43.3°N 120.1°W
- Approximate paleocoordinates: 42.9°N 74.8°E
- Region: Oregon
- Country: United States
- Hudspeth Formation (the United States) Hudspeth Formation (Oregon)

The Hudspeth Formation is a Cretaceous sedimentary rock formation, found in Oregon of the United States of America. The formation dates to the Albian age of the Early Cretaceous period. During the Albian much of this formation was submerged beneath shallow seas resulting in the preservation of many marine fossils. Pterosaur, dinosaur and marine fossils have been recovered from the formation. It is intertongued with the Gable Creek Formation.

== Fossil content ==
=== Vertebrates ===
Vertebrates of the Hudspeth Formation
Genus	Species	Location	Stratigraphic position	Material	Notes	Images
Bennettazhia	B. oregonensis	Oregon		Humerus and two fused dorsal vertebrae	A Tapejaromorph pterosaur, possible a Caupedactylian	
Dsungaripteromorpha	Indeterminate	Oregon		Dentary fragment and two teeth	Originally referred to Bennettazhia, later reinterpreted as an indeterminate dsungaripteromorph	
Ornithopoda (Mitchell ornithopod)	Indeterminate	Oregon		Toe bone and a vertebra	First dinosaur described from Oregon (not the first discovered), likely a bloated carcass swept out into the ocean from a coastline in what is now Idaho. Further discoveries suggest it may have been deposited by a mudflow	
Ornithopoda	Indeterminate	Oregon		Vertebra	Likely the same animal as the Mitchell ornithopod.	
Plesiosauroidea	Indeterminate	Oregon		A partial skull	A short necked Plesiosauroidea	
Ichthyosauria	Indeterminate			Vertebral centra		
Scapanorhynchus sp.				Teeth	A shark	

=== Ammonites ===
Ammonites of the Hudspeth Formation
Genus	Species	Location	Stratigraphic position	Material	Notes	Images
Brewericeras	B. hulenensis	Oregon		Shell in siderite nodules		
Brewericeras	B. breweri	Oregon				
Leconteites	L. lecontei	Oregon		Shell		
Desmoceras	D. alamoense	Oregon		Siderite nodule and shells	Desmoceras is one of the most common Ammonite genera to be found in the Hudspeth Formation	
Anisoceras	Indeterminate	Oregon				
Anisoceras	A. merriami	Oregon		Coiled shell		
Mariella	M. oregonensis	Oregon		Siderite nodule		
Anagaudryceras	Indeterminate	Oregon		Siderite nodule		
Pseudohelicoceras	P. petersoni	Oregon				
Mortoniceras	M. inflatum	Oregon				
Mortoniceras	M. fallax	Oregon				

=== Other invertebrates ===
Other invertebrates of the Hudspeth Formation
Genus	Species	Location	Stratigraphic position	Material	Notes	Images
Pleuromya	P. russelli	Oregon				
Buchia	Indeterminate	Oregon				
Epiaster	E. californicus	Oregon				
Trigonarca	T. jacksonensis	Oregon				
Goniomya	G. vespera	Oregon				
Sogdianella	S. oregonensis	Oregon				
Euspira	E. conradiana	Oregon			Euspira is still extant though E. conradiana is extinct	An extant Euspira catena
Eucorystes	E. platys	Oregon			A type of small crab, also present in Europe	

== See also ==
- List of pterosaur-bearing stratigraphic units
- Paleontology in Oregon
