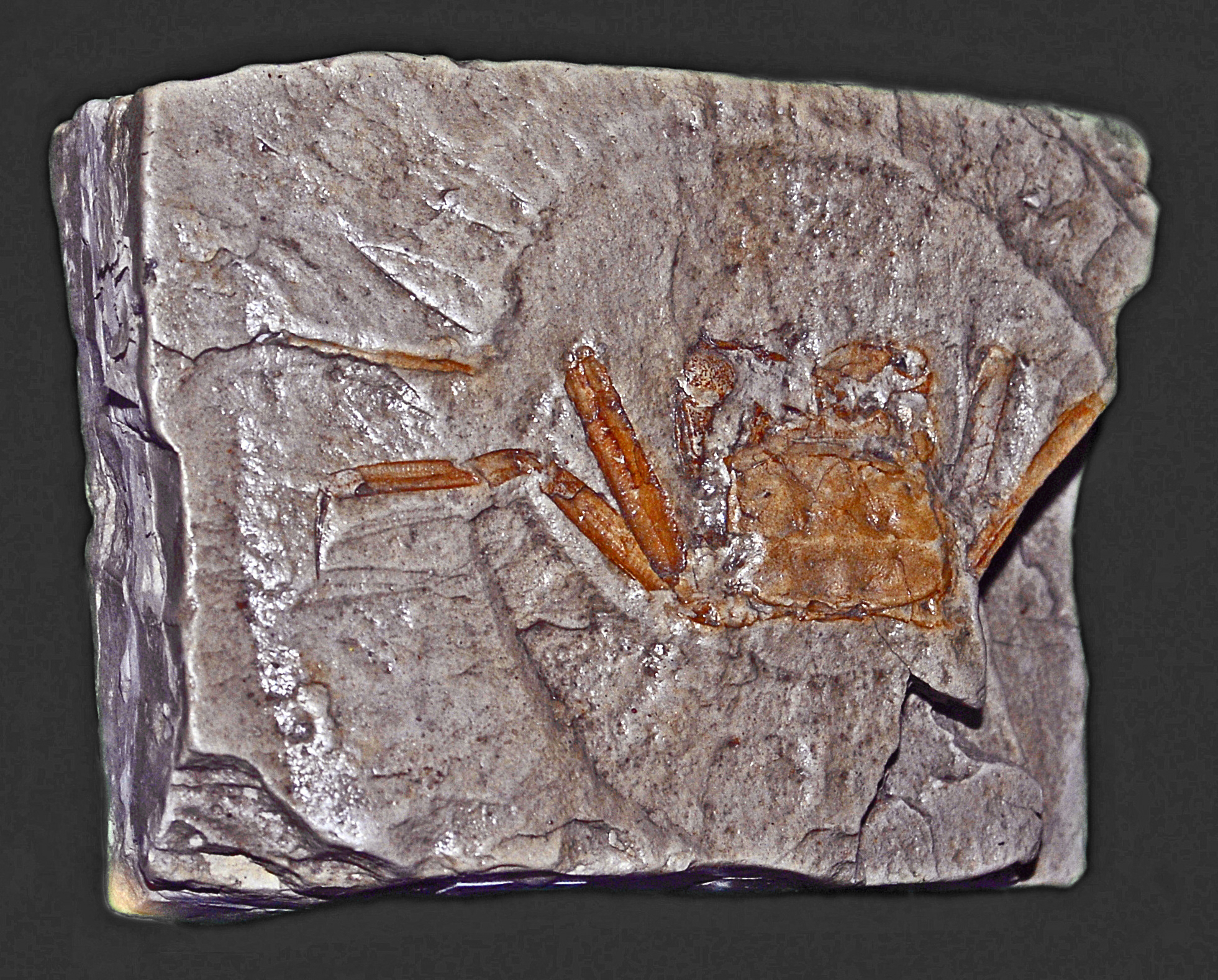
- Fossil of Retropluma craverii

Scientific classification
- Domain: Eukaryota
- Kingdom: Animalia
- Phylum: Arthropoda
- Class: Malacostraca
- Order: Decapoda
- Suborder: Pleocyemata
- Infraorder: Brachyura
- Family: Retroplumidae
- Genus: Retropluma
- Species: †R. craverii

Binomial name
- †Retropluma craverii Crema 1895

= Retropluma craverii =

Retropluma craverii Temporal range: Pliocene

Extinct species of crab

Retropluma craverii is an extinct species of heterotrematan crabs belonging to the family Retroplumidae. The species name craverii honors the Italian explorer and naturalist Federico Craveri.

== Fossil record ==
Fossils of Retropluma craverii are found in marine strata of the Pliocene of Italy (age range: from 5.333 million to 2.582 million years.

== Description ==
These crabs have subrectangular carapace, longitudinally quite convex, wider than long, with three transverse ridges. Rostrum is elongate, narrow and cylindrical.
