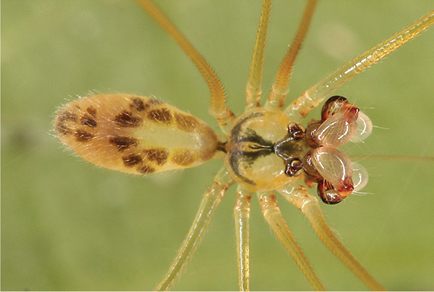
- Metagonia taruma
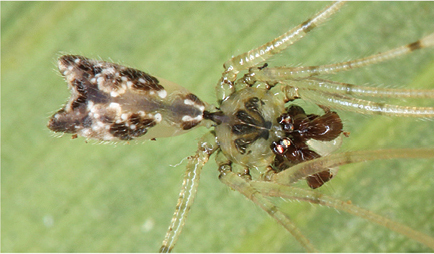
- Metagonia bifida

Scientific classification
- Kingdom: Animalia
- Phylum: Arthropoda
- Subphylum: Chelicerata
- Class: Arachnida
- Order: Araneae
- Infraorder: Araneomorphae
- Family: Pholcidae
- Genus: Metagonia; Simon, 1893

Type species
- M. bifida Simon, 1893

Species
- 91, see text

Synonyms
- Anomalaia González-Sponga, 1998; Portena González-Sponga, 2011

= Metagonia =

Genus of spiders

Metagonia is a genus of cellar spiders that was first described by Eugène Louis Simon in 1893.

== Species ==
As of August 2022 it contains 91 species, found in the Caribbean, Central America, South America, the United States, and Mexico:

- M. amica Gertsch, 1971 – Mexico
- M. argentinensis Mello-Leitão, 1945 – Brazil, Argentina
- M. asintal Huber, 1998 – Guatemala
- M. atoyacae Gertsch, 1971 – Mexico
- M. auberti Caporiacco, 1954 – French Guiana
- M. belize Gertsch, 1986 – Guatemala, Belize
- M. bella Gertsch, 1986 – Mexico
- M. bellavista Gertsch & Peck, 1992 – Ecuador (Galapagos Is.)
- M. beni Huber, 2000 – Peru, Bolivia, Brazil
- M. berlanga Huber, 2022 – Ecuador (Galapagos Is.)
- M. bicornis (Keyserling, 1891) – Brazil
- M. bifida Simon, 1893 (type) – Brazil
- M. blanda Gertsch, 1973 – Guatemala, Honduras
- M. bonaldoa Huber, 2000 – Brazil
- M. candela Gertsch, 1971 – Mexico
- M. capilla Gertsch, 1971 – Mexico
- M. cara Gertsch, 1986 – Belize
- M. caudata O. Pickard-Cambridge, 1895 – USA to Belize
- M. chiquita Gertsch, 1977 – Mexico
- M. coahuila Gertsch, 1971 – Mexico
- M. conica (Simon, 1893) – Venezuela
- M. cuate Gertsch, 1986 – Mexico
- M. debrasi Pérez & Huber, 1999 – Cuba
- M. delicata (O. Pickard-Cambridge, 1895) – Mexico to Panama
- M. diamantina Machado, Ferreira & Brescovit, 2011 – Brazil
- M. duodecimpunctata Schmidt, 1971 – Ecuador
- M. faceta Gertsch, 1986 – Mexico
- M. flavipes Schmidt, 1971 – Ecuador
- M. furcata Huber, 2000 – Brazil
- M. globulosa Huber, 2000 – Peru, Bolivia
- M. goodnighti Gertsch, 1977 – Mexico
- M. guaga Gertsch, 1986 – Mexico
- M. guianesa Huber, 2020 – Venezuela
- M. guttata Huber, 2020 – Venezuela
- M. heraldica Mello-Leitão, 1922 – Brazil
- M. hitoy Huber, 1997 – Costa Rica
- M. hondura Huber, 1997 – Costa Rica
- M. iviei Gertsch, 1977 – Mexico
- M. jamaica Gertsch, 1986 – Jamaica
- M. jarmila Gertsch, 1973 – Belize
- M. joya Gertsch, 1986 – Mexico
- M. juliae González-Sponga, 2010 – Venezuela
- M. lagrimas Huber, 2022 – Ecuador (Galapagos Is.)
- M. lancetilla Huber, 1998 – Honduras
- M. latigo Huber, 2020 – Venezuela
- M. lepida Gertsch, 1986 – Mexico
- M. lingua (Schmidt, 1956) – Colombia
- M. luisa Gertsch, 1986 – Mexico
- M. maldonado Huber, 2000 – Peru, Bolivia
- M. mariguitarensis (González-Sponga, 1998) – Venezuela, Brazil, Peru
- M. martha Gertsch, 1973 – Mexico
- M. maximiliani Brignoli, 1972 – Mexico
- M. maya Chamberlin & Ivie, 1938 – Mexico
- M. mcnatti Gertsch, 1971 – Mexico
- M. modesta Gertsch, 1986 – Mexico
- M. modica Gertsch, 1986 – Guatemala
- M. nadleri Huber, 2000 – Brazil
- M. osa Gertsch, 1986 – Costa Rica
- M. oxtalja Gertsch, 1986 – Mexico
- M. pachona Gertsch, 1971 – Mexico
- M. panama Gertsch, 1986 – Panama
- M. paranapiacaba Huber, Rheims & Brescovit, 2005 – Brazil
- M. petropolis Huber, Rheims & Brescovit, 2005 – Brazil
- M. placida Gertsch, 1971 – Mexico
- M. potiguar Ferreira, Souza, Machado & Brescovit, 2011 – Brazil
- M. puebla Gertsch, 1986 – Mexico
- M. punctata Gertsch, 1971 – Mexico
- M. pura Gertsch, 1971 – Mexico
- M. quadrifasciata Mello-Leitão, 1926 – Brazil
- M. reederi Gertsch & Peck, 1992 – Ecuador (Galapagos Is.)
- M. reventazona Huber, 1997 – Costa Rica, Panama
- M. rica Gertsch, 1986 – Costa Rica, Panama
- M. samiria Huber, 2000 – Peru
- M. secreta Gertsch, 1971 – Mexico
- M. selva Gertsch, 1986 – Costa Rica
- M. serena Gertsch, 1971 – Mexico
- M. striata Schmidt, 1971 – Guatemala
- M. strinatii (Brignoli, 1972) – Argentina
- M. suzanne Gertsch, 1973 – Mexico
- M. talamanca Huber, 1997 – Costa Rica
- M. taruma Huber, 2000 – Guyana, Brazil
- M. tinaja Gertsch, 1971 – Mexico
- M. tingo Huber, 2000 – Peru
- M. tlamaya Gertsch, 1971 – Mexico
- M. torete Gertsch, 1977 – Mexico
- M. toro Huber, 1997 – Panama
- M. triocular (González-Sponga, 2011) – Venezuela
- M. unicolor (Keyserling, 1891) – Brazil
- M. uvita Huber, 1997 – Costa Rica
- M. yucatana Chamberlin & Ivie, 1938 – Mexico
- M. zatoichi Huber, 2022 – Ecuador (Galapagos Is.)

== See also ==
- List of Pholcidae species
