= Microcytheridae =

Scientific classification
- Domain: Eukaryota
- Kingdom: Animalia
- Phylum: Arthropoda
- Class: Ostracoda
- Order: Podocopida
- Family: Microcytheridae

Family of crustaceans

Microcytheridae is a family of crustaceans belonging to the order Podocopida.

Genera:

- Cocoonocythere Zhao
- Hanaicythere Yajima, 1987
- Microcythere Mueller, 1894
