= Nephranops =

Nephranops Temporal range: Devonian

Scientific classification
- Kingdom: Animalia
- Phylum: Arthropoda
- Clade: †Artiopoda
- Class: †Trilobita
- Order: †Phacopida
- Family: †Phacopidae
- Genus: †Nephranops; Richter, 1926

Type species
- †Phacops incisus Roemer, 1866

Other species
- †Nephranops angerae Feist, 2019; †Nephranops dillanus Richter and Richter, 1926; †Nephranops occitanicus Feist, 2019

Extinct genus of trilobite

Nephranops is an extinct genus of phacopid trilobite that lived during the Famennian stage of the Devonian period. Nephranops is known from Famennian deposits in France, Germany, and Morocco.

== Palaeobiology ==
Nephranops incisus incisus had both a planktonic and a benthic protaspid larval stage, similar to other phacopids. Its ontogeny during the meraspid phase closely resembled that of Phacops and Weyerites.
