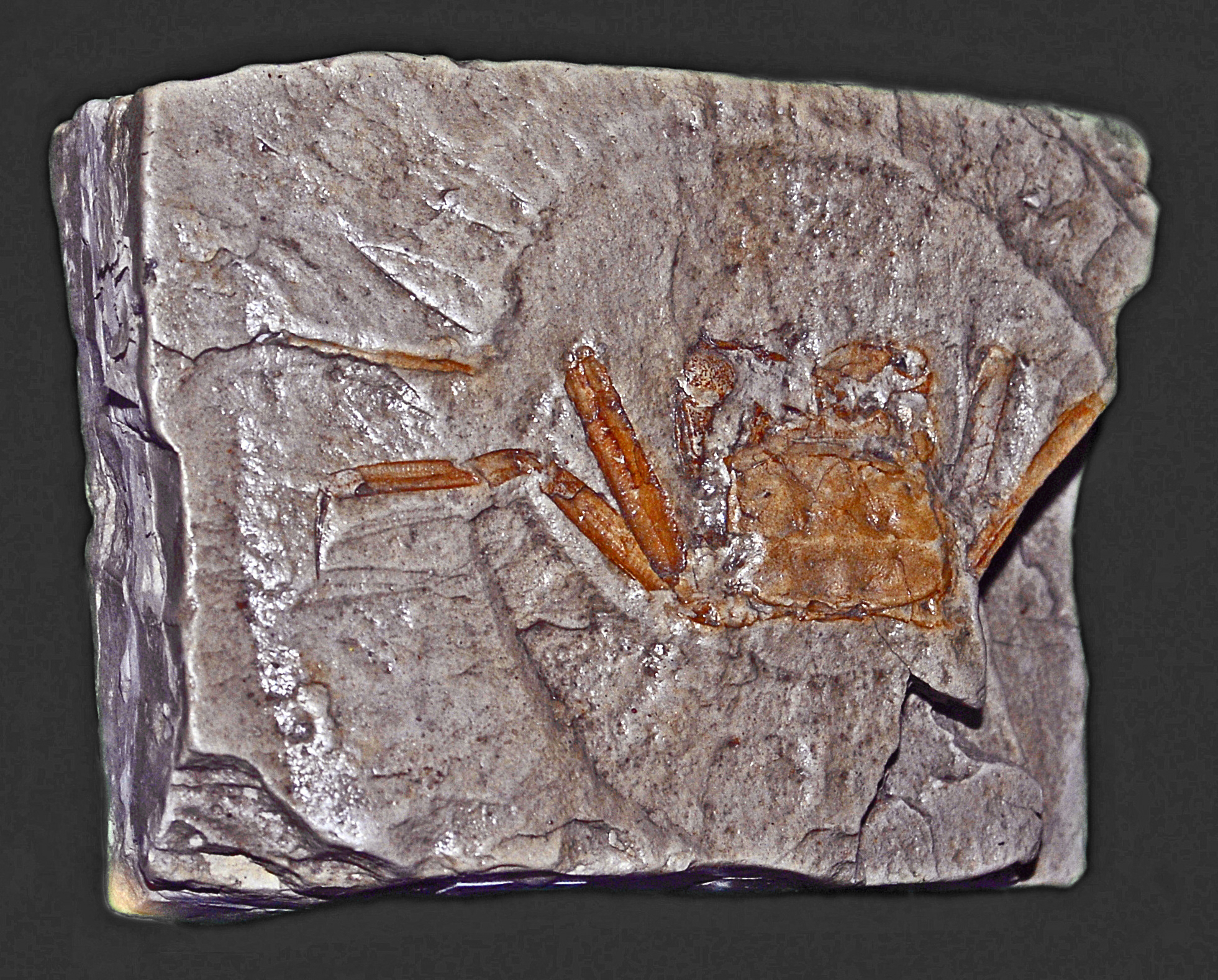
- Fossil of Retropluma craverii

Scientific classification
- Kingdom: Animalia
- Phylum: Arthropoda
- Clade: Pancrustacea
- Class: Malacostraca
- Order: Decapoda
- Suborder: Pleocyemata
- Infraorder: Brachyura
- Subsection: Heterotremata
- Superfamily: Retroplumoidea; Gill, 1894
- Family: Retroplumidae; Gill, 1894

Synonyms
- Ptenoplacidae Alcock, 1899

= Retroplumidae =

Retroplumidae Temporal range: Maastrichtian–Recent

Family of crabs

Retroplumidae is a family of heterotrematan crabs, placed in their own (monotypic) superfamily, Retroplumoidea.

== Classification ==
Eight genera are recognised, of which all but two are only known from fossils:

- Archaeopus † Rathbun, 1908
- Bathypluma de Saint Laurent, 1989
- Costacopluma † Collins & Morris, 1975
- Cristipluma † Bishop, 1983a
- Loerentheya † Lőrenthey, in Lőrenthey & Beurlen, 1929
- Loerenthopluma † Beschin, Busulini, De Angeli & Tessier, 1996
- Retrocypoda † Vía, 1959
- Retropluma Gill, 1894

Ten species in two genera survive in the deep sea of the Indo-Pacific region:

- Bathypluma chuni (Doflein, 1904)
- Bathypluma forficula De Saint Laurent, 1989
- Bathypluma spinifer De Saint Laurent, 1989
- Retropluma denticulata Rathbun, 1932
- Retropluma quadrata De Saint Laurent, 1989
- Retropluma notopus (Alcock & Anderson, 1894)
- Retropluma planiforma Kensley, 1969
- Retropluma plumosa Tesch, 1918
- Retropluma serenei De Saint Laurent, 1989
- Retropluma solomonensis McLay, 2006

Fossil specimens ascribed to the Retroplumidae are known from the Late Cretaceous onwards, with Archaeopus antennatus in Coniacian–Maastrichtian rocks in California and Archaeopus ezoensis from Turonian–Maastrichtian rocks from Japan.
