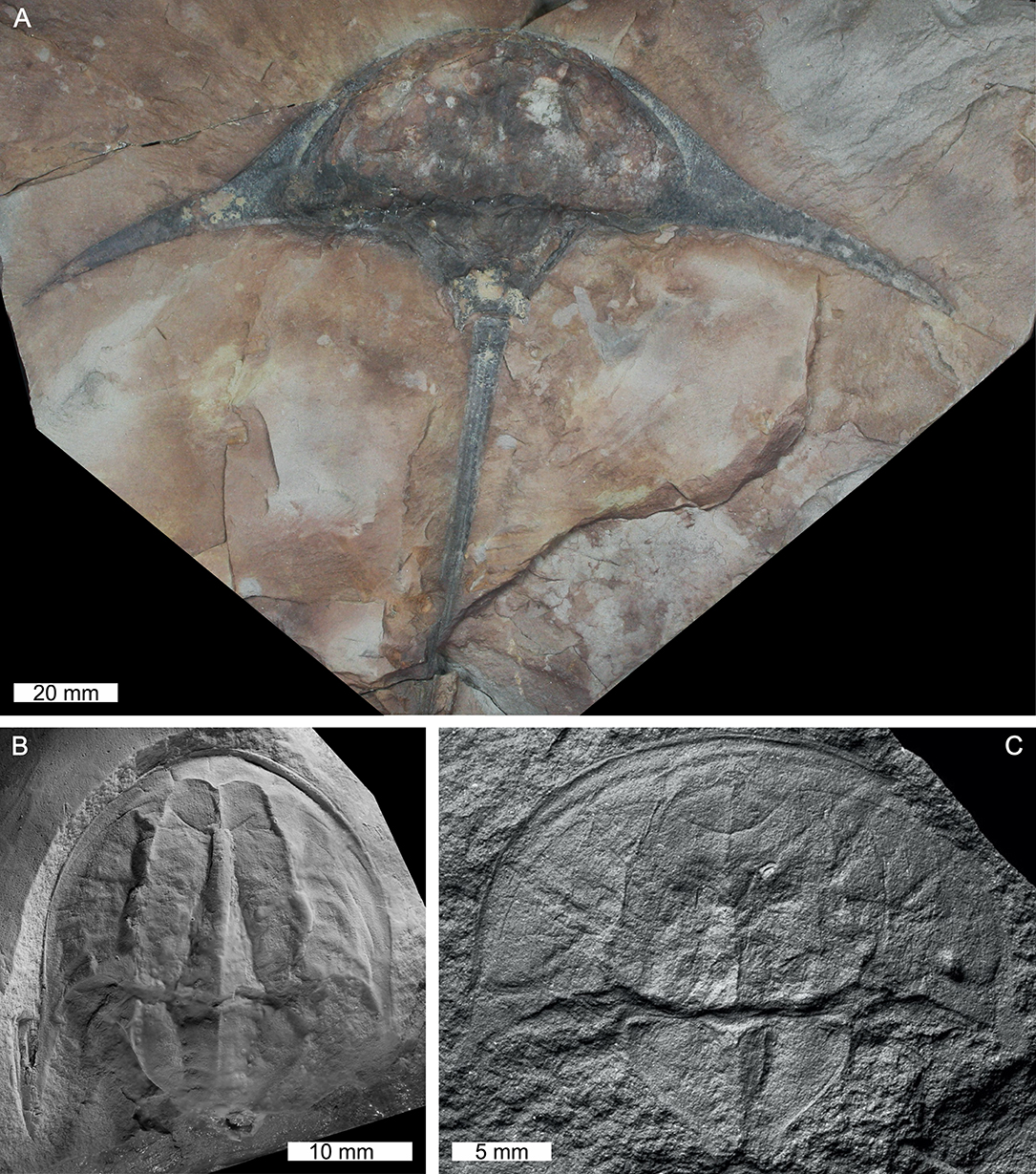
- Fossils of Austrolimulus (top), Tasmaniolimulus patersoni (left), and Dubbolimulus (right)

Scientific classification
- Kingdom: Animalia
- Phylum: Arthropoda
- Subphylum: Chelicerata
- Order: Xiphosura
- Superfamily: Limuloidea
- Family: †Austrolimulidae; Riek, 1955

= Austrolimulidae =

Austrolimulidae Temporal range: Kungurian–Hettangian

Extinct family of arthropods

Austrolimulidae is an extinct family of xiphosurans belonging to the infraorder Limulina. Members of the family are known from the Permian to the beginning of the Jurassic, though one possible species has been reported from the end of the Cretaceous. Austrolimulids are known for amongst the most extreme morphologies among xiphosurans, including large elongated genal spines. Unlike living horseshoe crabs (Limulidae), austrolimulids were likely adapted for freshwater and brackish environments. The large genal spines may have helped austrolimulids move in areas of unidirectional current, such as rivers. They are considered to be the sister group to Limulidae.

== Genera ==
- †Austrolimulus Riek, 1955 Triassic, Beacon Hill Shale, NSW, Australia
- †Attenborolimulus Bicknell, 2021 Triassic (Olenekian), Petropavlovka Formation, Cis-Urals, Russia
- †Batracholimulus Wilde, 1987 Triassic (Rhaetian), Exter Formation, Germany
- †Boeotiaspis Lamsdell, 2020 Carboniferous, United States (Jr. synonym)
- †?Casterolimulus Holland, Erickson & O'Brien, 1975 Late Cretaceous (Maastrichtian) Fox Hills Formation, North Dakota, USA (Inconsistently placed in this family)
- †Dubbolimulus Pickett 1984 Middle Triassic (Anisian) Napperby Formation, Australia
- †Franconiolimulus Bicknell, Hecker & Heyng, 2021 Early Jurassic (Hettangian) Bayreuth Formation, Germany
- †Limulitella Schimper 1853 Middle Triassic (Anisian), Grés á Voltzia Formation, France
- †Panduralimulus Allen and Feldmann 2005 Early Permian (Kungurian), Lueders Formation, Texas, USA
- †Polonolimulus Audycki et al. 2026 Early Triassic (Olenekian), Zagnańsk/Goleniawy Formation, Poland
- †Psammolimulus Lange 1923 Early-Middle Triassic, Solling Formation, Germany
- †Tasmaniolimulus Bicknell, 2019 Early Triassic, Jackey Shale, Tasmania, Australia
- †Vaderlimulus Lerner, Lucas and Lockley, 2017 Early Triassic (Olenekian) Thaynes Group, Idaho, USA
