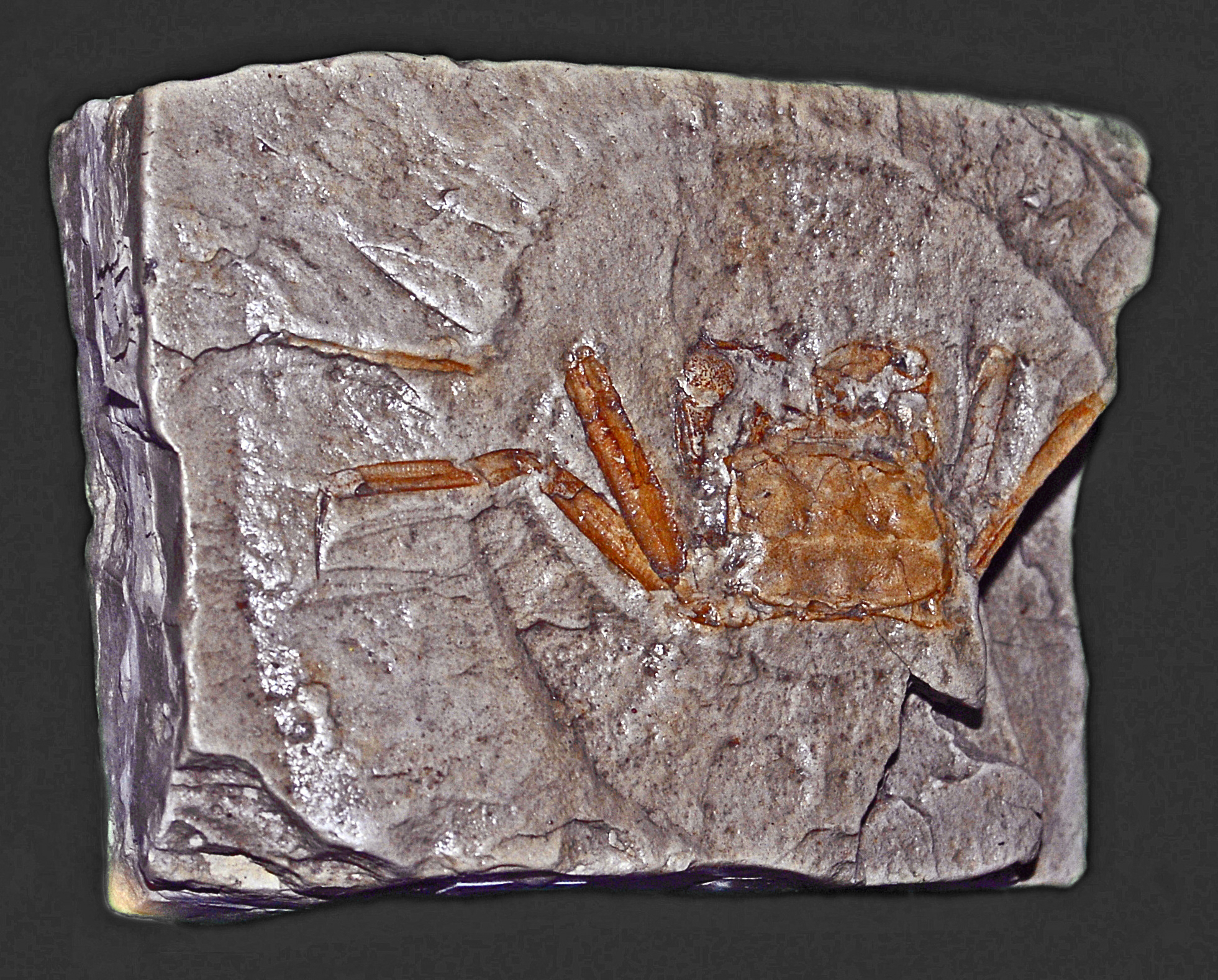
- Fossil of Retropluma craverii

Scientific classification
- Domain: Eukaryota
- Kingdom: Animalia
- Phylum: Arthropoda
- Class: Malacostraca
- Order: Decapoda
- Suborder: Pleocyemata
- Infraorder: Brachyura
- Family: Retroplumidae
- Genus: Retropluma; Gill, 1894

= Retropluma =

Retropluma Temporal range: Neogene - Pliocene

Genus of crabs

Retropluma is a genus of heterotrematan crabs belonging to the family Retroplumidae. The extant species survive in the deep sea of the Indo-Pacific region.

== Species ==
Species within this genus include:

- †Retropluma borealis Fraaife et al. 2005
- †Retropluma craverii Crema 1895
- Retropluma denticulata Rathbun, 1932
- †Retropluma eocenica Via Boada 1959
- †Retropluma gallica Artal et al. 2006
- †Retropluma laurentae Collins et al. 2003
- Retropluma notopus (Alcock & Anderson, 1894)
- Retropluma planiforma Kensley, 1969
- Retropluma plumosa Tesch, 1918
- Retropluma quadrata De Saint Laurent, 1989
- Retropluma serenei De Saint Laurent, 1989
- Retropluma solomonensis McLay, 2006

== Fossil record ==
Fossils of Retropluma are found in marine strata from the Neogene to the Pliocene (age range: from 11.608 to 2.588 million years ago.). Fossils are known from Italy and Denmark.
