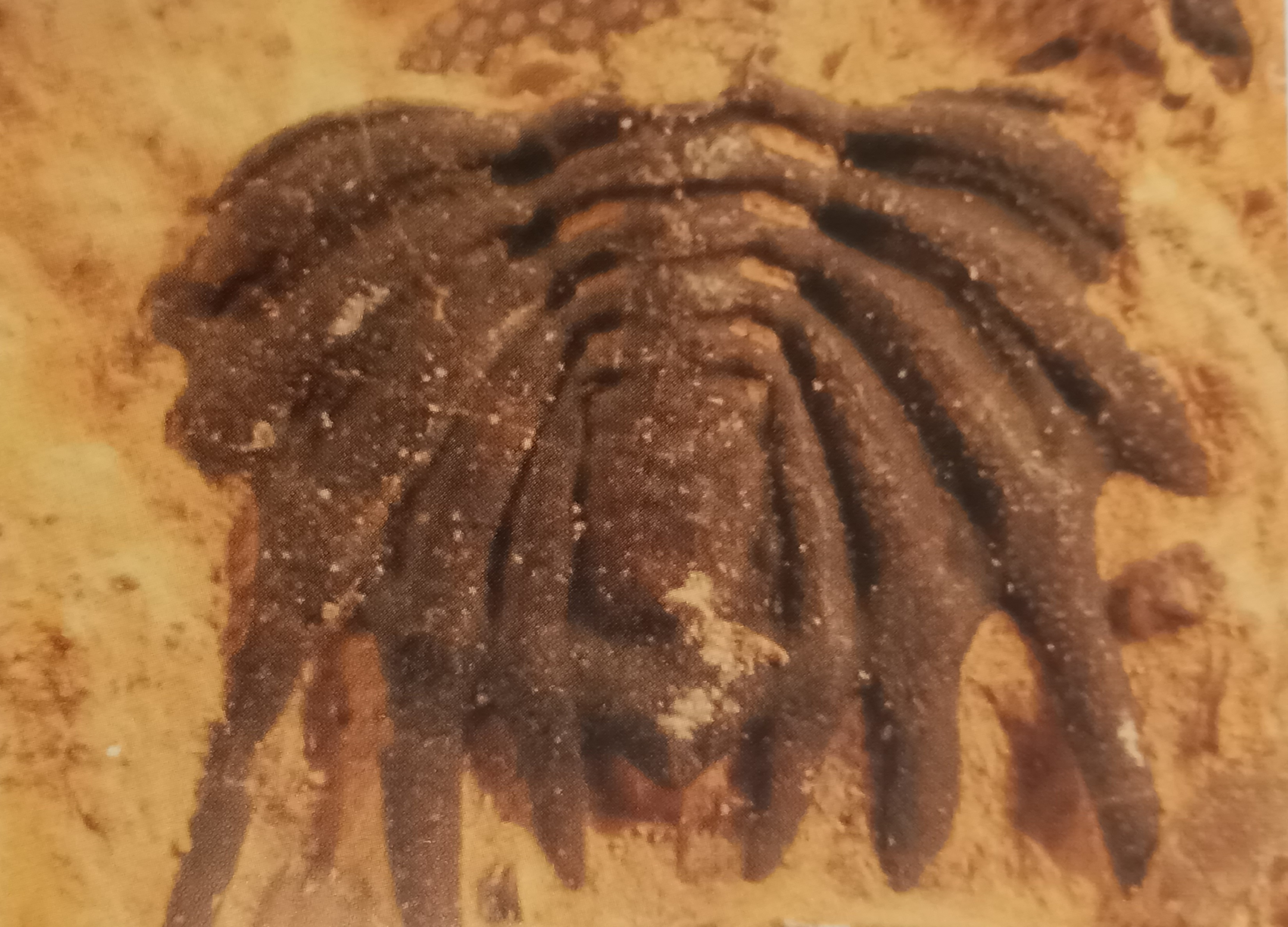
- Asteropyge fossil from Devonian, Iran

Scientific classification
- Domain: Eukaryota
- Kingdom: Animalia
- Phylum: Arthropoda
- Class: †Trilobita
- Order: †Phacopida
- Family: †Acastidae
- Genus: †Asteropyge; Hawle & Corda, 1847

Species
- A. punctata (Steininger, 1831) (type) synonym Olenus punctatus; A. boeckae Van Viersen, Taghon & Magrean, 2019; A. eonia Van Viersen, Taghon & Magrean, 2019; A. filoxenia Van Viersen, Taghon & Magrean, 2019; A. lauchensis Basse, 2003; A. perforata olpensis (Basse, 2003); A. perforata perforata Morzadec, 2003; A. plana Basse, 2003; A. pruemensis Basse, 2003; A. remscheidensis Basse, 2003; A. schoeneckenensis Basse, 2003

= Asteropyge =

Asteropyge Temporal range: Upper Emsian to Lower and Middle Eifelian

Asteropyge is an extinct genus of trilobites. It lived from the end of the Lower Devonian (upper Emsian) into the Middle Devonian (lower and upper Eifelian), in what are today France (Armorican Massif), Germany (Eifel area) and Iran.
