= Russell Bicknell =

New Zealand paleontologist

Russell Bicknell is a New Zealand paleontologist. He is an expert on Xiphosura (the group containing horseshoe crabs and their relatives) and trilobites. He gained a PhD at the University of New England, Australia, and worked there, before becoming a researcher at the American Museum of Natural History. The trilobite Amphoton bicknelli is named after him.
