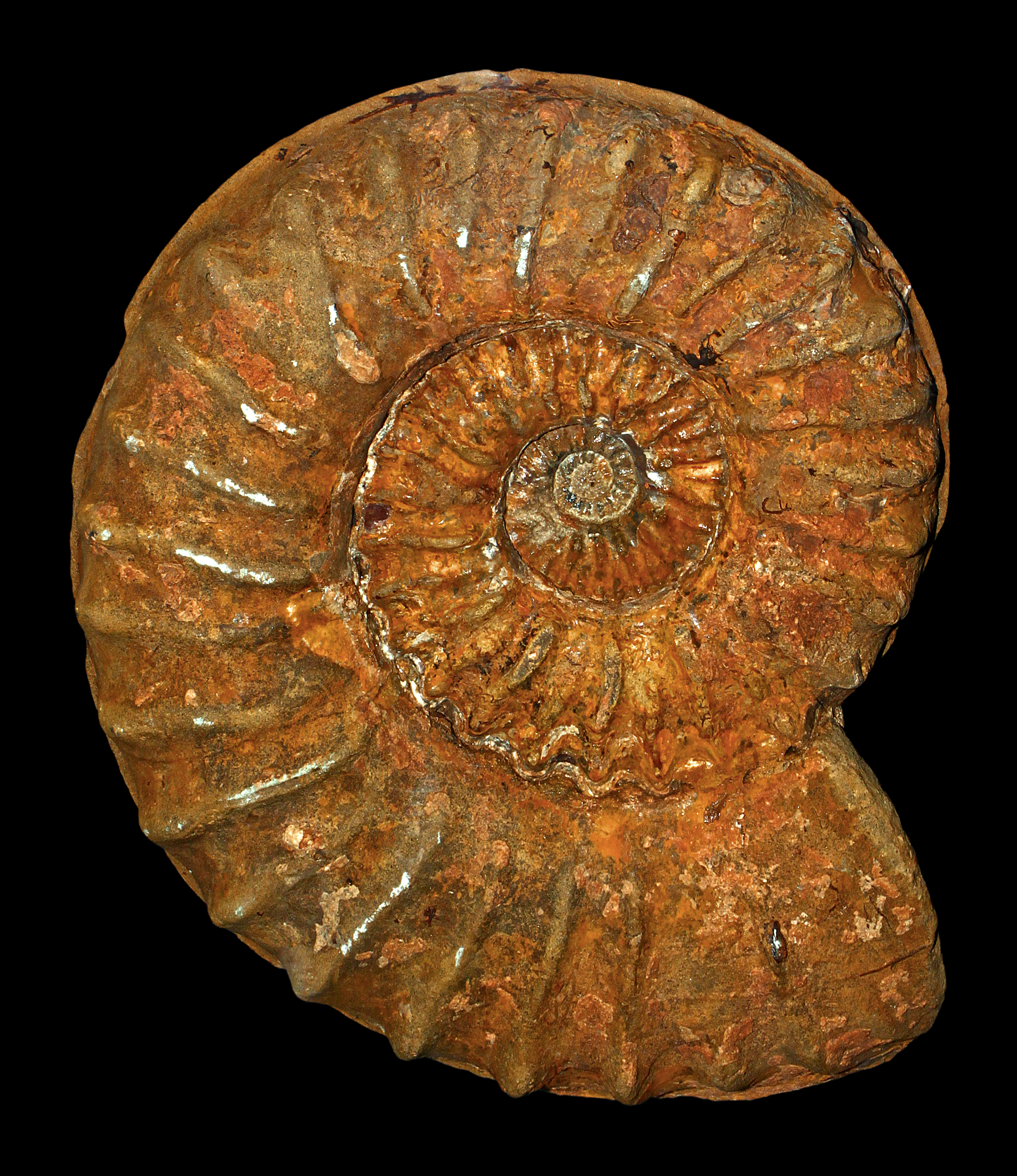
- Mortoniceras inflatum (Sowerby, 1818)

Scientific classification
- Kingdom: Animalia
- Phylum: Mollusca
- Class: Cephalopoda
- Subclass: †Ammonoidea
- Order: †Ammonitida
- Family: †Brancoceratidae
- Genus: †Mortoniceras; Meek (1876)

Subgenera
- Mortoniceras (Angolaites); Mortoniceras (Boeseites); Mortoniceras (Deiradoceras); Mortoniceras (Mortoniceras); Mortoniceras (Rusoceras); Mortoniceras (Subschloenbachia)

= Mortoniceras =

Mortoniceras Temporal range: Albian

Ammonoid genus

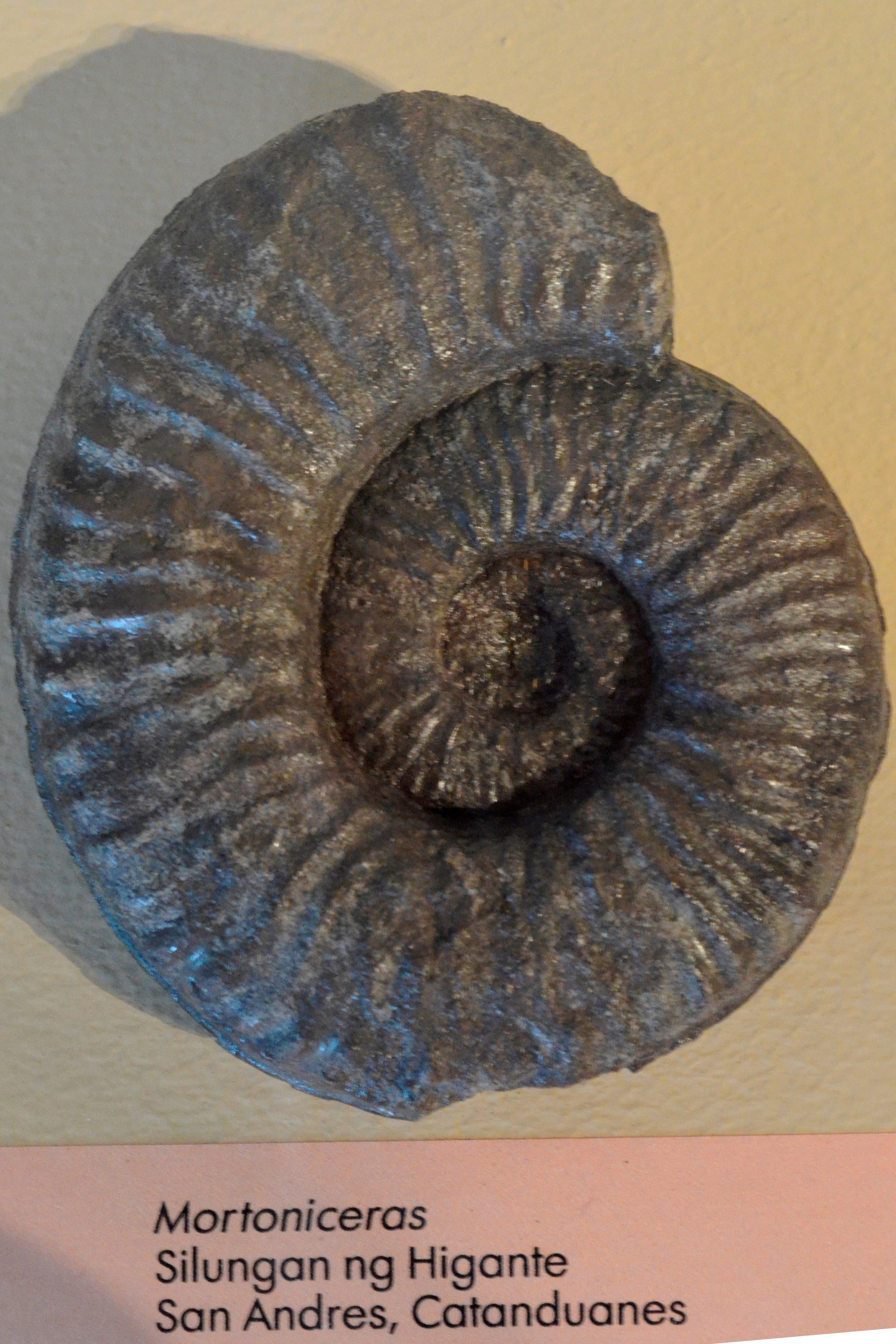
a Mortoniceras fossil found in the Philippines

Mortoniceras is an ammonoid genus belonging to the superfamily Acanthocerataceae, named by Meek in 1876, based on Ammonites vespertinu, named by Morton in 1834.

Mortoniceras is the type genus of the Mortoniceratinae, one of 4 subfamilies in the Brancoceratidae which is part of the Acanthocerataceae (renamed Acanthoceratoidea to conform with the ICZN ruling on superfamily endings)

== Distribution ==
Mortoniceras is found in middle and upper Albian sediments, at the end of the Lower Cretaceous in Algeria, Angola, Armenia, Belgium, Canada (British Columbia), Colombia (Hiló Formation), Ecuador, France, Germany, Iran, Japan, Madagascar, Mexico, Mozambique, Myanmar, Nigeria, South Africa, Spain, Suriname, Switzerland, Ukraine, the United Kingdom, the United States (California, New Mexico, Texas, Oregon), and Venezuela.

== Species ==
Mortoniceras is split up into several subgenera.

- Mortoniceras equidistans
- Mortoniceras evolutum
- Mortoniceras gainesana
- Mortoniceras leonense
- Mortoniceras scobinum
- Mortoniceras (Angolaites)
  - Mortoniceras dellense
  - Mortoniceras drakei
  - Mortoniceras gregoryi
  - Mortoniceras simplex
  - Mortoniceras wintoni
- Mortoniceras (Boeseites)
  - Mortoniceras barbouri
  - Mortoniceras howelli
  - Mortoniceras perarmata
  - Mortoniceras proteus
  - Mortoniceras romeri
- Mortoniceras (Deiradoceras)
  - Mortoniceras armintzekalensis
  - Mortoniceras beloventer
  - Mortoniceras bipunctatum
  - Mortoniceras bispinosum
  - Mortoniceras cunningtoni
  - Mortoniceras devonense
  - Mortoniceras exile
  - Mortoniceras mokarahaense
  - Mortoniceras prerostratum
- Mortoniceras (Mortoniceras)
  - Mortoniceras aequatorealis
  - Mortoniceras aitzindari
  - Mortoniceras albense
  - Mortoniceras arietiforme
  - Mortoniceras densecostatum
  - Mortoniceras downii
  - Mortoniceras evolutum
  - Mortoniceras fallax
  - Mortoniceras fissicostatum
  - Mortoniceras inflatum
  - Mortoniceras kiliani
  - Mortoniceras lowrii
  - Mortoniceras multicostatum
  - Mortoniceras nanum
  - Mortoniceras nodosocostatum
  - Mortoniceras ornatum
  - Mortoniceras pachys
  - Mortoniceras potternense
  - Mortoniceras quadrinodosum
  - Mortoniceras recticostatum
  - Mortoniceras subrotundum
  - Mortoniceras vespertinus
- Mortoniceras (Rusoceras)
  - Mortoniceras nothum
- Mortoniceras (Subschloenbachia)
  - Mortoniceras ambigua
  - Mortoniceras angolaensis
  - Mortoniceras benguellaensis
  - Mortoniceras cycloceratoides
  - Mortoniceras dombensis
  - Mortoniceras inflatiformis
  - Mortoniceras irregularis
  - Mortoniceras meunieri
  - Mortoniceras neuparthi
  - Mortoniceras orientalis
  - Mortoniceras perinflatum
  - Mortoniceras robusta
  - Mortoniceras rostratum
  - Mortoniceras stoliczkai'
  - Mortoniceras striata'
