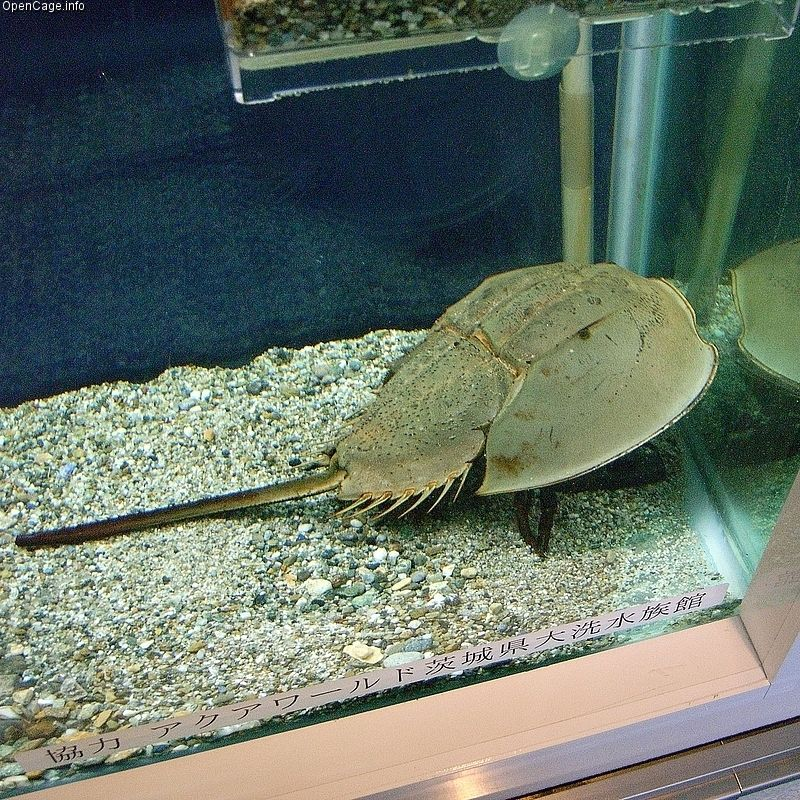
- Tachypleus tridentatus

Scientific classification
- Kingdom: Animalia
- Phylum: Arthropoda
- Subphylum: Chelicerata
- Order: Xiphosura
- Family: Limulidae
- Tribe: Tachypleini; Pocock, 1902

Genera
- Carcinoscorpius Pocock, 1902; Tachypleus Leach, 1819

= Tachypleini =

Tribe of horseshoe crabs

The Tachypleini is the tribe of horseshoe crabs. These horseshoe crabs contain a substance called tachyplesin which can be used to cure multiple diseases.

== Genera ==
There are 2 genera in the tribe Tachypleini:

- Carcinoscorpius Pocock, 1902
- Tachypleus Leach, 1819
