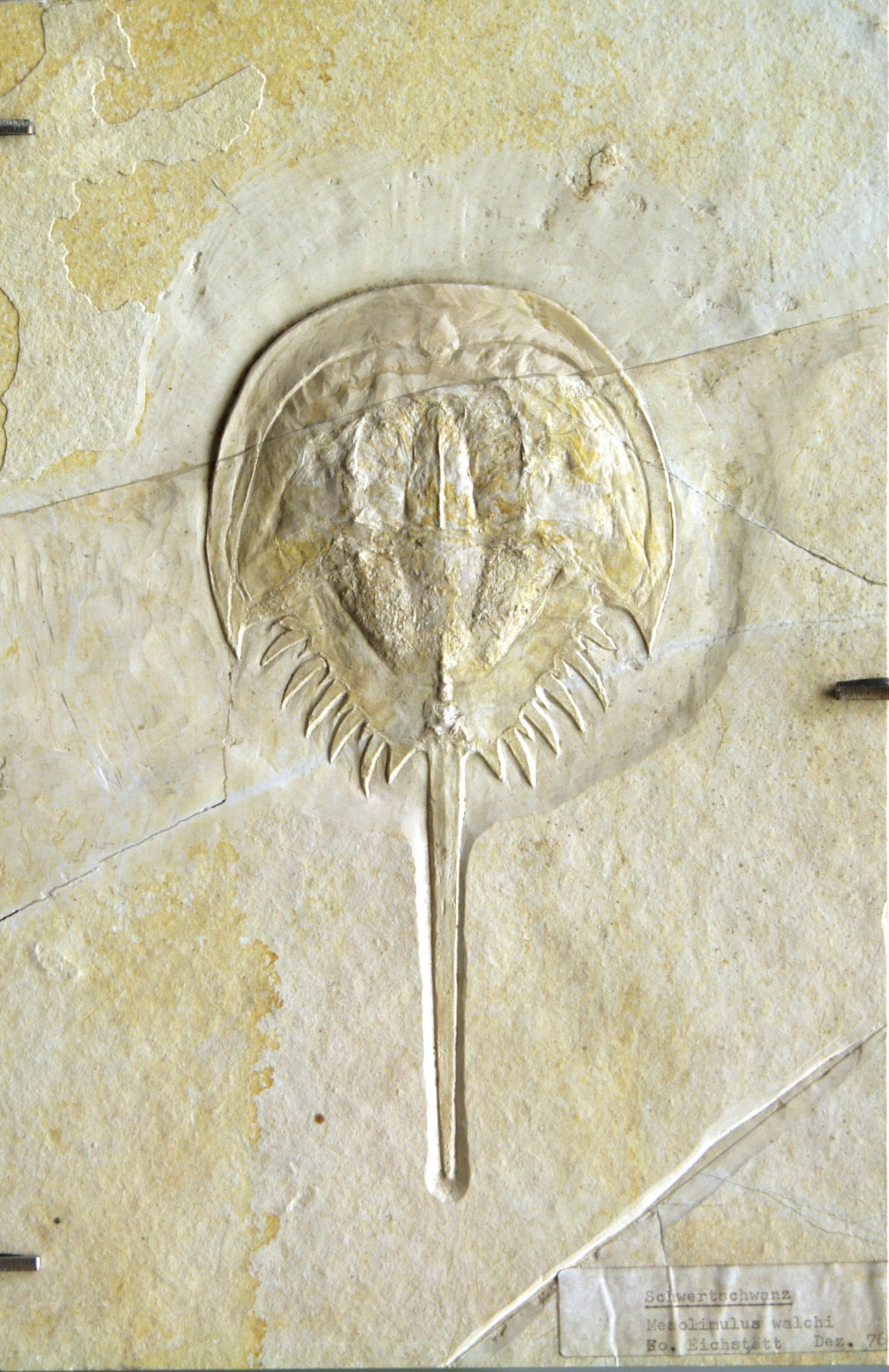
- Mesolimulus walchi

Scientific classification
- Kingdom: Animalia
- Phylum: Arthropoda
- Subphylum: Chelicerata
- Order: Xiphosura
- Family: Limulidae
- Genus: †Mesolimulus; Størmer, 1952

= Mesolimulus =

Mesolimulus Temporal range: Ladinian–Turonian

Genus of horseshoe crab relatives

Mesolimulus is an extinct genus of horseshoe crab. The best known examples are found in Solnhofen limestone near Solnhofen, Bavaria, Germany. Originally assigned to the living genus Limulus, they are related to and look virtually identical to modern horseshoe crabs. Other species assigned to Mesolimulus have been recorded spanning over 140 million years from the Middle Triassic to Late Cretaceous from England, Spain, Siberia and Morocco.

== Kouphichnium ==
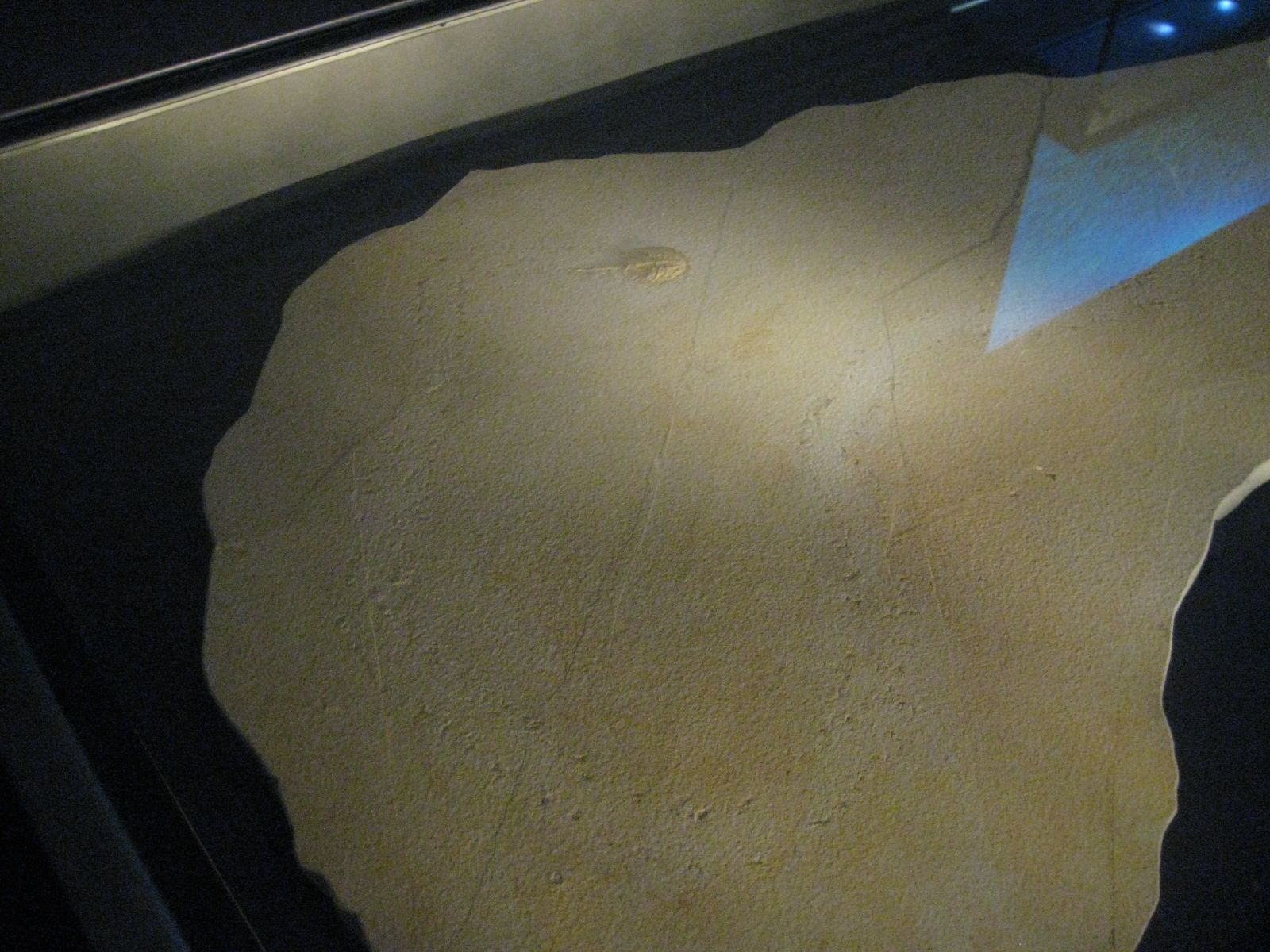
Mesolimulus walchi fossil and track

The unusual trackways left by these animals at Solnhofen were originally thought to have been made by birds or pterosaurs, since they included a cross-shaped marking comparable with the impression of a typical bird foot. Eventually they were correctly identified as arthropod footprints and named Kouphichnium walchi, as proved by some remarkable 'death traces' showing a Mesolimulus circling round on itself before dying. The last leg of more advanced horseshoe crabs is modified into a so-called 'pusher' which consists of four plates at the tip which push against the soft sediment rather like a snow-shoe. This was what left the unusual bird-like footprints.

Horseshoe crabs in general date to the Ordovician Period, more than 440 million years ago, and late Paleozoic Euproops fossils indicate that they have changed little over the last 300 million years. Fossils preserved in Solnhofen limestone are unusual because soft body parts and skeletons are clearly represented.

== Species ==
After Bicknell et al. (2021):

- Mesolimulus sibiricus Ponomarenko, 1985, Middle Jurassic (Bathonian) Talynzhansk Formation, Russia
- Mesolimulus tafraoutensis Lamsdell et al., 2020 Late Cretaceous (upper Cenomanian –lower Turonian) Gara Sbaa Lagerstatte, Morocco
- Mesolimulus walchi (Desmarest, 1822) Late Jurassic (Kimmeridgian –Early Tithonian) Solnhofen Limestone, Germany
- Mesolimulus woodwardi (Watson, 1909) Middle Jurassic (Aalenian) Northampton Sand Formation, England
- Mesolimulus crespelli Vıa Boada, 1987 Middle Triassic (Ladinian) Alcover Limestone Formation, Spain
