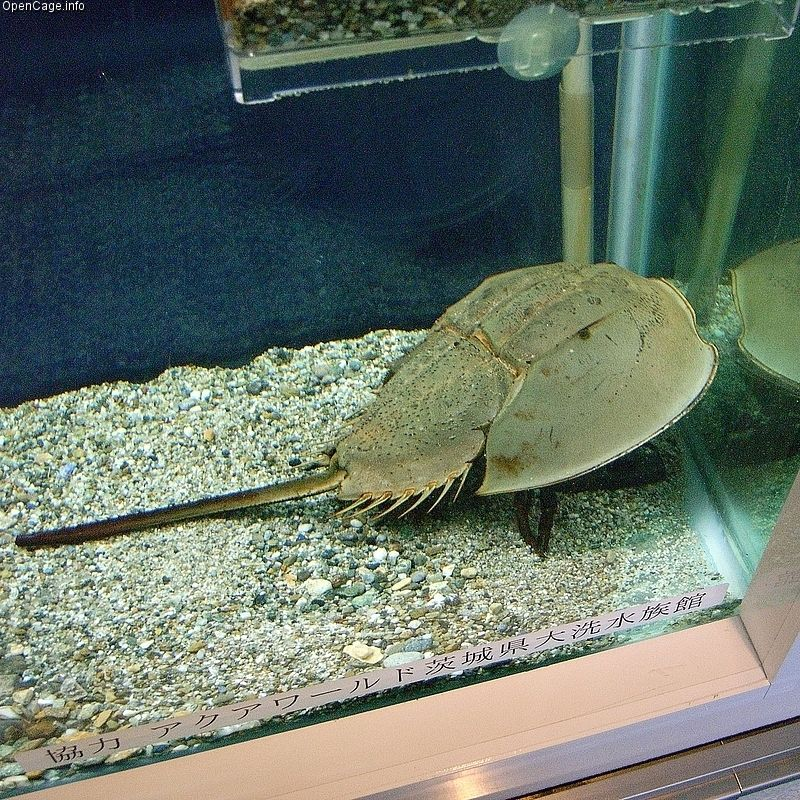
- Male

Conservation status
- Endangered (IUCN 3.1)

Scientific classification
- Kingdom: Animalia
- Phylum: Arthropoda
- Subphylum: Chelicerata
- Order: Xiphosura
- Family: Limulidae
- Genus: Tachypleus
- Species: T. tridentatus

Binomial name
- Tachypleus tridentatus (Leach, 1819)

Synonyms
- Limulus tridentatus Leach, 1819; Limulus longispina van der Hoeven, 1838

= Tachypleus tridentatus =

Species of arthropod

Tachypleus tridentatus, commonly known as the Chinese horseshoe crab, Japanese horseshoe crab, or tri-spine horseshoe crab, is a species of horseshoe crab found in Southeast and East Asia, with records from China, Indonesia, Japan, South Korea, Malaysia, the Philippines, Taiwan, and Vietnam. It is found in coastal marine and brackish waters, and tolerates colder temperatures than the other Asian horseshoe crabs (Tachypleus gigas and Carcinoscorpius rotundicauda), although juveniles still need water warmer than 22 °C (72 °F) to moult.

== Description ==
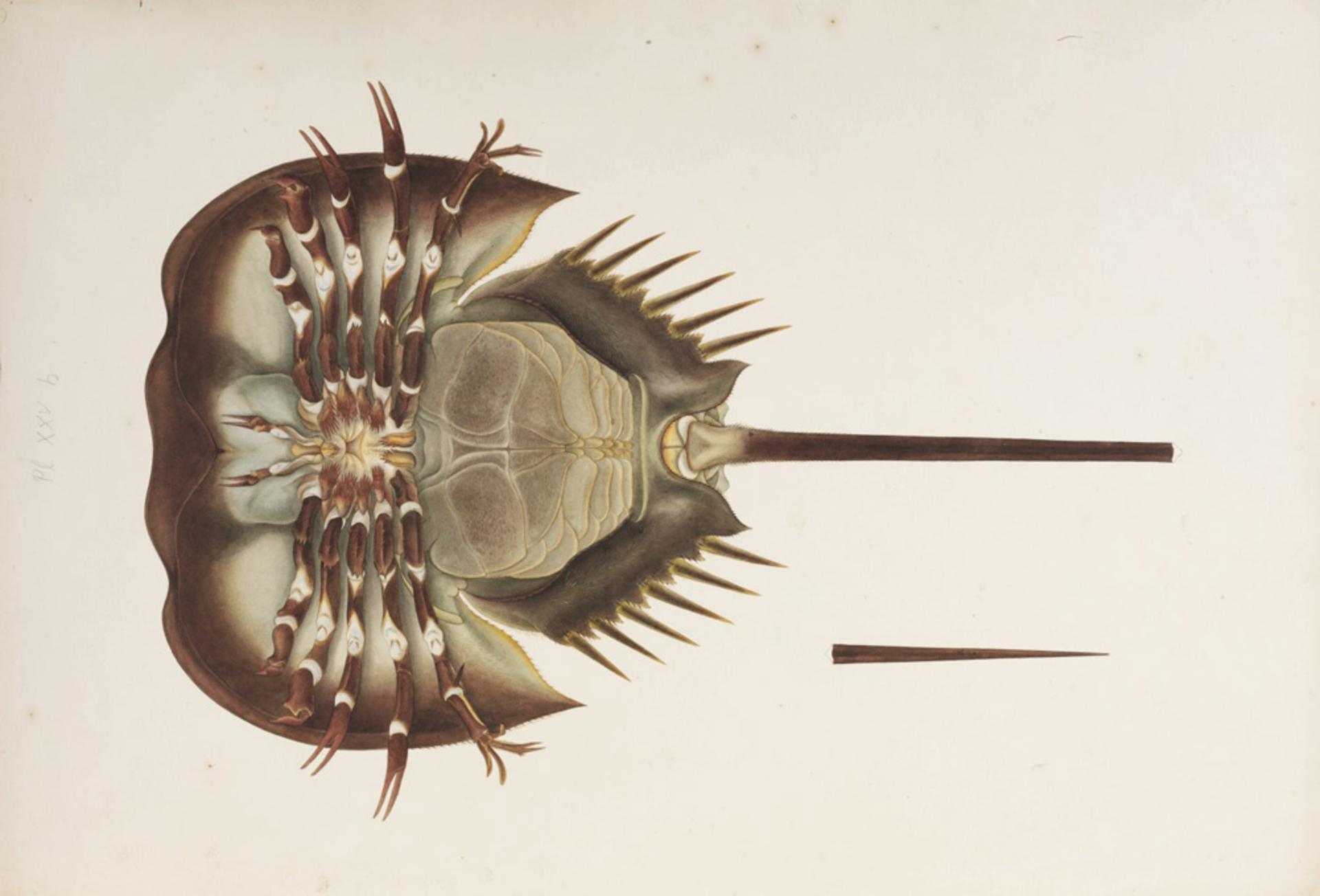

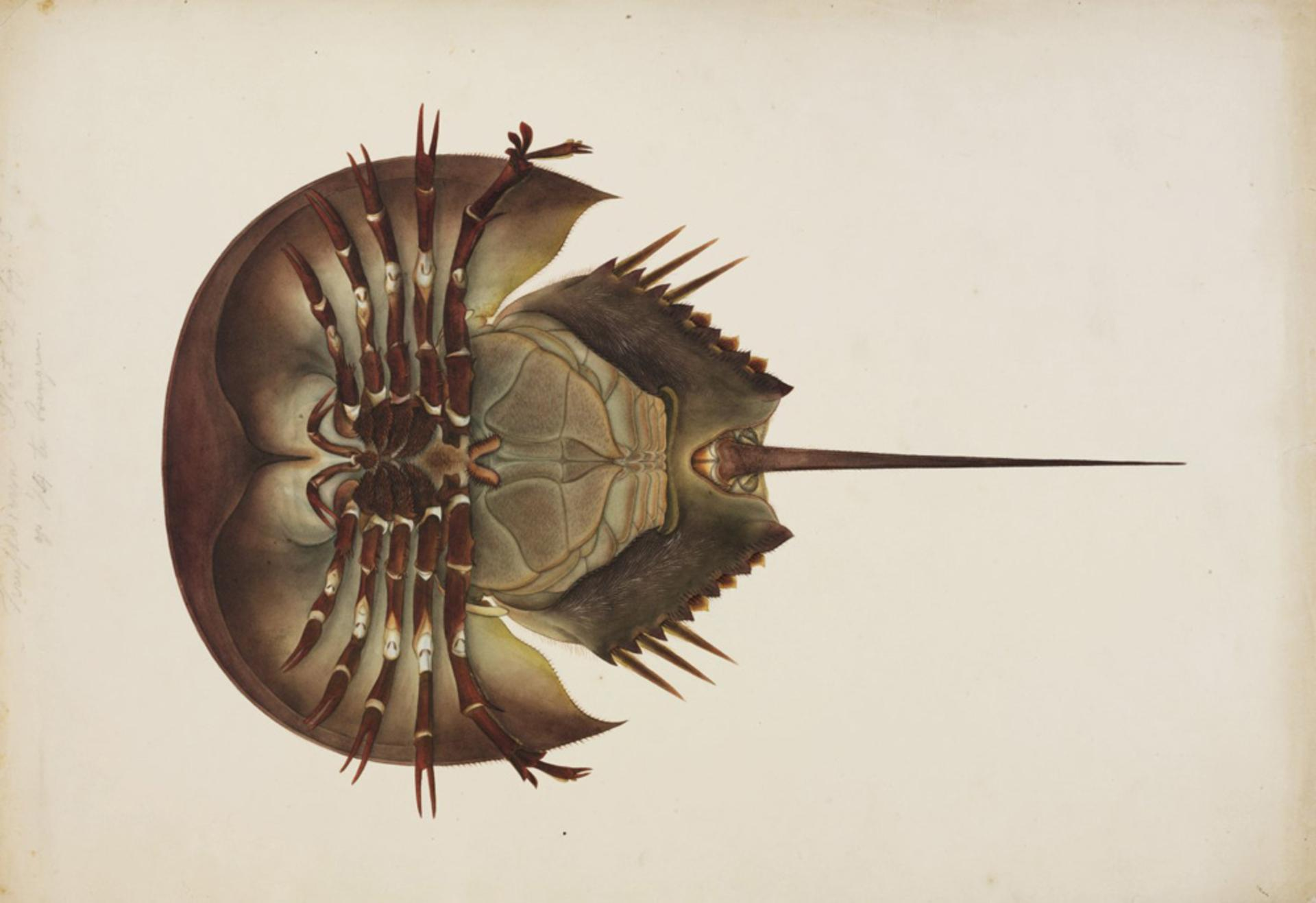
Underside of male (above) and female (below) drawn and painted by Kawahara Keiga, 1823-1829. Notice the long spines on the rear carapace (six on either side in male, three in female) and the shape of the first two pairs of walking legs (hook-like in male, scissor-like in female)

Horseshoe crabs are not crabs at all, but are most closely related to spiders and scorpions, and may even be arachnids themselves. The cephalothorax is protected by this single large, horseshoe-shaped plate, and neither it nor the abdomen is visibly segmented. The tail bears a long spike, known as the telson. Like other horseshoe crabs, the carapace of T. tridentatus consists of a larger frontal one (the prosoma) and a smaller, spine-edged rear one (the opisthosoma). There are six pairs of prosomal appendages/legs, consisting of a small frontal pair in front of the mouth and five larger walking/pushing legs on either side of the mouth. The book gills are located on the underside of the opisthosoma. Both the common name tri-spine horseshoe crab and the scientific name tridentatus refer to the three small spiny processes on the rear part of the opisthosoma (one spine in the middle above the tail and one on either side), while other species only have a single spine (in the middle).

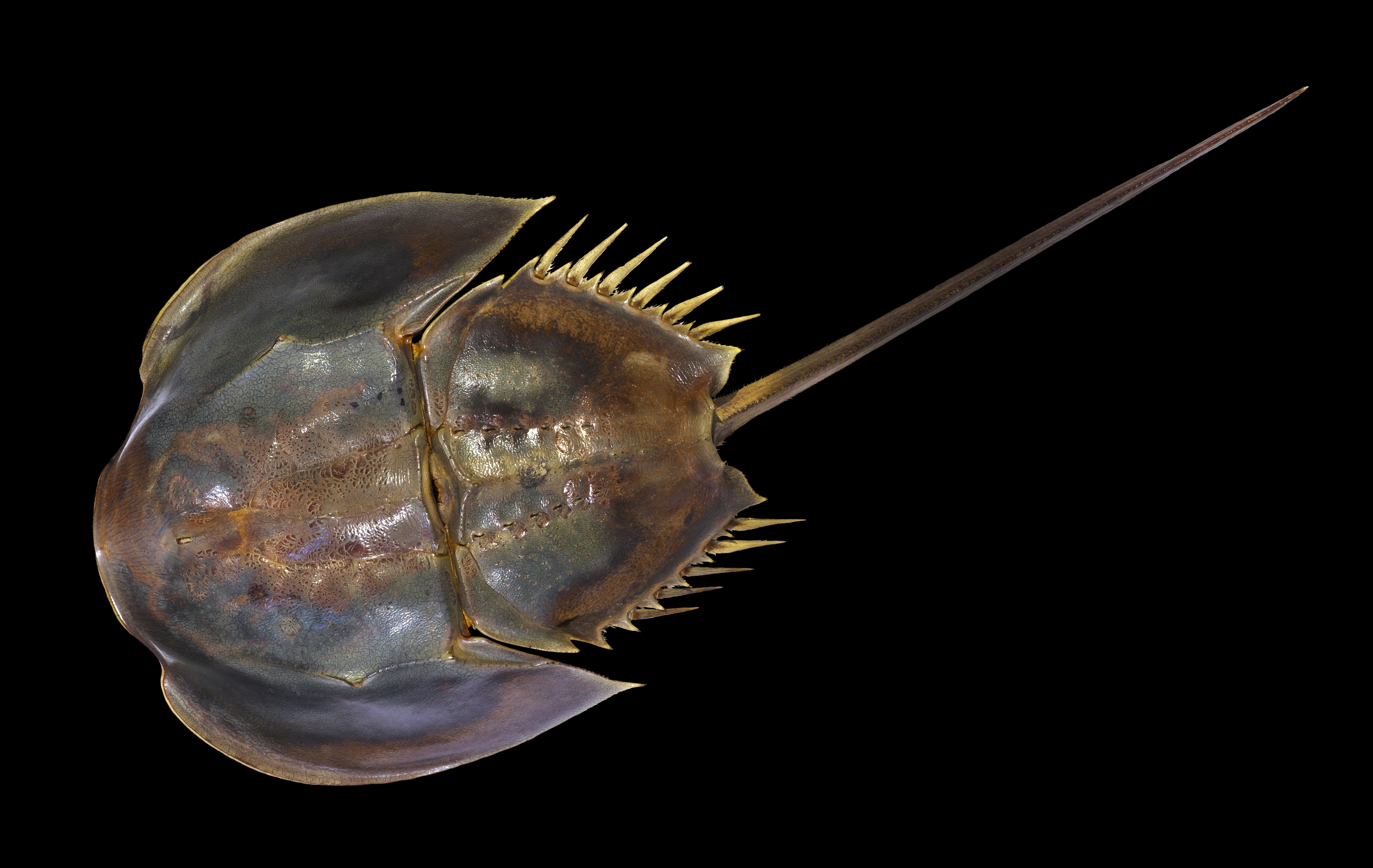
Dorsal

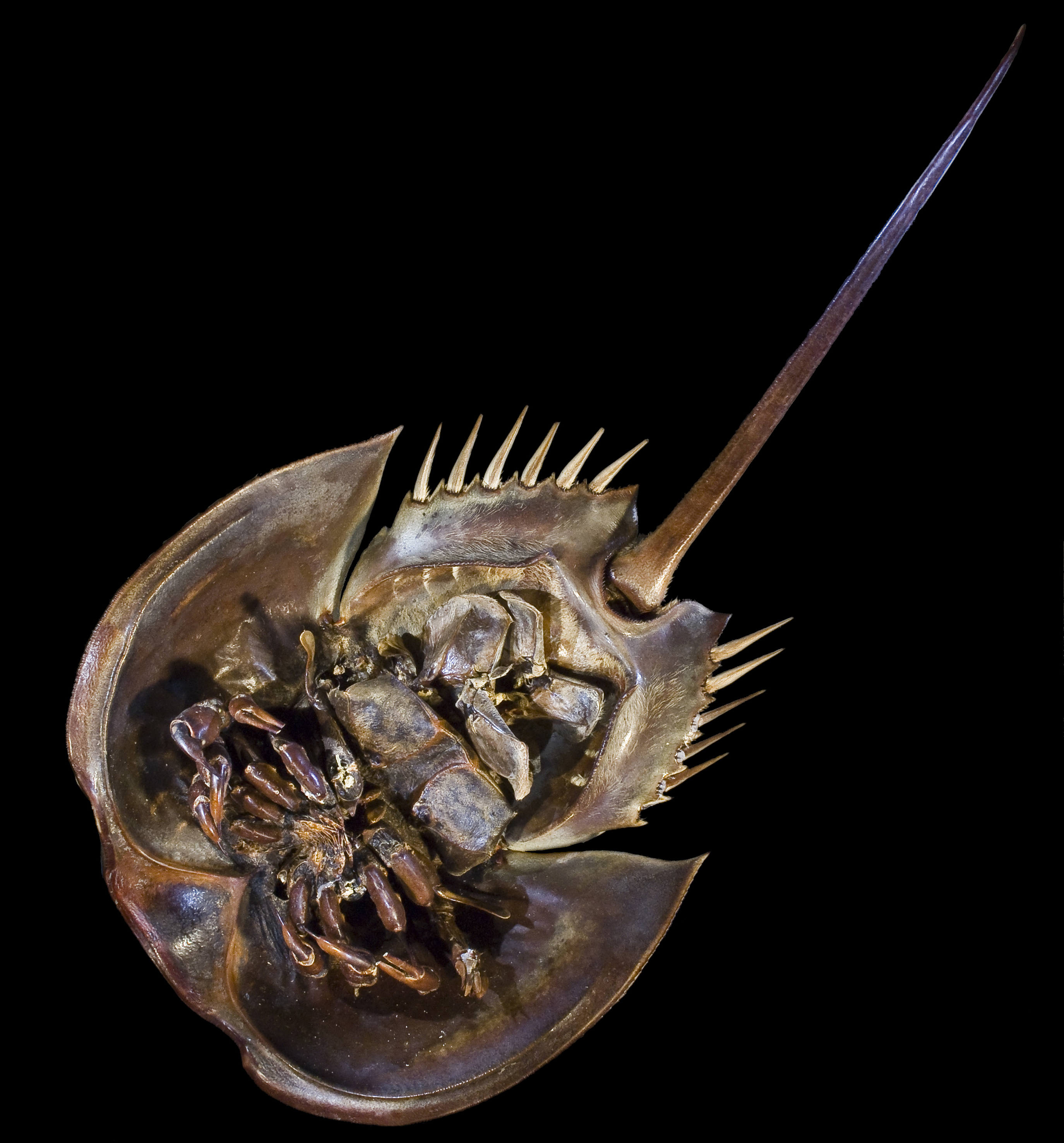
ventral

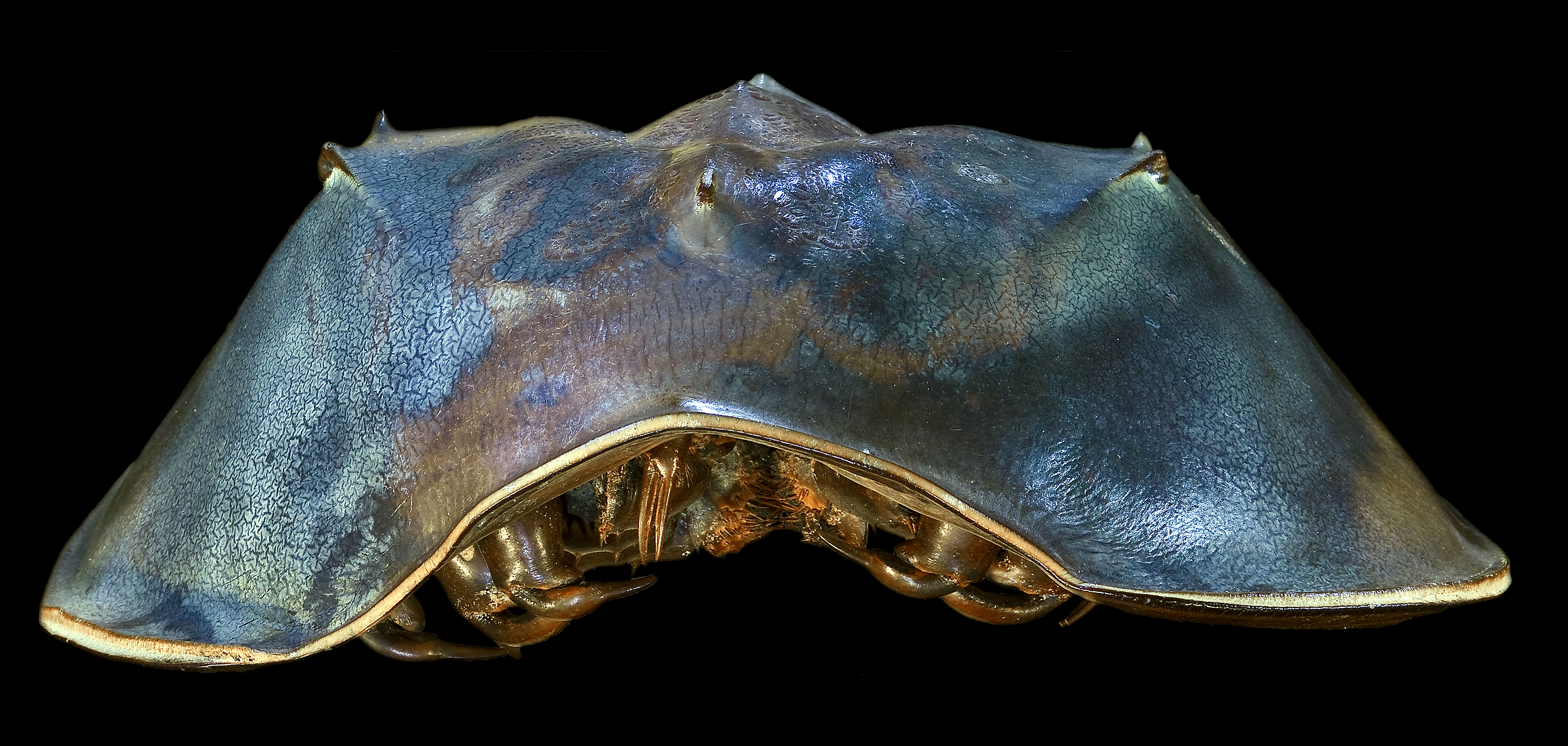
Face

The tri-spine horseshoe crab is the largest of the living horseshoe crab species. Like the other species, females grow larger than males. The largest females of the tri-spine horseshoe crab can be as much as 79.5 cm (31.3 in) long, including their tail. On average in Sabah, Malaysia, females are about 66.5 cm (26.2 in) long, including a tail that is about 34.5 cm (13.6 in), and their carapace (prosoma) is about 31 cm (12 in) wide. In comparison, the average for males is about 54 cm (21 in) long, including a tail that is about 28.5 cm (11.2 in), and their carapace is about 25.5 cm (10.0 in) wide. There are significant geographic variations in the size, but this does not follow a clear north–south or east–west pattern. The largest are from the Kota Kinabalu region in Malaysia where the average carapace width is about 38 cm (15 in) and 28 cm (11 in) in females and males respectively. The smallest are from Zhoushan region in China where the average carapace width is about 24 cm (9.4 in) and 22 cm (8.7 in) in females and males respectively. Intermediate average sizes, ranging from 28 to 33 cm (11–13 in) in females and 23 to 27 cm (9.1–10.6 in) in males, have been reported from Imari in Japan, Xiamen in China, the Philippines, and Manado, Tarakan, Padang and Sibolga in Indonesia. Females typically reach maturity at a carapace width of about 27.5–28 cm (10.8–11.0 in) and males at 22.5–24.5 cm (8.9–9.6 in). Females weigh 1.4–4 kg (3.1–8.8 lb) and males 0.6–1.7 kg (1.3–3.7 lb). In addition to the difference in size, males' two front pairs of walking legs, prosomal appendages two and three, have hooks (they are scissor-like in females) and they have six (three in females) long spines on either side of the rear carapace. Juveniles (both sexes) also have six long spines on either side, similar to adult males. From the eggs hatch to adulthood takes 4 years and involves 15 instar phases (14 moults).

== Juvenile Development ==
Throughout the tri-spine horseshoe crab's life it requires multiple habitats for foraging, spawning and juvenile development. These habitats are shallow waters that have a sandy or muddy substrate, these are usually found near mangrove swamps, high tide zones, and mudflats on coastal beaches. These habitats are endangered due to sea sand mining and infrastructure development which are detrimental to the tri-spined horseshoe crabs development. There are not many studies regarding the habitat loss of tri-spine horseshoe crabs because of their assumed large population size, which once again has not been thoroughly studied.

Juvenile Horseshoe crabs prefer sediments composed of medium size grains with an organic compound ranging from 0.5%-0.7% and a water content ranging from 0.8%-0.9% these qualities increase the survivability of the Horseshoe crab. However, they have been known to nest on manmade aquacultures and beaches. Destruction of mangrove swamps along the coasts and waterways of Southeast Asia to expand rice fields and oil palm plantations has a substantial impact on these horseshoe crabs as they depend on specific organic matter and water content to nest and reproduce, in addition, the mangroves provide shade and cover from predators.

== Ecology ==
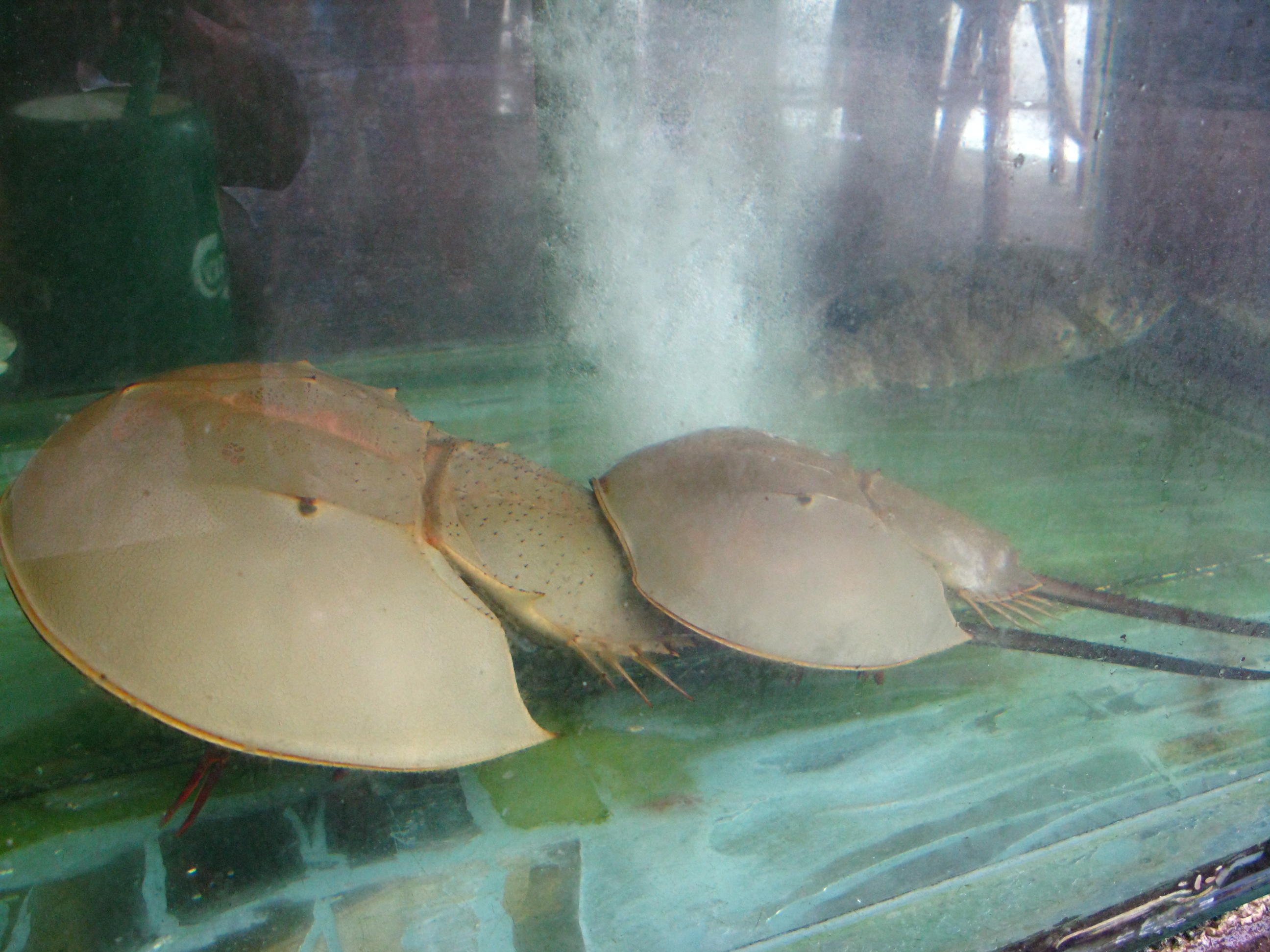
Mating pair, with the smaller male having grasped the larger female

Like other species of horseshoe crabs, T. tridentatus is an omnivore and feeds on molluscs, worms, other benthic invertebrates and algae. Large batches of eggs are laid in holes dug in sandy beaches in special nursery areas off the coast. On hatching, the larvae remain in the nest over winter, feeding on the yolks of their eggs for several months, remaining in this nursery area during the next spring and summer. As juveniles they remain buried in the sediment during high tide, emerging at low tide to feed on the exposed surface. They have limited opportunities to disperse widely. Adults move offshore for the winter, hibernating buried in the seabed at depths of around 20 metres (66 ft), coming inshore again when the water warms up the following year. As a poikilotherm, this horseshoe crab is much affected by rising seawater temperatures, reacting by burying itself deeply in the sediment and sometimes going into diapause.

== Status ==
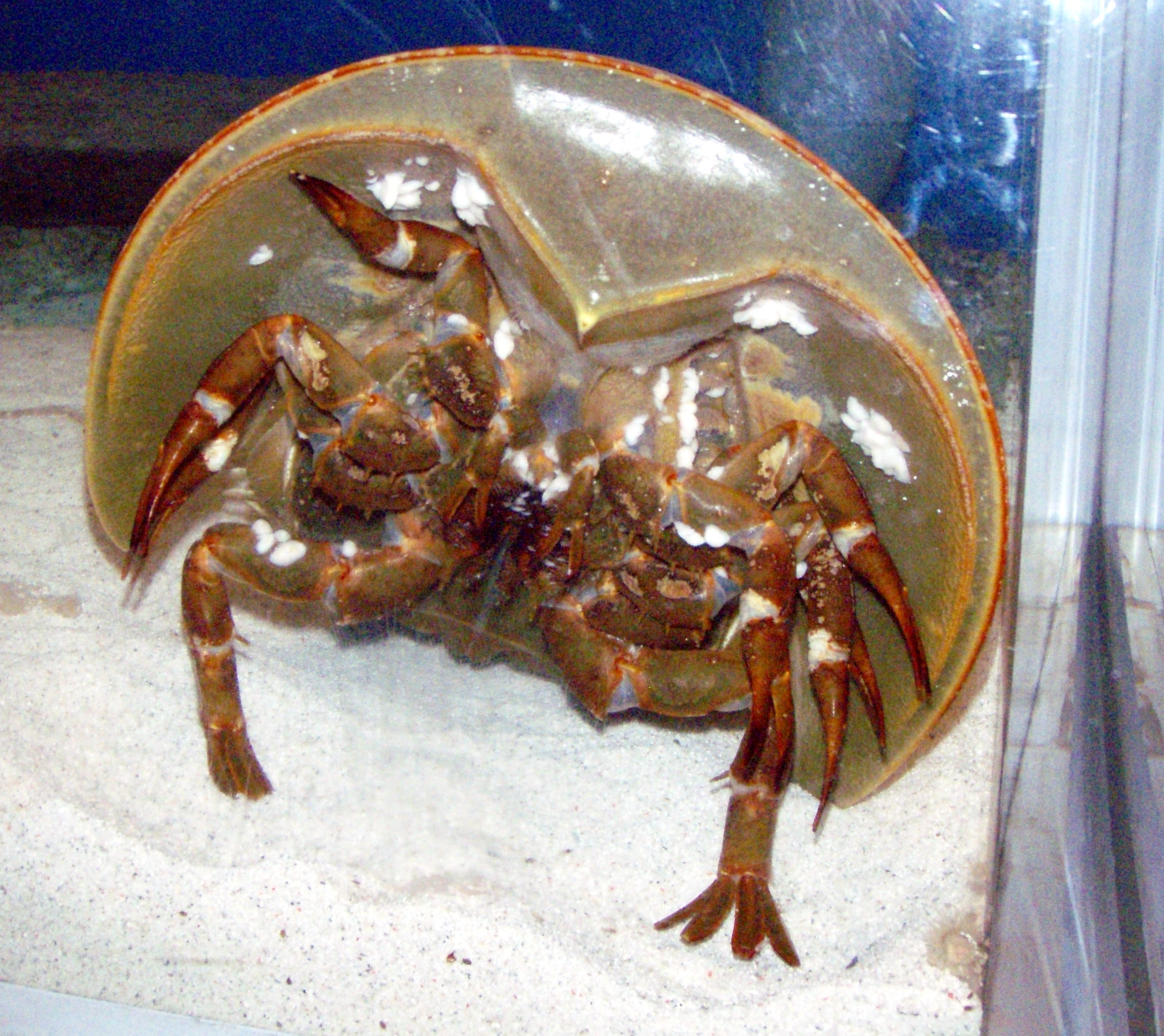
Female

The tri-spine horseshoe crab is at risk from over-fishing, pollution and the loss of their breeding grounds. Populations have declined for decades, and the species was granted protection in Japan in 1928. In China it has become less common and, from being once abundant in Taiwan, it is now seldom seen inshore there. As of 2019, the International Union for Conservation of Nature classifies the species as "Endangered" based on recent population and habitat declines.
