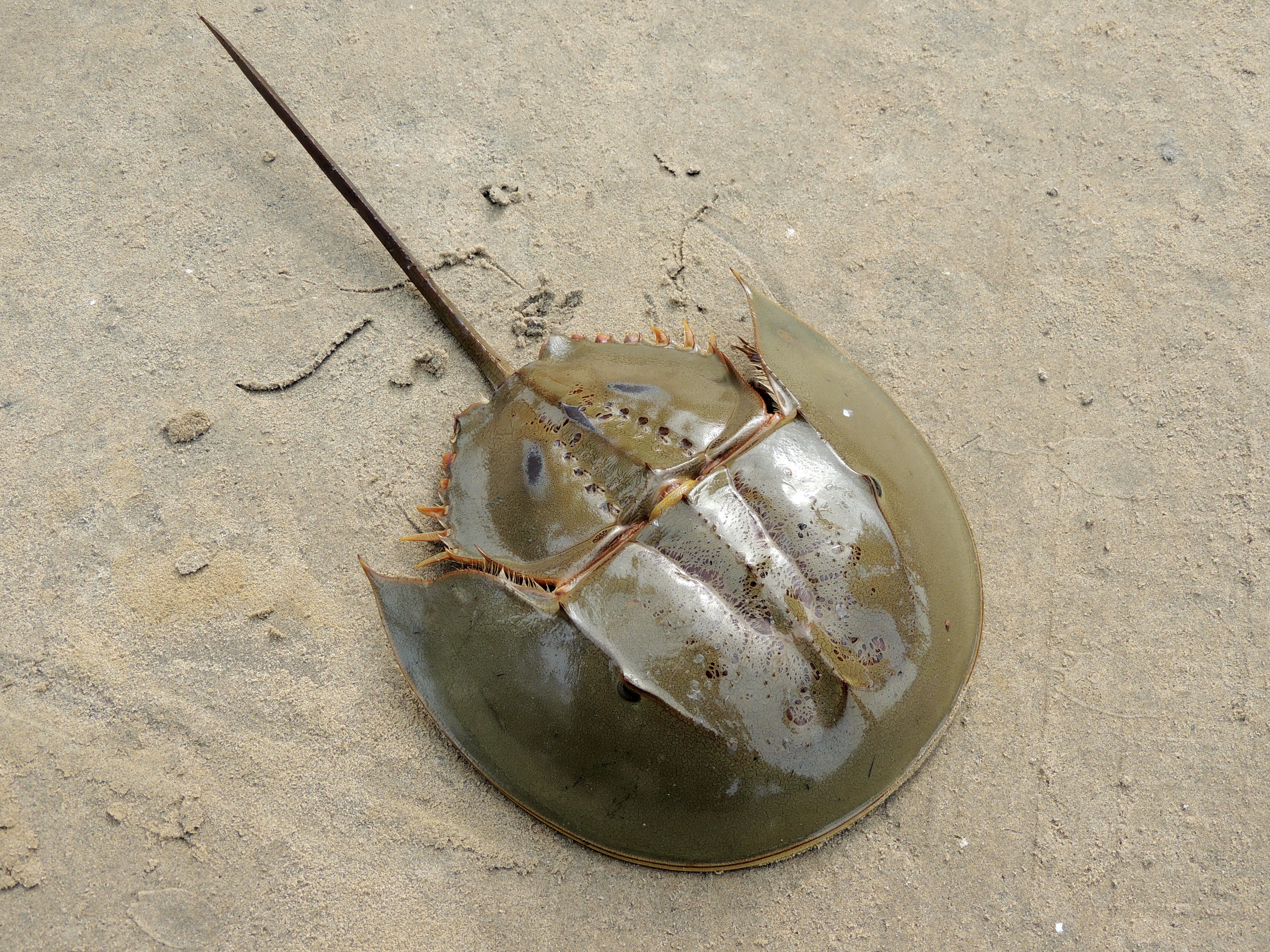
- Tachypleus gigas, one of the four extant species
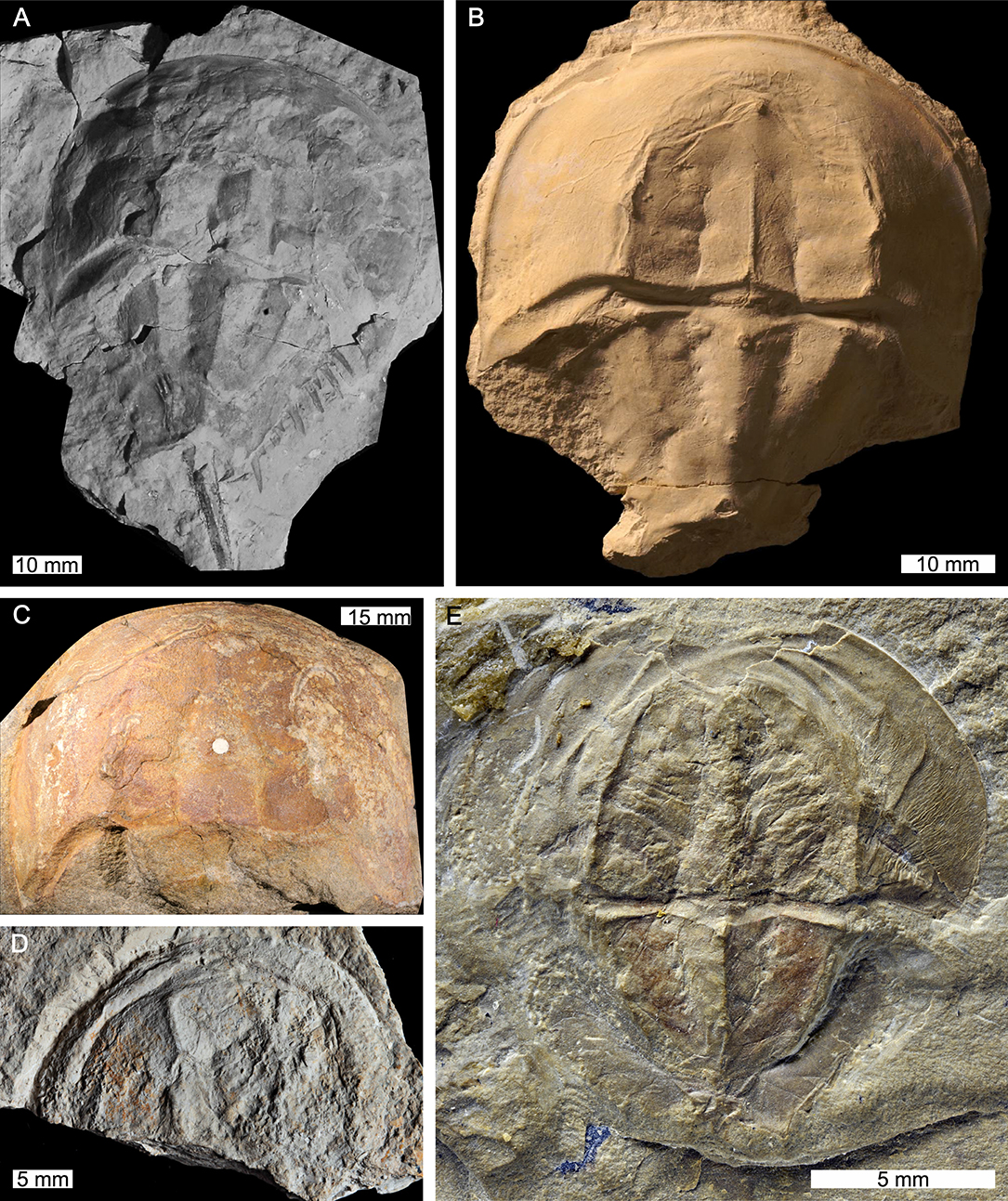
- Jurassic-aged limulids. Crenatolimulus (A, B), Limulus (C), Mesolimulus (D, E)

Scientific classification
- Kingdom: Animalia
- Phylum: Arthropoda
- Subphylum: Chelicerata
- Order: Xiphosura
- Superfamily: Limuloidea
- Family: Limulidae; Leach, 1819

Living genera
- Carcinoscorpius; Limulus; Tachypleus; For fossil genera, see text

= Horseshoe crab =

Limulidae Temporal range: Early Triassic–Present

Family of basal chelicerates

Horseshoe crabs are arthropods of the family Limulidae and the only surviving xiphosurans. Despite their name, they are not crabs or even crustaceans; they are chelicerates, more closely related to arachnids like spiders, ticks, and scorpions. The body of a horseshoe crab is divided into three main parts: the cephalothorax, abdomen, and telson. The largest of these, the cephalothorax, houses most of the animal's eyes, limbs, and internal organs. It is also where the animal gets its name, as its shape somewhat resembles that of a horseshoe. Horseshoe crabs have been described as "living fossils", having changed little since they first appeared in the Triassic around 250 million years ago, and similar-looking fossil xiphosurans extend back to the Ordovician around 445 million years ago.

Only four species of horseshoe crab are extant today, the Atlantic horseshoe crab (Limulus polyphemus), native to the eastern coasts of Mexico and the United States, as well as the mangrove horseshoe crab (Carcinoscorpius rotundicauda), tri-spine horseshoe crab (Tachypleus tridentatus) and Indo-Pacific horseshoe crab (Tachypleus gigas), which are native to South, South East, and East Asia.

Most horseshoe crabs are marine, though the mangrove horseshoe crab is often found in brackish water, and the Atlantic horseshoe crab is resident in brackish estuarine ecosystems, such as the Delaware and Chesapeake bays. Additionally, certain extinct species transitioned to living solely in freshwater. Horseshoe crabs primarily live at the water's bottom but they can swim if needed.

Horseshoe crabs are often caught for their blood, which contains Limulus amebocyte lysate, a chemical used to detect bacterial endotoxins. Additionally, they are used as fishing bait in the United States and eaten as a delicacy in some parts of Asia. In recent years, horseshoe crabs have experienced a population decline. This is mainly due to coastal habitat destruction and overharvesting. To ensure their continued existence, many areas have enacted regulations on harvesting and established captive breeding programs.

External videos
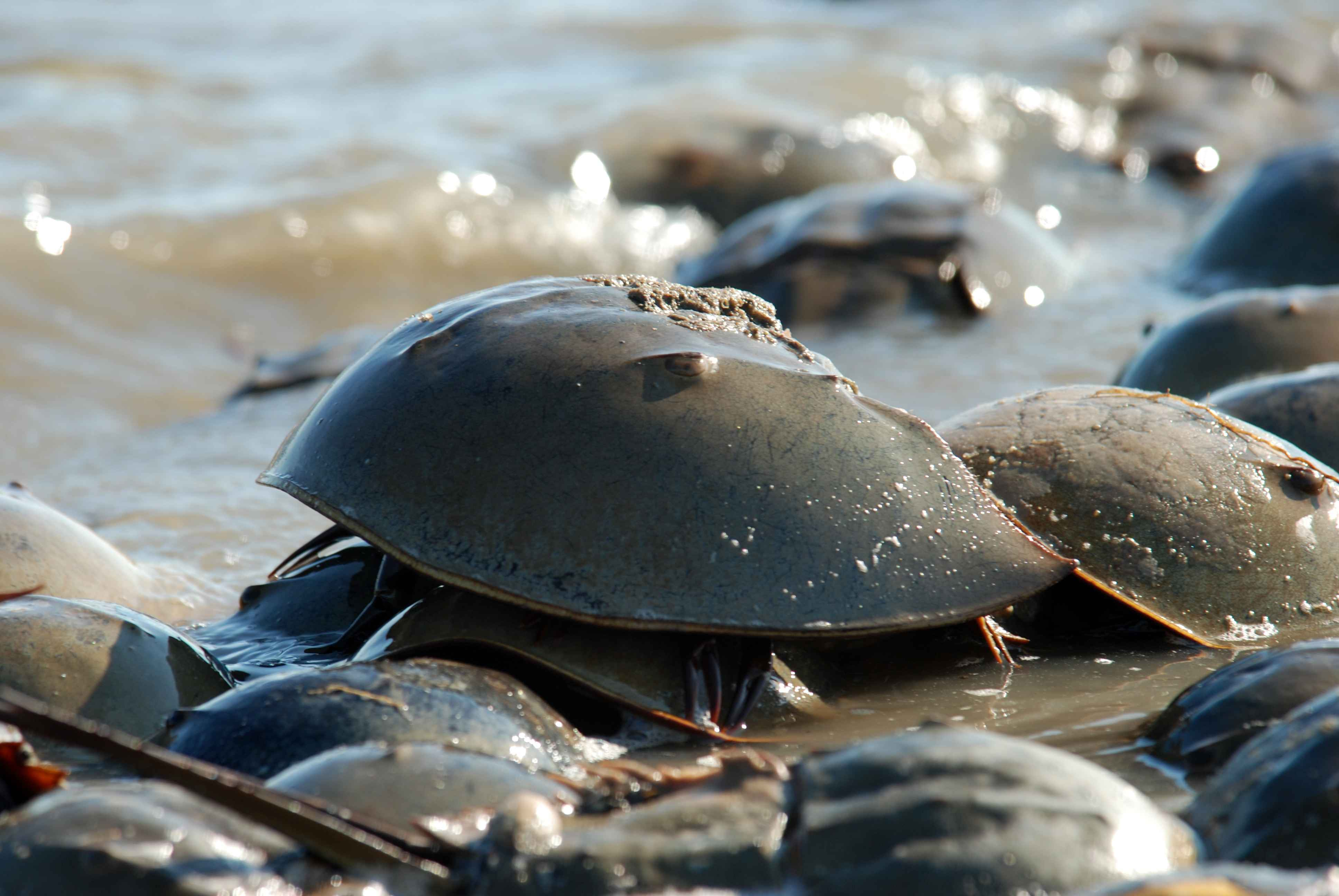
- Rendezvous with a Horseshoe Crab, August 2011, 4:34, NewsWorks
- The Horseshoe Crab Spawn, June 2010, 5:08, HostOurCoast.com
- Horseshoe Crabs Mate in Massive Beach "Orgy", June 2014, 3:29, National Geographic

== Phylogeny and evolution ==
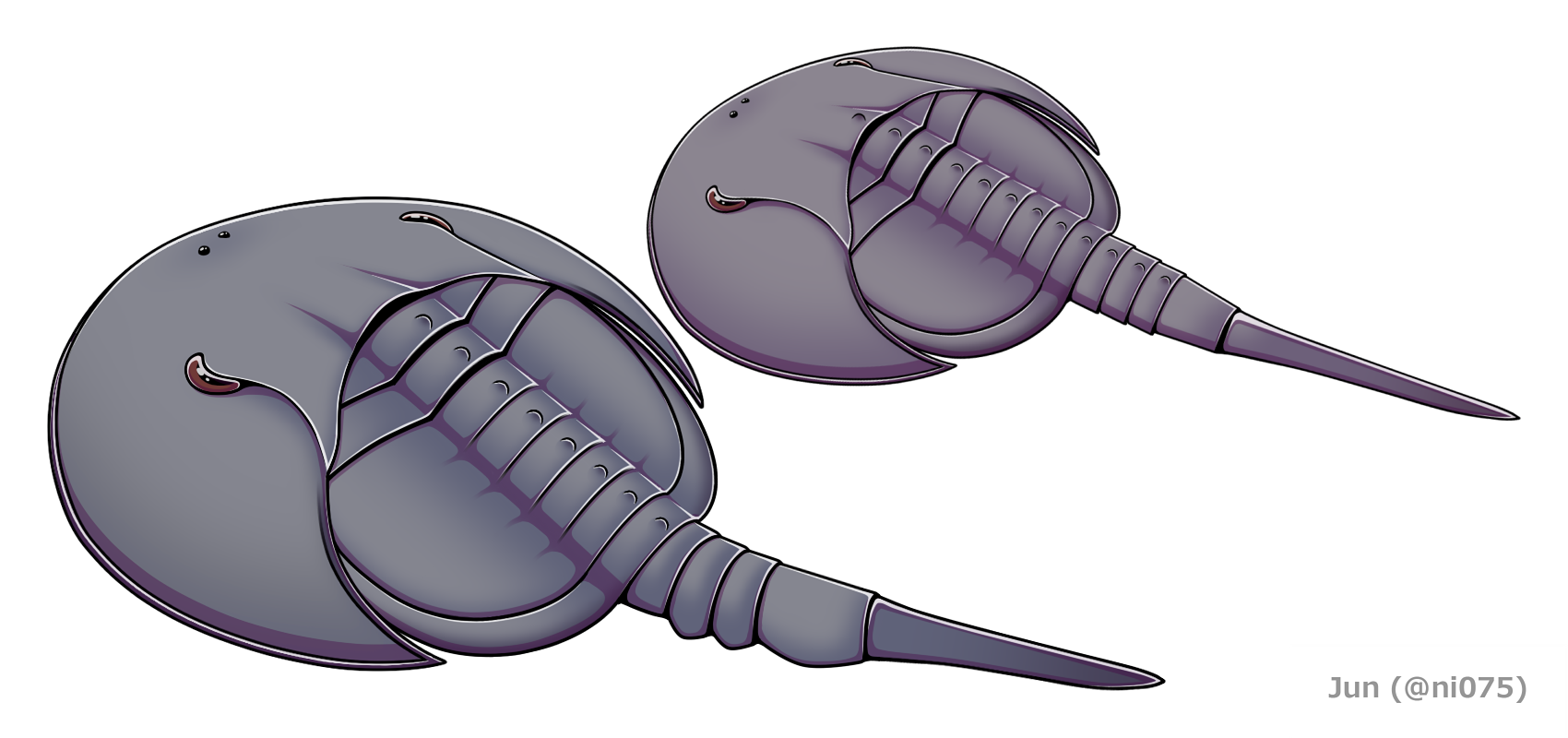
Life restoration of Lunataspis, a xiphosuran (early relative of horseshoe crabs) from the Ordovician, around 445 million years ago, which already bears a close resemblance to living horseshoe crabs

The fossil record of Xiphosura, the broader group that includes horseshoe crabs and their extinct relatives, extends back to the Early Ordovician, around 480 million years ago. Ordovician xiphosurans, such as Lunataspis, already bear a close resemblance to living horseshoe crabs. The earliest appearance of modern horseshoe crabs was approximately 250 million years ago during the Early Triassic. Because they have seen little morphological change since then, extant (surviving) forms have been described as "living fossils".

Horseshoe crabs resemble crustaceans but belong to a separate subphylum of the arthropods, Chelicerata. Horseshoe crabs are closely related to the extinct eurypterids (sea scorpions), which include some of the largest arthropods ever to have existed, and the two may be sister groups. The difficult-to-classify chasmataspidids are also thought to be closely related to horseshoe crabs.

The radiation of horseshoe crabs resulted in 22 known species, of which only 4 remain. The Atlantic species is sister to the three Asian species, the latter of which are likely the result of two divergences relatively close in time. The last common ancestor of the four extant species is estimated to have lived about 135 million years ago in the Cretaceous.

Limulidae is the only extant family of the order Xiphosura, and contains all four living species of horseshoe crabs:

- Carcinoscorpius rotundicauda, the mangrove horseshoe crab, found in South and Southeast Asia
- Limulus polyphemus, the Atlantic or American horseshoe crab, found along the Atlantic coast of the United States and the Southeast Gulf of Mexico
- Tachypleus gigas, the Indo-Pacific, Indonesian, Indian, or southern horseshoe crab, found in South and Southeast Asia
- Tachypleus tridentatus, the Chinese, Japanese, or tri-spine horseshoe crab, found in Southeast and East Asia

=== Genera ===
After Bicknell et al. 2021 and Lamsdell et al. 2020

- Incertae sedis
  - †Albalimulus? Bicknell & Pates, 2019 Ballagan Formation, Scotland, Early Carboniferous (Tournaisian) (Considered Xiphosura incertae sedis by Lamsdell, 2020)
  - †Casterolimulus Holland, Erickson & O'Brien, 1975 Late Cretaceous (Maastrichtian) Fox Hills Formation, North Dakota, USA (Inconsistently placed in this family)
  - †Heterolimulus gadeai Vıa & Villalta, 1966 Alcover Limestone Formation, Spain, Middle Triassic (Ladinian)
  - †Limulitella? Størmer, 1952 Middle-Upper Triassic, France, Germany, Tunisia, Russia
  - †Sloveniolimulus Bicknell et al., 2019 Strelovec Formation, Slovenia Middle Triassic (Anisian)
  - †Tarracolimulus Romero & Vıa Boada, 1977 Alcover Limestone Formation, Spain, Middle Triassic (Ladinian)
  - †Victalimulus Riek & Gill, 1971 Lower Cretaceous (Aptian) Korumburra Group, NSW, Australia
  - †Yunnanolimulus Zhang et al., 2009 Middle Triassic (Anisian), Guanling Formation, Yunnan, China
  - †Mesolimulus Middle Triassic-Late Cretaceous England, Spain, Siberia, Germany, Morocco
  - †Ostenolimulus Lamsdell et al. 2021 Early Jurassic (Sinemurian) Moltrasio Limestone, Italy
  - †Volanalimulus Lamsdell, 2020 Early Triassic, Madagascar.
- Subfamily Limulinae Leach, 1819
  - †Crenatolimulus Feldmann et al., 2011 Upper Jurassic (upper Tithonian) Kcynia Formation, Poland. Lower Cretaceous (Albian) Glen Rose Formation, Texas, USA
  - Limulus O. F. Müller, 1785 Pierre Shale, United States, Late Cretaceous (Maastrichtian), Atlantic North America, Recent
- Subfamily Tachypleinae Pocock, 1902
  - Carcinoscorpius Pocock, 1902, Asia, Recent
  - Tachypleus Leach, 1819 Upper Cretaceous (Cenomanian) Haqel and Hjoula Konservat-Lagerstatten, Lebanon, Upper Eocene Domsen Sands, Germany, Asia, Recent

=== Phylogeny ===
The horseshoe crab's position within Chelicerata is complicated. However, most morphological analyses have placed them outside the Arachnida. This assumption was challenged when a genetics-based phylogeny found horseshoe crabs to be the sister group to the ricinuleids, thereby making them an arachnid. In response, a more recent paper has again placed horseshoe crabs as separate from the arachnids. This new study utilized both new and more complete sequencing data while also sampling a larger number of taxa.

Below is a cladogram showing the internal relationships of Limulidae (modern horseshoe crabs) based on morphology. It contains both extant and extinct members.

- Limulidae
  - Yunnanolimulus
    - † Yunnanolimulus henkeli
    - † Yunnanolimulus luopingensis
  - - † Tarracolimulus rieki
    - - - † Keuperlimulus vicensis
        - - - † Allolimulus woodwardi
            - - † Casterolimulus kletti
              - † Victalimulus mcqueeni
          - Mesolimulus
            - † Mesolimulus crespelli
            - - † Mesolimulus sibiricus
              - - † Mesolimulus tafraoutensis
                - † Mesolimulus walchi
      - - Limulinae
          - Crenatolimulus
            - † Crenatolimulus darwini
            - † Crenatolimulus paluxyensis
          - - † Limulus coffini
            - Limulus polyphemus
        - - † Volanalimulus madagascarensis
          - - † Heterolimulus gadeai
            - Tachypleinae
              - Carcinoscorpius rotundicauda
              - Tachypleus
                - - † Tachypleus decheni
                  - Tachypleus gigas
                - - † Tachypleus syriacus
                  - Tachypleus tridentatus

=== Whole genome duplication ===
The common ancestor of arachnids and xiphosurans (the group that includes horseshoe crabs) underwent a whole-genome duplication (WGD) event. This was followed by at least two, possibly three, WGDs in a common ancestor of the living horseshoe crabs. This gives them unusually large genomes for invertebrates (the genomes of C. rotundicauda and T. tridentatus being approximately 1.72 Gb each). Evidence for the duplication events includes similarity in structure between chromosomes (synteny), and clustering of homeobox genes. Over time, many of the duplicated genes have changed through processes of neofunctionalization or subfunctionalization, meaning their functions are different from what they originally were.

=== Evolution of sexual size dimorphism ===
Several hypotheses have been given as possible reasons why a size difference exists between male and female horseshoe crabs. This phenomenon is known as sexual size dimorphism and results in the females having a larger average size than males. The existence of this trend is likely due to a combination of two things:

1. First, females take a year longer to mature and undergo an additional molt, giving them a larger average body size.
2. Second, larger female horseshoe crabs can house more eggs within their bodies. This lets them pass on more genetic material than smaller females during each mating cycle, making larger females more prevalent.

== Anatomy and physiology ==
=== General body plan ===
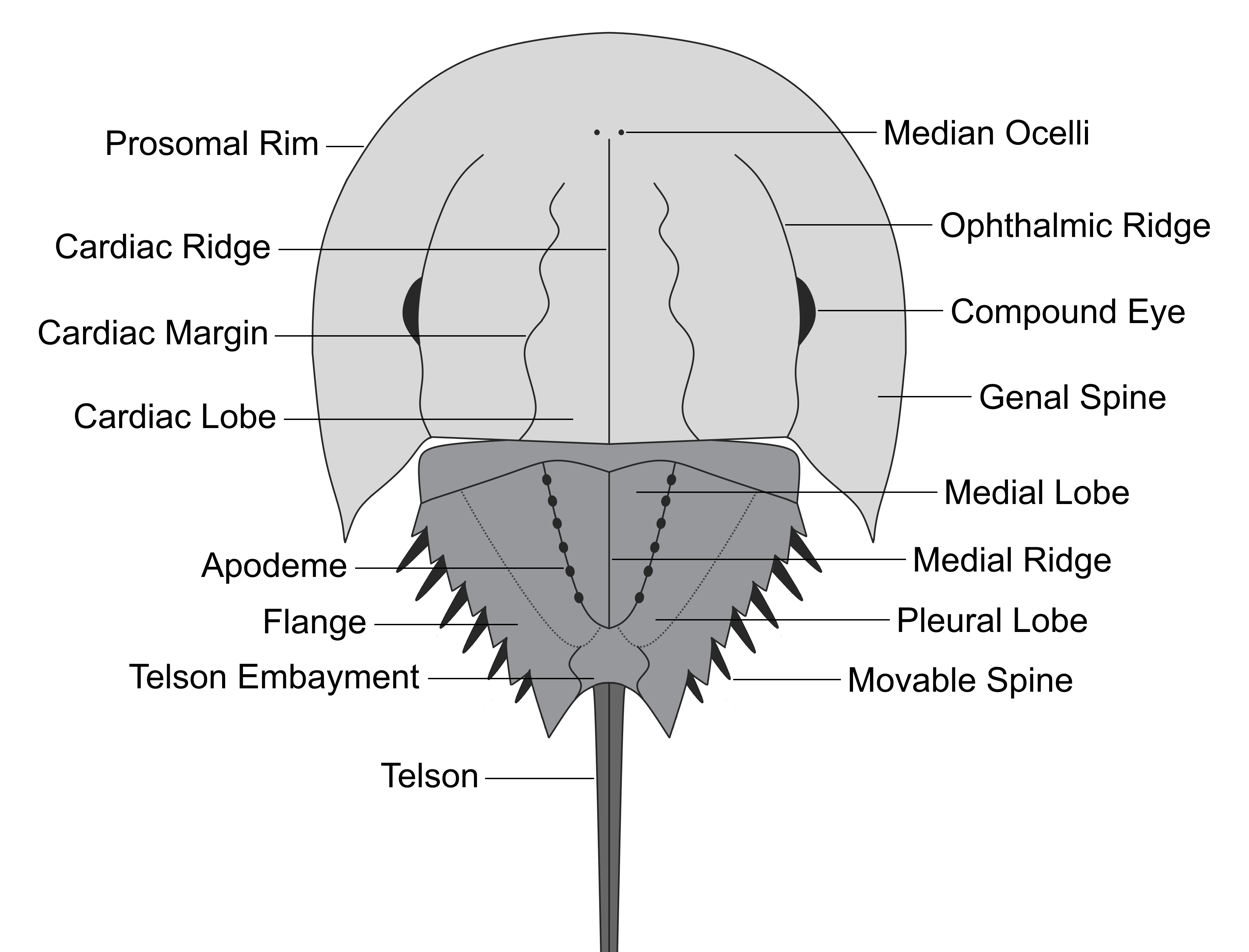
Generalized dorsal anatomy of a horseshoe crab

Like all arthropods, horseshoe crabs have segmented bodies with jointed limbs, which are covered by a protective cuticle made of chitin. They have heads composed of several segments, which eventually fuse as an embryo.

Horseshoe crabs are chelicerates, meaning their bodies are composed of two main parts (tagmata): the cephalothorax and the opisthosoma. The first tagma, the cephalothorax or prosoma, is a fusion of the head and thorax. This tagma is also covered by a large, semicircular carapace that acts as a shield around the animal's body. It is shaped like the hoof of a horse, giving this animal its common name. In addition to the two main tagmata, the horseshoe crab also possesses a long tail-like section known as the telson.

In total, horseshoe crabs have 6 pairs of appendages on their cephalothorax. The first of these are the chelicerae, which give chelicerates their name. In horseshoe crabs, these look like tiny pincers in front of the mouth. Behind the chelicerae are the pedipalps, which are primarily used as legs. In the final molt of males, the ends of the pedipalps are modified into specialized, grasping claws used in mating. Following the pedipalps are three pairs of walking legs and a set of pusher legs for moving through soft sediment. Each of these pusher legs is biramous or divided into two separate branches. The branch closest to the front bears a flat end that looks like a leaf. This end is called the flabellum. The branch towards the back is far longer and looks similar to a walking leg. However, rather than ending in just a claw, the back branch has four leaf-like ends that are arranged like a petal. The final segment of the cephalothorax was originally part of the abdomen but fused in the embryo. On it are two flap-like appendages known as chilaria. If severed from the body, lost legs or the telson may slowly regenerate, and cracks in the body shell can heal.

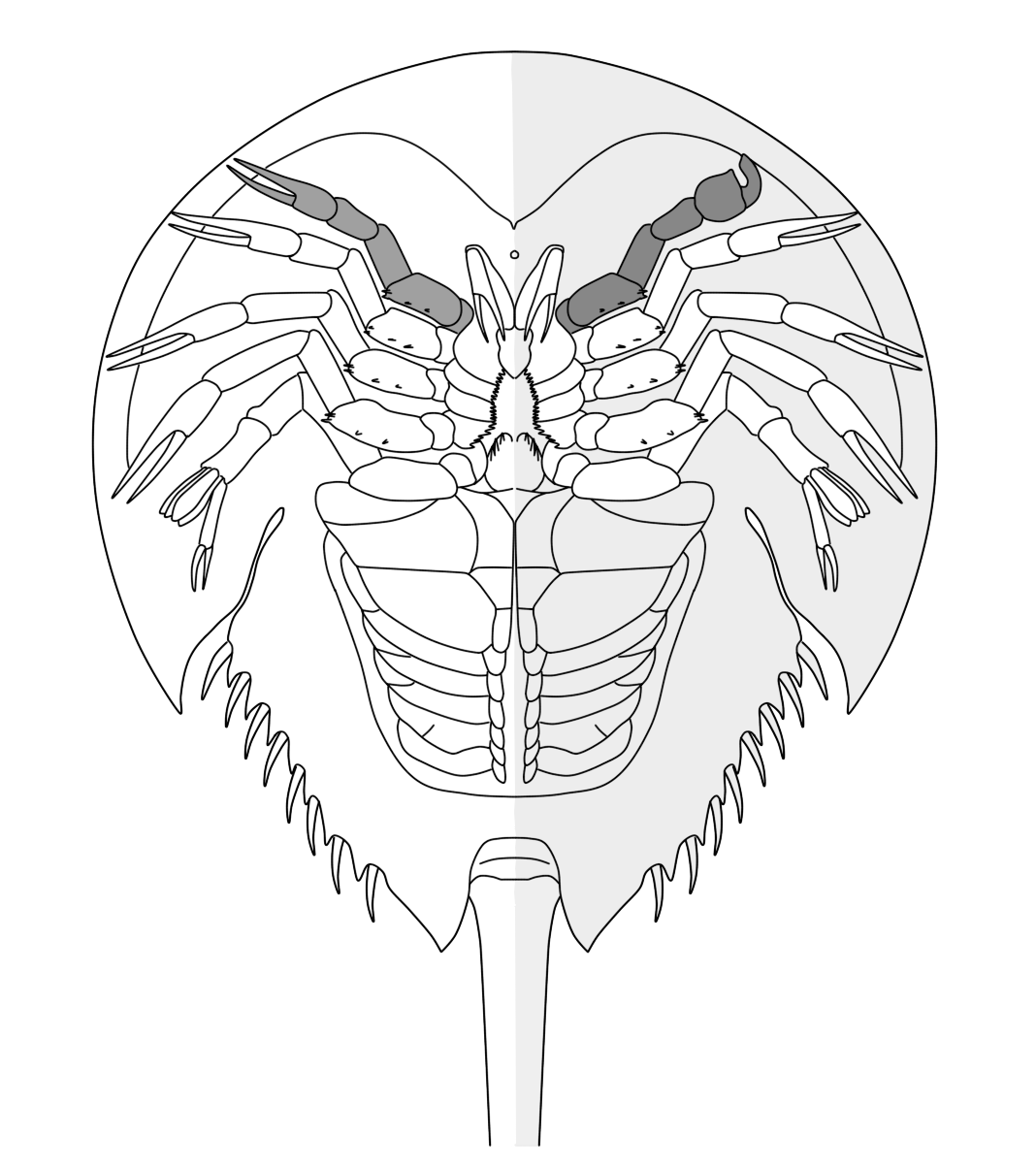
Difference between the pedipalps of male (right) and female (left) horseshoe crabs. Pedipalps are highlighted in grey.

The opisthosoma or abdomen of a horseshoe crab is composed of several fused segments. Similar to a trilobite, the abdomen is made up of three lobes: a medial lobe in the middle, and a pleural lobe on either side. Attached to the perimeter of each pleural lobe is a flat, serrated structure known as the flange. The flange on either side is connected by the telson embayment, which itself is attached to the medial lobe. Along the line where these lobes meet are six sets of indentations known as apodeme. Each of these serves as a muscle attachment point for the animal's twelve movable spines.

On the underside of the abdomen are several biramous limbs. The branches closest to the outside are flat and broad, while the ones on the inside are more narrow. Closest to the front is a plate-like structure made of two fused appendages. This is the genital operculum and is where horseshoe crabs keep their reproductive organs. Following the operculum are five pairs of book gills. While mainly used for breathing, horseshoe crabs can also use their book gills to swim. At the end of a horseshoe crab's abdomen is a long, tail-like spine known as a telson. It is highly mobile and serves a variety of functions.

=== Nervous system ===
==== Eyes ====
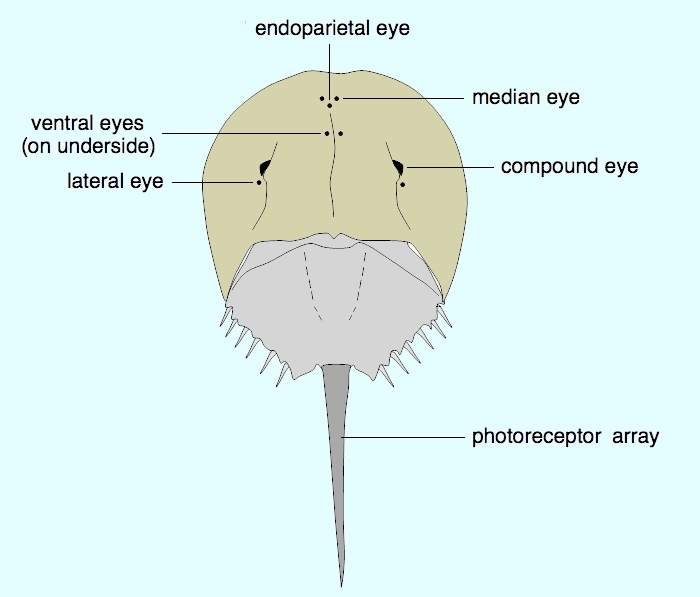
Horseshoe crabs have two primary compound eyes and seven secondary simple eyes. Two of the secondary eyes are on the underside.

Horseshoe crabs have a variety of eyes that provide them with useful visual information. The most obvious of these are two large compound eyes found on top of the carapace. This feature is unusual, as all other living chelicerates have lost them in their evolution. In adult horseshoe crabs, the compound eyes comprise around 1,000 individual units known as ommatidia. Each ommatidium is made up of a ring of retinal and pigment cells that surround something known as the eccentric cell. This secondary visual cell gets its name from the way it behaves. The eccentric cell is coupled with the dendrites of normal retinal cells so that when a normal cell depolarizes in the presence of light, the eccentric cell does too.

A horseshoe crab's compound eyes are less complex and organized than those of most other arthropods. Ommatidia are arranged messily in what's been deemed an "imperfect hexagonal array" and have a highly variable number of photoreceptors (between 4 and 20) in their retina. Although each ommatidium typically has one eccentric cell, there are sometimes two, and occasionally more. All the eye's photoreceptors, both rods and cones, have a single visual pigment with a peak absorption of around 525 nanometers. This differs from insects or decapod crustaceans, as their photoreceptors are sensitive to different spectrums of light. Horseshoe crabs have relatively poor vision, and to compensate for that, have the largest rods and cones of any known animal, about 100 times the size of humans'. Furthermore, their eyes are a million times more sensitive to light at night than during the day.

At the front of the animal along the cardiac ridge are a pair of eyes known as median ocelli. Their retina is even less organized than those of the compound eyes having between 5 and 11 photoreceptors paired with one or two secondary visual cells called arhabdomeric cells. Arhabdomeric cells are equivalent to eccentric cells as they function identically. The median ocelli are unique due to having two distinct visual pigments. While the first functions similarly to the pigment in the compound eyes, the second has a peak absorption of around 360 nanometers, allowing the animal to see ultraviolet light.

Other, more rudimentary eyes in horseshoe crabs include the endoparietal ocelli, the two lateral ocelli, two ventral ocelli, and a cluster of photoreceptors on the abdomen and telson. The endoparietal, lateral, and ventral ocelli are very similar to the median ocelli, except like the compound eyes, they only see in visual light with a peak absorbance of around 525 nanometers. The endoparietal eye further differs due to being a fusion of two separate ocelli. This eye is found not far behind the median eyes and sits directly on the cardiac ridge. The two ventral ocelli are located on the underside of the cephalothorax near the mouth and likely help to orient the animal when walking around or swimming. The lateral eyes can be found directly behind the compound eyes and become functional just before horseshoe crab larvae hatch. The telson's photoreceptors are unique as they're spaced throughout the structure rather than located in a fixed spot. Together with UV-seeing median ocelli, these photoreceptors have been found to influence the animal's circadian rhythm.

=== Circulation and respiration ===
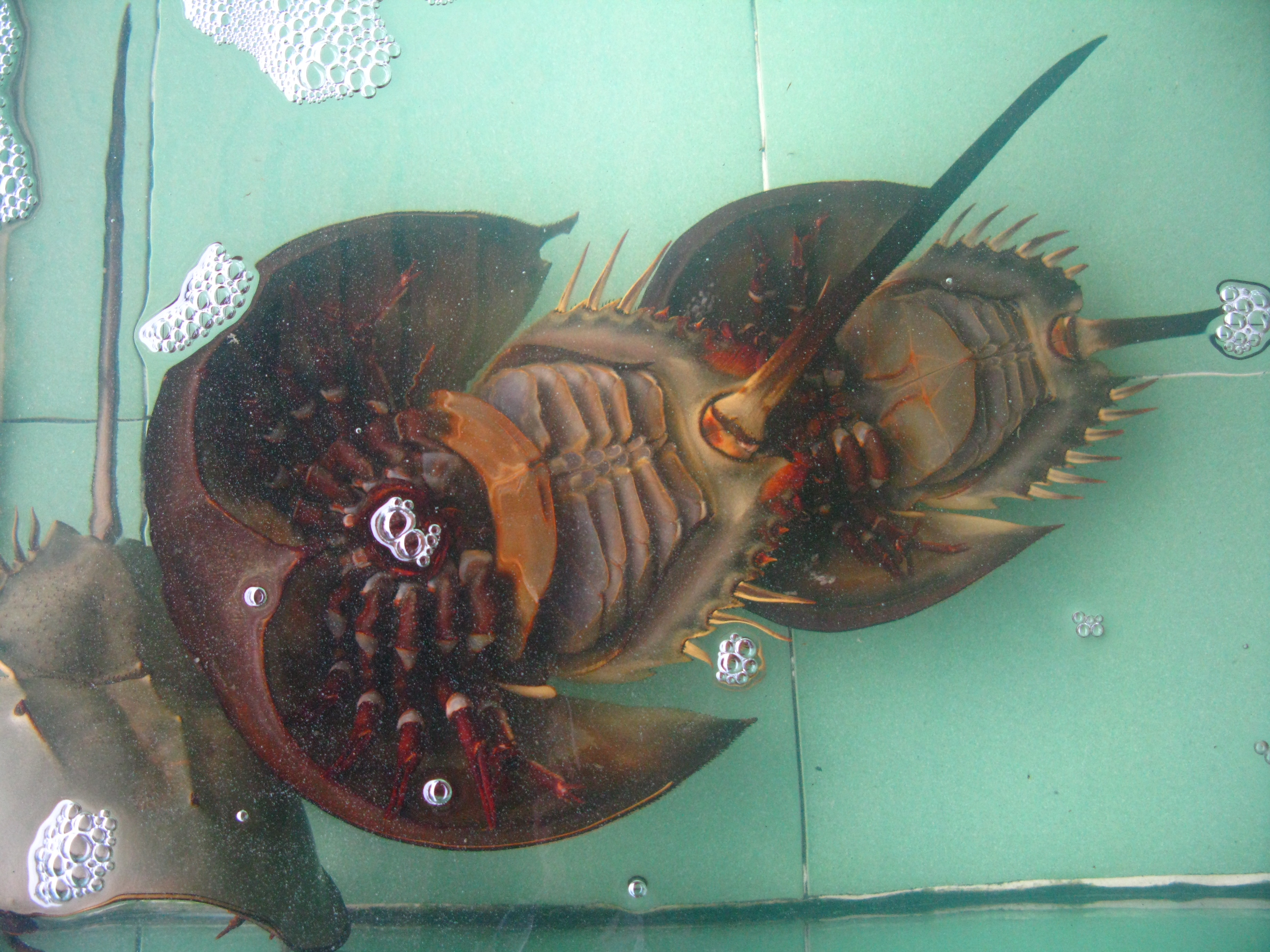
Underside of two horseshoe crabs, showing the legs and book gills

Like all arthropods, horseshoe crabs have an open circulatory system. This means that instead of using a system of closed-off veins and arteries, gasses are transported through a cavity called the hemocoel. The hemocoel contains hemolymph, a fluid that fills all parts of the cavity and serves as the animal's blood. Rather than using iron-based hemoglobin, horseshoe crabs transport oxygen with a copper-based protein called hemocyanin, giving its blood a bright blue color. The blood also contains two types of cells: amebocytes that are utilized in clotting, and cyanocytes that create hemocyanin.

Horseshoe crabs pump blood with a long, tubular heart located in the middle of their body. Like the hearts of vertebrates, the hearts of these animals have two separate states: a state of contraction known as systole, and a state of relaxation known as diastole. At the beginning of systole, blood leaves the heart through a large artery known as the aorta and numerous arteries parallel to the heart. Next, the arteries dump blood into large cavities of the hemocoel surrounding the animal's tissues. Larger cavities lead to smaller cavities, allowing the hemocoel to oxygenate all the animal's tissues. During diastole, blood flows from the hemocoel to a cavity known as the pericardial sinus. From there, blood re-enters the heart and the cycle begins again.

Horseshoe crabs breathe through modified swimming appendages beneath their abdomen known as book gills. While they appear smooth on the outside, the insides of these book gills are lined with several thin "pages" called lamellae. Each lamella is hollow and contains an extension of hemocoel, allowing gasses to diffuse between a horseshoe crab's blood and external environment. There are roughly 80–200 lamellae in each gill, with all ten gills giving the animal a total breathing surface area of about two square meters. When underwater, the lamellae are routinely aerated by rhythmic movement of the book gills. These movements create a current that enters through two gaps between the cephalothorax and abdomen and exits on either side of the telson.

=== Feeding, digestion, and excretion ===
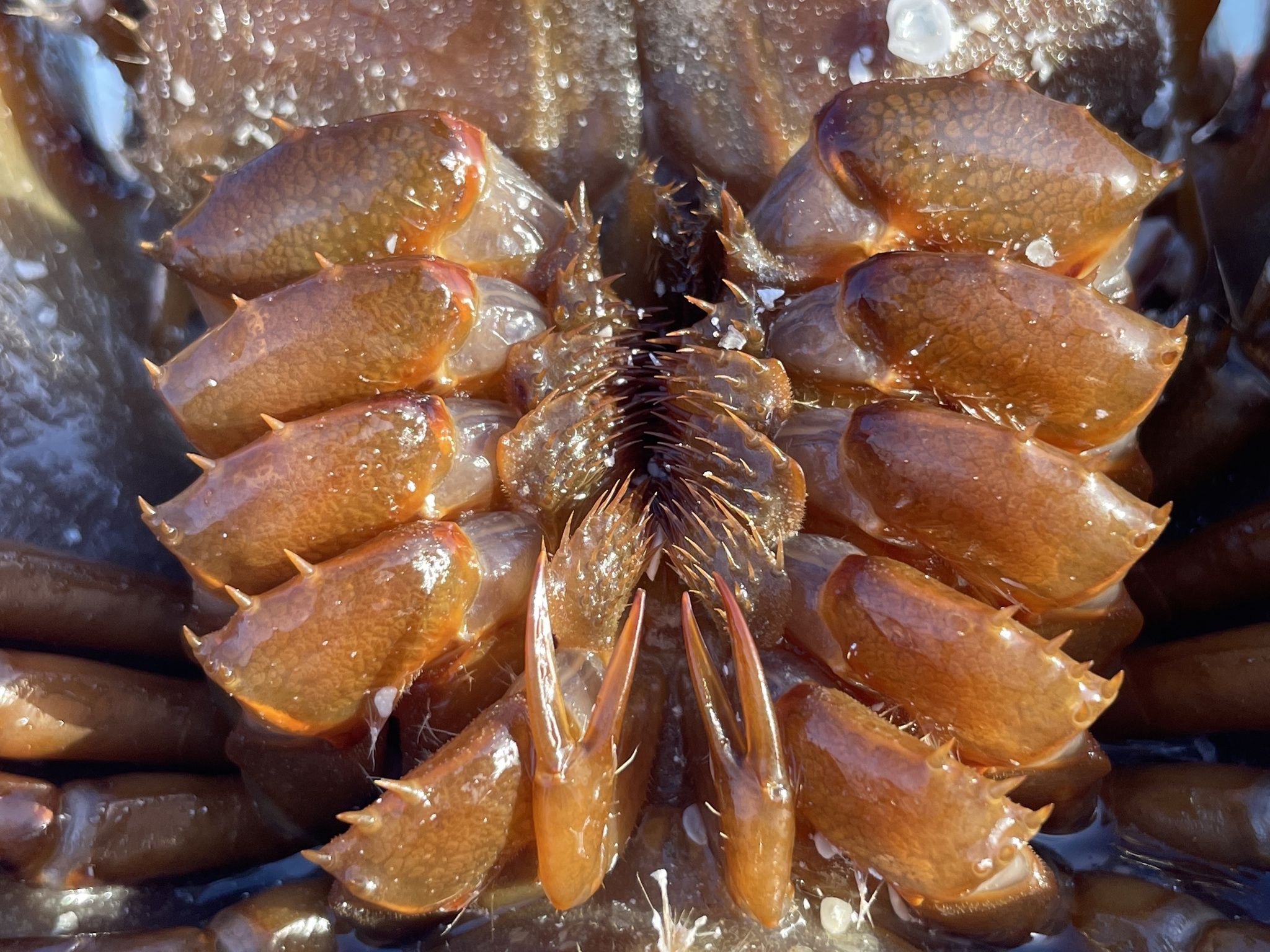
Gnathobases, food groove, and chelicerae

Horseshoe crabs first break up their food using bristles known as gnathobases located at the coxa, or base, of their walking limbs. Gnathobases on the right and left legs form a cavity known as the food groove that begins near the pusher legs and extends to the animal's mouth. The end of the groove is closed off by the animal's chilaria. To break up any food, each pair of coxa moves in the opposite direction parallel to the ones in front of and behind it. This motion happens while feeding and walking, pushing food towards the mouth. Horseshoe crabs catch soft prey with claws on their second to fifth legs and place them in the food groove to be ground up. For harder prey, horseshoe crabs use a pair of stout, cuspid gnathobases (informally known as "nutcrackers") on the back of their sixth legs. After the food is sufficiently torn up, it is moved by the chelicerae into the mouth for further digestion.

Horseshoe crabs are some of the only living chelicerates with guts that can process solid food. Its digestive system is J-shaped, lined with a cuticle, and can be divided into three main sections: the foregut, midgut, and hindgut. The foregut is contained in the animal's cephalothorax and comprises the esophagus, crop, and gizzard. The esophagus moves food from the mouth to the crop where it is stored before entering the gizzard. The gizzard is a muscular, toothed organ that serves to pulverize the food from the crop and regurgitate any indigestible particles. The foregut terminates in the pyloric valve and sphincter, a muscular door of sorts that separates it from the midgut.

The midgut is composed of a short stomach, a long intestinal tube. Connected to the stomach are a pair of large, sack-like digestive ceca known as hepatopancreases. These ceca fill most of the cephalothoracic and abdominal hemocoel and are where most digestion and nutrient absorption takes place. Before and following digestion, the midgut lining (epithelium) secretes a peritrophic membrane made of chitin and mucoproteins that surrounds the food and later the feces.

Horseshoe crabs excrete waste through both their book gills and hindgut. Similar to many aquatic animals, horseshoe crabs have an ammonotelic metabolism and eliminate ammonia and other small toxins through diffusion with their gills. After being processed in the midgut, waste is passed into a muscular tube known as the hindgut or rectum and then excreted from a sphincter known as the anus. Externally, this opening is located on the bottom side of the animal right below its telson.

== Distribution and habitat ==
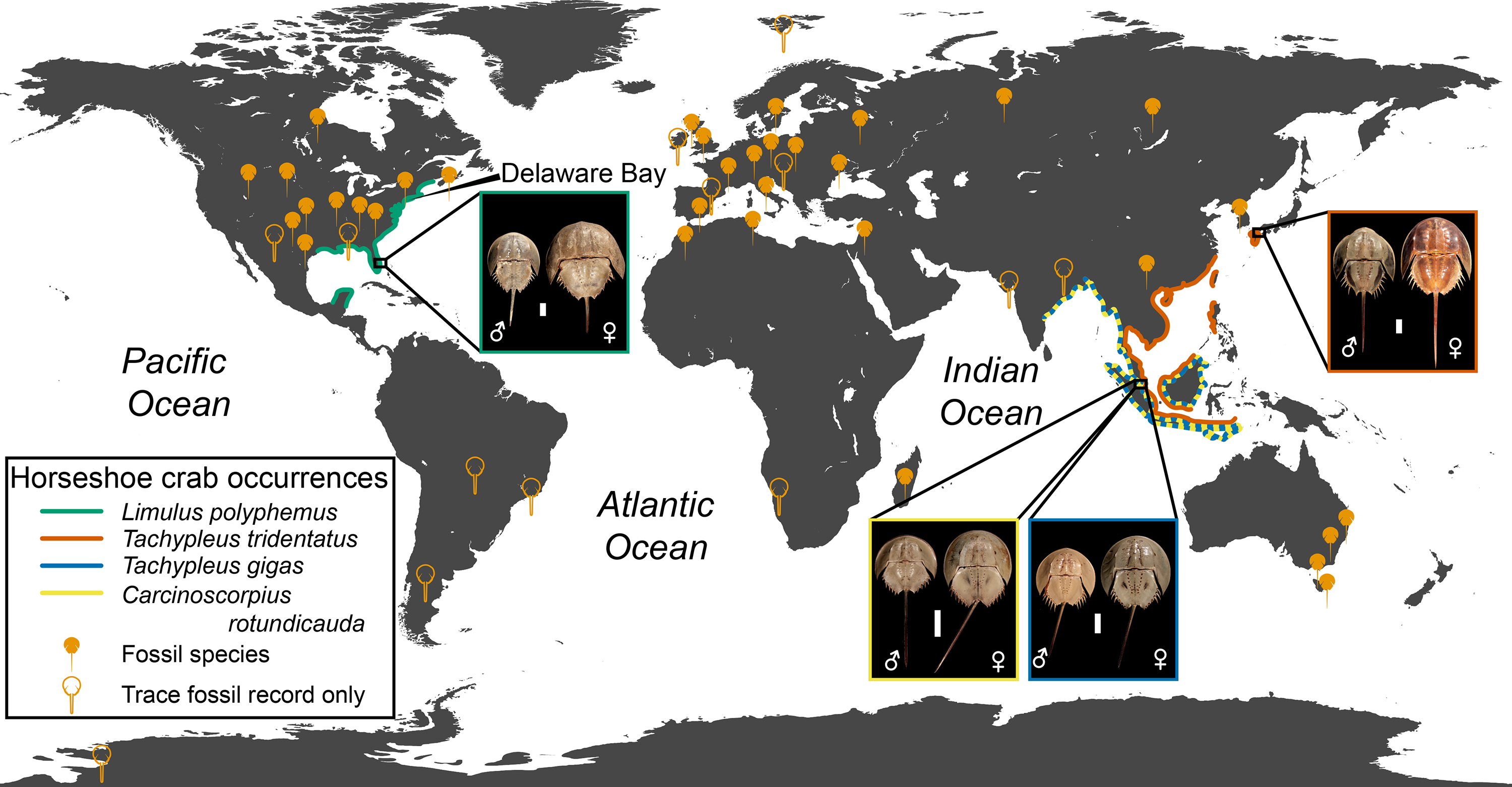
Known distribution of modern and fossil horseshoe crabs

In the modern day, horseshoe crabs have a relatively limited distribution. The three Asian species mainly occur in South and Southeast Asia along the Bay of Bengal and the coasts of Indonesia. A notable exception is the tri-spine horseshoe crab, whose range extends northward to the coasts of China, Taiwan, and Southern Japan. The American species lives from the coast of Nova Scotia to the northern Gulf of Mexico, with another population residing around the Yucatán Peninsula. Extant horseshoe crabs generally live in saltwater, though one species, the mangrove horseshoe crab (Carcinoscorpius) is often found in more brackish environments.

As recently as the Early Pleistocene, 2 million years ago, Limulus polyphemus inhabited the Kap Kobenhavn Formation of northern Greenland, as demonstrated by environmental DNA. Around this time, the sea surface temperature would have been 8 °C warmer than the present.

=== Past adaptation to freshwater ===
According to a phylogeny from 2015, now-extinct xiphosurans traveled to freshwater at least five times throughout history. This same transition happened twice in the horseshoe crabs Victalimulus and Limulitella, with both inhabiting environments such as swamps and rivers.

== Behavior and life history ==
=== Diet ===
Horseshoe crabs eat primarily worms and mollusks living on the ocean floor. They may also feed on crustaceans and even small fish. Foraging usually takes place at night.

=== Locomotion ===
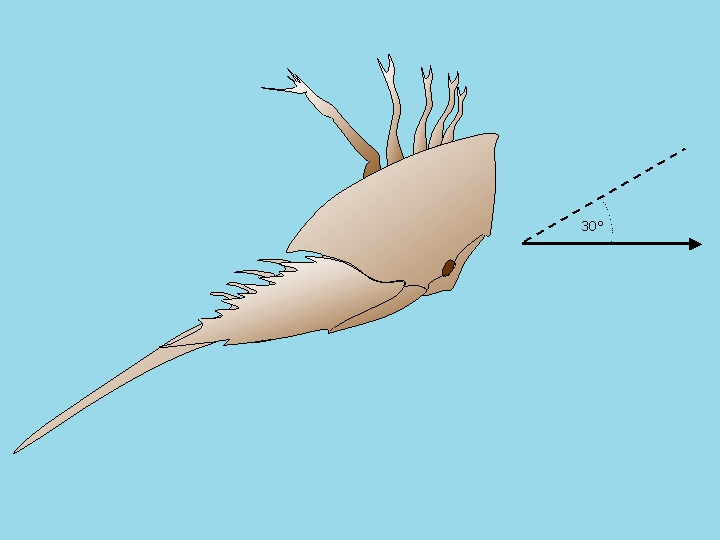
Horseshoe crab swimming position

Horseshoe crabs live a primarily benthic lifestyle, preferring to stay at the water's bottom. However, they are also known to swim. This behavior is widespread in young individuals or those traveling to the shore to breed. Horseshoe crabs swim upside-down with their bodies pointed downwards at an angle. They use their telson as a rudder, changing direction towards where it moved. To swim, the animal's retracted legs move to the front of its cephalothorax, extend, and stroke towards the back. This motion happens in unison with the genital operculum and the first three pairs of book gills. While the front appendages reset, the back two book gills perform a smaller stroke.

Horseshoe crabs have a variety of ways to right or flip themselves over. The most common method involves the animal arching its opisthosoma towards the carapace and balancing its telson on the substrate. The animal then moves the telson while beating its legs and gills. This causes the animal to tilt and eventually flip over. Furthermore, horseshoe crabs can right themselves while swimming. This method involves the animal swimming to the bottom, rolling on its side, and touching the bottom with its pusher legs while still in the water column.

=== Growth and development ===
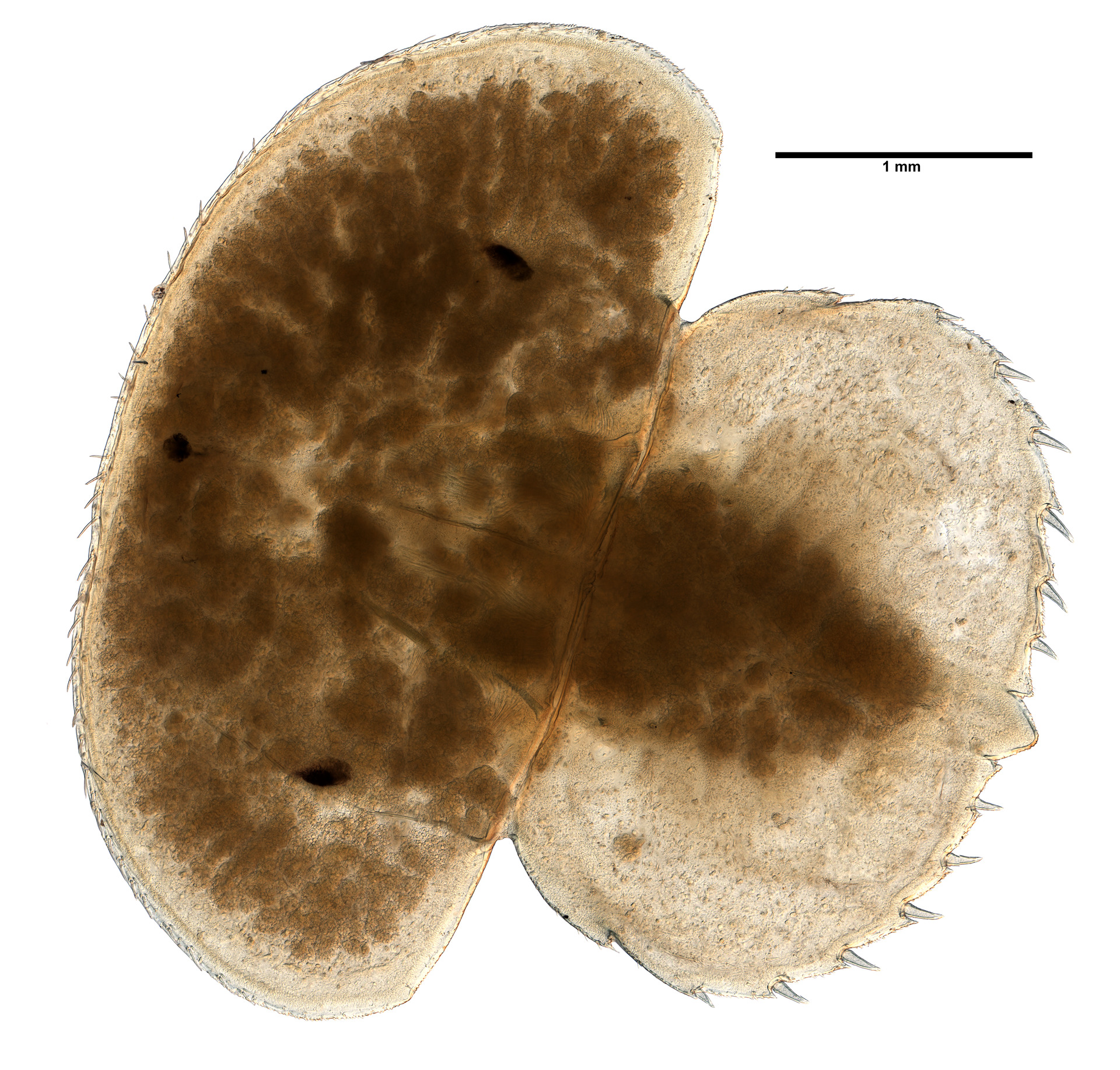
Horseshoe crab "trilobite" larva

Baby horseshoe crabs begin their lives as a "trilobite larvae", a name given due to their resemblance to the extinct trilobite. Upon hatching, larva typically measure around 1 cm (1/2 in) long. Their telson is small, and they lack three pairs of book gills. In all other respects, the larvae appear like minuscule adults. Baby horseshoe crabs can swim and burrow in sediment after emerging from their egg.

As the larvae molt into juveniles, their telson gets longer and they gain their missing book gills. Juveniles can attain a carapace width of around 4 cm (1 1/2 in) in their first year. For each molt, the juvenile will grow about 33% larger. This process continues until the animal reaches its adult size.

When mature, female horseshoe crabs are typically 20–30% larger than males. The smallest species is the mangrove horseshoe crab (C. rotundicauda) and the largest is the tri-spine horseshoe crab (T. tridentatus).

On average, males of C. rotundicauda are about 30 centimeters (12 inches) long, including a telson that is about 15 cm (6 in), and a carapace about 15 cm (6 in) wide. Some southern populations (in the Yucatán Peninsula) of L. polyphemus are somewhat smaller, but otherwise, this species is larger. In the largest species, T. tridentatus, females can reach as much as 79.5 cm (31 1/4 in) long, including their telson, and up to 4 kg (9 lb) in weight. This is only about 10–20 cm (4–8 in) longer than the largest females of L. polyphemus and T. gigas, but roughly twice the weight.

=== Reproduction ===
Horseshoe crabs mating

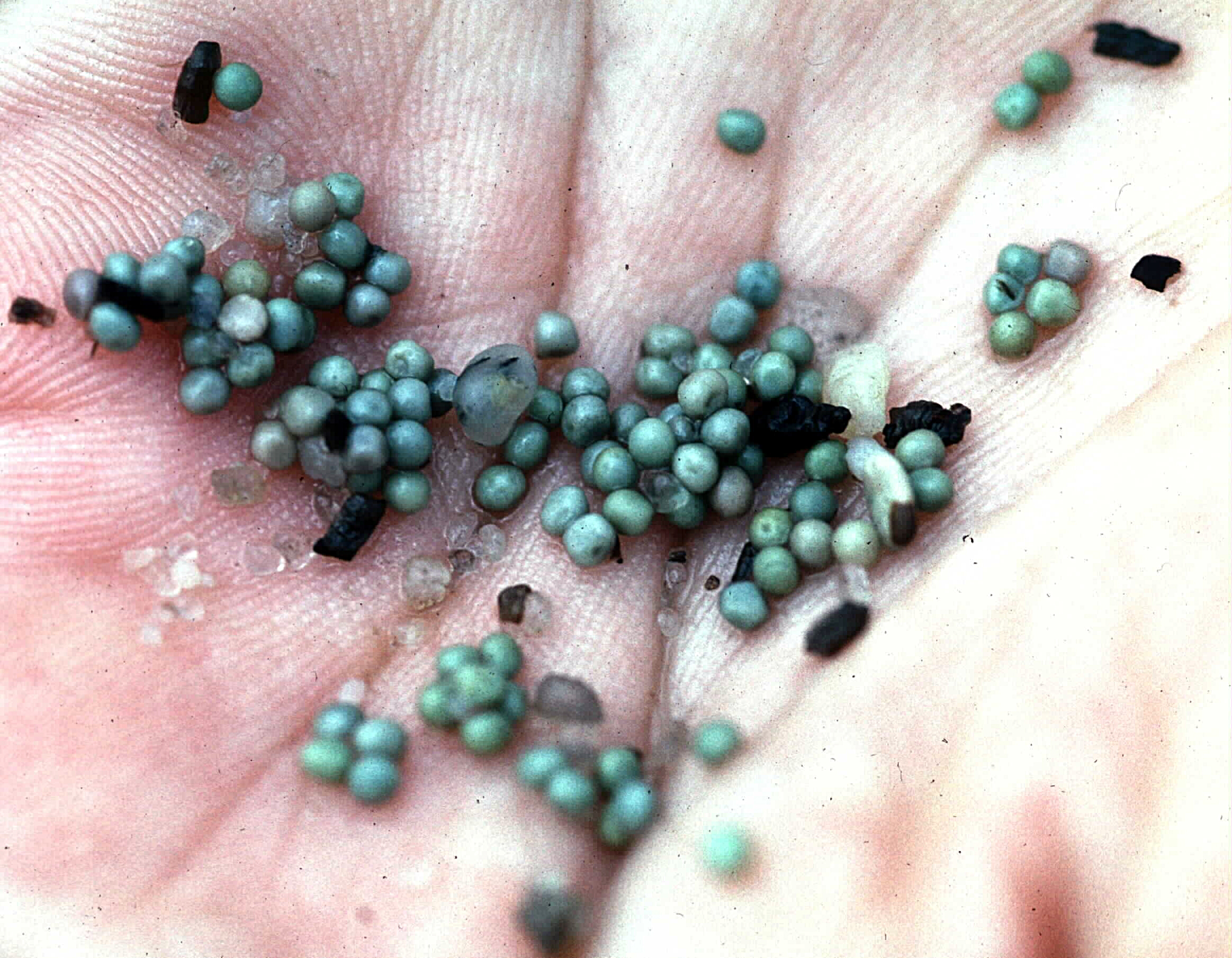
Horseshoe crab eggs

During the breeding season (spring and summer in the Northeast US, year-round in warmer locations) horseshoe crabs migrate to shallow coastal waters. Nesting typically happens at high tides around full or new moons. When nesting, they spawn on beaches and salt marshes. All four horseshoe crab species engage in amplexus, with the fully mature male utilizing its claspers to maintain prolonged grasp of the sexually dismorphically larger female.

When mating, the male clings to the back or opisthosoma of the female using specialized pedipalps. This typically leaves scars, the absence of which allows younger females to be easily identified. In the meantime, the female digs a hole in the sediment and lays between 2,000 and 30,000 large eggs. Unusual for arthropods, fertilization is done externally. In most species, procreation is done by both the main and additional "satellite males". Satellite males surround the main pair and may have some success fertilizing eggs. In L. polyphemus, the eggs take about two weeks to hatch with shore birds eating many of them in the process.

Natural breeding of horseshoe crabs in captivity has proven to be difficult. Some evidence indicates that mating takes place only in the presence of the sand or mud in which horseshoe crab eggs have previously hatched. However, it is not known with certainty what the animals sense in the sand, how they sense it, or why they mate only in its presence. In contrast, artificial insemination and induced spawning have been done since the 1980s. Additionally, eggs and juveniles collected from the wild can easily be raised to adulthood in a captive environment.

== Relationship with humans ==
=== Consumption ===
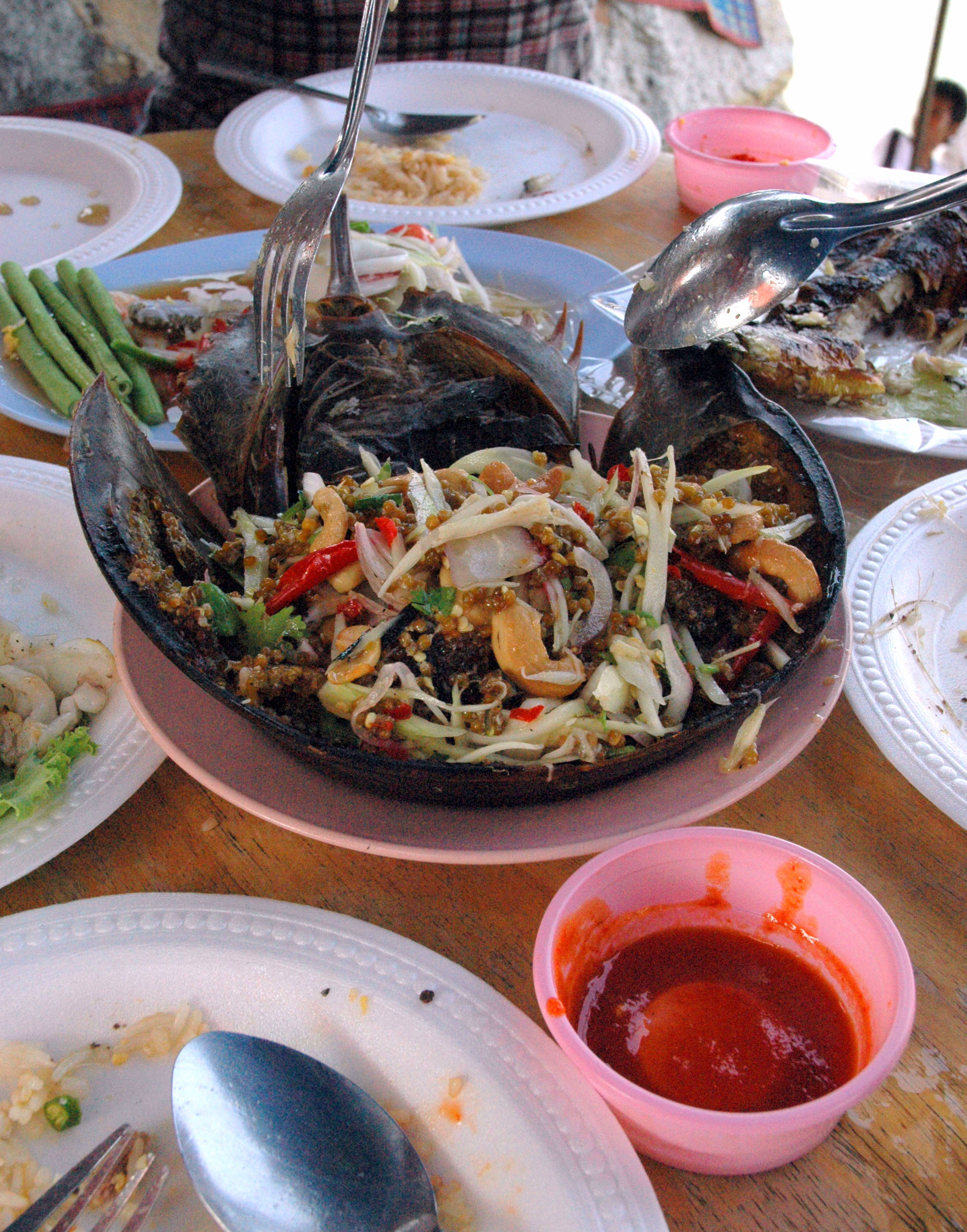
Horseshoe crab being served in Thailand (Si Racha, Chonburi Province, 2007)

Though they have little meat, horseshoe crabs are valued as a delicacy in some parts of East and Southeast Asia. The meat is white, has a rubbery texture similar to that of lobsters, and possesses a slightly salty aftertaste. Horseshoe crab can be eaten both raw and cooked, but must be properly prepared to prevent food poisoning. Furthermore, only certain species can be eaten. There have been numerous reports of poisonings after consuming mangrove horseshoe crabs (Carcinoscorpius rotundicauda) as its meat contains tetrodotoxin.

While horseshoe crab meat is commonly prepared by grilling or stewing, it can also be pickled in vinegar or stir-fried with vegetables. Many recipes involve the use of various spices, herbs, and chilies to give the dish more flavor.

In addition to their meat, horseshoe crabs are valued for their eggs. Much like the meat, only the eggs of specific species can be eaten. The eggs of mangrove horseshoe crabs contain tetrodotoxin and will result in food poisoning if consumed.

=== Use in fisheries ===
In the United States, horseshoe crabs are used as bait to fish for eels, whelk, or conch. Nearly 1 million crabs are harvested yearly for bait in the United States, dwarfing the biomedical mortality. However, fishing with horseshoe crab was banned indefinitely in New Jersey in 2008 with a moratorium on harvesting to protect the red knot, a shorebird that eats the crabs' eggs. A ban on catching female crabs was put in place in Delaware, and a permanent moratorium is in effect in South Carolina.

=== Use in medicine ===
The blood of a horseshoe crab contains cells known as amebocytes. These play a similar role to the white blood cells of vertebrates in defending the organism against pathogens. Amebocytes from the blood of Limulus polyphemus are used to make Limulus amebocyte lysate (LAL), which is used for the detection of bacterial endotoxins in medical applications. There is a high demand for blood, the harvest of which involves collecting the animals, bleeding them, and then releasing them back into the sea. Most of the animals survive the process; mortality is correlated with both the amount of blood extracted from an individual animal and the stress experienced during handling and transportation. Estimates of mortality rates following blood harvesting vary from 3–15% to 10–30%. Approximately 500,000 Limulus are harvested annually for this purpose. According to the biomedical industry, up to 30% of an individual's blood is removed. NPR disagrees with this claim, reporting that it "can deplete them of more than half their volume of blue blood". Bleeding may prevent female horseshoe crabs from being able to spawn or may decrease the number of eggs they can lay. It has been found that harvesting blood from horseshoe crabs drastically impacts their percent daily activity, decreasing their overall movement.

The horseshoe crabs spend between one and three days away from the ocean before being returned. As long as the gills stay moist, they can survive on land for four days. Some scientists are skeptical that certain companies return their horseshoe crabs to the ocean at all, instead suspecting them of selling the horseshoe crabs as fishing bait.

The use of horseshoe crab blood in pharmaceutical testing has begun to decline. In 1986, Kyushu University researchers discovered that the same test could be achieved by using isolated Limulus clotting factor C (rFC), an enzyme found in LAL, as by using LAL itself. Jeak Ling Ding, a National University of Singapore researcher, patented a process for manufacturing rFC; on 8 May 2003, synthetic isolated rFC made via her patented process became available for the first time. Industry at first took little interest in the new product, however, as it was patent-encumbered, not yet approved by regulators, and sold by a single manufacturer, Lonza Group. In 2013, however, Hyglos GmbH also began manufacturing its own rFC product. This, combined with the acceptance of rFC by European regulators, the comparable cost between LAL and rFC, and support from Eli Lilly and Company, which committed to using rFC in lieu of LAL, is projected to all but end the practice of blood harvesting from horseshoe crabs. Amgen and Abbott Laboratories announced in February 2026 that they were transitioning away from horseshoe crab blood for biomedical testing.

Vaccine research and development during the COVID-19 pandemic has added an additional "strain on the American horseshoe crab." In December 2019, a report of the US Senate which encouraged the Food and Drug Administration to "establish processes for evaluating alternative pyrogenicity tests and report back [to the Senate] on steps taken to increase their use" was released; PETA backed the report.

In June 2020, it was reported that U.S. Pharmacopeia had declined to give rFC equal standing with horseshoe crab blood. Without the approval for the classification as an industry standard testing material, U.S. companies will have to overcome the scrutiny of showing that rFC is safe and effective for their desired uses, which may serve as a deterrent for usage of the horseshoe crab blood substitute.

== Conservation status ==
Development along shorelines is dangerous to horseshoe crab spawning, limiting available space and degrading habitat. Bulkheads can block access to intertidal spawning regions as well.

The population of Indo-Pacific horseshoe crabs (Tachypleus gigas) in Malaysia and Indonesia has decreased dramatically since 2010. This is primarily due to overharvesting, as horseshoe crabs are considered a delicacy in countries like Thailand. The individuals most likely to be targeted are gravid females, as they can be sold for both their meat and eggs. This method of harvesting has led to an unbalanced sex ratio in the wild, something that also contributes to the area's declining population.

Because of habitat destruction for shoreline development, use in fishing, plastic pollution, status as a culinary delicacy, and use in research and medicine, the horseshoe crab faces both endangered and extinct statuses. One species, the tri-spine horseshoe crab (Tachypleus tridentatus), has already been declared locally extinct in Taiwan. Facing a greater than 90% decrease in T. tridentatus juveniles, it is suspected that Hong Kong will be the next to declare tri-spine horseshoe crabs as extinct from the area. This species is listed as endangered on the IUCN Red List, specifically because of the overexploitation and loss of critical habitat.

To preserve and ensure the continuous supply of horseshoe crabs, a breeding center was built in Johor, Malaysia, where animals are bred and released back into the ocean in the thousands once every two years. It is estimated to take around 12 years before they are suitable for consumption.

A low horseshoe crab population in Delaware Bay is hypothesized to endanger the future of the red knot. Red knots, long-distance migratory shorebirds, feed on the protein-rich eggs during their stopovers on the beaches of New Jersey and Delaware. An effort is ongoing to develop adaptive-management plans to regulate horseshoe crab harvests in the bay in a way that protects migrating shorebirds. In 2023, the US Fish and Wildlife Service halted the harvesting of horseshoe crabs in the Cape Romain National Wildlife Refuge, South Carolina, from March 15 to July 15 to aid their reproduction. This decision was influenced by the importance of horseshoe crab eggs as a food source for migratory birds, the ongoing use of horseshoe crabs for bait, and the use of their blood in medical products. The ban supports the conservation goals of the refuge, spanning 66,000 acres (26,700 hectares) of marshes, beaches, and islands near Charleston.
