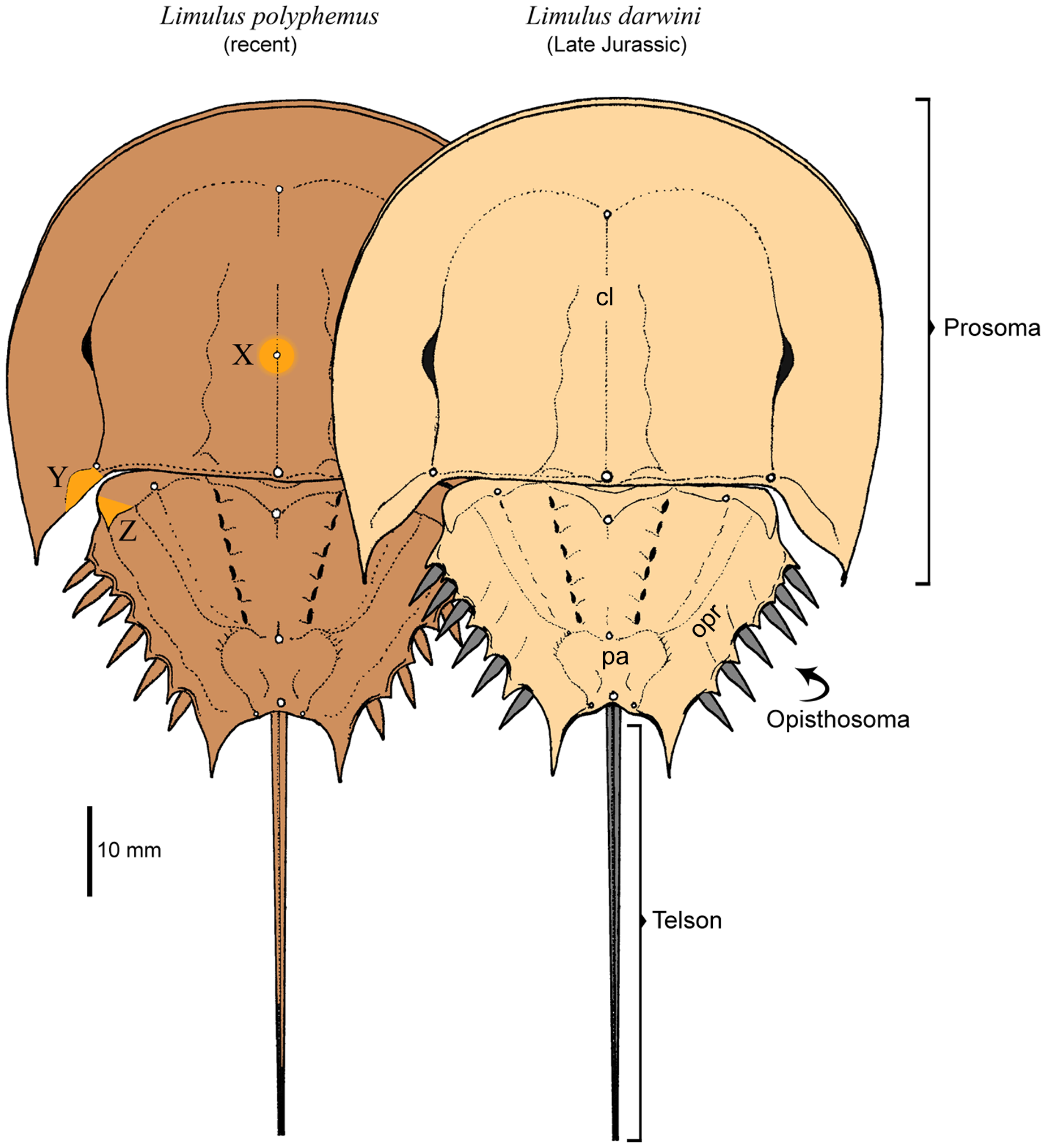
- Modern L. polyphemus compared to the very similar Jurassic Crenatolimulus darwini

Scientific classification
- Kingdom: Animalia
- Phylum: Arthropoda
- Subphylum: Chelicerata
- Class: Merostomata
- Order: Xiphosura
- Family: Limulidae
- Genus: Limulus; O. F. Müller, 1785

Type species
- Monoculus polyphemus Linnaeus, 1758

Synonyms
- Xiphosura

= Limulus =

Limulus Temporal range: Maastrichtian–Present

Genus of horseshoe crabs

Limulus is a genus of horseshoe crab, with one extant species, the Atlantic horseshoe crab (Limulus polyphemus). One fossil species is currently assigned to the genus though several other species have been named, which have since been assigned to other genera.

Currently valid species include:

- Limulus polyphemus (Linnaeus, 1758)
- Limulus coffini† Reeside & Harris, 1952- Pierre Shale, United States, Late Cretaceous (Maastrichtian)

Doubtful species include:

- Limulus nathorsti† Jackson, 1906- Jurassic, Sweden

Tentative species:

- "Limulus" decheni† Zinken, 1862- Paleogene, Germany (considered by some intermediate between Limulus and Tachypleus)
