= Limulus clotting enzyme =

Class of enzymes

Identifiers
- EC no.: 3.4.21.86

Databases
- BRENDA: enzyme data
- ExPASy: NiceZyme view
- KEGG: enzyme entry
- MetaCyc: metabolic pathway
- Rhea: reactions
- PDB structures: RCSB PDB PDBe PDBsum
Search
- PMC: articles
- PubMed: articles
- NCBI: proteins

Limulus clotting enzyme (EC 3.4.21.86, clotting enzyme) is a trypsin-like serine protease that catalyses the following chemical reaction:

Selective cleavage of Arg^{18}-Gly^{19} and Arg^{46}-Thr^{47} bonds in coagulogen to form coagulin and fragments

This enzyme is present in the hemocyte granules of horseshoe crabs Limulus and Tachypleus. In the immunity-related clotting pathways of these organisms, it is the final enzyme responsible for the activation of coagulin.

== Structure ==
The inactive form of Limulus clotting enzyme, referred to as proclotting enzyme, consists of a single chain glycoprotein. The enzyme is activated upon cleavage at the Arg^{98}-Ile^{99} bond by Limulus clotting factor B or Limulus clotting factor G. The active clotting enzyme consists of a light and heavy chain linked together by a disulfide bridge. The active site of the clotting enzyme is located in the heavy chain and contains the His-Asp-Ser catalytic triad that is common among serine proteases. The sequence of the heavy chain in the serine protease region is 34.1% homologous to that of human clotting factor X, and four disulfide linkages are found in the same locations in both enzymes (and in prothrombin). These similarities indicate a relationship between serine protease structure and function. Limulus clotting enzyme also has substrate specificity similar to mammalian factor X. The crystal structure of the enzyme is unknown.

The enzyme’s light chain contains a clip-like disulfide-knotted structure. Sequence homology in this region to the precursor of serine protease easter in Drosophila suggests that this structure may be common in invertebrate serine protease zymogens. Structural similarity of the light chain clip domain to horseshoe crab defensin suggests that the clip domain may have some antimicrobial activity.

The amino acid sequences of Limulus clotting enzyme and Limulus clotting factor B are 35.9% similar. This similarity suggests that the two enzymes originally arose due to gene duplication, and evolved over time to fill unique roles in the coagulation cascade.

Clotting enzymes isolated from Limulus polyphemus and Tachypleus tridentatus exhibit similar properties, indicating high conservation of this enzyme throughout evolutionary divergence.

== Function ==
=== Reaction ===
Limulus clotting enzyme uses 2H_{2}O to cleave the Arg^{18}-Gly^{19} and Arg^{46}-Thr^{47} linkages in coagulogen, forming coagulin + two peptide products. This process activates coagulin, allowing it to gel and form clots around bacterial invaders.

The reaction is hydrolytic and catalyzed by the His-Asp-Ser triad in the active site. The hydroxyl group in serine acts as a nucleophile, attacking the carbonyl carbon in the peptide bond. Histidine’s nitrogen atom accepts the hydrogen from serine’s hydroxyl group to make serine a stronger nucleophile. Aspartic acid forms hydrogen bonds with histidine to make this nitrogen atom more electronegative and therefore more likely to accept the hydrogen. The nucleophilic attack results in the peptide bond breaking, allowing one peptide fragment to be released. A water molecule is then deprotonated by the histidine. The resulting hydroxyl acts as a nucleophile to break the bond between the serine and the carbonyl, releasing the rest of the protein. The process is then repeated at the other peptide bond.

=== Role in coagulation ===
Limulus clotting enzyme is part of the coagulation cascade in horseshoe crab hemocytes. The cascade is triggered by the presence of bacterial endotoxins, which are detected by Limulus clotting factor C. Factor C activates factor B, which activates the clotting enzyme. The clotting enzyme then activates coagulin. The coagulation cascade can also be triggered by (1,3)-β-D-glucan, a constituent of many fungal cell walls. The (1,3)-β-D-glucan-mediated cascade follows a different pathway than the endotoxin-mediated cascade. When (1,3)-β-D-glucan is present, Limulus factor G is activated. Factor G then activates the clotting enzyme, which proceeds to activate coagulin.

Limulus clotting enzyme is inhibited by serpins LICI-2 and LICI-3. These serpins regulate the coagulation cascade by preventing diffusion of active clotting factors, which could lead to unnecessary clot formation.

The horseshoe crab coagulation cascade is an important defense mechanism against bacterial and fungal invaders. Clots contain and immobilize infectious cells, which can then be killed with antimicrobial substances produced by the hemocytes. This specialized system is useful because invertebrates lack adaptive immunity.

=== Medical use ===
Hemocyte extracts from horseshoe crabs are commonly used in drug and medical device testing for these coagulative properties. Clotting indicates that endotoxins are present in the product.
