= Coagulin =

Identifiers
- Symbol: Coagulin
- Pfam: PF02035
- InterPro: IPR000275
- SCOP2: d1aoca_ / SCOPe / SUPFAM
Available protein structures:
- PDB: IPR000275 PF02035 (ECOD; PDBsum)
- AlphaFold: IPR000275; PF02035

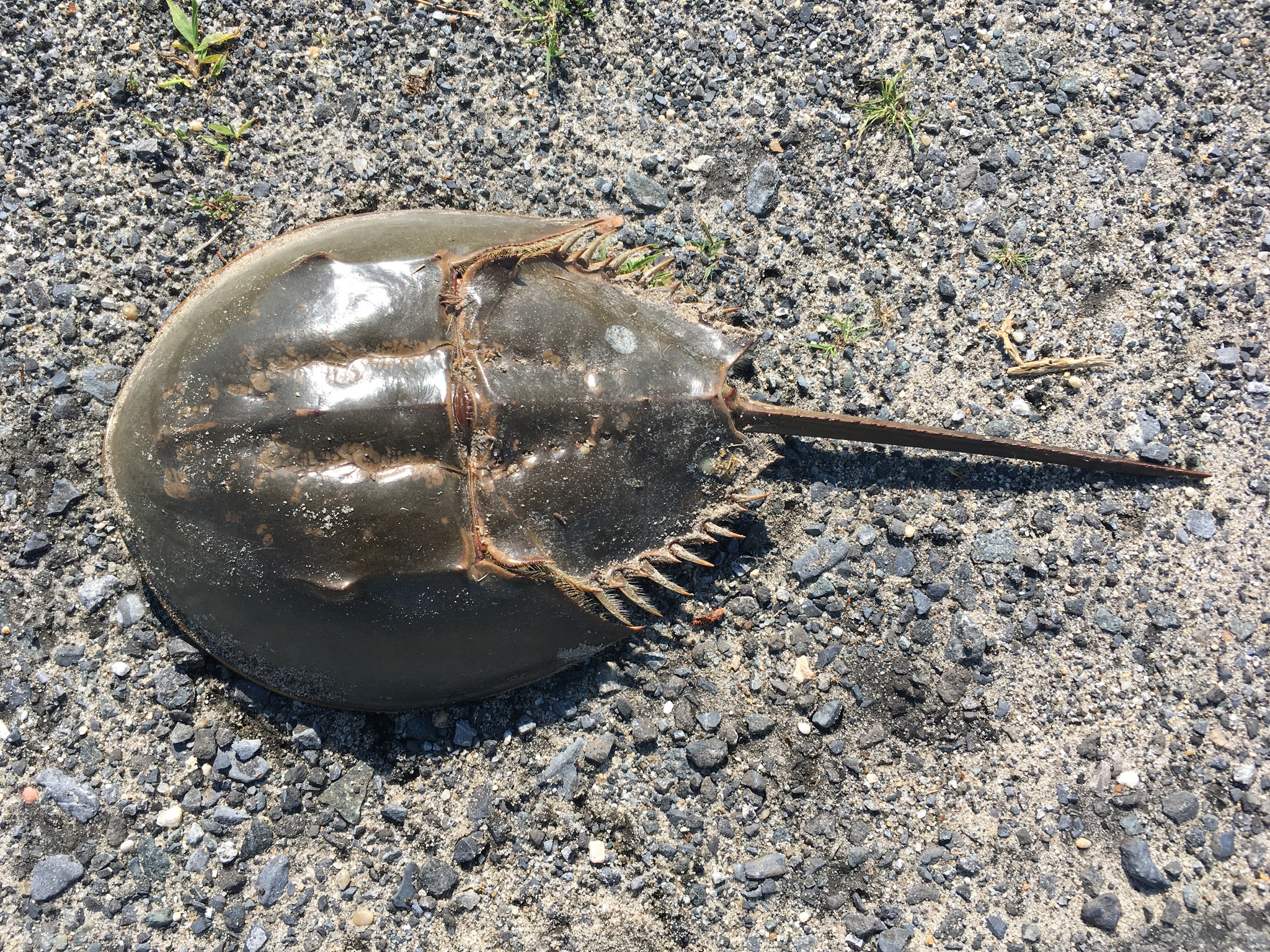
Limulus polyphemus horseshoe crabs use coagulin to form gel clots

Coagulin is a gel-forming protein of hemolymph that hinders the spread of bacterial and fungal invaders by immobilizing them. It is produced in the coagulogen form before being cleaved into the active form through a serine proteinase cascade. It has been most extensively studied in horseshoe crabs. It has also been produced by other organisms, such as Bacillus coagulans I_{4} in a plasmid location. In human medicine, coagulation of coagulin is the basis of detection of bacterial endotoxin through the Limulus amebocyte lysate test for parenteral medications.

== Structure ==
Coagulogen contains a single 175-residue polypeptide chain that is cleaved after Arg-18 and Arg-46 by a Limulus clotting enzyme contained in the granular hemocyte cells of the hemolymph. A pathway is initiated in which ultimately the limulus clotting enzyme cleaves coagulogen to coagulin. Cleavage releases two chains of coagulin, chains A and B, covalently linked by two disulfide bonds, together with the peptide C. The A-B fold wraps around the helical peptide C, forming a compact structure. The approximate mass of coagulin is 3-4 kDA by SDS-PAGE. Gel formation results from interlinking of coagulin molecules. Before interlinking the coagulin monomers, peptide C is cleaved from coagulogen. Removal of peptide C exposes an extended hydrophobic cove of the newly cleaved molecule, allowing interaction with a second molecule’s hydrophobic edge. The full-length structure of a coagulogen is known (PDB: 1AOC); it shares the same cystine-knot cytokine superfamily (fold) as neurotrophins, with several cystines conserved.

== Coagulation ==
Hemolymph coagulation is a part of the invertebrate immune response. Factors within the hemolymph are activated and initiate a pathway where insoluble clots are formed in order to prevent leakage of bodily fluids and immobilized microbes from infecting the organism. This is crucial as invertebrate organisms do not have adaptive immune systems comparable to the one in the mammalian immune system. In crustaceans, hemolymph coagulation depends on the transglutaminase-mediated cross-linking of specific plasma-clotting proteins, but without the proteolytic cascade.

In horseshoe crabs, the proteolytic coagulation cascade is triggered by lipopolysaccharides and beta-1,3-glucans. There are two types of hemocytes within the horseshoe crab hemolymph: granular and nongranular. The granular hemocytes are activated by bacterial endotoxins lipopolysaccharides (LPS) that are found on the surface of Gram-negative bacteria. “...LPS comprises approximately 70% of the outer membranes of gram-negative bacteria.” They are also activated by beta-1,3-glucans that are found on the cell walls of yeast and some fungi.

In the LPS-activated pathway, LPS activates zymogen factor C. It is autocatalytically converted into the activated form factor C. The active factor C converts inactive factor B into active factor B. Active factor B converts the proclotting enzyme into the clotting enzyme. The clotting enzyme cleaves coagulogen into coagulin, resulting in noncovalent coagulin homopolymers through head-to-tail interaction.

In the beta-1,3-glucan activated pathway, there are slight differences. Beta-1,3-glucan activates zymogen factor G. It is autocatalytically converted into the activated form factor G. From here, the pathway converges into the LPS-activated pathway. The active factor G converts the proclotting enzyme into the clotting enzyme to cleave coagulogen into coagulin. In both pathways, gel formation occurs when the final enzyme transglutaminase cross-links coagulin.

However, horseshoe crab transglutaminase does not cross-link coagulins intermolecularly. Recently, coagulins were discovered to be cross-linked on hemocyte cell surface proteins called proxins. This indicates that a cross-linking reaction at the final stage of hemolymph coagulation is an important innate immune system of horseshoe crabs.

In comparison, mammalian blood coagulation differs from hemolymph coagulation. Mammalian blood coagulation is largely dependent on platelets and fibrin, whereas hemolymph does not contain platelets or fibrin but hemocytes. Mammalian blood coagulation is based on the proteolytically induced polymerization of fibrinogens. There are two pathways (Tissue factor and Contact) that result in thrombin converting fibrinogen to fibrin. Fibrin monomers noncovalently interact with each other and polymerize to form the blood clot. Fibrin and coagulin are analogous to each other. Similarities between mammalian blood coagulation and hemolymph coagulation include gel formation, TGase, and serve as a part of wound healing. However, the clot formed in hemolymph coagulation is softer than the mammalian fibrin clot.

== Uses ==
=== Limulus amebocyte lysate test ===
Limulus amebocyte lysate is manufactured from horseshoe crabs, specifically the Limulus polyphemus species. In the presence of bacterial endotoxins (LPS) and beta-1,3-glucans, it initiates the coagulation pathways . It is employed as an FDA-approved assay method to test sterility of medical instruments and injectable drugs, such as in the pharmaceutical industry.

Since the 1970s, the Limulus amebocyte lysate test has been used to test for endotoxins in human blood samples. The original method (Limulus gelation test) involved qualitatively looking for coagulin gel formation. After a one hour incubation, if the sample was coagulated, it formed a solid clot that was positive for endotoxins. If the sample was not coagulated, it would be liquid and was negative for endotoxins. However, the technique was limited by its sensitivity.

Today, the Limulus test is one hundred times more sensitive and uses a chromogenic method of detection. When coagulogen is cleaved by the clotting enzyme, coagulin is produced. However the clotting enzyme also produces a chromogenic end product known as pNA. pNA (Boc-Leu-Gly-Arg-p-nitroanilide) is the chromogenic product that emits a yellow color. The concentration of endotoxins in a sample can be calculated by measuring the absorbance of released pNA at 405 nm.

== Evolution ==
Coagulin is found in the four species of horseshoe crabs: Limulus polyphemus, Tachypleus tridentatus, Tachypleus gigas, and Carcinoscorpius rotundicauda. They are deemed living fossils as they have been around for 445-500 million years with little significant change compared to their ancestors. The coagulin precursor, coagulogen, has a mutation rate of 1.2 × 10^{−9} per amino acid per year as compared to its mammalian analog, fibrinogen, with a mutation rate of 8.3 × 10^{−9}. It is contained in hemocytes, a type of phagocyte. There are different types of phagocytes and are found in all invertebrate groups (as either hemocytes, amoebocytes, or coelomocytes). Comparing vertebrae and Limulus polyphemus coagulation systems, none of the cascade proteins (including coagulogen) share a common protein domain with two exceptions, Hemolectin and TGase. While the two systems are functionally similar, the coagulation proteins “have different evolutionary histories.”

== See also ==
- Limulus clotting enzyme
- Limulus clotting factor B
- Limulus clotting factor C
- Lipopolysaccharide
- Beta-glucan
- Limulus amebocyte lysate
