= Kdo =

Kdo or KDO may refer to:

- 3-deoxy-D-manno-octulosonic acid kinase, an enzyme
- Ketodeoxyoctonic acid
- Kommandeur der Ordnungspolizei (KdO), commander of the German Ordnungspolizei during World War II
- Kuwaiti Division One, football league in Kuwait
