= 3-deoxy-manno-octulosonate cytidylyltransferase =

InterPro Family

Identifiers
- EC no.: 2.7.7.38
- CAS no.: 37278-28-7

Databases
- IntEnz: IntEnz view
- BRENDA: BRENDA entry
- ExPASy: NiceZyme view
- KEGG: KEGG entry
- MetaCyc: metabolic pathway
- PRIAM: profile
- PDB structures: RCSB PDB PDBe PDBsum
- Gene Ontology: AmiGO / QuickGO
Search
- PMC: articles
- PubMed: articles
- NCBI: proteins

3-deoxy-manno-octulosonate cytidylyltransferase (EC 2.7.7.38) is an enzyme that catalyzes the chemical reaction

3-deoxy-D-manno-oct-2-ulosonic acid
+
cytidine triphosphate
PP_{i}
CMP-3-deoxy-β-D-manno-octulosonic acid

The enzyme characterised from Escherichia coli combines 3-deoxy-D-manno-oct-2-ulosonic acid and cytidine triphosphate to give CMP-3-deoxy-β-D-manno-octulosonic acid, with pyrophosphate (PP_{i}) as a byproduct. The reaction is part of the biosynthesis of lipopolysaccharide.

This enzyme is a transferases, specifically one transferring phosphorus-containing nucleotide groups (nucleotidyltransferases). The systematic name of this enzyme class is CTP:3-deoxy-D-manno-octulosonate cytidylyltransferase. Other names in common use include CMP-3-deoxy-D-manno-octulosonate pyrophosphorylase, 2-keto-3-deoxyoctonate cytidylyltransferase, 3-Deoxy-D-manno-octulosonate cytidylyltransferase, CMP-3-deoxy-D-manno-octulosonate synthetase, CMP-KDO synthetase, CTP:CMP-3-deoxy-D-manno-octulosonate cytidylyltransferase, and cytidine monophospho-3-deoxy-D-manno-octulosonate pyrophosphorylase.

== Structural studies ==
As of late 2007, 11 structures have been solved for this class of enzymes, with PDB accession codes PDB: 1GQ9, PDB: 1GQC, PDB: 1H6J, PDB: 1H7E, PDB: 1H7F, PDB: 1H7G, PDB: 1H7H, PDB: 1H7T, PDB: 1VH1, PDB: 1VH3, and PDB: 1VIC.
