= Limulus amebocyte lysate =

Chemical used for the detection and quantification of bacterial endotoxins

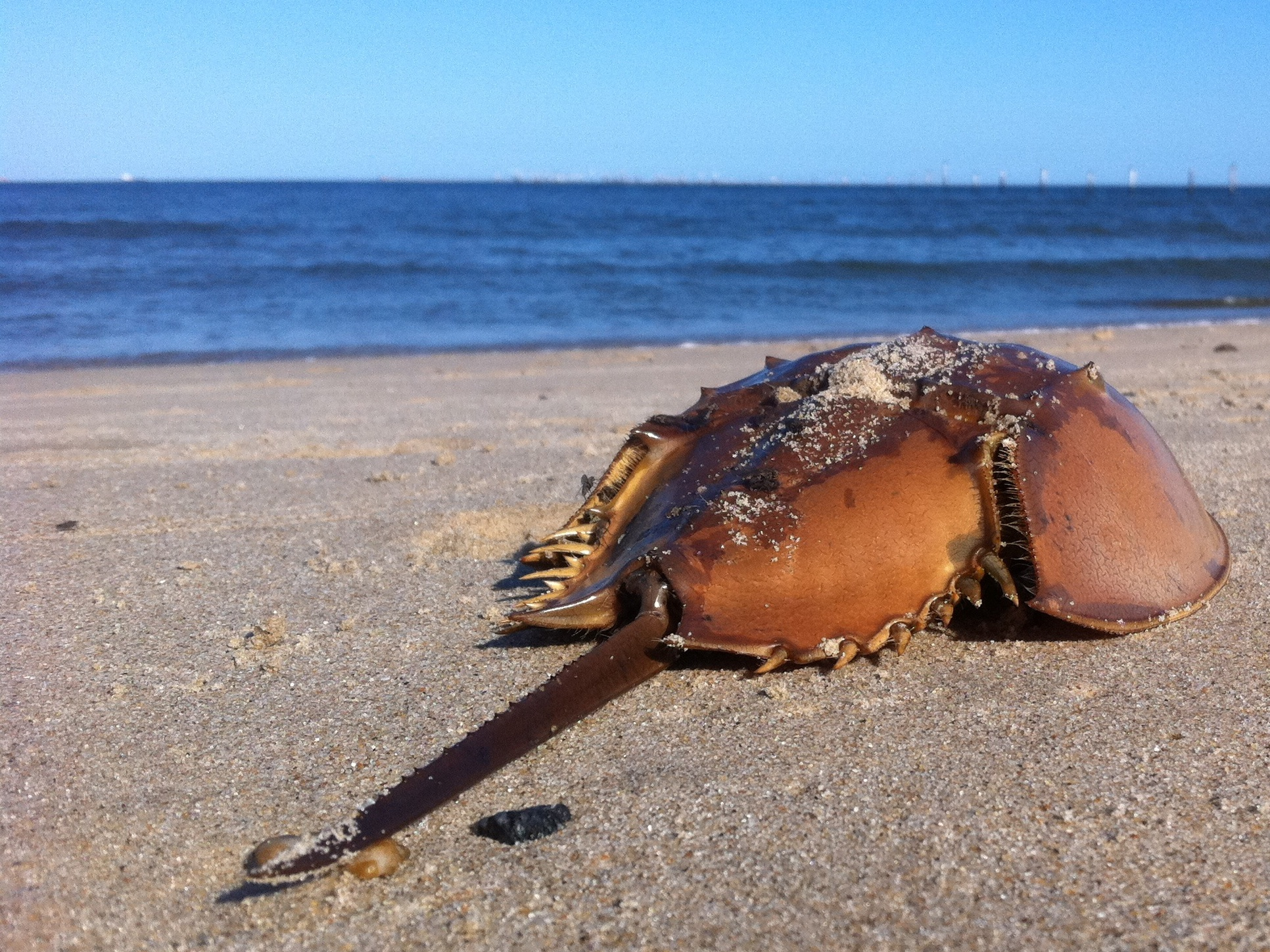
Atlantic horseshoe crab Limulus polyphemus

Limulus amebocyte lysate (LAL) is an aqueous extract of motile blood cells (amebocytes) from the Atlantic horseshoe crab Limulus polyphemus. LAL reacts with bacterial endotoxins such as lipopolysaccharides (LPS), which are components of the bacterial capsule, the outermost membrane of cell envelope of gram-negative bacteria. This reaction is the basis of the LAL test, which is widely used for the detection and quantification of bacterial endotoxins.

In Asia, a similar Tachypleus amebocyte lysate (TAL) test based on the local horseshoe crabs Tachypleus gigas or Tachypleus tridentatus is occasionally used instead. The recombinant factor C (rFC) assay is a replacement of LAL and TAL based on a similar reaction.

== Background ==
The American medical researcher Fred Bang reported in 1956 that gram-negative bacteria, even if killed, will cause the blood of the horseshoe crab to turn into a gel, a type of semi-solid mass. It was later recognized that the animal's blood cells, mobile cells called amebocytes, contain granules with a clotting factor known as coagulogen; this is released outside the cell when bacterial endotoxins are encountered. After coagulation and subsequent gelling, the resulting gel is thought to provide containment of bacterial infections in the animal's semi-closed circulatory system. Modern analysis of the lysate has led to understanding of this system of cascade, with multiple enzymes working in sequence to produce the gel. The entry point of endotoxin-induced clotting is Limulus clotting factor C.

In 1977 the U.S. Food and Drug Administration (FDA) approved LAL for testing drugs, products and devices that come in contact with blood. Prior to that date, a much slower and more expensive test on rabbits had been used for this purpose.

Horseshoe crabs are collected and blood is removed from the horseshoe crab's pericardium; some crabs are then returned to the water, while others are sold to be eaten or used as bait. Companies extracting LAL from horseshoe crabs stated before 2008 that mortality rates were below 3%. A 2009 Massachusetts Division of Marine Fisheries study stated that earlier studies found 5 to 15% mortality for males and one estimate of 29% for females. The study itself found 22% for females returned immediately to the water, and 30% for females kept overnight to represent commercial practice. The blood cells are separated from the serum using centrifugation and are then placed in distilled water, which causes them to swell and burst ("lyse"). This releases the chemicals from the inside of the cell (the "lysate"), which is then purified and freeze-dried. To test a sample for endotoxins, it is mixed with lysate and water; endotoxins are present if coagulation occurs.

== The LAL test ==
There are three basic methodologies: gel-clot, turbidimetric, and chromogenic. The primary application for LAL is the testing of parenteral pharmaceuticals and medical devices that contact blood or cerebrospinal fluid. In the United States, the FDA has published a guideline for validation of the LAL test as an endotoxin test for such products.

The LAL cascade is also triggered by (1,3)-β-D-glucan, via a different Factor G. Both bacterial endotoxins and (1,3)-β-D-glucan are considered pathogen-associated molecular patterns, or PAMPs, substances which elicit inflammatory responses in mammals.

=== Overcoming inhibition and enhancement ===
One of the most time-consuming aspects of endotoxin testing using LAL is pretreating samples to overcome assay inhibition that may interfere with the LAL test such that the recovery of endotoxin is affected. If the product being tested causes the endotoxin recovery to be less than expected, the product is inhibitory to the LAL test. Products which cause higher than expected values are enhancing. Overcoming the inhibition and enhancement properties of a product is required by the FDA as part of the validation of the LAL test for use in the final release testing of injectables and medical devices. Proper endotoxin recovery must be proven before LAL can be used to release product.

== Alternatives ==
=== Recombinant factor C assay ===
The LAL test is a major source of animal product dependence in the biomedical industry, and a challenge to the Three Rs of science in relation to the use of animals in testing. With reports of higher-than anticipated mortality rates it has been considered more ethical to devise alternatives to the test. Since 2003, a recombinant protein substitute for use in the LAL test has been commercially available. Named the recombinant factor C (rFC) assay, it is based on the same Limulus clotting factor C protein, but produced by genetically modified insect cells (the specific factor C sequence used does not necessarily come from the Atlantic horseshoe crab).

Instead of emulating the whole clotting pathway, rFC tests let factor C cleave a synthetic fluorogenic substrate, so that the sample lights up when endotoxin activates the factor. Since it does not contain factor G, (1,3)-β-D-glucan will not cause false-positives. As of 2018, available evidence shows that the rFC test is no worse than the LAL test.

The adoption of the rFC test was slow, which began to change in 2012 when the US FDA and the European health ministry acknowledged it as an accepted alternative. Its lack of mention in Pharmacopeias remained an issue, as there was no good standard for running the test in production. In 2016, it was added to the European Pharmacopoeia. A patent on rFC also limited adoption until its expiration in 2018.

On 1 June 2020, the United States Pharmacopeia (USP) decided to cancel the proposal to include recombinant technology for endotoxin testing in chapter 85, Bacterial Endotoxins, and start the development of a separate chapter that expands on the use, validation, and comparability of endotoxin tests based on recombinantly derived reagents. A separate guidance-only chapter 1085.1 was proposed by the USP, though comments and feedback published on 11 December 2020 show that pharmaceutical companies and the FDA did not support this chapter and requested compendial status.

In response, USP subsequently developed General Chapter <86>, Bacterial Endotoxins Test Using Recombinant Reagents, which provides compendial requirements for endotoxin testing using non-animal-derived reagents such as recombinant factor C (rFC). Chapter <86> became official in USP–NF in May 2025, establishing rFC as a pharmacopeially recognized alternative to the Limulus amebocyte lysate test.

=== Monocyte activation test ===
The monocyte activation test (MAT) is another proposed method to test for endotoxins based on monocytes in human blood. It measures the release of cytokines from these due to the presence of pyrogens, basically mirroring the process by which these toxins cause fever in humans (and rabbits, as in the original pyrogen test). A protocol for the MAT test, using cultured cells, is described in the European Pharmacopoeia.

A recent study employing genetically engineered monocytes was able to significantly enhance the sensitivity of monocyte-based detection assays by bringing down the assay-completion time from more than 20 hours to 2–3 hours.

== See also ==
- Limulus clotting enzyme
- Lipopolysaccharide
