= Depyrogenation =

Removal of pyrogens from solutions

Depyrogenation refers to the removal of pyrogens from solutions, most commonly from injectable pharmaceuticals.

A pyrogen is defined as any substance that can cause a fever. Bacterial pyrogens include endotoxins and exotoxins, although many pyrogens are endogenous to the host. Endotoxins include lipopolysaccharide (LPS) molecules found as part of the cell wall of Gram-negative bacteria, and are released upon bacterial cell lysis. Endotoxins may become pyrogenic when released into the bloodstream or other tissue where they are not usually found. Although the colon contains Gram-negative bacteria in abundance, they do not cause a pyrogenic effect as the bacteria are not undergoing gross lysis, and the immune system is not exposed to free endotoxin while the colonic wall is intact.

When LPS is released upon bacterial cell lysis, the lipid A component is first bound by serum LPS-Binding Protein (LBP) and then transferred to CD14 (either free CD14 in the serum or bound to the cell surface of macrophages or monocytes). This monomerises the aggregated LPS, as the LPS receptor Toll-like Receptor 4 (TLR4) cannot recognise LPS while aggregated. Monomeric LPS is then transferred to MD-2 pre-complexed with TLR4 on macrophages and monocytes. This leads to release of pro-inflammatory cytokines and nitric oxide, which may lead ultimately to septic shock depending on the strength of response. Vascular endothelial cells also express TLR4 and MD-2 and so respond to LPS directly, as well as via cytokines and nitric oxide. Bronchial epithelial cells and colonic epithelial cells also express TLR4, but as they do not express MD-2 they rely on LPS precomplexed with serum MD-2 in order to signal to LPS.

== Maximum acceptable endotoxin level ==
Because endotoxin molecular weight may vary a great deal (10,000 to 1,000,000 Da), endotoxin levels are measured in "endotoxin units" (EU). One EU is approximately equivalent to 100 pg of E. coli lipopolysaccharide—the amount present in around 10^{5} bacteria. Humans can develop symptoms when exposed to as little as 5 EU/kg body weight. These symptoms include, but are not limited to, fever, low blood pressure, increased heart rate, and low urine output; and even small doses of endotoxin in the blood stream are often fatal.

The United States Food and Drug Administration has set the following maximum permissible endotoxin levels for drugs distributed in the United States:

- Drug (injectable, intrathecal) - 0.2 EU/kg body weight
- Drug (injectable, non-intrathecal) - 5 EU/kg body weight
- Sterile water - 0.25-0.5 EU/ml (depends on intended use)

== Pyrogen detection ==
=== Rabbit Test ===
Early endotoxin detection was accomplished by injecting rabbits with the sample and observing the response in their body temperature. Rabbits have similar endotoxin tolerance to humans, and were thus an ideal choice. However, this method was costly, time consuming, and prompted protests from animals rights advocates. But perhaps the biggest drawback of this test was its inability to quantify the endotoxin level.

=== LAL test ===
Currently, one common method for endotoxin detection is the Limulus amebocyte lysate (LAL) test. This test is based on Dr. Frederik Bang's observation that horseshoe crab blood forms clots when exposed to endotoxins. Amoebocyte extract from horseshoe crab blood is mixed with a sample suspected of endotoxin contamination, and a reaction is observed if endotoxins are present. The FDA has approved four variations of the LAL test: gel-clot, turbidimetric, colorimetric, and chromogenic assay. The differences in these variations refer to the characteristics of the amoebocyte/endtoxin reaction (e.g. gel-clot produces a precipitate and colorimetric changes color). This test is fast (approx. 30 minutes) and highly sensitive (up to 0.001 EU/ml sensitivity). However, because it only detects LPS endotoxins, some pyrogenic materials can be missed. Also, certain conditions (sub-optimal pH conditions or unsuitable cation concentration) can lead to false negatives. Glucans from carbohydrate chromatography matrices can also lead to false positives.

Since 2003, a synthetic substitute for the LAL test has been commercially available. This recombinant factor C (rFC) test is based on Limulus clotting factor C, the LPS-sensitive part of LAL. The adoption of this test was slow, which began to change in 2016 when the European Pharmacopoeia listed this test as an accepted bacterial-toxin test.

=== Monocyte activation test ===
The monocyte activation test (MAT) uses the monocytes in human blood in vitro to detect pyrogens. It was added to the European Pharmacopoeia in 2010 and accepted by the FDA in 2012.

== Pyrogen removal (depyrogenation) ==
Pyrogens can often be difficult to remove from solution due to the high variability of their molecular weight. Pyrogens are also relatively thermally stable and insensitive to pH changes. However, several removal techniques exist.

=== Ion exchange chromatography ===
Endotoxins are negatively charged, and will bind to an anion exchanger. If the target substance is not also negatively charged, it will pass through the column before the endotoxin, and an effective separation can be achieved. This method is sometimes used in the purification of albumins (details follow). Ligands of known affinity to endotoxins can be coupled to an anion exchange system to increase its endotoxin binding strength and further improve the purity of the final product. Typical examples of endotoxin binding ligands include histamine, nitrogen-containing heterocyclic compounds, and polymyxin B. However, polymyxin B is known to induce production of interleukin-1, an exogenous pyrogen, and thus must be shown to be absent in the final product if used.
Example of using anion exchange chromatography to purify albumin:
- 2% of the endotoxin does not bind to the column. However, this 2% washes out before the albumin peak, and can thus be removed simply by starting collection after this 2% has washed out.
- 10% of the endotoxin that does bind to the column (9.8% of the original total) will eventually wash out after the albumin peak. This can be prevented from entering the final product by stopping collection before this happens.
- The remaining 90% of the bound endotoxin (88.2% of the original total) must be cleaned off the column using NaOH
An alternative to anion exchange is cation exchange chromatography, in which positively charged solutes bind to the solid chromatographic media. In this method, the target binds to the column instead of the endotoxin. The endotoxin then washes through the column, and a pure target is later eluted off the column. Cation exchange chromatography has been shown to effectively purify β-interferon. (Dembinski, et al.)

=== Ultrafiltration ===
Because the molecular weight of endotoxins is usually over 10 kD, ultrafiltration can sometimes be used to perform as a size based separation. Due to the high variability of endotoxin size, it can be difficult to select the correct membrane, hence this method is best used only when all endotoxins present are larger than 300,000 Da. Commercially available ultra filters have been shown to remove pyrogens to a level below 0.001 EU/ml.

=== Distillation ===
This method is also based on the large molecular weight and heat stability of endotoxins. Low molecular-weight solvents can be easily purified by boiling and collecting the condensed vapor in an endotoxin free vessel (see "heating" below). The large LPS molecules do not easily vaporize, and are thus left behind in the heating vessel. This is the method of choice for the purification of water.

== Inactivation/destruction ==
Because pyrogens are often difficult to remove, inactivation or destruction of the LPS molecule can sometimes be preferable.

=== Acid-base hydrolysis ===
This method has been shown to cleave Lipid A from the polysaccharide in the LPS molecule (see right). The lipid moiety alone is not soluble in water. Thus unable to bind to endothelial cells, it is rendered inactive. However, acid-base hydrolysis can denature a target protein, and is thus unsuitable when purifying a protein.

=== Oxidation ===
Oxidation using hydrogen peroxide is often used as a low cost pyrogen destroying solution. The mechanism for this destruction is unknown, but hydrogen peroxide can easily be removed further downstream in the purification process, and is therefore a useful method of pyrogen removal. However, like acid-base hydrolysis, it is not suitable when purifying proteins.

=== Heating ===
Heating methods are often used to ensure that glass and other lab equipment are free of pyrogenic material. Heat is applied by baking in a dry heat oven that is designed specifically for the depyrogenation process. Although endotoxins are relatively thermally stable, sufficient heating (250 °C for 30 min) results in a 3-log reduction of endotoxin levels. Due to the high temperature levels, this method is also not suitable when purifying proteins.

=== Alkalies ===
When purifying proteins, alkalies such as sodium hydroxide (NaOH) can be used safely and effectively. It is also widely used for depyrogenation of non-autoclavable equipment (e.g. plastics) and chromatography columns. In fact, when using an anion exchanger to remove pyrogens, it is necessary to clean the column with NaOH after each batch.

== Preventive methods ==
Because virtually all raw materials involved in a production process, including factory employees, can be potential sources of pyrogen contamination, raw material screening and depyrogenation can often go a long way to ensuring the final product is free of pyrogens and does not require costly removal or inactivation methods. Ultrafiltration of chemicals and buffer solutions, applying appropriate hygienic practices, and performing regular tests can all be helpful.

== See also ==
- Endotoxin
- Downstream processing
