= MATCAP1 =

Protein-coding gene in the species Homo sapiens

Identifiers
- Aliases: MATCAP1, KIAA0895 like, KIAA0895L, microtubule associated tyrosine carboxypeptidase 1
- External IDs: MGI: 1921606; GeneCards: MATCAP1
Enzyme activity
EC #	BRENDA	ExPASy	KEGG	MetaCyc
3.4.17.17	↗	↗	↗	↗

Gene location (Human)
Chr.	Chromosome 16 (human)
Band	16q22.1	Start	67,175,599 bp
Band	16q22.1	End	67,184,040 bp

Gene location (Mouse)
Chr.	Chromosome 8 (mouse)
Band	8|8 D3	Start	106,007,041 bp
Band	8|8 D3	End	106,016,496 bp
RNA expression pattern
Bgee	Human / Mouse (ortholog); Top expressed in: right hemisphere of cerebellum; anterior pituitary; right ovary; left ovary; right adrenal gland; right uterine tube; right adrenal cortex; left uterine tube; left adrenal cortex; ganglionic eminence / Top expressed in: otic vesicle; seminiferous tubule; neural tube; Rostral migratory stream; spermatid; ganglionic eminence; lumbar spinal ganglion; neural layer of retina; trigeminal ganglion; hand; More reference expression data
BioGPS	n/a
Orthologs
Databases	NCBI: entry; OMA: entry
Species	Human	Mouse
Entrez	653319	74356
Ensembl	ENSG00000196123	ENSMUSG00000014837
UniProt	Q68EN5	Q810A5
RefSeq (mRNA)	NM_001040715	NM_001166394; NM_028888
RefSeq (protein)	NP_001035805; NP_001356609; NP_001356610; NP_001356611; NP_001356613 NP_001356614; NP_001356615; NP_001356616	NP_001159866; NP_083164
Location (UCSC)	Chr 16: 67.18 – 67.18 Mb	Chr 8: 106.01 – 106.02 Mb
PubMed search
- Wikidata
View/Edit Human	View/Edit Mouse

Microtubule-associated tyrosine carboxypeptidase 1 is an enzyme that in humans is encoded by the MATCAP1 gene (previously KIAA0895L). It is a protease, which removes a tyrosine from the (C-terminal) end of cytoskeleton proteins called alpha tubulin. In this way, it helps regulate the function and dynamics of alpha tubulin.

== Gene ==
MATCAP1 is located at q22.1 on chromosome 16 of the human genome. Its genomic DNA consists of 8,379 base pairs. MATCAP1 is located between EXOC3L and E2F4 on the right, and NOL3 and HSF4 on the left. The promoter for MATCAP1 is located on chromosome 16 and spans 67217367-67218383bp.

MATCAP1 was first documented by the Mammalian Gene Collection Program Team in 2002. There are several patents on MATCAP1, two of those being patent US 6943241 and patent EP1308459.

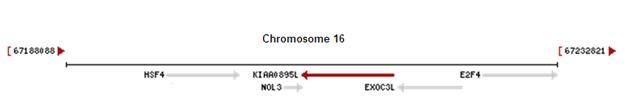

== Species distribution ==
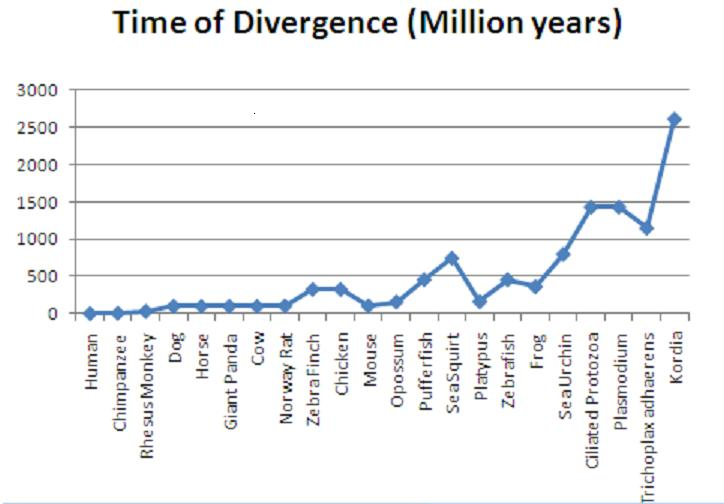

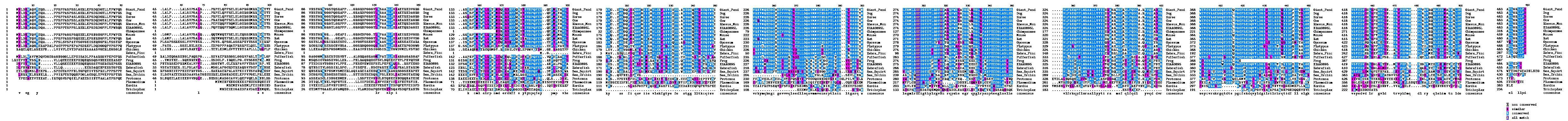

MATCAP1 orthologs can be found in all mammals. It is not found in plants, archaea, or fungi. MATCAP1 has a single paralog, known as MATCAP2.

The known orthologs of MATCAP1 are listed below:

- Chimpanzee – LOC741288
- Rhesus monkey – LOC696623
- Dog – LOC489765
- Horse – LOC100053028
- Giant panda – PANDA_006923
- Cow – LOC512420
- Norway rat – LOC688736
- Zebra finch – LOC100223241
- Chicken – LOC415660
- Mouse – LOC74356
- Opossum – LOC100019983
- Puffer fish – Unnamed
- Sea squirt – LOC100177006
- Platypus – LOC100078127
- Zebrafish – LOC562097
- Frog – LOC100135412
- Sea urchin – KIAA0895
- Ciliated protozoa – TTherm_01042050
- Plasmodium – PY05482
- Trichoplax adherens – TRIADDRAFT_62861
- Kordia – KAOT1_03617

== Structure ==
Domain of unknown function 1704

Identifiers
- Symbol: DUF1704
- Pfam: PF08014
- InterPro: IPR012548
Available protein structures:
- PDB: IPR012548 PF08014 (ECOD; PDBsum)
- AlphaFold: IPR012548; PF08014

MATCAP1 is composed of 471 amino acids (53.5kDa). A proline-rich region was also revealed at 14-65 amino acids. There is also an area of low complexity at 2913-2917 bp in the 3’ UTR region. There is a conserved domain of unknown function, known as DUF1704, located at 1390-2083 bp.

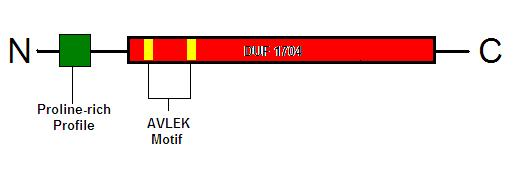

== Predicted post translational modifications ==
The following is a list of predicted post translational modifications found for MATCAP1. These are predicted in all mammalian orthologs in the public sequence database.

type of modification	residues modified
O-GlaNAc glycosylation	T19, T96, T174, and T314
Ser, Thr, and Tyr phosphorylation	S16, S20, S23, S31, S80, S82, S85, S88, S136, S349, S419, T96, T112, T125, T284, T379, T406, Y84, Y360, and Y420
Kinase-specific phosphorylation	T96 and T125

== Tissue distribution ==
MATCAP1 is expressed in many tissues of the body such as brain, testis, mammary glands, bladder, and the eye.

== Clinical significance ==
MATCAP1 has been shown to be up regulated in lymphoblastoid cells from males with autism that is caused by an expansion of a CGG repeat in the promoter region of the fragile X mental retardation 1 gene located at Xq27.3 as well as in cells with a 15q11-q13 mutation.
