= MATCAP2 =

Protein-coding gene in the species Homo sapiens

Identifiers
- Aliases: MATCAP2, 9530077C05Rik, 1110003N12Rik, Kiaa0895, mKIAA0895, KIAA0895, microtubule associated tyrosine carboxypeptidase 2
- External IDs: MGI: 1915533; GeneCards: MATCAP2

Gene location (Human)
Chr.	Chromosome 7 (human)
Band	7p14.2	Start	36,324,152 bp
Band	7p14.2	End	36,390,125 bp

Gene location (Mouse)
Chr.	Chromosome 9 (mouse)
Band	9|9 A3	Start	22,322,809 bp
Band	9|9 A3	End	22,355,977 bp
RNA expression pattern
Bgee	Human / Mouse (ortholog); Top expressed in: Epithelium of choroid plexus; bronchial epithelial cell; gonad; germinal epithelium; islet of Langerhans; mucosa of paranasal sinus; retinal pigment epithelium; cerebellar cortex; cerebellar hemisphere; testicle / Top expressed in: spermatocyte; spermatid; seminiferous tubule; granulocyte; lumbar spinal ganglion; vestibular membrane of cochlear duct; facial motor nucleus; otolith organ; utricle; embryo; More reference expression data
BioGPS	n/a
Orthologs
Databases	NCBI: entry; OMA: entry
Species	Human	Mouse
Entrez	23366	68283
Ensembl	ENSG00000164542	ENSMUSG00000036411
UniProt	Q8NCT3	Q7TQE7
RefSeq (mRNA)	NM_001100425; NM_001199706; NM_001199707; NM_001199708; NM_001300956 NM_015314	NM_026739; NM_183273; NM_001378982; NM_001378983
RefSeq (protein)	NP_001093895; NP_001186635; NP_001186636; NP_001186637; NP_001287885 NP_056129	NP_081015; NP_001365911; NP_001365912
Location (UCSC)	Chr 7: 36.32 – 36.39 Mb	Chr 9: 22.32 – 22.36 Mb
PubMed search
- Wikidata
View/Edit Human	View/Edit Mouse

Putative tyrosine carboxypeptidase MATCAP2 is a protein that in humans is encoded by the MATCAP2 gene (previously KIAA0895). It is predicted to have carboxypeptidase activity (like its paralog MATCAP1), but this has yet to be confirmed.

== Gene ==
=== Locus ===
The MATCAP2 gene is located at 7p14.2. The genomic DNA is 65,976 base pairs long, while the longest mRNA that it produces is 4463 bases long.

It can be transcribed into 15 transcript variants, which in turn can produce 13 different isoforms of the protein.

The location of the MATCAP2 gene on chromosome 7

=== Gene Neighborhood ===
MATCAP2 is surrounded by the following genes on chromosome 7:

- EEPD1
- MARK2P7
- ANLN
- LOC111365168
- AOAH

=== Size of gene ===
The gene encoded for the MATCAP2 protein is 65,975 nucleotides long, from nucleotides 36324150 to 36390125, with seven exons.

== mRNA ==
There are ten different isoforms for MATCAP2.

- NP_001093895.1
- EAW94064.1
- NP_056129.2
- NP_001186636.1
- NP_001186635.1
- XP_005249746.1
- EAW94065.1
- XP_024302470.1
- NP_001186637.1
- NP_001287885.1

== Protein ==
The longest protein isoform that is produced by the MATCAP2 gene is termed LOC23366 isoform 1 and is 520 amino acids long. The predicted molecular weight is 61kDa. Additionally, the theoretical isoelectric point is 10.

=== Amino acid composition ===
MATCAP2 is a lysine and arginine semi-enriched protein. MATCAP2 is semi-enriched in positively charged lysine and arginine groups, and positively and negatively charged lysine, arginine, glutamic acid and aspartic acid groups. However, MATCAP2 is semi-depleted in non-polar alanine, glycine and proline groups.

The charge distribution analysis shows that there are no negative or mixed charge clusters. However, there is one positive charge cluster from amino acids 12 to 36.

Domain of unknown function 1704

Identifiers
- Symbol: DUF1704
- Pfam: PF08014
- InterPro: IPR012548
Available protein structures:
- PDB: IPR012548 PF08014 (ECOD; PDBsum)
- AlphaFold: IPR012548; PF08014

=== Regions ===
LOC23366 contains a protein domain of unknown function called DUF1704. It also contains a region of low complexity from position 120 to position 150 in the protein, and an arginine-rich area from position 12 to position 51.

=== Promoters ===
Using ElDorado by Genomatrix, a promoter region sequence was found. The most likely promoter for MATCAP2 starts at 36389926 and goes to 36391149, with a length of 1224.

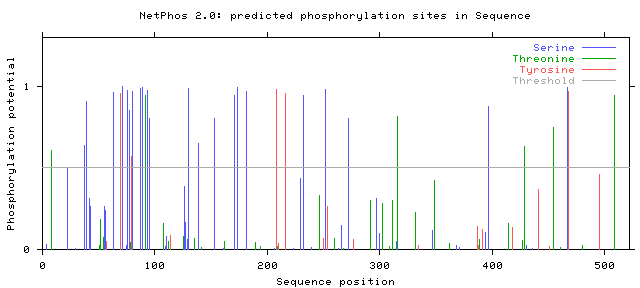
The predicted serine, threonine, and tyrosine phosphorylation sites of the MATCAP2 protein

=== Post-translational modification ===
MATCAP2 is predicted to undergo phosphorylation at several serines, threonines, and tyrosines throughout its structure. Phosphorylation at these sites is a form of gene regulation. Phosphorylation results in a conformational change in the structure of many enzymes and receptors. This causes them to become activated or deactivated.

=== Stem loops ===
Using a database called Mfold, a stem-loop formation for the 5' UTR region shows that there is a lack of conservation, meaning there is some precedence that these stems and loops are not used for translation regulation. The ΔG value was -12.90 kcal/mol with three loops. Using the same database, a stem-loop formation for the 3' UTR region shows that there is conservation, meaning there is some precedence that they are used for translation regulation. The ΔG value was -636.80 kcal/mol.

=== Tertiary structure ===
MATCAP2 has a tertiary structure with alpha helices and beta sheets.

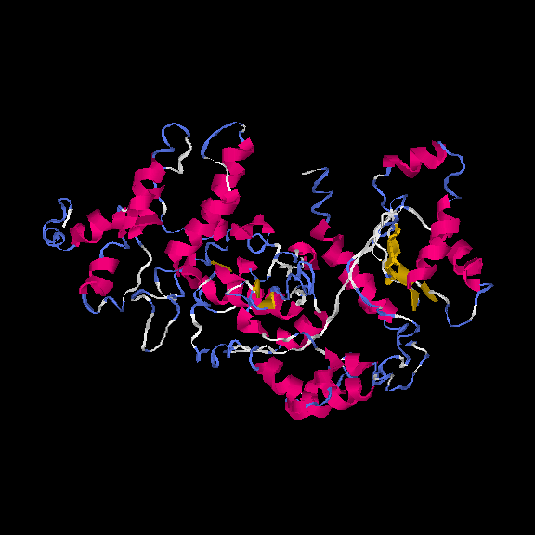
Proposed Tertiary Structure for MATCAP2.

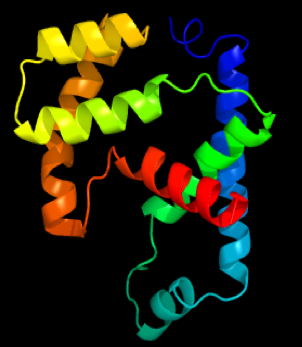
Proposed Tertiary Structure for 24% of MATCAP2. Image coloured by rainbow N → C terminus.

=== Interacting proteins ===
There are three proteins likely to be interacting proteins with MATCAP2. These proteins are ELAVL1, vata, and glym. These interactions have experimental evidence from the sources provided.

== Expression ==
MATCAP2 is most commonly found in the testis, however it also has a strong expression in the kidneys, adrenal glands, and brain.

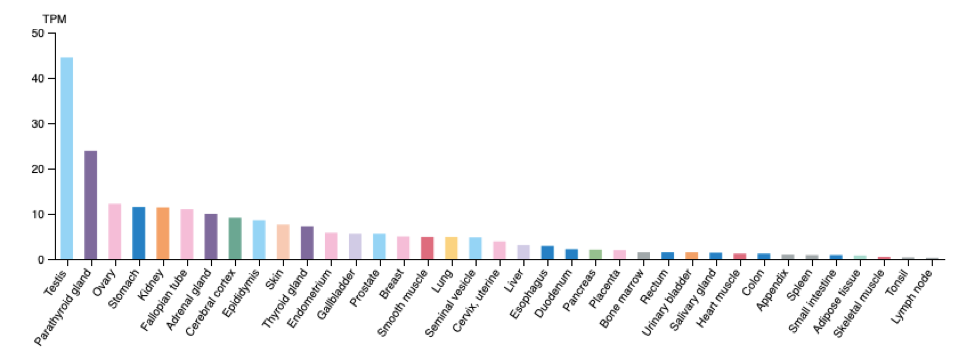
RNA-seq tissue data is reported as mean TPM (transcripts per million).

The Mean RPKM values for MATCAP2 in 27 different tissue types.

=== Per Health State ===
Using an EST profile from NCBI, MATCAP2 has strong expression in cervical tumors and bladder carcinoma.

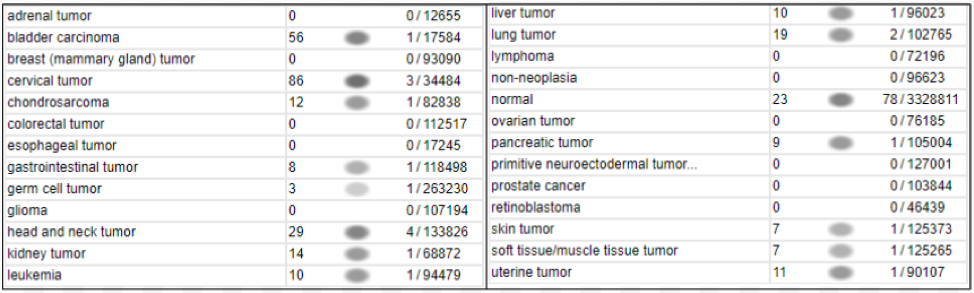
An EST profile was created by NCBI. EST profiles show approximate gene expression patterns as inferred from EST counts and the cDNA library sources.

== Interacting proteins ==
Using three different databases, three different interacting proteins were found. These include ELAVL1, VATA, and GLYM. There was experimental evidence for all three of these interacting proteins.

== Homologs and orthologs ==
MATCAP2 has over 228 orthologs. Orthologs have been found in mammals and eukaryotes. There are homologs in 9 species. The full list of organisms in which homologs have been found is given below.

- Pan troglodytes
- Macaca mulatta
- Canis lupus familiaris
- Bos taurus
- Mus musculus
- Rattus
- Gallus gallus domesticus
- Danio rerio
- Anura

== Paralogs ==
MATCAP2 has 7 paralogs in Homo sapiens:

- Unnamed protein product
- Uncharacterized protein KIAA0895-like
- hCG28832, isoform CRA_a
- Hypothetical protein
- Unnamed protein product
- hCG38687, isoform CRA_a, partial
- hCG38687, isoform CRA_b
