= KDKA =

KDKA may refer to:

- KDKA (AM), a radio station (1020 AM) licensed to Pittsburgh, Pennsylvania, United States
- KDKA-TV, a television station (channel 2) licensed to Pittsburgh, Pennsylvania, United States
- KDKA-FM, a radio station (93.7 FM) licensed to Pittsburgh, Pennsylvania, United States
- WPKD-TV, a television station (channel 19) licensed to Jeannette, Pennsylvania, United States, branded on air as KDKA+
- WLTJ, a radio station (92.9 FM) licensed to Pittsburgh, Pennsylvania, United States, which used the call letters KDKA-FM until 1979
- 3-Deoxy-D-manno-octulosonic acid kinase, an enzyme
