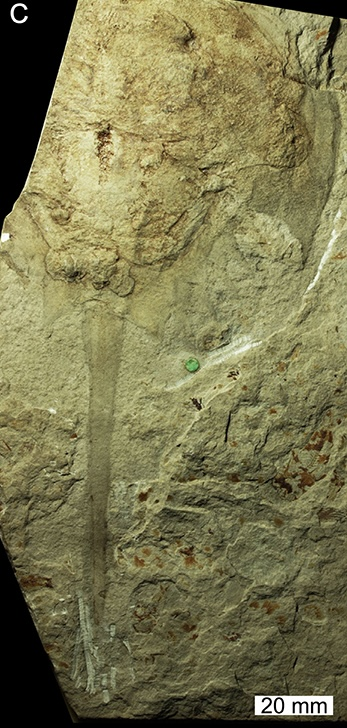
- NHMUK PI. OR. 59783, the holotype

Scientific classification
- Kingdom: Animalia
- Phylum: Arthropoda
- Subphylum: Chelicerata
- Order: Xiphosura
- Family: Limulidae
- Genus: Tachypleus
- Species: †T. syriacus

Binomial name
- †Tachypleus syriacus (Woodward, 1879)

Synonyms
- †Mesolimulus syriacus (Woodward, 1879)

= Tachypleus syriacus =

Tachypleus syriacus Temporal range: Late Cretaceous (Cenomanian)

Species of horseshoe crab

Tachypleus syriacus is an extinct species of horseshoe crab in the genus Tachypleus that lived in the Sannine Formation of Lebanon during the Cenomanian of the Late Cretaceous Epoch. It is one of two fossil species within the genus Tachypleus.

== Works cited ==
- James C. Lamsdell; Scott C. McKenzie (2015). "Tachypleus syriacus (Woodward)—a sexually dimorphic Cretaceous crown limulid reveals underestimated horseshoe crab divergence times". Organisms Diversity & Evolution. 15 (4): 681–693. doi:10.1007/s13127-015-0229-3. Wikidata Q64081837.
- Bicknell, Russell Dean Christopher; Tom Brougham; Sylvain Charbonnier; Frédéric Sautereau; Tomaž Hitij; Nicolás E. Campione (2019). "On the appendicular anatomy of the xiphosurid Tachypleus syriacus and the evolution of fossil horseshoe crab appendages". The Science of Nature. 106 (7–8): 38. doi:10.1007/s00114-019-1629-6. PMID 31209559. Wikidata Q92828019.
