= Core oligosaccharide =

Short chain of sugar residues within Gram-negative lipopolysaccharide

Lipopolysaccharide. The core includes both the inner and outer core.

Core oligosaccharide (or Core-OS) is a short chain of sugar residues within Gram-negative lipopolysaccharide (LPS). Core-OS are highly diverse among bacterial species and even within strains of species

== Structure ==
Core-OS Structure and Metabolic Pathways: oligosaccharide from Escherichia coli R1. Inner core is represented in green and outer core is represented in blue.

The core domain always contains an oligosaccharide component which attaches directly to lipid A and commonly contains sugars such as heptose and 3-deoxy-D-mannooctulosonic acid (also known as KDO or keto-deoxyoctulosonate). The LPS Cores of many bacteria also contain non-carbohydrate components, such as phosphate, amino acids, and ethanolamine substituents.

Many core structures have been described in the literature, this description is based on the traditional general structure (as found in enteric bacteria and Pseudomonas). See the figure above for an overview of the structure found in E. coli R1.

=== Inner core ===
The "base" of the inner core is 1–3 KDO residues. The last KDO is often modified with a phosphate or ethanolamine group. From the KDOs, there are attached 2–3 heptoses (i.e. L-glycero-D-mannoheptulose) that are usually phosphorylated. These KDO and heptoses comprise the "inner core". The ketosidic bond between KDO and lipid A (α2→6) is especially susceptible to acid cleavage. LPS researchers use a weak acid treatment to separate the lipid and polysaccharide portions of LPS.

An LPS molecule that includes only a lipid A and an inner core (or less. See example) is referred to as "deep-rough LPS".

=== Outer core ===
The outer core is made of hexose residues that are attached to the last heptose residue in the inner core. Hexoses often found in the outer core include: D-glucose, D-mannose, D-galactose, etc.. There are usually at least three hexoses bound β1→3, with the O antigen being ligated to the third hexose. Other hexose are often found attached to the outer core, branching from the main oligomer.

LPS that include lipid A and a complete core oligosaccharide (inner and outer) is referred to as "rough LPS."

== Biosynthesis ==
The enzymes involved in core oligosaccharide synthesis are conserved among Escherichia coli and Salmonella. Pseudomonas aeruginosa has some unique enzymes.

== Function ==
The mechanism whereby the core oligosaccharide of lipopolysaccharide affect the membrane behavior is not well understood.

== See also ==
- Endotoxin
