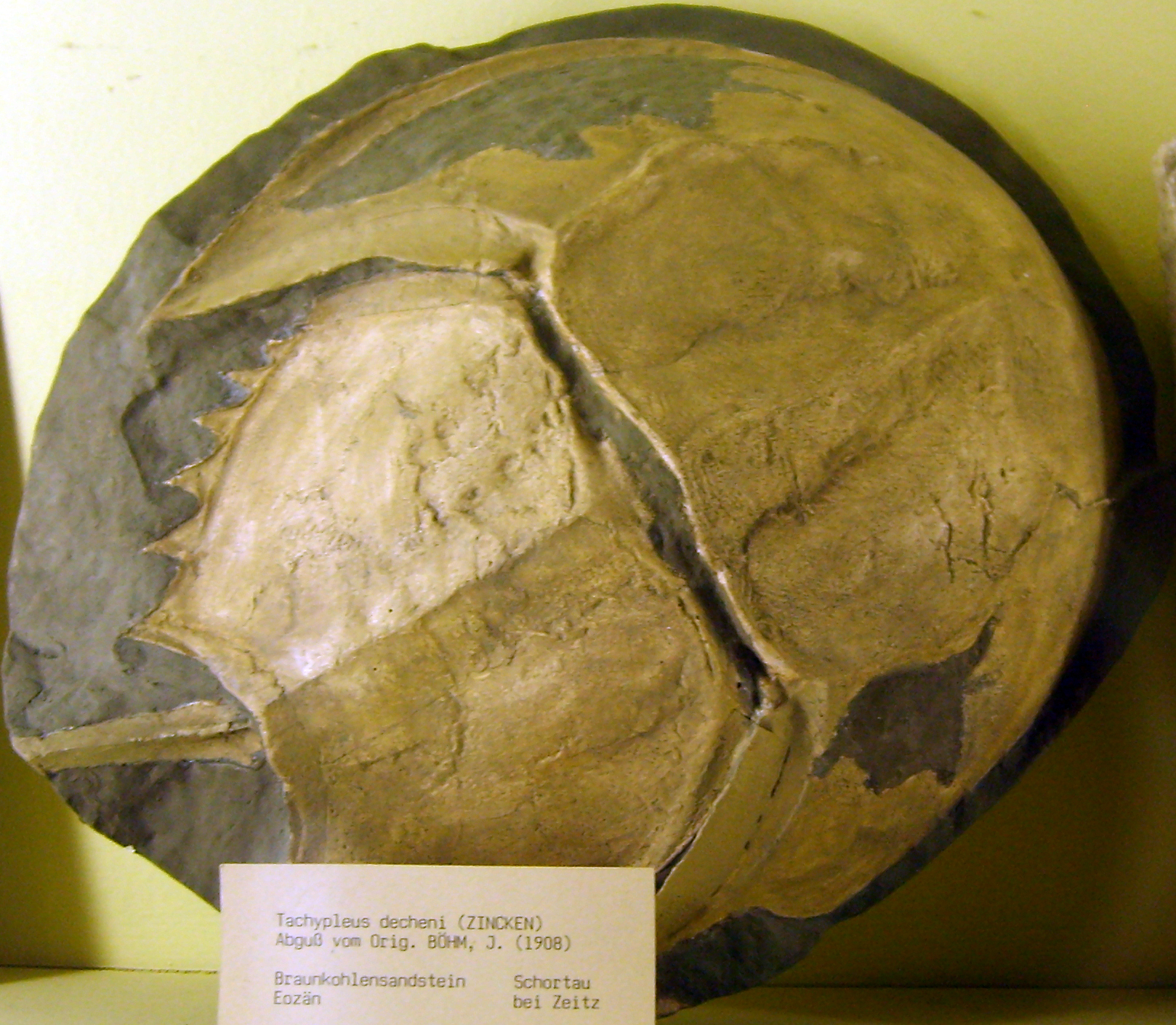
- Tachypleus decheni cast at the Museum für Naturkunde, Berlin

Scientific classification
- Kingdom: Animalia
- Phylum: Arthropoda
- Subphylum: Chelicerata
- Order: Xiphosura
- Family: Limulidae
- Genus: Tachypleus
- Species: T. decheni

Binomial name
- Tachypleus decheni (Zinken, 1862)

Synonyms
- †Limulus decheni Zinken, 1862

= Tachypleus decheni =

Tachypleus decheni Temporal range: Upper Eocene

Extinct species of horseshoe crab

Tachypleus decheni is an extinct species of horseshoe crab in the genus Tachypleus that lived in the Borna Formation of Germany, during the Upper Eocene. It is one of two fossil species within the genus Tachypleus.
