= Limulus clotting factor B =

Identifiers
- EC no.: 3.4.21.85
- CAS no.: 848851-53-6

Databases
- IntEnz: IntEnz view
- BRENDA: BRENDA entry
- ExPASy: NiceZyme view
- KEGG: KEGG entry
- MetaCyc: metabolic pathway
- PRIAM: profile
- PDB structures: RCSB PDB PDBe PDBsum
Search
- PMC: articles
- PubMed: articles
- NCBI: proteins

Limulus clotting factor B (EC 3.4.21.85) is an enzyme. This enzyme catalyses the following chemical reaction:

Selective cleavage of -Arg^{98}-Ile^{99}- bond in limulus proclotting enzyme to form active clotting enzyme

This enzyme is present in the hemocyte granules of the horseshoe crabs Limulus and Tachypleus. In the immunity-related clotting pathways of these organisms, factor B is downstream of Limulus clotting factor C, but upstream of Limulus clotting enzyme.
