= Acyloxyacyl hydrolase =

Protein family

acyloxyacyl hydrolase
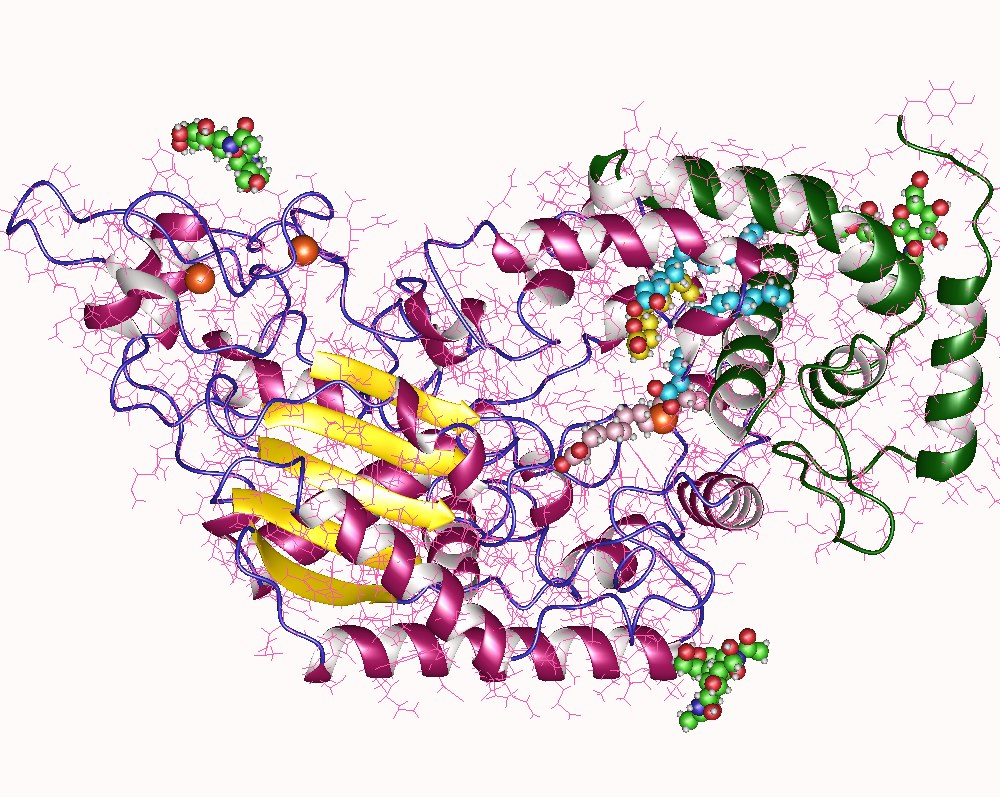
- Acyloxyacyl hydrolase heterodimer, Human

Identifiers
- EC no.: 3.1.1.77

Databases
- BRENDA: enzyme data
- ExPASy: NiceZyme view
- KEGG: enzyme entry
- MetaCyc: metabolic pathway
- Rhea: reactions
- PDB structures: RCSB PDB PDBe PDBsum
- Gene Ontology: AmiGO / QuickGO
Search
- PMC: articles
- PubMed: articles
- NCBI: proteins

The enzyme acyloxyacyl hydrolase (EC 3.1.1.77, AOAH) was discovered because it catalyzes the reaction

3-(acyloxy)acyl group of bacterial toxin + H_{2}O = 3-hydroxyacyl group of bacterial toxin + a fatty acid

The enzyme removes from lipid A the secondary acyl chains that are needed for lipopolysaccharides to be recognized by the MD-2--TLR4 receptor on animal cells. This reaction inactivates the lipopolysaccharide (endotoxin); the tetraacyl lipid A product can inhibit LPS signaling. Acyloxyacyl hydrolase is produced by monocyte-macrophages, neutrophils, dendritic cells, NK cells, ILC1 cells, and renal cortical tubule cells. It is a protein of about 60 kDa that has two disulfide-linked subunits. The smaller subunit, of about 14 kDa (including glycosylation), is a member of the SAPLIP (saposin-like protein) family along with amoebapore, granulysin, acid sphingomyelinase, surfactant protein B, and the 4 sphingolipid activator proteins (saposins). The larger subunit, of 50 kDa, contains the active site serine and the other elements of the His-Asp-Ser triad; AOAH is a GDSL lipase that has activity toward certain glycerolipids in addition to its presumed major in vivo substrate, LPS. Also see "AOAH".
