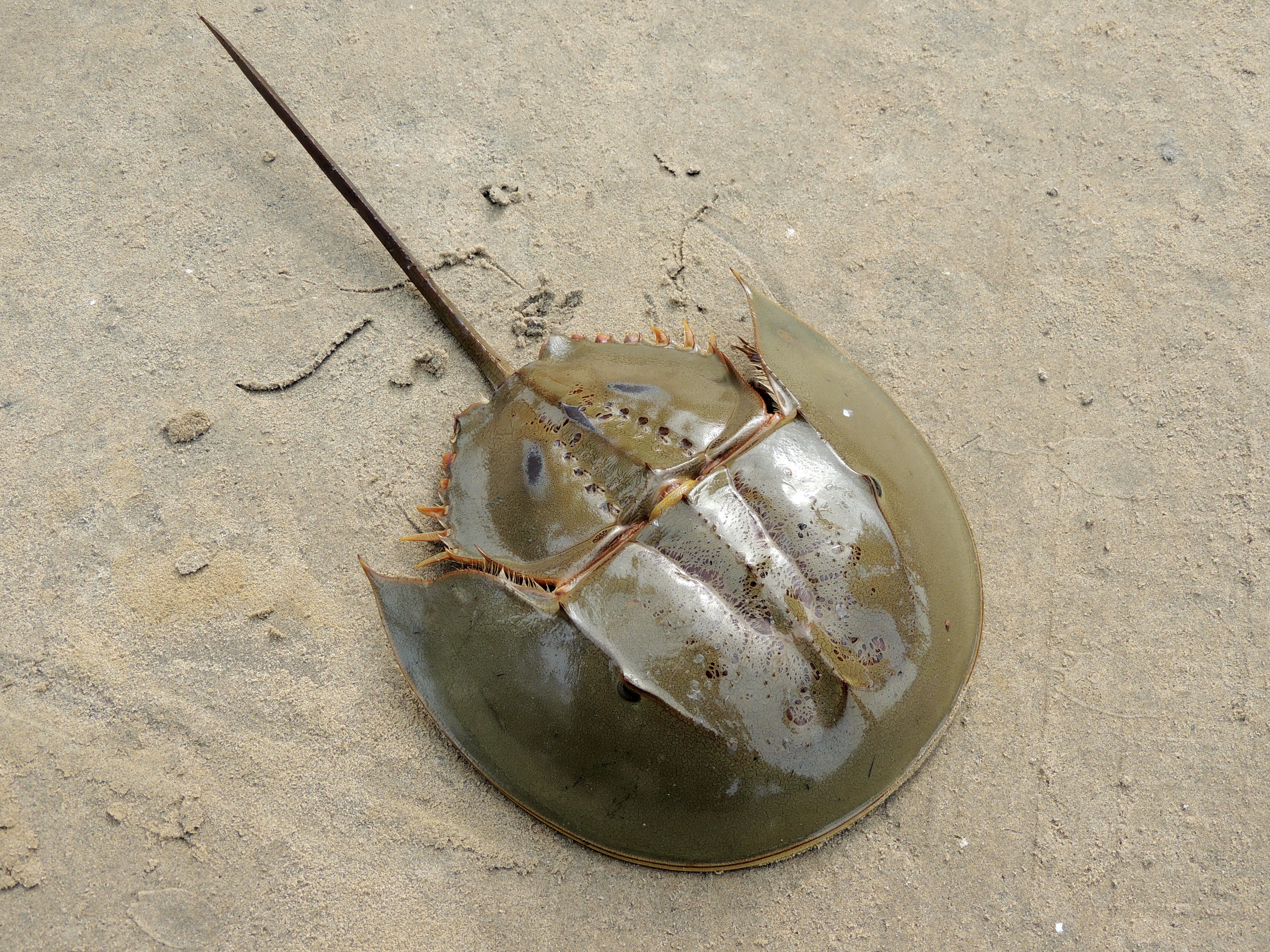
- Female, off the Bay of Bengal

Conservation status
- Data Deficient (IUCN 2.3)

Scientific classification
- Kingdom: Animalia
- Phylum: Arthropoda
- Subphylum: Chelicerata
- Order: Xiphosura
- Family: Limulidae
- Genus: Tachypleus
- Species: T. gigas

Binomial name
- Tachypleus gigas (Müller, 1785)

Synonyms
- Limulus gigas Müller, 1785; Limulus moluccanus Latreille, 1802

= Tachypleus gigas =

Species of arthropod

Tachypleus gigas, commonly known as the Indo-Pacific horseshoe crab, Indonesian horseshoe crab, Indian horseshoe crab, or southern horseshoe crab, is one of the four extant (living) species of horseshoe crab. It is found in coastal water in South and Southeast Asia at depths to 40 m (130 ft).

== Description ==
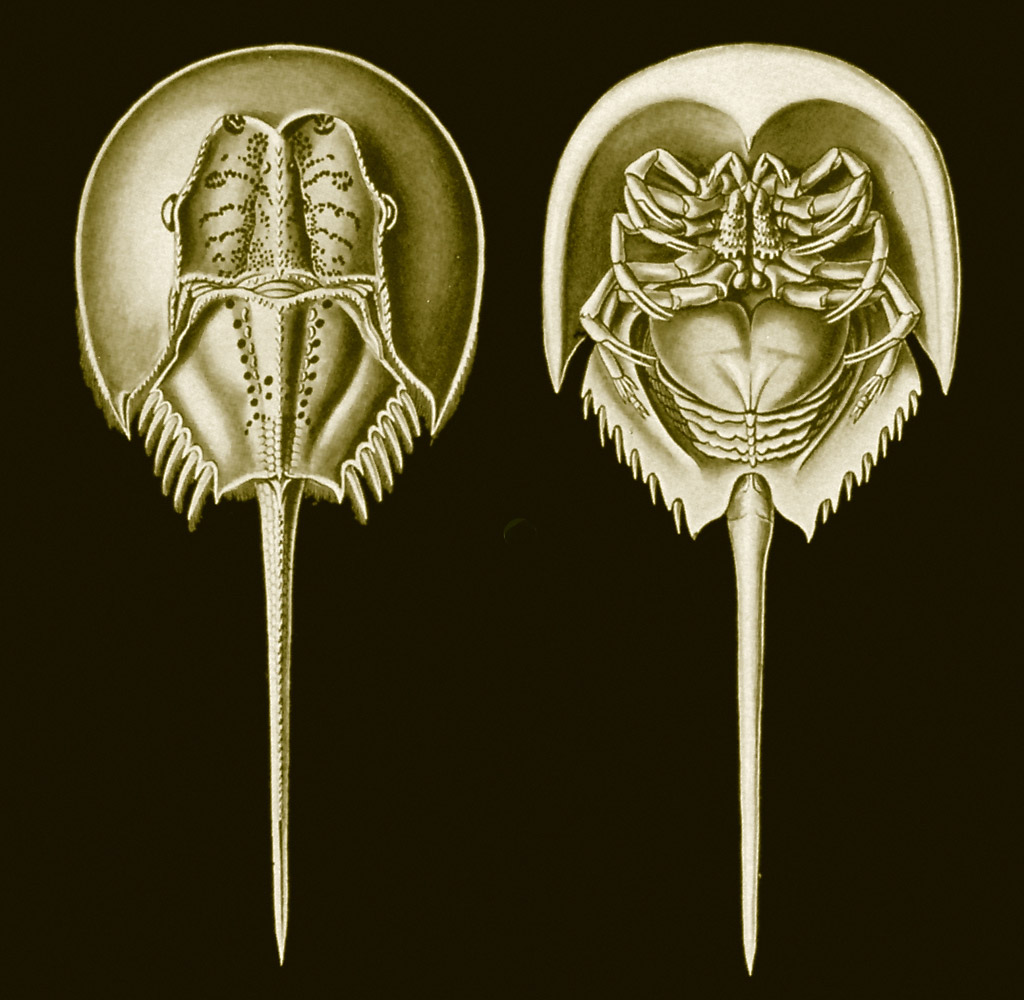
Illustrations of male from above and below. Notice that the illustration from below incorrectly shows all walking legs as scissor-like, as in females (in males, the two frontal pairs of walking legs have hooks)

It grows up to about 50 cm (20 in) long, including the tail, and is covered by a sturdy carapace that is up to about 26.5 cm (10.4 in) wide.

Tachypleus gigas has a sage-green chitinous exoskeleton. Like other horseshoe crabs, the carapace of T. gigas consists of a larger frontal one (the prosoma) and a smaller, spine-edged rear one (the opisthosoma). There are six pairs of prosomal appendages/legs, consisting of a small frontal pair in front of the mouth and five larger walking/pushing legs on either side of the mouth. The book gills are located on the underside of the opisthosoma. They have a long spiny tail known as the telson. The tail bears a crest dorsally and is concave ventrally, giving it an essentially triangular cross section.

Despite the scientific name T. gigas, the close relative Tachypleus tridentatus reaches a larger size. Both are considerably larger than Carcinoscorpius rotundicauda. The carapace which shields the prosoma also bears two pairs of eyes – a pair of simple eyes at the front, and a pair of compound eyes positioned laterally. In common with other horseshoe crabs, T. gigas also has ventral eyes near the mouthparts, and photoreceptors in the caudal spine.

=== Sexual difference ===
Like the other species, females of T. gigas grow larger than males. On average in Sarawak, Malaysia, females are about 42 cm (17 in) long, including a tail that is about 20 cm (7.9 in), and their carapace (prosoma) is about 22 cm (8.7 in) wide. In comparison, the average for males is about 34 cm (13 in) long, including a tail that is about 17.5 cm (6.9 in), and their carapace is about 17.5 cm (6.9 in) wide. There are some geographic variations in the average size, but most are similar to, or somewhat smaller, than the ones from Sarawak. An outlier are individuals from West Bengal in India where the average carapace width only is about 17 cm (6.7 in) and 14 cm (5.5 in) in females and males respectively. The largest females of the species reach a total length of more than 50 cm (20 in) and can weigh more than 1.8 kg (4.0 lb).

In addition to their smaller size, males have a paler and rougher carapace, act as hosts to a greater number of epibionts, have six (instead of three) long spines on either side of the rear carapace, and their two front pairs of walking legs, prosomal appendages two and three, have hooks (they are scissor-like in females). Juveniles (both sexes) also have six long spines on either side of the rear carapace, similar to adult males.

== Distribution and habitat ==
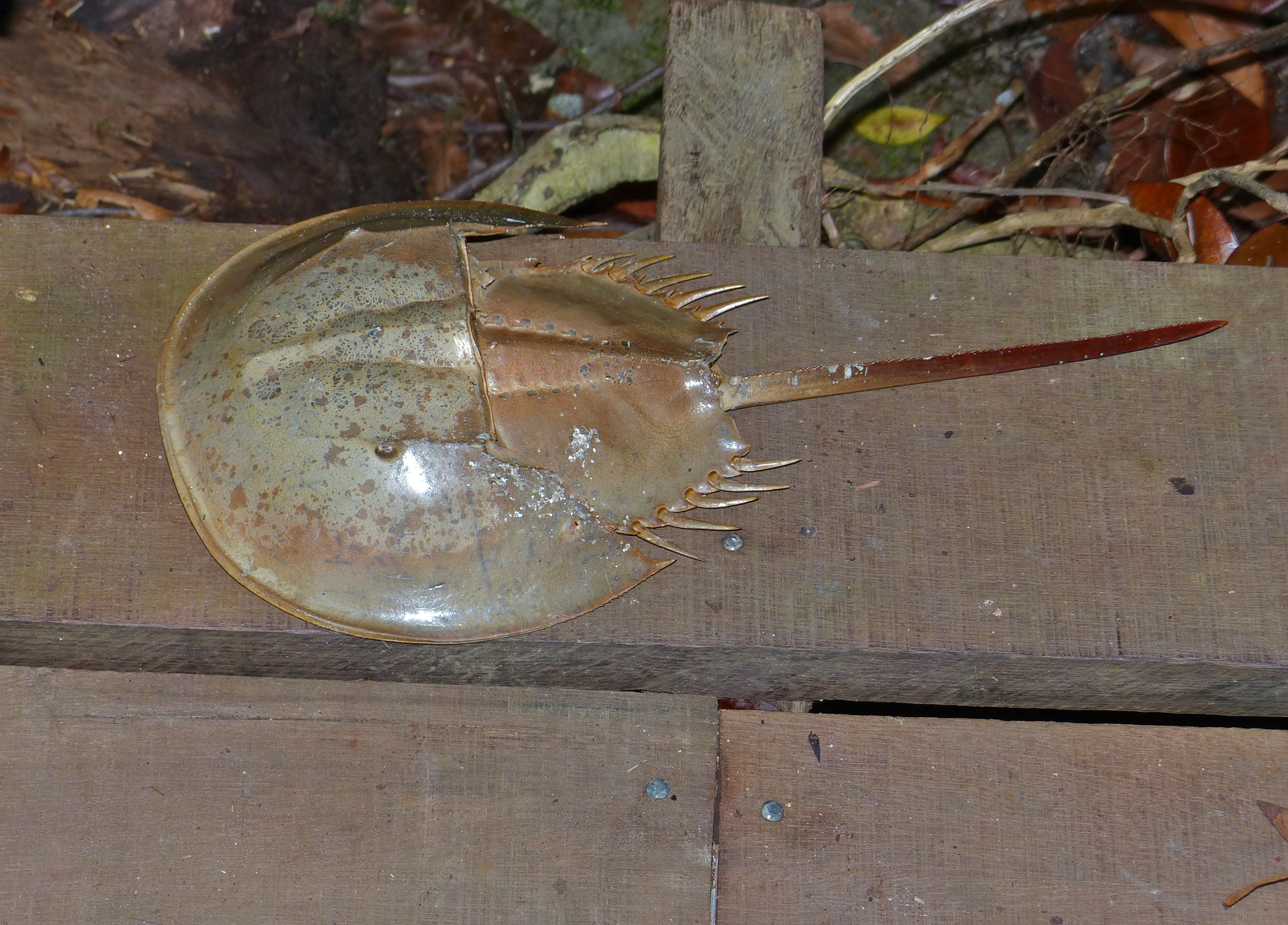
Male found dead in Bako National Park, Malaysia

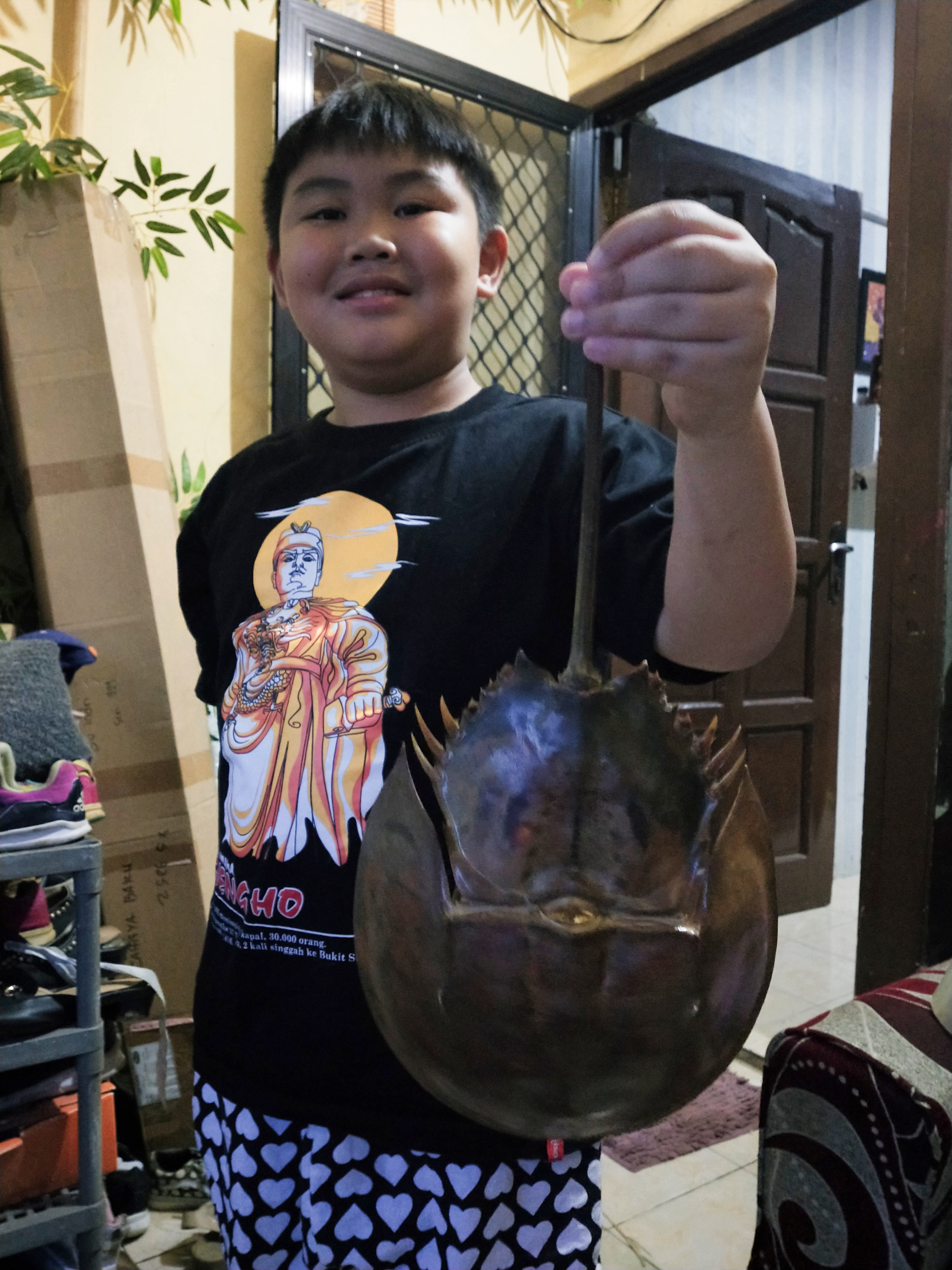
Individual horseshoe crab found dead on Indonesian shore

Tachypleus gigas is one of three living species of horseshoe crabs in Asia, the others being Tachypleus tridentatus and Carcinoscorpius rotundicauda. The fourth living species, Limulus polyphemus, is found in the Americas. The last common horseshoe originates from a body of water called the Tethys Sea, existing during the Mesozoic area. The species diverged and the organisms that journeys east are the ancestors of the modern Asian horseshoe crab, with T. Gigas preferring the southern coast of China.T. gigas is found in tropical South and Southeast Asia, ranging from the Bay of Bengal to the South China Sea, with records from India, Malaysia, Singapore, Indonesia, Thailand, Vietnam and the Philippines. Although records are lacking, it likely also occurs in Myanmar.

Tachypleus gigas inhabits seagrass meadows, sandy and muddy shores at depths to 40 m (130 ft); it is the only horseshoe crab to have been observed swimming at the surface of the ocean. It occurs in both marine and brackish waters in salinities down to 15 PSU, but their eggs only hatch above 20 PSU.

== Breeding ==
The lifecycle of T. gigas is relatively long and involves a large number of instars. The eggs are about 3.7 mm (0.15 in) in diameter. The freshly hatched larvae, known as trilobite larvae, have no tail, and are 8 mm (0.31 in) long. Males are thought to pass through 12 moults before reaching sexual maturity, while females pass through 13 moults.

== Ecology ==
The diet of T. gigas is chiefly composed of molluscs, detritus, and polychaetes, which it seeks on the ocean floor. House crows have been observed to turn T. gigas over and eat the soft underside, while gulls only attack individuals that are already stranded upside-down.

Since horseshoe crabs do not moult after they have reached sexual maturity, they are often colonised by epibionts. The dominant diatoms are species of the genera Navicula, Nitzschia, and Skeletonema. Among the larger organisms, the sea anemone Metridium, the bryozoan Membranipora, the barnacle Balanus amphitrite, and the bivalves Anomia and Crassostrea are the most frequent colonists of T. gigas. Rarer epibionts include green algae, flatworms, tunicates, isopods, amphipods, gastropods, mussels, pelecypods, annelids, and polychaetes.

== Conservation ==
Tachypleus gigas is listed as Data Deficient on the IUCN Red List.

== Taxonomy ==
Tachypleus gigas was first described by Otto Friedrich Müller in 1785. It was originally placed in the genus Limulus, but was transferred to the genus Tachypleus by Reginald Innes Pocock in 1902.

Tachypleus gigas is estimated to have diverged from the other Asian species of horseshoe crab 52.5 million years ago. While it is clear that the American horseshoe crab Limulus polyphemus is distinct from the remaining extant species of horseshoe crab, relationships within the Asian horseshoe crabs remains uncertain. T. gigas has a chromosome number of 2n = 28, compared to 26 in T. tridentatus, 32 in Carcinoscorpius, and 52 in Limulus.

== Use in medicine ==
The horseshoe crab's blood is used in human medicine to identify bacterial contamination; it coagulates when coming into contact with toxins released by bacteria. While synthetic alternatives have been developed, horseshoe crab blood is still used in pharmaceutical applications, especially for the development of vaccines. The perivitelline fluid of this species is able to promote cell differentiation and growth in human umbilical cord cells.
