= EXOC3L =

Protein-coding gene in the species Homo sapiens

EXOC3L1

Identifiers
- Aliases: EXOC3L1, EXOC3L, exocyst complex component 3 like 1
- External IDs: OMIM: 614117; MGI: 3041195; HomoloGene: 18629; GeneCards: EXOC3L1; OMA:EXOC3L1 - orthologs

Gene location (Human)
Chr.	Chromosome 16 (human)
Band	16q22.1	Start	67,184,379 bp
Band	16q22.1	End	67,190,185 bp

Gene location (Mouse)
Chr.	Chromosome 8 (mouse)
Band	8|8 D3	Start	106,016,556 bp
Band	8|8 D3	End	106,022,733 bp
RNA expression pattern
Bgee	Human / Mouse (ortholog); Top expressed in: spleen; right lung; right ovary; apex of heart; left ovary; right testis; right adrenal gland; upper lobe of left lung; right adrenal cortex; left testis / Top expressed in: yolk sac; meninges; embryo; right kidney; ventricular zone; dentate gyrus of hippocampal formation granule cell; spermatocyte; neural layer of retina; neural tube; muscle of thigh; More reference expression data
BioGPS	n/a
Gene ontology
Molecular function	SNARE binding; molecular function
Cellular component	exocyst; transport vesicle; secretory granule; cytoplasmic vesicle
Biological process	exocyst localization; peptide hormone secretion; exocytosis
Sources:Amigo / QuickGO
Orthologs
Species	Human	Mouse
Entrez	283849	277978
Ensembl	ENSG00000179044	ENSMUSG00000043251
UniProt	Q86VI1	Q8BI71
RefSeq (mRNA)	NM_178516	NM_177788; NM_001357379
RefSeq (protein)	NP_848611	NP_808456; NP_001344308
Location (UCSC)	Chr 16: 67.18 – 67.19 Mb	Chr 8: 106.02 – 106.02 Mb
PubMed search
- Wikidata
View/Edit Human	View/Edit Mouse

Exocyst complex component 3-like is a protein that in humans is encoded by the EXOC3L gene.
