= Limulus clotting factor C =

Limulus clotting factor overbar C

Identifiers
- EC no.: 3.4.21.84
- CAS no.: 115743-27-6

Databases
- BRENDA: enzyme data
- ExPASy: NiceZyme view
- KEGG: enzyme entry
- MetaCyc: metabolic pathway
- Rhea: reactions
- PDB structures: RCSB PDB PDBe PDBsum
Search
- PMC: articles
- PubMed: articles
- NCBI: proteins

Limulus clotting factor C

Identifiers
- Organism: Tachypleus tridentatus
- Symbol: ?
- Orthologs: OMA: entry
- UniProt: P28175
Search for
- Structures: Swiss-model
- Domains: InterPro

Limulus clotting factor overbar C (EC 3.4.21.84, factor C, limulus factor C) is an enzyme. This enzyme catalyses the following chemical reaction

Selective cleavage of -Arg^{103}-Ser- and -Ile^{124}-Ile- bonds in limulus clotting factor B to form factor overbar B.
Cleavage of -Pro-Arg- bonds in synthetic substrates

This enzyme is isolated from the hemocyte granules of the horseshoe crabs Limulus and Tachypleus, where it serves as a LPS endotoxin-sensitive trypsin type serine protease to protect the organism from bacterial infection, initiating a cascade leading to coagulin formation. From the N-terminus to the C-terminus, the domains are:

- EGF-like domain
- 3 Sushi domains
- one LCCL domain and one C-type lectin domain
- 2 more Sushi domains
- a trypsin domain

This enzyme is useful in Limulus amebocyte lysate as the endotoxin-detecting element. It can be produced recombinantly.
