= AOAH =

Protein-coding gene in the species Homo sapiens

Identifiers
- Aliases: AOAH, acyloxyacyl hydrolase
- External IDs: OMIM: 102593; MGI: 1350928; GeneCards: AOAH
Enzyme activity
EC #	BRENDA	ExPASy	KEGG	MetaCyc
3.1.1.77	↗	↗	↗	↗

Gene location (Human)
Chr.	Chromosome 7 (human)
Band	7p14.2	Start	36,512,941 bp
Band	7p14.2	End	36,724,549 bp

Gene location (Mouse)
Chr.	Chromosome 13 (mouse)
Band	13|13 A2	Start	20,978,283 bp
Band	13|13 A2	End	21,220,787 bp
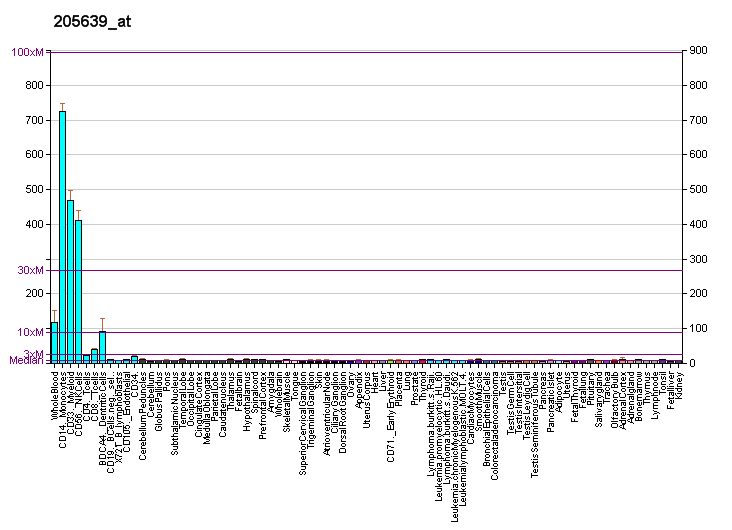
RNA expression pattern
Bgee	Human / Mouse (ortholog); Top expressed in: granulocyte; monocyte; blood; spleen; rectum; pancreatic ductal cell; appendix; mucosa of transverse colon; bone marrow cell; lymph node / Top expressed in: granulocyte; right kidney; stroma of bone marrow; proximal tubule; human kidney; blood; blastocyst; calvaria; gastrula; zygote; More reference expression data
BioGPS	More reference expression data
Gene ontology
Molecular function	hydrolase activity; hydrolase activity, acting on ester bonds; calcium ion binding; acyloxyacyl hydrolase activity; metal ion binding
Cellular component	extracellular region; cytoplasmic vesicle
Biological process	fatty acid metabolic process; lipopolysaccharide catabolic process; lipid metabolism
Sources:Amigo / QuickGO
Orthologs
Databases	NCBI: entry; OMA: entry
Species	Human	Mouse
Entrez	313	27052
Ensembl	ENSG00000136250	ENSMUSG00000021322
UniProt	P28039	O35298
RefSeq (mRNA)	NM_001177506; NM_001177507; NM_001637	NM_001281854; NM_012054
RefSeq (protein)	NP_001170977; NP_001170978; NP_001628	NP_001268783; NP_036184
Location (UCSC)	Chr 7: 36.51 – 36.72 Mb	Chr 13: 20.98 – 21.22 Mb
PubMed search
- Wikidata
View/Edit Human	View/Edit Mouse

Acyloxyacyl hydrolase, also known as AOAH, is a eukaryotic protein encoded by the AOAH gene. AOAH is produced by macrophages (including Kupffer cells and microglia), dendritic cells (especially in the colon), NK cells, ILC1 cells, neutrophils and renal proximal tubule cells.

== Species distribution ==
The AOAH gene has been found in many invertebrates and in all vertebrates studied to date except fish. Although mice have other well-established mechanisms for preventing LPS signaling, none of these has prevented long-term persistence of stimulatory LPS in animals that lack AOAH.

== Structure ==
The enzyme's 2 disulfide-linked subunits are encoded by a single mRNA. The smaller subunit is a member of the saposin-like (SAPLIP) protein family and the larger subunit, which contains the active site serine, is a GDSL lipase. The enzyme's 3D structure and catalytic mechanism were reported by Gorelik et al.

== Function ==
Acyloxyacyl hydrolase (AOAH) is a lipase that selectively releases the secondary (acyloxyacyl-linked) fatty acyl chains from the hexaacyl lipid A moiety found in many bacterial lipopolysaccharides (LPSs, also called endotoxins). The resulting tetraacyl LPS is non-stimulatory and can be a potent inhibitor of LPS sensing via the MD-2--Toll-like Receptor 4 (TLR4). The enzyme's other known substrates include bacterial lipopeptides and several host glycerolipids, including lyso-and oxidized phospholipids.

== Animal studies ==
Absence of the enzyme in genetically engineered mice has been associated with distinctive phenotypes. AOAH-deficient animals are unable to inactivate even small amounts of LPS in most tissues; the LPS remains bioactive and may pass from cell to cell in vivo for many weeks. The LPS-injected mice develop strikingly high titers of polyclonal antibodies, prolonged hepatomegaly, and innate immune "tolerance" that results in slow and inadequate responses to a bacterial challenge. Absence of the enzyme renders mice more likely to develop severe lung injury and die if they are challenged with intratracheal LPS, Gram-negative bacteria, or acid (AOAH may also inactivate oxidized phospholipids). Other studies have found that AOAH reduces the stimulatory potency of LPS that translocates from the gastrointestinal tract to the liver and other organs. AOAH may also prevent LPS-induced arterial foam cell formation in vivo.
