= 3-deoxy-D-manno-octulosonic acid kinase =

Class of enzymes

Identifiers
- EC no.: 2.7.1.166

Databases
- IntEnz: IntEnz view
- BRENDA: BRENDA entry
- ExPASy: NiceZyme view
- KEGG: KEGG entry
- MetaCyc: metabolic pathway
- PRIAM: profile
- PDB structures: RCSB PDB PDBe PDBsum
Search
- PMC: articles
- PubMed: articles
- NCBI: proteins

3-deoxy-D-manno-octulosonic acid kinase (EC 2.7.1.166, kdkA (gene), Kdo kinase) is an enzyme with systematic name ATP:(KDO)-lipid IVA 3-deoxy-alpha-D-manno-oct-2-ulopyranose 4-phosphotransferase. This enzyme catalyses the following chemical reaction

alpha-Kdo-(2->6)-lipid IVA + ATP $\rightleftharpoons$ 4-O-phospho-alpha-Kdo-(2->6)-lipid IVA + ADP

The enzyme phosphorylates the 4-OH position of KDO in (KDO)-lipid IVA.
