= 3-Deoxy-D-manno-oct-2-ulosonic acid =

3-Deoxy-d-manno-oct-2-ulosonic acid
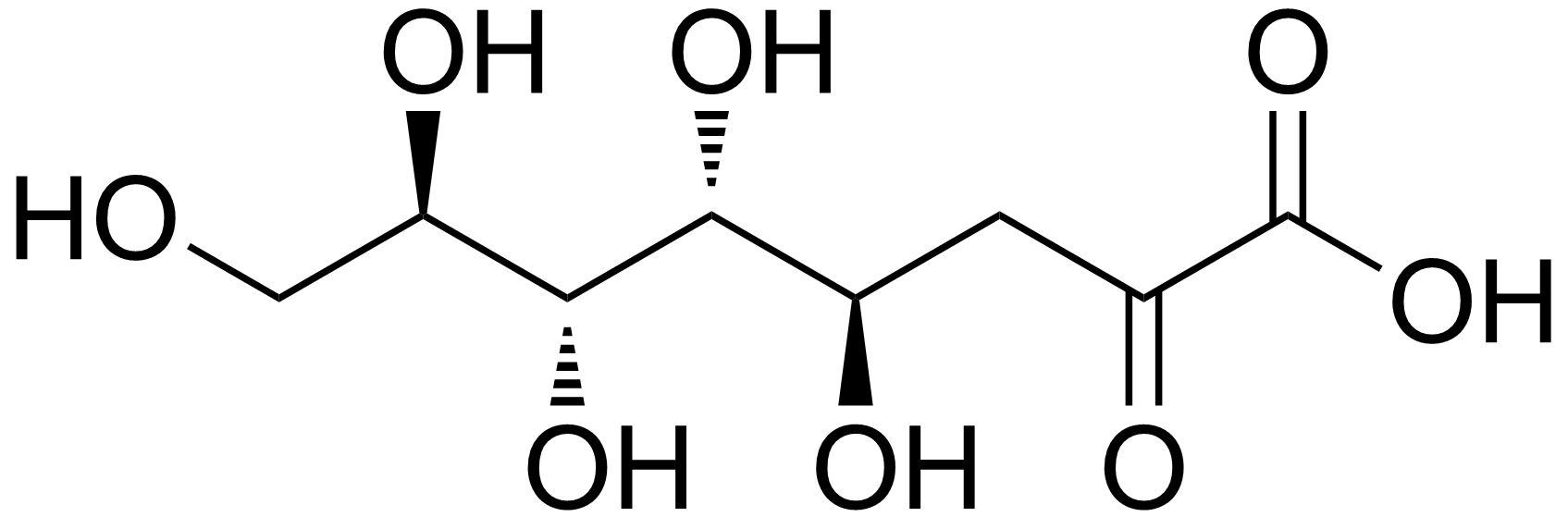

Names
- IUPAC name 3-Deoxy-D-manno-oct-2-ulosonic acid
- Systematic IUPAC name (4R,5R,6R,7R)-4,5,6,7,8-Pentahydroxy-2-oxooctanoic acid
- Other names 2-Oxo-3-deoxy-d-mannooctonic acid 2-Keto-3-Deoxy-d-manno-octonate; 2-Keto-3-deoxy-d-mannooctanoic acid 3-Deoxy-d-manno-2-octulosonic acid 3-Deoxy-d-manno-octulosonic acid

Identifiers
CAS Number	10149-14-1 (linear form)
3D model (JSmol)	Interactive image; Interactive image
Abbreviations	D-KDO; KDO; dOclA
ChEBI	CHEBI:32817
ChemSpider	106511
PubChem CID	445569
UNII	ZWK96OG89F (linear form)
CompTox Dashboard (EPA)	DTXSID501265068
- InChI: InChI=1S/C8H14O8/c9-2-5(12)7(14)6(13)3(10)1-4(11)8(15)16/h3,5-7,9-10,12-14H,1-2H2,(H,15,16)/t3-,5-,6-,7-/m1/s1 Key: KYQCXUMVJGMDNG-SHUUEZRQSA-N; InChI=1/C8H14O8/c9-2-5(12)7(14)6(13)3(10)1-4(11)8(15)16/h3,5-7,9-10,12-14H,1-2H2,(H,15,16)/t3-,5-,6-,7-/m1/s1 Key: KYQCXUMVJGMDNG-SHUUEZRQBC
- SMILES: O[C@@H]([C@@H]([C@@H](CC(C(O)=O)=O)O)O)[C@H](O)CO; O=C(O)C(=O)C[C@@H](O)[C@@H](O)[C@H](O)[C@H](O)CO

Properties
Chemical formula	C_{8}H_{14}O_{8}
Molar mass	238.192 g·mol^{−1}
- Except where otherwise noted, data are given for materials in their standard state (at 25 °C [77 °F], 100 kPa). verify (what is ?) Infobox references

3-Deoxy-d-manno-oct-2-ulosonic acid (ketodeoxyoctonic acid; KDO; IUPAC symbol Kdo) is a monosaccharide, specifically an ulosonic acid of a 2-ketooctose. In gram-negative bacteria it is a component of the core oligosaccharide portion of lipopolysaccharides, also known as endotoxin. The d-manno prefix indicates that the four chiral centers have the same configuration as d-mannose.

The cyclization of 3-deoxy-d-manno-oct-2-ulosonic acid to the β-anomer. The chiral centers are indicated by asterisks.
