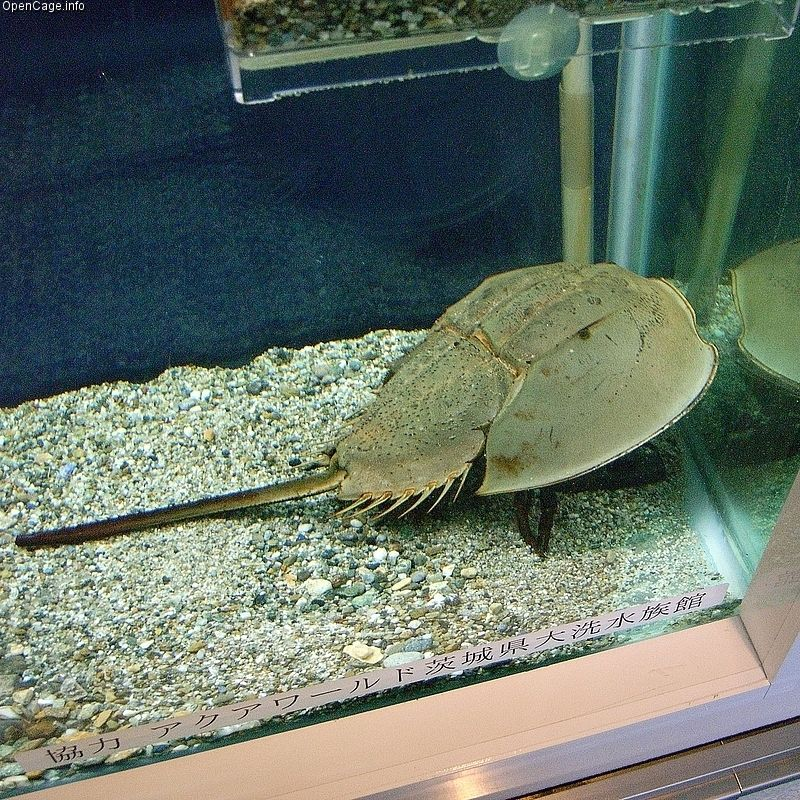
- Tachypleus tridentatus

Scientific classification
- Kingdom: Animalia
- Phylum: Arthropoda
- Subphylum: Chelicerata
- Order: Xiphosura
- Family: Limulidae
- Genus: Tachypleus (Leach, 1819)

Synonyms
- Heterolimulus Via Boada & Villalta, 1966

= Tachypleus =

Tachypleus Temporal range: Cenomanian–Present

Genus of horseshoe crab relatives

Tachypleus is a genus of south, southeast and east Asian horseshoe crabs in the family Limulidae.

== Species ==
There are two extant (living) species:

- Tachypleus gigas (Müller, 1785)
- Tachypleus tridentatus (Leach, 1819)

And two extinct species only known from fossil.

- Tachypleus decheni (Zinken, 1862) Upper Eocene Domsen Sands, Germany
- Tachypleus syriacus (Woodward, 1879) Upper Cretaceous (Cenomanian) Haqel and Hjoula Konservat-Lagerstatten, Lebanon
