= 2020 in arthropod paleontology =

2020 in arthropod paleontology is a list of new arthropod fossil taxa, including arachnids, crustaceans, insects, trilobites, and other arthropods that were announced or described, as well as other significant arthropod paleontological discoveries and events which occurred in 2020.

== Arachnids ==
=== Newly named taxa ===
Name	Novelty	Status	Authors	Age	Type locality	Country	Notes	Images
Aliendiguetia	Gen. et sp. nov	Valid	Wunderlich & Müller	Late Cretaceous (Cenomanian)	Burmese amber	Myanmar	A spider of uncertain phylogenetic placement, possibly related to the Ochyroceratoidea. The type species is A. praecursor.	
Bicornoculus granulans	Sp. nov	Valid	Wunderlich & Müller	Late Cretaceous (Cenomanian)	Burmese amber	Myanmar	A spider belonging to the family Tetrablemmidae.	
Biungulus	Gen. et sp. nov	In press	Bartel et al.	Late Cretaceous (Cenomanian)	Burmese amber	Myanmar	A member of Opiliones belonging to the family Epedanidae. Genus includes new species B. xiai.	
Burmacharon	Gen. et sp. nov	In press	Hu et al.	Late Cretaceous (Cenomanian)	Burmese amber	Myanmar	A whip spider. Genus includes new species B. dunlopi.	
Burmesarchaea bilongapophyses	Sp. nov	Valid	Wunderlich & Müller	Late Cretaceous (Cenomanian)	Burmese amber	Myanmar	A spider belonging to the family Archaeidae.	
Burmesia	Gen. et sp. nov	Junior homonym	Wunderlich & Müller	Late Cretaceous (Cenomanian)	Burmese amber	Myanmar	A spider belonging to family Nemesiidae. The type species is B. sordida. The generic name is preoccupied by Burmesia Healey (1908); Wunderlich (2021) coined a replacement name Burmesiana.	
?Burmesiola kachinensis	Sp. nov	Valid	Wunderlich & Müller	Late Cretaceous (Cenomanian)	Burmese amber	Myanmar	A tree trunk spider.	
Burmorchestina circular	Sp. nov	Valid	Wunderlich & Müller	Late Cretaceous (Cenomanian)	Burmese amber	Myanmar	A spider belonging to the family Oonopidae.	
Burmorchestina prominens	Sp. nov	Valid	Wunderlich & Müller	Late Cretaceous (Cenomanian)	Burmese amber	Myanmar	A spider belonging to the family Oonopidae.	
Burmorsolus globosus	Sp. nov	Valid	Wunderlich & Müller	Late Cretaceous (Cenomanian)	Burmese amber	Myanmar	A spider, probably related to trogloraptorids.	
Burmorsolus longembolus	Sp. nov	Valid	Wunderlich & Müller	Late Cretaceous (Cenomanian)	Burmese amber	Myanmar	A spider, probably related to trogloraptorids.	
Burmorsolus longibulbus	Sp. nov	Valid	Wunderlich & Müller	Late Cretaceous (Cenomanian)	Burmese amber	Myanmar	A spider, probably related to trogloraptorids.	
Chaeriloiurus	Gen. et sp. nov	Disputed	Lourenço in Lourenço & Velten	Cretaceous	Burmese amber	Myanmar	A scorpion belonging to the family Chaerilobuthidae or Pseudochactidae. Genus includes new species C. brigittemuellerae. Xuan et al. (2025) considered the genus Chaeriloiurus to be a junior synonym of the genus Chaerilobuthus, though the authors maintained C. brigittemuellerae as a distinct species within the latter genus.	
Chaeriloscorpiops	Gen. et sp. nov	Valid	Lourenço in Lourenço & Velten	Cretaceous	Burmese amber	Myanmar	A scorpion belonging to the family Palaeoeuscorpiidae. Genus includes new species C. bautschi.	
Consteniusi	Gen. et sp. nov	Valid	Downen & Selden	Eocene	Kishenehn Formation	United States	An orb-weaver spider. The type species is C. leonae.	
Curculioides bohemondi	Sp. nov	Valid	Whalen & Selden	Carboniferous (Pennsylvanian)	Energy Shale	United States	A member of Ricinulei, and the largest known species within that order.	
Cymbioblemma fusca	Sp. nov	Valid	Wunderlich & Müller	Late Cretaceous (Cenomanian)	Burmese amber	Myanmar	A spider belonging to the family Tetrablemmidae.	
Cymbioblemma hamoembolus	Sp. nov	Valid	Wunderlich & Müller	Late Cretaceous (Cenomanian)	Burmese amber	Myanmar	A spider belonging to the family Tetrablemmidae.	
Electroblemma bifurcata	Sp. nov	Valid	Wunderlich & Müller	Late Cretaceous (Cenomanian)	Burmese amber	Myanmar	A spider belonging to the family Tetrablemmidae.	
Electroblemma caula	Sp. nov	Valid	Wunderlich & Müller	Late Cretaceous (Cenomanian)	Burmese amber	Myanmar	A spider belonging to the family Tetrablemmidae.	
Electroblemma pinnae	Sp. nov	Valid	Wunderlich & Müller	Late Cretaceous (Cenomanian)	Burmese amber	Myanmar	A spider belonging to the family Tetrablemmidae.	
Ellenbergellus	Gen. et sp. nov	In press	Bartel et al.	Late Cretaceous (Cenomanian)	Burmese amber	Myanmar	A member of Opiliones belonging to the family Tithaeidae. Genus includes new species E. tuberculatus.	
Eogamasomorpha rostratis	Sp. nov	Valid	Wunderlich & Müller	Late Cretaceous (Cenomanian)	Burmese amber	Myanmar	A spider belonging to the family Tetrablemmidae.	
Epieremulus sidorchukae	Sp. nov	In press	Arillo, Subías & Peñalver	Cretaceous	Asturian amber	Spain	A mite belonging to the group Oribatida and to the family Caleremaeidae	
Gigantocheles	Gen. et sp. nov	In press	Bartel et al.	Late Cretaceous (Cenomanian)	Burmese amber	Myanmar	A member of Opiliones belonging to the family Epedanidae. Genus includes new species G. nilsi.	
Gigarachne	Gen. et sp. nov	Valid	Jiang & Li in Jiang et al.	Late Cretaceous	Burmese amber	Myanmar	A spider belonging to the group Araneomorphae and to the new family Gigarachnidae. The type species is G. bian.	
Greenwaltarachne	Gen. et sp. nov	Valid	Downen & Selden	Eocene	Kishenehn Formation	United States	An orb-weaver spider. The type species is G. pamelae.	
Hamoderces	Gen. et sp. nov	Valid	Wunderlich & Müller	Late Cretaceous (Cenomanian)	Burmese amber	Myanmar	A spider belonging to the superfamily Scytodoidea and the family Praepholcidae. The type species is H. opilionoides.	
Magnosegestria	Gen. et sp. nov	Valid	Wunderlich & Müller	Late Cretaceous (Cenomanian)	Burmese amber	Myanmar	Probably a tube-dwelling spider. The type species is M. tuber.	
Mesokanus	Gen. et sp. nov	In press	Bartel et al.	Late Cretaceous (Cenomanian)	Burmese amber	Myanmar	A member of Opiliones belonging to the group Laniatores and to the new family Mesokanidae. Genus includes new species M. oehmkuehnlei.	
Mesozomus	Gen. et sp. nov	Valid	Müller et al.	Late Cretaceous (Cenomanian)	Burmese amber	Myanmar	A member of Schizomida. Genus includes new species M. groehni.	
Modisimus chiapanecus	Sp. nov	In press	García-Villafuerte & Valdez-Mondragón	Miocene (Aquitanian)	Mexican amber	Mexico	A species of Modisimus	
Myannemesia	Gen. et sp. nov	Valid	Wunderlich & Müller	Late Cretaceous (Cenomanian)	Burmese amber	Myanmar	A spider belonging to family Nemesiidae. The type species is M. glaber.	
Myrmecarchaea antecessor	Sp. nov		Carbuccia et al.	Eocene (Ypresian)	Oise amber	France	A member of the family Archaeidae.	
Neophyllobius electrus	Sp. nov	Valid	Zmudzinski	Eocene	Baltic amber	Europe (Baltic Sea region)	A mite, a species of Neophyllobius.	
Neophyllobius glaesus	Sp. nov	Valid	Zmudzinski	Eocene	Baltic amber	Europe (Baltic Sea region)	A mite, a species of Neophyllobius.	
Odontomegops	Gen. et sp. nov	Valid	Guo et al.	Late Cretaceous (Cenomanian)	Burmese amber	Myanmar	A spider belonging to the family Lagonomegopidae. Genus includes new species O. titan.	
Odontoscirus cretacico	Sp. nov	Valid	Porta et al.	Late Cretaceous (Cenomanian)	Burmese amber	Myanmar	A mite belonging to the family Bdellidae.	
Palaeobeloniscus	Gen. et sp. nov	In press	Bartel et al.	Late Cretaceous (Cenomanian)	Burmese amber	Myanmar	A member of Opiliones belonging to the family Beloniscidae. Genus includes new species P. thilolebi.	
Palazarqaraneus	Gen. et sp. nov	Valid	Wunderlich & Müller	Late Cretaceous (Cenomanian)	Burmese amber	Myanmar	A spider belonging to family Zarqaraneidae. The type species is P. hamulus.	
Parvocteniza	Gen. et sp. nov	Valid	Wunderlich & Müller	Late Cretaceous (Cenomanian)	Burmese amber	Myanmar	A spider belonging to family Ctenizidae. The type species is P. parvula.	
Paurospina fastigata	Sp. nov	Valid	Wunderlich & Müller	Late Cretaceous (Cenomanian)	Burmese amber	Myanmar	A spider belonging to family Zarqaraneidae.	
Pilosarachne	Gen. et sp. nov	Valid	Jiang & Li in Jiang et al.	Late Cretaceous	Burmese amber	Myanmar	A spider belonging to the group Araneomorphae and to the new family Pilosarachnidae. The type species is P. ju.	
Praearaneus araneoides	Sp. nov	Valid	Wunderlich & Müller	Late Cretaceous (Cenomanian)	Burmese amber	Myanmar	A spider belonging to the family Praearaneidae.	
Priscaleclercera furcata	Sp. nov	Valid	Wunderlich & Müller	Late Cretaceous (Cenomanian)	Burmese amber	Myanmar	A spider belonging to the family Psilodercidae.	
Priscaleclercera hamo	Sp. nov	Valid	Wunderlich & Müller	Late Cretaceous (Cenomanian)	Burmese amber	Myanmar	A spider belonging to the family Psilodercidae.	
Priscaleclercera liber	Sp. nov	Valid	Wunderlich & Müller	Late Cretaceous (Cenomanian)	Burmese amber	Myanmar	A spider belonging to the family Psilodercidae.	
Procheiridium	Gen. et sp. nov	Valid	Porta et al.	Late Cretaceous (Cenomanian)	Burmese amber	Myanmar	A pseudoscorpion belonging to the family Cheiridiidae and the subfamily Pycnocheiridiinae. Genus includes new species P. judsoni.	
Propterpsiloderces crassitibia	Sp. nov	Valid	Wunderlich & Müller	Late Cretaceous (Cenomanian)	Burmese amber	Myanmar	A spider belonging to the family Eopsilodercidae.	
Propterpsiloderces cymbioseta	Sp. nov	Valid	Wunderlich & Müller	Late Cretaceous (Cenomanian)	Burmese amber	Myanmar	A spider belonging to the family Eopsilodercidae.	
Propterpsiloderces duplex	Sp. nov	Valid	Wunderlich & Müller	Late Cretaceous (Cenomanian)	Burmese amber	Myanmar	A spider belonging to the family Eopsilodercidae.	
Protertheraphosa	Gen. et sp. nov	Valid	Wunderlich & Müller	Late Cretaceous (Cenomanian)	Burmese amber	Myanmar	A tarantula. The type species is P. spinipes.	
Protopyramidops	Gen. et sp. nov	In press	Bartel et al.	Late Cretaceous (Cenomanian)	Burmese amber	Myanmar	A member of Opiliones, possibly belonging to the family Pyramidopidae. Genus includes new species P. nalae.	
Spinicreber vacuus	Sp. nov	Valid	Wunderlich & Müller	Late Cretaceous (Cenomanian)	Burmese amber	Myanmar	A spider belonging to the family Pholcochyroceridae.	
Suraju	Gen. et sp. nov	In press	Martine et al.	Permian (Guadalupian)	Teresina Formation	Brazil	A scorpion. Genus includes new species S. itayma.	
Unicornutiblemma	Gen. et 3 sp. et comb. nov	Valid	Wunderlich & Müller	Late Cretaceous (Cenomanian)	Burmese amber	Myanmar	A spider belonging to the family Tetrablemmidae. The type species is U. gracilicornis; genus also includes new species U. brevicornis and U. longicornis, as well as "Eogamasomorpha" unicornis Wunderlich (2017).	

== Crustaceans ==
=== Newly named taxa ===
==== Malacostracans ====
Name	Novelty	Status	Authors	Age	Type locality	Country	Notes	Images
Aliaplax	Gen. et sp. nov	Valid	Pasini et al.	Early Pleistocene		Italy	A member of the family Goneplacidae. The type species is A. tyrsenorum.	
Ammopylocheles romankijoki	Sp. nov	Valid	Fraaije et al.	Early Cretaceous (Berriasian)		Czech Republic	A hermit crab belonging to the family Pylochelidae.	
Amphoranina	Gen. et 2 sp. nov	Valid	Nyborg et al.	Eocene to Oligocene		Canada; United States	A crab belonging to the family Raninidae. Genus includes new species A. blandi and A. multispinata.	
Ancipitecancer	Gen. et sp. nov	Valid	Pasini, Luque & Garassino	Pleistocene		Italy	A member of Xanthoidea sensu lato, of uncertain phylogenetic placement within that group. Genus includes new species A. collinsi.	
Angusteryon	Gen. et sp. nov	Valid	Audo & Furrer	Early Jurassic		Switzerland	A member of Polychelida, possibly belonging to the family Coleiidae. Genus includes new species A. oberlii.	
Annuntidiogenes sagittula	Sp. nov	Valid	Fraaije et al.	Early Cretaceous (Berriasian)		Czech Republic	A hermit crab belonging to the family Annuntidiogenidae.	
Bournelyreidus shiranui	Sp. nov	Valid	Ando in Ando et al.	Late Cretaceous (Cenomanian)	Enokuchi Formation	Japan	A lyreidid raninoid crab.	
Braggitrapezia	Gen. et sp. nov	Valid	De Angeli & Caporiondo	Eocene		Italy	A crab belonging to the group Trapezioidea. Genus includes new species B. alessandroi.	
Caecorchestia	Gen. et sp. nov	Valid	Hegna & Lazo-Wasem in Hegna et al.	Early Miocene	Mexican amber	Mexico	A member of Amphipoda belonging to the family Talitridae. Genus includes new species C. bousfieldi.	
Calappilia erwinhartei	Sp. nov	Valid	Wallaard et al.	Miocene (Burdigalian)		Portugal	A species of Calappilia.	
Callianassa reinhardpalorum	Sp. nov	Valid	Hyžný	Miocene		Hungary; Poland; Slovakia	A species of Callianassa.	
Calliax nishiki	Sp. nov	Valid	Ando et al.	Latest Pleistocene to Holocene	Moeshima Silt Bed	Japan	A member of Axiidea belonging to the family Eucalliacidae.	
Callichirus santensis	Sp. nov	In press	Hernáez, Buchmann & Santana	Late Pleistocene		Brazil	A species of Callichirus.	
Cancer nancei	Sp. nov	Valid	Bahman, Feldmann & Schweitzer	Miocene	St. Marys	United States	A species of Cancer	
Cancer zahrae	Sp. nov	Valid	Bahman, Feldmann & Schweitzer	Miocene	St. Marys	United States	A species of Cancer	
Cherpihomola	Gen. et sp. nov	Valid	Marangon & De Angeli	Oligocene (Rupelian)		Italy	A member of the family Homolidae. The type species is C. italica.	
Collinscarcinus	Gen. et sp. nov	Valid	Artal & van Bakel	Eocene (Ypresian)		Spain	A crab belonging to the family Xanthidae. Genus includes new species C. obliquesulcatus.	
Cretacalliax	Gen. et sp. nov	Valid	Pasini, Poore & Garassino	Late Cretaceous (Cenomanian)		Lebanon	A ghost shrimp belonging to the family Callianopsidae. Genus includes new species C. levantina.	
Cuchiadromites	Gen. et sp. nov	In press	Ossó, van Bakel & Ferratges	Early Cretaceous (Aptian)	Patrocinio Formation	Spain	A crab belonging to the family Longodromitidae. Genus includes new species C. jadeae.	
Daira corallina	Sp. nov	Valid	Ferratges, Zamora & Aurell	Late Eocene		Spain		
Dardanus cherpionensis	Sp. nov	Valid	Marangon & De Angeli	Oligocene (Rupelian)	Ligure-Piemontese Basin	Italy	A species of Dardanus.	
Dardanus faxensis	Sp. nov	Valid	Jakobsen et al.	Paleocene (Danian)	Faxe Formation	Denmark	A species of Dardanus.	
Diogenes augustinus	Sp. nov	Valid	Ferratges, Zamora & Aurell	Eocene (Bartonian)	Arguis Formation	Spain	A hermit crab, a species of Diogenes.	
Discosalaputium	Gen. et sp. nov	Valid	Schädel et al.	Late Triassic (Carnian)	Reingraben	Austria	A member of Isopoda belonging to the group Scutocoxifera. The type species is D. aschauerorum.	
Dynomene collinsi	Sp. nov	Valid	Ossó et al.	Eocene (Priabonian)		Spain	A crab belonging to the family Dynomenidae.	
Eodromites bernchrisdomiorum	Sp. nov	Valid	Klompmaker et al.	Late Jurassic (Oxfordian)		Poland	A crab belonging to the family Goniodromitidae.	
Eodromites cristinarobinsae	Sp. nov	Valid	Klompmaker et al.	Early Cretaceous (Albian)	Eguino Formation	Spain	A crab belonging to the family Goniodromitidae.	
Eopolycheles	Gen. et sp. nov	Valid	Gašparič et al.	Late Triassic (Carnian)		Slovenia	A member of the family Polychelidae. Genus includes new species E. cornuaureus.	
Eryma moriedaorum	Sp. nov	Valid	Ando et al.	Late Cretaceous (Cenomanian)	Enokuchi Formation	Japan	A member of the family Erymidae.	
Etyus tresgalloi	Sp. nov	Valid	Ossó & Moreno-Bedmar	Early Cretaceous (Aptian)		Spain	A crab belonging to the family Etyiidae.	
Eupilumnus? vokesae	Sp. nov	In press	Luque in Luque et al.	Miocene		Mexico	A crab.	
Europrosopon	Gen. et comb. nov	Valid	Klompmaker et al.	Late Jurassic		Austria; Czech Republic; Germany; Romania	A crab belonging to the family Prosopidae. The type species is "Prosopon" aculeatum von Meyer (1857); genus also includes "Prosopon" abbreviatum Schweitzer & Feldmann (2009).	
Galathea tuscia	Sp. nov	Valid	Pasini et al.	Early Pleistocene		Italy	A species of Galathea.	
Gammaroidorum	Gen. et sp. nov	In press	Jarzembowski et al.	Early Cretaceous (Hauterivian)	Weald	United Kingdom	A member of Amphipoda. Genus includes new species G. vonki.	
Gelrincola	Gen. et sp. nov	Valid	Schädel et al.	Middle Triassic (Anisian)	Lower Muschelkalk Vossenveld Formation	Netherlands	A member of Isopoda belonging to the group Cymothoida. The type species is G. winterswijkensis.	
Gemmellarocarcinus riglosensis	Sp. nov	Valid	Ferratges, Zamora & Aurell	Late Eocene		Spain		
Glebocarcinus doii	Sp. nov	Valid	Karasawa & Takahashi	Early Miocene	Igami	Japan	A member of the family Cancridae	
Graptocarcinus collinsi	Sp. nov	Valid	Vega in Vega et al.	Late Cretaceous (Maastrichtian)	Arroyo Grande Formation	Cuba	A crab belonging to the family Dynomenidae.	
Hefriga schlechtingerae	Sp. nov	Valid	Winkler	Late Jurassic (Tithonian)	Solnhofen	Germany	A caridean shrimp	
Hispanigalathea raymondcaseyi	Sp. nov	Valid	Van Bakel et al.	Early Cretaceous (Albian)	Gault	United Kingdom	A member of Galatheoidea.	
Hoploparia echinata	Sp. nov	Valid	Pinheiro et al.	Late Cretaceous (Santonian–Campanian)	Santa Marta Formation	Antarctica		
Hoploparia hinokunika	Sp. nov	Valid	Ando & Shimada in Ando et al.	Late Cretaceous (Cenomanian)	Enokuchi Formation; Karakizaki Formation	Japan	A lobster.	
Hoploparia tectumque	Sp. nov	In press	Fraaije et al.	Late Cretaceous (Cenomanian)		Kazakhstan		
Icriobranchiocarcinus rodas	Sp. nov	In press	Vega in Vega et al.	Late Cretaceous (Maastrichtian)	Arroyo Grande Formation	Cuba	A crab belonging to group Portunoidea and the family Lithophylacidae. Announced in 2020; the final version of the article naming it is scheduled to be published in 2021.	
Joecalcinus	Gen. et sp. nov	Valid	Fraaije et al.	Eocene		Italy	A hermit crab belonging to the family Calcinidae. Genus includes new species J. bolcensis.	
Juranecrocarcinus	Gen. et comb. nov	In press	Van Bakel et al.	Late Jurassic (Kimmeridgian)		Germany	A crab belonging to the family Necrocarcinidae. The type species is "Nodoprosopon" angulosum Wehner (1988).	
Laeviprosopon musialiki	Sp. nov	Valid	Starzyk	Late Jurassic (Oxfordian)		Poland	A crab belonging to the family Prosopidae.	
Levashidromites	Gen. et sp. nov	In press	Van Bakel et al.	Early Cretaceous (Aptian)	Kubina Formation	Russia	A crab belonging to the family Longodromitidae. The type species is L. cornutus.	
Lobogalenopsis joei	Sp. nov	Valid	Ferratges, Zamora & Aurell	Late Eocene		Spain		
Mariaplax ohiranorikoae	Sp. nov	Valid	Karasawa and Kobayashi	Pleistocene	Atsumi Group	Japan	A member of the family Hexapodidae.	
Marmacuma	Gen. et sp. nov	Valid	Artüz & Sakınç	Late Pleistocene		Turkey	A member of Cumacea belonging to the family Nannastacidae. Genus includes new species M. samimei.	
Masticacheles septemgradu	Sp. nov	Valid	Fraaije et al.	Late Jurassic (Tithonian)		Czech Republic	A hermit crab belonging to the family Pilgrimchelidae.	
Matutites collinsi	Sp. nov	Valid	Davis, Garassino & Weaver	Middle Eocene	Castle Hayne	United States	A member of the family Matutidae.	
Maurocarpilius	Gen. et sp. nov	Valid	Ossó, Gagnaison & Bailleul	Eocene (Ypresian)	Ait Ouarhitane	Morocco	A member of the family Carpiliidae. The type species is M. binodosus.	
Mesogalathea ardua	Sp. nov	Valid	Gašparič, Robins & Gale	Late Jurassic (Kimmeridgian/Tithonian)		Slovenia	A member of the family Galatheidae.	
Mesoparapylocheles janetjacksonae	Sp. nov	Valid	Fraaije et al.	Late Jurassic (Tithonian)		Czech Republic	A hermit crab belonging to the family Parapylochelidae.	
Mizuhocancer	Gen. et comb. nov	Valid	Karasawa in Karasawa & Takahashi	Early—Middle Miocene		Japan	A member of the family Cancridae. Monotypic with the type species, Cancer? Imamurae Imaizumi, 1962.	
Montemagrecarcinus	Gen. et sp. nov	Valid	De Angeli & Ceccon	Early Eocene		Italy	A crab belonging to the family Pilumnidae. Genus includes new species M. efremi.	
Moravacarcinus	Gen. et sp. nov	In press	Van Bakel et al.	Early Cretaceous (Berriasian)	Štramberk Limestone	Czech Republic	A crab belonging to the family Necrocarcinidae. The type species is M. stramberkensis.	
Munidopsis kaedetatsuyai	Sp. nov	Valid	Karasawa	Miocene	Higashibessho Formation	Japan	A member of the family Munidopsidae.	
Neoliomera zovoensis	Sp. nov	Valid	De Angeli & Garassino	Early Eocene		Italy	A species of Neoliomera.	
Nitotacarcinus ambrosii	Sp. nov	Valid	Beschin & Checchi	Eocene (Ypresian)		Italy	A crab belonging to the superfamily Carpilioidea and the family Tumidocarcinidae.	
Obtusotelson	Gen. et sp. nov	Valid	Schädel et al.	Late Triassic (Carnian)	Reingraben	Austria	A member of Isopoda belonging to the group Scutocoxifera. The type species is O. summesbergeri.	
Orithyia eikii	Sp. nov	Valid	Karasawa	Early Miocene	Mizunami Group	Japan	A member of the family Orithyiidae.	
Paguristes collinsi	Sp. nov	Valid	Marangon & De Angeli	Oligocene (Rupelian)	Ligure-Piemontese Basin	Italy	A species of Paguristes.	
Paguristes frigoscopulus	Sp. nov	Valid	Jakobsen et al.	Paleocene (Danian)	Faxe Formation	Denmark	A species of Paguristes.	
Paguristes joecollinsi	Sp. nov	Valid	Wallaard et al.	Miocene (Tortonian)	Pakhna Formation	Cyprus	A species of Paguristes.	
Paguristes laurae	Sp. nov	Valid	Marangon & De Angeli	Oligocene (Rupelian)	Ligure-Piemontese Basin	Italy	A species of Paguristes.	
Palaeopalinurellus	Gen. et 2 sp. et comb. nov	Valid	Fraaije et al.	Late Jurassic to Late Cretaceous (Cenomanian)		Czech Republic; France; Lebanon	A furry lobster. Genus includes new species P. culocervus and P. jbeilensis, as well as "Palinurus" strambergensis Bachmayer (1959).	
Palaeopolycheles nantosueltae	Sp. nov		Jauvion et al.	Middle Jurassic (Callovian)	La Voulte-sur-Rhône	France	A member of Polychelida	
Personadorippe	Gen. et 2 sp. et comb. nov	In press	Van Bakel et al.	Cretaceous (Aptian to Cenomanian)	Hudspeth Formation; Kubina Formation; Lyaminsk Formation	Russia; United States	A crab belonging to the superfamily Dorippoidea and the family Telamonocarcinidae. The type species is P. kalashnikovi; genus also includes new species P. levashiensis, as well as "Eodorippe" connori Nyborg et al. (2019).	
Petrolisthes landsendi	Sp. nov	Valid	Garassino & Nyborg in Garassino et al.	Late Cretaceous (Santonian)	Nanaimo Group	Canada	A species of Petrolisthes.	
?Proeryon erinaceus	Sp. nov	Valid	Audo, Schweigert & Charbonnier	Late Jurassic (Oxfordian)	Terrain à Chailles Formation	France		
?Proeryon quiltyi	Sp. nov	Valid	Audo, Schweigert & Charbonnier	Middle Jurassic (Callovian)		Antarctica		
Prosopon josephcollinsi	Sp. nov	Valid	Klompmaker et al.	Late Jurassic (Tithonian)	Ernstbrunn Limestone	Austria	A crab belonging to the family Prosopidae.	
Protoapseudoides	Fam. et Gen. et sp. nov	In press	Heard et al.	Early Cretaceous (Aptian)	Sierra Madre	Mexico	A member of Tanaidacea belonging to the group Apseudomorpha, in the new family Protoapseudoidae. Genus includes new species P. espinalensis.	
Protopagurus cerebellum	Sp. nov	Valid	Fraaije et al.	Early Cretaceous (Berriasian)		Czech Republic	A hermit crab belonging to the family Paguridae.	
Protopagurus duopupae	Sp. nov	Valid	Fraaije et al.	Early Cretaceous (Berriasian)		Czech Republic	A hermit crab belonging to the family Paguridae.	
Pseudastacus lemovices	Sp. nov	Valid	Charbonnier & Audo	Early Jurassic (Sinemurian)		France	A member of Astacidea belonging to the family Stenochiridae	
Sabellidromites lanae	Sp. nov	Valid	Nyborg, Garassino & Ross	Late Cretaceous (late Campanian)		Canada	A dromioid crab	
Stenodactylina beardi	Sp. nov	Valid	Feldmann, Schweitzer & Haggart	Late Cretaceous	Haslam	Canada	A member of the family Erymidae.	
Stenodactylina devillezi	Sp. nov	Valid	Schweigert & Härer	Late Jurassic (Kimmeridgian)	Nusplingen	Germany	A member of the family Erymidae.	
Stenodactylina geigerae	Sp. nov	Valid	Schweigert & Härer	Late Jurassic (Tithonian)	Usseltal	Germany	A member of the family Erymidae.	
Stonesfielderyon	Gen. et sp. nov	Valid	Audo, Schweigert & Charbonnier	Middle Jurassic (Bathonian)		United Kingdom	A possible member of the family Eryonidae. The type species is S. imitator.	
Tanidromites nightwishorum	Sp. nov	Valid	Klompmaker et al.	Late Jurassic (Tithonian)	Ernstbrunn Limestone	Austria	A crab belonging to the family Tanidromitidae.	
Tanidromites weinschenki	Sp. nov	Valid	Klompmaker et al.	Late Jurassic (Kimmeridgian)	Oberjura-Massenkalk Formation	Germany	A crab belonging to the family Tanidromitidae.	
Tymolus bottemilleri	Sp. nov	Valid	Nyborg & Garassino	Miocene	Astoria	United States	A crab belonging to the family Cyclodorippidae.	
Tymolus collinsi	Sp. nov	Valid	Nyborg & Garassino	Miocene		United States	A crab belonging to the family Cyclodorippidae.	
Upogebia azorensis	Sp. nov	Valid	Hyžný in Hyžný et al.	Pliocene		Azores	A species of Upogebia. Announced in 2020; the final version of the article naming it was published in 2021.	
Vecticallichirus kawanoi	Sp. nov	Valid	Ando	Late Eocene	Funazu	Japan	A ghost shrimp belonging to the family Callichiridae.	
Vectis collinsi	Sp. nov	In press	Van Bakel et al.	Early Cretaceous (Aptian)	Kubina Formation	Russia	A crab belonging to the family Viaiidae.	

==== Ostracods ====
Name	Novelty	Status	Authors	Age	Type locality	Country	Notes	Images
Adelphobolbina praeclara	Sp. nov	Valid	Becker, Braun & Pratt	Devonian		Canada		
Ampuloides beckeri	Sp. nov	Valid	Nazik et al.	Late Devonian		Mongolia	A member of Podocopida belonging to the superfamily Bairdiocypridoidea and the family Pachydomellidae.	
Angarallina	Gen. et 2 sp. nov	Valid	Melnikova	Ordovician		Russia	Genus includes new species A. demissa and A. aenigma.	
Araxobairdia	Gen. et sp. nov	Valid	Gliwa in Gliwa et al.	Permian (Changhsingian)		Iran	A member of Podocopida belonging to the family Bairdiidae. The type species is A. formosa.	
Bairdia andrecrasquini	Sp. nov		Crasquin et al.	Late Triassic		Italy	A member of the family Bairdiidae.	
Bairdia gambaneraensis	Sp. nov		Crasquin et al.	Late Triassic		Italy	A member of the family Bairdiidae.	
Bairdia paramolesta	Sp. nov	Valid	Cabral, Lord & Pinto in Cabral et al.	Early Jurassic (Pliensbachian and Toarcian)		Portugal	A member of the family Bairdiidae.	
Bairdiacypris argonautaii	Sp. nov	Valid	Forel in Forel & Grădinaru	Late Triassic (Rhaetian)	Kössen Formation	Austria; Romania	A member of Podocopida belonging to the family Bairdiidae.	
Bairdiacypris kathleenae	Sp. nov	Valid	Gliwa in Gliwa et al.	Late Permian and Early Triassic (Changhsingian–Griesbachian)		Iran	A member of Podocopida belonging to the family Bairdiidae.	
Beyrichiopsis hushootensis	Sp. nov	Valid	Nazik et al.	Late Devonian		Mongolia	A member of Platycopida belonging to the superfamily Kloedenelloidea and the family Beyrichiopsidae.	
Bythocypris dorsogibba	Sp. nov	In press	Trabelsi et al.	Early Cretaceous (Albian)	Orbata	Tunisia		
Bythocypris? multagracilis	Sp. nov	In press	Trabelsi et al.	Early Cretaceous (Albian)	Orbata	Tunisia		
Bythocypris? pythagorasi	Sp. nov	In press	Trabelsi et al.	Early Cretaceous (Aptian)	Orbata	Tunisia		
Candonopsis carthaginensis	Sp. nov	In press	Trabelsi et al.	Early Cretaceous (Albian)	Orbata	Tunisia		
Capsacythere baldanzae	Sp. nov	In press	Sciuto & Temani in Sciuto, Temani & Ammar	Miocene (Messinian)		Tunisia	A member of Podocopa belonging to the family Trachyleberididae.	
Capsacythere fekihi	Sp. nov	In press	Sciuto & Temani in Sciuto, Temani & Ammar	Miocene (Messinian)		Tunisia	A member of Podocopa belonging to the family Trachyleberididae.	
Capsacythere giovannae	Sp. nov	In press	Sciuto & Temani in Sciuto, Temani & Ammar	Miocene (Messinian)		Tunisia	A member of Podocopa belonging to the family Trachyleberididae.	
Capsacythere salaji	Sp. nov	In press	Sciuto & Temani in Sciuto, Temani & Ammar	Miocene (Messinian)		Tunisia	A member of Podocopa belonging to the family Trachyleberididae.	
Carinaknightina hofmanni	Sp. nov	Valid	Gliwa in Gliwa et al.	Permian (Changhsingian)		Iran	A member of Palaeocopida belonging to the family Kirkbyidae.	
Cavellina fosteri	Sp. nov	Valid	Gliwa in Gliwa et al.	Permian (Changhsingian)		Iran	A member of Platycopida belonging to the family Cavellinidae.	
Cavellina hairapetiani	Sp. nov	Valid	Gliwa in Gliwa et al.	Permian (Changhsingian)		Iran	A member of Platycopida belonging to the family Cavellinidae.	
Ceratobairdia? akhilleus	Sp. nov	Valid	Forel in Forel & Grădinaru	Late Triassic (Rhaetian)		Romania	A member of Podocopida belonging to the family Bairdiidae.	
Chrysocythere arutai	Sp. nov	In press	Sciuto & Temani in Sciuto, Temani & Ammar	Miocene (Messinian)		Tunisia	A member of Podocopa belonging to the family Trachyleberididae.	
Chrysocythere gliozziae	Sp. nov	In press	Sciuto & Temani in Sciuto, Temani & Ammar	Miocene (Messinian)		Tunisia	A member of Podocopa belonging to the family Trachyleberididae.	
Chrysocythere russoi	Sp. nov	In press	Sciuto & Temani in Sciuto, Temani & Ammar	Miocene (Messinian)		Tunisia	A member of Podocopa belonging to the family Trachyleberididae.	
Cimbaurila maamourii	Sp. nov	In press	Sciuto & Temani in Sciuto, Temani & Ammar	Miocene (Messinian)		Tunisia	A member of Podocopa belonging to the family Hemicytheridae.	
Costa ponticulocarinata	Sp. nov	Valid	Yasuhara et al.	Early Miocene		India		
Costoprimites multicostatus	Sp. nov	Valid	Gonta	Ordovician		Russia		
Costoprimites processus	Sp. nov	Valid	Gonta	Ordovician		Russia		
Cypridea punctacentralis	Sp. nov	In press	Santos Filho, Fauth & Sames	Early Cretaceous	Orós Formation	Brazil		
Cytherella ilariae	Sp. nov	In press	Sciuto & Temani in Sciuto, Temani & Ammar	Miocene (Messinian)		Tunisia	A species of Cytherella.	
Cytheretta mariaantoniettae	Sp. nov	In press	Sciuto & Temani in Sciuto, Temani & Ammar	Miocene (Messinian)		Tunisia	A member of Podocopa belonging to the family Cytherettidae.	
Dicerobairdia buseri	Sp. nov	Valid	Forel in Forel, Kolar-Jurkovšek & Jurkovšek	Late Triassic (Carnian)		Slovenia	A member of Podocopida belonging to the family Bairdiidae.	
Direigina	Gen. et sp. nov	Valid	Melnikova	Ordovician		Russia	Genus includes new species D. nana.	
Disulcina proxima	Sp. nov	Valid	Melnikova	Ordovician		Russia	A member of the family Tetradellidae.	
Dolocythere amphistiela	Sp. nov	Valid	Lord, Cabral & Danielopol	Early Cretaceous (Albian)		Germany	A member of Podocopida belonging to the family Cytheridae	
Dolocytheridea donzei	Sp. nov	In press	Trabelsi et al.	Early Cretaceous (Albian)	Orbata	Tunisia		
Dorsogibbella alium	Sp. nov	Valid	Gonta	Ordovician		Russia		
Dorukella crasquinae	Sp. nov	In press	Sciuto & Temani in Sciuto, Temani & Ammar	Miocene (Messinian)		Tunisia	A member of Podocopa belonging to the family Hemicytheridae.	
Dorukella nevioi	Sp. nov	In press	Sciuto & Temani in Sciuto, Temani & Ammar	Miocene (Messinian)		Tunisia	A member of Podocopa belonging to the family Hemicytheridae.	
Dorukella razgallahae	Sp. nov	In press	Sciuto & Temani in Sciuto, Temani & Ammar	Miocene (Messinian)		Tunisia	A member of Podocopa belonging to the family Hemicytheridae.	
Dorukella ruggeroi	Sp. nov	In press	Sciuto & Temani in Sciuto, Temani & Ammar	Miocene (Messinian)		Tunisia	A member of Podocopa belonging to the family Hemicytheridae.	
Eumiraculum mettei	Sp. nov	Valid	Gliwa in Gliwa et al.	Permian (Wuchiapingian–Changhsingian)		Iran	A member of Podocopida belonging to the superfamily Bairdioidea.	
Fabalicypris veronicae	Sp. nov	Valid	Gliwa in Gliwa et al.	Permian (Changhsingian)		Iran	A member of Podocopida belonging to the family Bairdiidae.	
Foramenella sibirica	Sp. nov	Valid	Melnikova	Ordovician		Russia		
Graptocythere octopus	Sp. nov	In press	Sciuto & Temani in Sciuto, Temani & Ammar	Miocene (Messinian)		Tunisia	A member of Podocopa belonging to the family Hemicytheridae.	
Hallatina oblonga	Sp. nov	Valid	Melnikova	Ordovician		Russia	A member of the group Leperditellocopida belonging to the family Primitiidae.	
Hastacypris	Gen. et sp. nov	Junior homonym	Santos Filho, Fauth & Sames	Early Cretaceous	Orós Formation	Brazil	A member of Cypridoidea. Genus includes new species H. adamantem. The generic name is preoccupied by Hastacypris Croneis & Gutke (1939); Guillam (2024) coined a replacement name Cuspicypris.	
Heterocypris aspirasensis	Sp. nov	Valid	Durak, Akkiraz & Nazik	Early Miocene	Aspiras Basin	Turkey	A species of Heterocypris. Announced in 2020; the final version of the article naming it was published in 2021.	
Histriabairdia	Gen. et sp. et comb. nov	Valid	Forel in Forel & Grădinaru	Late Triassic (Carnian) to Middle Jurassic (Bathonian)		Austria; France; Germany; India; Italy; Romania; Switzerland	A member of Podocopida belonging to the family Bairdiidae. The type species is H. pontuseuxinusensis; genus also includes "Anchistrocheles"? spinosa Sheppard in Brand (1990), "Anchistrocheles"? tuningensis Beher (2004) and "Anchistrocheles" gemmellaroi Crasquin in Crasquin et al. (2018).	
Hungarella forelae	Sp. nov		Crasquin et al.	Late Triassic		Italy	A member of the family Healdiidae. Subsequently transferred to the genus Aneisohealdia.	
Hungarella siciliiensis	Sp. nov		Crasquin et al.	Late Triassic		Italy	A member of the family Healdiidae. Subsequently transferred to the genus Aneisohealdia.	
Hungaroleberis striatus	Sp. nov	Valid	Gliwa in Gliwa et al.	Permian (Changhsingian)		Iran	A member of Myodocopida belonging to the family Cylindroleberididae.	
Illativella triquetra	Sp. nov	Valid	Becker, Braun & Pratt	Devonian		Canada		
Ilyocypris? arca	Sp. nov	In press	Santos Filho, Fauth & Sames	Early Cretaceous	Orós Formation	Brazil		
Ilyocypris? latanodi	Sp. nov	In press	Santos Filho, Fauth & Sames	Early Cretaceous	Orós Formation	Brazil		
Isobythocypris atalantella	Sp. nov	Valid	Forel in Forel & Grădinaru	Late Triassic (Rhaetian)		Romania	A member of Podocopida belonging to the family Bairdiidae.	
Jonesites chunensis	Sp. nov	Valid	Gonta	Ordovician		Russia		
Kerocythere dittainoensis	Sp. nov		Crasquin et al.	Late Triassic		Italy	A member of the family Cytheruridae.	
Kiesowia (?) incerta	Sp. nov	Valid	Melnikova	Ordovician		Russia	A member of the family Ctenonotellidae.	
Kinkelinella ventrocarinata	Sp. nov	Valid	Cabral, Pinto & Lord in Cabral et al.	Early Jurassic (Toarcian)		Portugal; United Kingdom	A member of the family Protocytheridae.	
Kinnekullea gaia	Sp. nov	Valid	Hearing et al.	Ordovician (Katian)	Phu Ngu	Vietnam		
Korolyukina	Gen. et 2 sp. nov	Valid	Melnikova	Ordovician		Russia	A member of the family Bolliidae. Genus includes new species K. conspicua and K. taimyrica.	
Laccochilina (?) jugata	Sp. nov	Valid	Melnikova	Ordovician		Russia	A member of the family Eurychilinidae.	
Laccochilina (Prochilina) yanpingensis	Sp. nov	In press	Zhang	Ordovician	Shihtzupu Formation	China		
Leucocytherella dangeloi	Sp. nov	Valid	Alivernini in Alivernini et al.	Miocene (Messinian) and Pliocene	Zhada Basin	China	A member of the family Limnocytheridae.	
Liuzhinia julfensis	Sp. nov	Valid	Gliwa in Gliwa et al.	Late Permian and Early Triassic (Changhsingian–Griesbachian)		Iran	A member of Podocopida belonging to the superfamily Bairdioidea.	
Lyumellina	Gen. et sp. nov	Valid	Gonta	Ordovician		Russia	Genus includes new species L. risus	
Minyocythere	Gen. et 2 sp. et comb. nov	Valid	Lord, Cabral & Danielopol	Middle Jurassic (Aalenian and Bajocian)		Germany Netherlands; United Kingdom	A cytherid Podocopida. The type species is M. macroporosa; genus also includes new species M. angulata, as well as "Dolocythere" maculosa Bate (1963) and "Dolocythere" tuberculata Luppold (2012).	
Mockella barbroae	Sp. nov		Crasquin et al.	Late Triassic		Italy	A member of the family Limnocytheridae.	
Mongolianella kyranbeki	Sp. nov	In press	Choi et al.	Cretaceous	Yanji	China		
Myanmarcypris	Gen. et sp. nov	Valid	Wang et al.	Late Cretaceous (Cenomanian)	Burmese amber	Myanmar	A member of the family Candonidae belonging to the subfamily Paracypridinae. Genus includes new species M. hui.	
Nikolina entonipteros	Sp. nov	Valid	Gonta	Ordovician		Russia		
Nikolina pteroventralis	Sp. nov	Valid	Gonta	Ordovician		Russia		
Okadaleberis (?) benzartiae	Sp. nov	In press	Sciuto & Temani in Sciuto, Temani & Ammar	Miocene (Messinian)		Tunisia	A member of Podocopa belonging to the family Trachyleberididae.	
Okadaleberis decimai	Sp. nov	In press	Sciuto & Temani in Sciuto, Temani & Ammar	Miocene (Messinian)		Tunisia	A member of Podocopa belonging to the family Trachyleberididae.	
Okadaleberis guerneti	Sp. nov	In press	Sciuto & Temani in Sciuto, Temani & Ammar	Miocene (Messinian)		Tunisia	A member of Podocopa belonging to the family Trachyleberididae.	
Okadaleberis hendae	Sp. nov	In press	Sciuto & Temani in Sciuto, Temani & Ammar	Miocene (Messinian)		Tunisia	A member of Podocopa belonging to the family Trachyleberididae.	
Okadaleberis khayatii	Sp. nov	In press	Sciuto & Temani in Sciuto, Temani & Ammar	Miocene (Messinian)		Tunisia	A member of Podocopa belonging to the family Trachyleberididae.	
Okadaleberis memmiae	Sp. nov	In press	Sciuto & Temani in Sciuto, Temani & Ammar	Miocene (Messinian)		Tunisia	A member of Podocopa belonging to the family Trachyleberididae.	
Orthobairdia capuliformis	Sp. nov	Valid	Gliwa in Gliwa et al.	Permian (Changhsingian)		Iran	A member of Podocopida belonging to the family Bairdiidae.	
Paijenborchellina reitanoi	Sp. nov	In press	Sciuto & Temani in Sciuto, Temani & Ammar	Miocene (Messinian)		Tunisia	A member of Podocopa belonging to the family Cytheridae.	
Paractinocythereis	Gen. et comb. nov	Valid	Yasuhara et al.	Early Miocene		India	A new genus for "Actinocythereis" gujaratensis Tewari & Tandon (1960)	
Paracypris chekhmai	Sp. nov	In press	Trabelsi et al.	Early Cretaceous (Aptian)	Orbata	Tunisia		
Paracypris ovidi	Sp. nov	Valid	Forel in Forel & Grădinaru	Late Triassic (Rhaetian)		Romania	A member of Cypridoidea belonging to the family Paracyprididae.	
Perissocytheridea altesulcata	Sp. nov	In press	Trabelsi et al.	Early Cretaceous (Aptian)	Orbata	Tunisia		
Perissocytheridea kouminiensis	Sp. nov	In press	Trabelsi et al.	Early Cretaceous (Albian)	Orbata	Tunisia		
Petasobairdia amazonella	Sp. nov	Valid	Forel in Forel & Grădinaru	Late Triassic (Rhaetian)		Romania	A member of the family Bairdiidae.	
Petasobairdia jeandercourti	Sp. nov		Crasquin et al.	Late Triassic		Italy	A member of the family Bairdiidae.	
Pontocypris? karavankensis	Sp. nov	Valid	Forel in Forel, Kolar-Jurkovšek & Jurkovšek	Late Triassic (Carnian)		Slovenia	A member of Cypridoidea belonging to the family Pontocyprididae.	
Postsinusella	Gen. et sp. nov	Valid	Gonta	Ordovician		Russia	Genus includes new species P. guttaformis.	
Prasuchonella? huarpe	Sp. nov	Valid	Carignano, Echevarría & Zavattieri	Middle Triassic	Cuyo Basin	Argentina	A member of Darwinulocopina.	
Pseudoleperditia? vetusta	Sp. nov	Valid	Becker, Braun & Pratt	Devonian		Canada		
Pseudomacrocypris? kerabani	Sp. nov	Valid	Forel in Forel & Grădinaru	Late Triassic (Rhaetian)		Romania	A member of Cypridoidea belonging to the family Pontocyprididae.	
Pseudulrichia replicata	Sp. nov	Valid	Melnikova	Ordovician		Russia	A member of the family Richinidae.	
Ptychobairdia iudicaensis	Sp. nov		Crasquin et al.	Late Triassic		Italy	A member of the family Bairdiidae. Subsequently transferred to the genus Petasobairdia.	
Ptychobairdia leonardoi	Sp. nov		Crasquin et al.	Late Triassic		Italy	A member of the family Bairdiidae.	
Pythagoracypris	Gen. et sp. nov	In press	Santos Filho, Fauth & Sames	Early Cretaceous	Orós Formation	Brazil	Genus includes new species P. latavectis.	
Rhinocypris? ericius	Sp. nov	In press	Santos Filho, Fauth & Sames	Early Cretaceous	Orós Formation	Brazil		
Ruggieria quadricarinata	Sp. nov	In press	Sciuto & Temani in Sciuto, Temani & Ammar	Miocene (Messinian)		Tunisia	A member of Podocopa belonging to the family Cytherettidae.	
Steusloffia rudiformis	Sp. nov	Valid	Gonta	Ordovician		Russia		
Sulcicuneus gemmifer	Sp. nov	Valid	Becker, Braun & Pratt	Devonian		Canada		
Tasmanocypris lochardi	Sp. nov	In press	Warne	Late Miocene and Pliocene		Australia		
Tesakovites	Gen. et sp. nov	Valid	Melnikova	Ordovician		Russia	A member of the family Circulinidae. Genus includes new species T. rotundatus.	
Urftella triangula	Sp. nov	Valid	Becker, Braun & Pratt	Devonian		Canada		
Urocythere (Pokornyella) salaktaensis	Sp. nov	In press	Sciuto & Temani in Sciuto, Temani & Ammar	Miocene (Messinian)		Tunisia	A member of Podocopa belonging to the family Hemicytheridae.	
Velatomorpha rochacamposi	Sp. nov	Valid	Bergue, Maranhao & Ng	Permian		Brazil		

==== Other crustaceans ====
Name	Novelty	Status	Authors	Age	Type locality	Country	Notes	Images
Actinobalanus? sloveniensis	Sp. nov	Valid	Buckeridge et al.	Oligocene and Miocene		Slovenia	A barnacle.	
Altiverruca capsa	Sp. nov	Valid	Gale	Pliocene-early Pleistocene		Indian Ocean (Mascarene Plateau)	A barnacle belonging to the family Verrucidae.	
Altiverruca fusione	Sp. nov	Valid	Gale	Pliocene-early Pleistocene		Indian Ocean (Mascarene Plateau)	A barnacle belonging to the family Verrucidae.	
Ambocyclus	Gen. et comb. nov	Valid	Schweitzer, Mychko & Feldmann	Carboniferous		Ireland; Russia; United States?	A member of Cyclida. Genus includes A. capidulum (Chernyschev, 1933), A. simulans (Reed, 1908) and possibly A. ? minutus (Rogers, 1902).	
Angulotergum kiamichensis	Sp. nov	Valid	Gale	Cretaceous		United States	A barnacle.	
Angulotergum milviformis	Sp. nov	Valid	Gale	Cretaceous		United States	A barnacle.	
Angulotergum robustum	Sp. nov	Valid	Gale	Cretaceous		United States	A barnacle.	
Arcoscalpellum s.l. isaonishikawai	Sp. nov	Valid	Karasawa	Miocene	Katsuta Group	Japan	A member of the family Scalpellidae.	
Arcoscalpellum s.l. Joei	Sp. nov	Valid	Karasawa	Miocene	Yotsuyaku Formation	Japan	A member of the family Scalpellidae.	
Arcuatoscalpellum wacoensis	Sp. nov	Valid	Gale	Cretaceous		United States	A barnacle.	
Ashinkailepas indica	Sp. nov	Valid	Gale in Gale et al.	Late Pleistocene		India	A barnacle	
Aurivillialepas mascarensis	Sp. nov	Valid	Gale	Pleistocene		Indian Ocean (Mascarene Plateau)	A barnacle belonging to the family Calanticidae.	
Brachylepas hantonensis	Sp. nov	Valid	Gale	Cretaceous		United Kingdom	A barnacle	
Brachylepas thieli	Sp. nov	Valid	Gale	Cretaceous		Germany	A barnacle	
Brittaniclus	Gen. et comb. nov	Valid	Schweitzer, Mychko & Feldmann	Carboniferous		United Kingdom	A member of Cyclida belonging to the family Americlidae. Genus includes B. rankini (Woodward, 1868), B. scotti (Woodward, 1894) and B. testudo (Peach, 1882).	
Carabicyclus	Gen. et comb. nov	Valid	Schweitzer, Mychko & Feldmann	Carboniferous		Ireland; United Kingdom	A member of Cyclida. Genus includes C. wrighti (Woodward, 1870).	
Catherinum busselli	Sp. nov	Valid	Gale	Pliocene-early Pleistocene		Indian Ocean (Mascarene Plateau)	A barnacle belonging to the family Scalpellidae.	
Chernyshevine	Gen. et comb. nov	Valid	Schweitzer, Mychko & Feldmann	Carboniferous		Tajikistan	A member of Cyclida. Genus includes C. spinosus (Chernyschev, 1933).	
Collinslepas	Gen. et 3 sp. nov	Valid	Gale	Cretaceous		Morocco; Tunisia	A barnacle. Genus includes new species C. aitlaminensis, C. robustus and C. tunisiensis.	
Costatolepas	Gen. et sp. nov	Valid	Gale	Pliocene-early Pleistocene		Indian Ocean (Mascarene Plateau)	A barnacle belonging to the family Scalpellidae. The type species is C. buckeridgei.	
Costatoverruca baxteri	Sp. nov	Valid	Gale	Pliocene-early Pleistocene		Indian Ocean (Mascarene Plateau)	A barnacle belonging to the family Verrucidae.	
Costatoverruca macropluteum	Sp. nov	Valid	Gale	Pleistocene		Indian Ocean (Mascarene Plateau)	A barnacle belonging to the family Verrucidae.	
Costatoverruca tredecima	Sp. nov	Valid	Gale	Pleistocene		Indian Ocean (Mascarene Plateau)	A barnacle belonging to the family Verrucidae.	
Cretiscalpellum robaszynskii	Sp. nov	In press	Gale, Jagt & Goolaerts	Late Cretaceous (Maastrichtian)		Tunisia	A barnacle.	
Daohugounaias	Gen. et sp. nov	Valid	Luo et al.	Middle Jurassic	Daohugou	China	A member of Anostraca. Genus includes new species D. cheni.	
Diotascalpellum acies	Sp. nov	Valid	Gale	Cretaceous		United States	A barnacle.	
Dziklus	Gen. et comb. nov	Valid	Schweitzer, Mychko & Feldmann	Carboniferous	Mazon Creek fossil beds	United States	A member of Cyclida belonging to the family Americlidae. Genus includes D. obesus (Schram, Vonk & Hof, 1997).	
Eoverruca aubensis	Sp. nov	Valid	Gale	Early Cretaceous (Albian)		France	A barnacle	
Eoverruca symmetrica	Sp. nov	Valid	Gale	Late Cretaceous (Campanian)		United Kingdom	A barnacle	
Etcheslepas portlandensis	Sp. nov	Valid	Gale	Tithonian–Berriasian	Portland Group	United Kingdom	A barnacle	
Fallaxlepas	Gen. et comb. nov	Valid	Gale	Cretaceous		United Kingdom	A brachylepadid barnacle. The type species is "Pollicipes" fallax Darwin (1851)	
Gibbosaverruca youngi	Sp. nov	Valid	Gale	Pliocene-early Pleistocene		Indian Ocean (Mascarene Plateau)	A barnacle belonging to the family Verrucidae.	
Iliestheria urumqiensis	Sp. nov	Valid	Teng & Li	Early Jurassic (Pliensbachian–Toarcian)	Sangonghe	China	A clam shrimp. Announced in 2020; the final version of the article naming was published in 2021.	
Ivolepas worthensis	Sp. nov	Valid	Gale	Cretaceous		United States	A barnacle.	
Jagtscalpellum	Gen. et comb. et 3 sp. nov	Valid	Gale	Cretaceous		Kazakhstan; Tunisia; United Kingdom; United States	A barnacle. The type species is "Pollicipes" striatus Darwin (1851); genus also includes "Pollicipes" filosus Withers (1911), "Arcoscalpellum" gaultinum Withers (1935), "Cretiscalpellum striatum" var. dissimile Withers (1935) and "Cretiscalpellum" niadini Alekseev (2009), as well as new species J. africanum, J. spinosum and J. luteorum.	
Lahuerguinagrapta	Gen. et sp. nov	In press	Gallego et al.	Early Cretaceous	La Huérguina	Spain	An afrograptid clam shrimp. Genus includes new species L. multicostata.	
Litocyclus	Gen. et comb. nov	Valid	Schweitzer, Mychko & Feldmann	Carboniferous		Ireland; United Kingdom; United States?	A member of Cyclida. Genus includes L. bilobatus (Woodward, 1870), L. jonesianus (Woodward, 1870), L. torosus (Woodward, 1870) and possibly also L. ? communis (Rogers, 1902) and L. ? permarginatus (Rogers, 1902).	
Lophobalanus fresvillensis	Sp. nov	Valid	Gale	Eocene (Lutetian)		France	A barnacle. Announced in 2020; the final version of the article naming it was published in 2021.	
Loriculina fragila	Sp. nov	Valid	Gale	Cretaceous		United States	A barnacle.	
Loriculina rubrifluvia	Sp. nov	Valid	Gale	Cretaceous		United States	A barnacle.	
Loriolepas whytei	Sp. nov	Valid	Gale	Tithonian–Berriasian		United Kingdom	A barnacle	
Newmaniverruca multitabulata	Sp. nov	Valid	Gale	Pliocene-early Pleistocene		Indian Ocean (Mascarene Plateau)	A barnacle belonging to the family Verrucidae.	
Pachylasma traceyi	Sp. nov	Valid	Gale	Pliocene-Pleistocene		Indian Ocean (Mascarene Plateau)	A barnacle belonging to the family Pachylasmatidae.	
Proverruca anglica	Sp. nov	Valid	Gale	Cretaceous		United Kingdom	A barnacle	
Regioscalpellum kennedyi	Sp. nov	Valid	Gale	Cretaceous		Tunisia	A barnacle	
Rostratoverruca darwini	Sp. nov	Valid	Gale	Pliocene-early Pleistocene		Indian Ocean (Mascarene Plateau)	A barnacle belonging to the family Verrucidae.	
Striascalpellum	Gen. et 3 sp. et comb. nov	Valid	Gale	Cretaceous		Sweden; United Kingdom	A barnacle. The type species is S. elegans; genus also includes new species S. barringtonensis (subsequently transferred to the genus Virgilepas) and S. bromleyi, as well as "Scalpellum (Titanolepas)" martini Withers (1935).	
Subsecolepas	Gen. et sp. nov	Valid	Gale	Cretaceous		United Kingdom	A barnacle. The type species is S. holtwilsoni.	
Tazawacyclus	Gen. et comb. nov	Valid	Schweitzer, Mychko & Feldmann	Carboniferous		Japan	A member of Cyclida. Genus includes T. tazawai (Niko & Ibaraki, 2011).	
Texaslepas	Gen. et sp. nov	Valid	Gale	Cretaceous		United States	A barnacle. Genus includes new species T. holterhoffi.	
Vectibalanus	Gen. et comb. et sp. nov	Valid	Gale	Eocene and Oligocene	Barton; Bouldnor; Headon Hill; Selsey	United Kingdom	A barnacle. The type species is "Balanus" unguiformis Sowerby (1846); genus also includes "Balanus" erisma Sowerby (1846) and a new species V. mortoni. Announced in 2020; the final version of the article naming it was published in 2021.	
Virgilepas	Gen. et 3 sp. nov	Valid	Gale	Cretaceous		Morocco; United Kingdom	A barnacle. Genus includes new species V. aboudaensis, V. peakei and V. hancocki.	
Virgiscalpellum laevis	Sp. nov	Valid	Gale	Cretaceous		United Kingdom	A barnacle. Subsequently made the type species of the separate genus Laeviscalpellum.	
Virgiscalpellum marysensis	Sp. nov	Valid	Gale	Cretaceous		United States	A barnacle.	
Virgiscalpellum mhrilensis	Sp. nov	Valid	Gale	Cretaceous		Tunisia	A barnacle	
Virgiscalpellum multilineatum	Sp. nov	Valid	Gale	Cretaceous		Tunisia	A barnacle	
Virgiscalpellum rugosum	Sp. nov	Valid	Gale	Cretaceous		United States	A barnacle. Subsequently transferred to the genus Laeviscalpellum.	
Virgiscalpellum sussexiense	Sp. nov	Valid	Gale	Cretaceous		United Kingdom	A barnacle	
Virgiscalpellum truncatum	Sp. nov	Valid	Gale	Cretaceous		United Kingdom	A barnacle	
Witherscalpellum	Gen. et comb. nov	Valid	Gale	Cretaceous		France United Kingdom	A barnacle. The type species is "Cretiscalpellum aptiensis Withers (1935); genus also includes "Cretiscalpellum" matrioni Gale (2019).	

=== General research ===
- Redescription and a study on the phylogenetic relationships of Francocaris grimmi, based on data from new fossil material from the Solnhofen Limestone (Germany), is published by Pazinato et al. (2020).
- A hermit crab belonging to the family Pylochelidae preserved in a shell of an ammonite belonging to the species Craspedites nekrassovi will be described from the Upper Jurassic of Moscow, Russia by Mironenko (2020).
- A putative lobster Tricarina gadvanensis from the Early Cretaceous of Iran is reinterpreted as a seroloid isopod by Hyžný et al. (2020).
- A study on the phylogenetic relationships of Eocarcinus praecursor is published by Scholtz (2020).
- A study on anatomical adaptations that enabled an ecological transition into the water column in Silurian myodocopes, focusing on myodocopids from the Herefordshire Lagerstätte (United Kingdom), is published by Siveter, Perrier & Williams (2020).
- A study comparing sexual dimorphism in ostracods from the Gulf and Atlantic coastal plain before and after the Cretaceous–Paleogene extinction event is published by Martins et al. (2020).
- Redescription of Americlus rankini and a study on the paleoecology of this taxon is published by Clark et al. (2020).

== Trilobites ==
=== New taxa ===
Name	Novelty	Status	Authors	Age	Type locality	Country	Notes	Images
Acastoides biebrichensis	Sp. nov	Valid	Alberti	Devonian (Emsian)	Rupbach Shale	Germany	A member of the family Acastidae.	
Acastoides requadti	Sp. nov	Valid	Alberti	Devonian (Emsian)	Rupbach Shale	Germany	A member of the family Acastidae.	
Aciculolenus askewi	Sp. nov	Valid	Chatterton	Cambrian (Jiangshanian)		Canada		
Arduennella hainauensis	Sp. nov	Valid	Van Viersen & Alberti	Devonian (Emsian)		Germany		
Atlanticalymene	Gen. et sp. nov	Valid	Adrain, Karim & McAdams	Ordovician (Darriwilian)	Table Cove Formation	Canada	A calymenine trilobite. The type species is A. bardensis.	
Balvibole	Gen. et sp. nov	Valid	Basse & Lemke	Devonian (Famennian)	Dasberg Limestone	Germany	A cyrtosymboline trilobite. Genus includes new species B. kaufmanni.	
Blountia angelae	Sp. nov	Valid	Armstrong, Westrop & Eoff	Cambrian	Nolichucky Formation	United States	A member of the family Kingstoniidae.	
Blountia morgancreekensis	Sp. nov	Valid	Armstrong, Westrop & Eoff	Cambrian	Riley Formation	United States	A member of the family Kingstoniidae.	
Blountia nevadensis	Sp. nov	Valid	Armstrong, Westrop & Eoff	Cambrian	Mendha Formation	United States	A member of the family Kingstoniidae.	
Blountia newfoundlandensis	Sp. nov	Valid	Armstrong, Westrop & Eoff	Cambrian	Shallow Bay Formation	Canada	A member of the family Kingstoniidae.	
Blountia tennesseensis	Sp. nov	Valid	Armstrong, Westrop & Eoff	Cambrian	Nolichucky Formation	United States	A member of the family Kingstoniidae.	
Boethiusia	Gen. et comb. nov	Valid	Geyer	Cambrian		Italy	A new genus for "Dolerolenus" courtessolei Pillola (1991).	
Clappaspis tupeq	Sp. nov	Valid	Peel	Cambrian (Miaolingian)	Telt Bugt Formation	Greenland	A member of the family Alokistocaridae.	
Cliffia nicoleae	Sp. nov	Valid	Chatterton	Cambrian (Jiangshanian)		Canada		
Cyphaspides paulospinatus	Sp. nov	Valid	Alberti	Devonian		Germany	A member of Proetida belonging to the family Aulacopleuridae.	
Cyphaspides speculator	Sp. nov	Valid	Alberti	Devonian		Germany	A member of Proetida belonging to the family Aulacopleuridae.	
Dicranurus webbyi	Sp. nov	Valid	Holloway, Smith & Thomas	Ordovician (Katian)	Gunningbland Formation	Australia	An odontopleurid trilobite.	
Ehmaniella sermersuaqensis	Sp. nov	Valid	Peel	Cambrian (Miaolingian)	Telt Bugt Formation	Greenland	A member of the family Alokistocaridae.	
Elrathia hensonensis	Nom. nov	Valid	Geyer & Peel	Cambrian	Ekspedition Bræ Formation	Greenland	A replacement name for Elrathia groenlandica Geyer & Peel (2017).	
Eowinterbergia effenbergensis	Sp. nov	Valid	Basse & Lemke	Devonian (Famennian)	Wocklum Limestone	Germany		
Epicurella	Gen. et sp. nov	Valid	Geyer	Cambrian		Morocco	A member of the family Despujolsiidae. Genus includes new species E. pustulata.	
Feistops	Gen. et 2 sp. nov	Valid	Crônier et al.	Devonian (Famennian)		Mongolia	A phacopid trilobite. Genus includes new species F. mongoliensis and F. khovdensis. Announced in 2020; the final version of the article naming was published in 2021.	
Gravicalymene bakeri	Sp. nov	In press	Smith & Ebach	Ordovician (Katian)	Gordon Group	Australia	A calymenid trilobite.	
?Houseops olonbulagensis	Sp. nov	Valid	Crônier et al.	Devonian (Famennian)		Mongolia	A phacopid trilobite. Announced in 2020; the final version of the article naming was published in 2021.	
Kingaspidoides spinirecurvatus	Sp. nov	Valid	Geyer, Pais & Wotte	Cambrian	Jbel Wawrmast Formation	Morocco	A member of Redlichiida belonging to the family Ellipsocephalidae.	
Marsaisia devoillei	Sp. nov	Valid	Geyer	Cambrian		Morocco	A member of the family Despujolsiidae.	
Marsaisia? lemdadensis	Sp. nov	Valid	Geyer	Cambrian		Morocco	A member of the family Despujolsiidae.	
Phantaspis	Gen. et sp. nov	Valid	Sun, Zeng & Zhao	Cambrian (Wuliuan)	Mantou Formation	China	A member of Ptychopariacea of uncertain phylogenetic placement. The type species is P. auritus.	
Proabadiella	Gen. et 2 sp. nov	Valid	Liñán et al.	Cambrian Stage 3	Pusa Formation	Spain	Genus includes new species P. toletana and P. vidalii.	
Prophalaron	Gen. et sp. nov	Valid	Holloway, Smith & Thomas	Ordovician (Katian)	Gunningbland Formation	Australia	A calymenid trilobite. Genus includes new species P. jonesi.	
Prosaukia oculata	Sp. nov	Valid	Wernette et al.	Cambrian (Furongian)	Ao Mo Lae Formation	Thailand		
Satunarcus	Gen. et sp. nov	Valid	Wernette et al.	Late Cambrian	Ao Mo Lae Formation	Thailand	A kaolishaniid trilobite belonging to the new subfamily Ceronocarinae. Genus includes new species S. molaensis.	
Saukianda? dresnayi	Sp. nov	In press	Geyer & Landing	Cambrian		Moroccan‒Algerian border region		
Treveropyge hellemondi	Sp. nov	Valid	Van Viersen & Taghon	Devonian (Emsian)	Our Formation	Belgium	A member of the family Acastidae.	
Utia debra	Sp. nov	Valid	Sundberg	Cambrian (Wuliuan)	Lakeview Limestone; Spence Shale	United States	A member of Ptychopariida belonging to the family Utiidae.	

=== General research ===
- A study on the timing of the trilobite extinctions at the early to middle Cambrian transition is published by Sundberg et al. (2020).
- Evidence of gregarious moulting of Cambrian (Stage 4) trilobites from the "Tsinghsutung" Formation (China), representing one of the earliest records of synchronized moulting behaviours in the fossil record, is presented by Corrales-García et al. (2020).
- A study on trilobite size variations in the Ordovician Fezouata Formation (Morocco) deposited in a cold-water environment is published by Saleh et al. (2020).
- A study on the nature of variation among oryctocephalid specimens from the Combined Metals Member of the Pioche Formation (Nevada; Cambrian Stage 4) will be published by Webster & Sundberg (2020).
- A study on the ontogeny of the olenid trilobite Leptoplastides salteri is published by Månsson & Clarkson (2020).
- A study on the anatomy of the internal structures of the compound eye of Aulacopleura koninckii is published by Schoenemann & Clarkson (2020).
- A study on exuviae of Ovalocephalus tetrasulcatus from the Ordovician Linhsiang Formation (Hubei, China) is published by Zong (2020), who reports exuviae arranged with two or three together end to end or superimposed, and evaluates the implications of these findings for the knowledge of the behavior of trilobites.

== Other arthropods ==
=== Newly named taxa ===
Name	Novelty	Status	Authors	Age	Type locality	Country	Notes	Images
Adelophthalmus pyrrhae	Sp. nov	Valid	Lamsdell et al.	Carboniferous (Tournaisian)	St. Nazaire Group (possibly Lydiennes Formation)	France	A eurypterid.	
Allolimulus	Gen. et comb. nov	Disputed	Lamsdell	Jurassic		United Kingdom	A horseshoe crab. The type species is "Limulus" woodwardi Watson (1909). However, Bicknell et al. (2021) transferred "L." woodwardi to the genus Mesolimulus.	(A) Norilimulus woodae, (B) Batracholimulus fuchsbergensis, (C) Boeotiaspis longispinus, (D) Keuperlimulis vicensis, (E) Volanalimulus madagascarensis, (F) Allolimulus woodwardi
Andersoniella	Gen. et comb. nov	Valid	Lamsdell	Carboniferous		Germany; United States	A member of the family Belinuridae. The type species is "Euproops" longispina Packard (1885).	
Batracholimulus	Gen. et comb. nov	Valid	Lamsdell	Triassic		Germany	A member of the family Austrolimulidae. The type species is "Paleolimulus" fuchsbergensis Hauschke & Wilde (1987).	
Boeotiaspis	Gen. et comb. nov	Valid	Lamsdell	Carboniferous		United States	A member of the family Austrolimulidae. The type species is "Paleolimulus" longispinus Schram (1979).	
Bushizheia	Gen. et sp. nov	Valid	O'Flynn & Liu in O'Flynn et al.	Cambrian Stage 3	Chiungchussu	China	An early euarthropod of uncertain phylogenetic placement. The type species is B. yangi.	
Concavicaris martinae	Sp. nov	Valid	Broda, Rak & Hegna	Devonian (Famennian)		Czech Republic	A thylacocephalan.	
Concavicaris pikae	Sp. nov	Valid	Broda, Rak & Hegna	Devonian (Famennian)		Poland	A thylacocephalan.	
Concavicaris submarinus	Sp. nov		Jobbins, Haug & Klug	Devonian (Famennian)		Morocco	A thylacocephalan.	
Concavicaris woodruffensis	Sp. nov	Valid	Broda, Rak & Hegna	Devonian (Famennian)	Woodruff Formation	United States	A thylacocephalan.	
Devonopilio	Gen. et sp. nov	Valid	Tihelka, Tian & Cai	Devonian (Pragian)	Rhynie chert	United Kingdom	Originally described as a member of Opiliones, but this interpretation was subsequently questioned by Pérez-González & Shultz (2021), who were unsure about the phylogenetic placement of this arthropod, but noted anatomical similarities with the euthycarcinoid species Heterocrania rhyniensis. The type species is D. hutchinsoni.	
Diplacanthocaris	Gen. et sp. nov	Valid	Ji et al.	Early Triassic		China	A thylacocephalan. Genus includes new species D. chaohuensis.	
Dolesea	Gen. et sp. nov	Valid	Hannibal & May	Permian (Cisuralian)	Richards Spur locality	United States (Oklahoma)	A millipede belonging to the group Helminthomorpha. The type species is D. subtila.	
Ericixerxes	Gen. et sp. nov		Gueriau et al.	Devonian (Famennian)	Evieux	Belgium	A member of Euthycarcinoidea. The type species is E. potii.	
Hipponicharion perforata	Sp. nov	Valid	Skovsted et al.	Cambrian	Mural	Canada	A member of Bradoriida belonging to the family Hipponicharionidae.	
Itagnostus idahoensis	Sp. nov	Valid	Sundberg	Cambrian (Wuliuan)	Emigrant Formation; Lakeview Limestone	United States	A member of Agnostida belonging to the family Peronopsidae.	
Kanoshoia	Gen. et sp. nov	Valid	Lerosey-Aubril et al.	Cambrian (Drumian)	Wheeler Shale	United States	A megacheiran. Genus includes new species K. rectifrons.	
Karstiulus	Gen. et sp. nov	Valid	Hannibal & May	Permian (Cisuralian)	Richards Spur locality	United States (Oklahoma)	A millipede belonging to the group Juliformia, possibly a member of the superfamily Xyloiuloidea. The type species is K. fortsillensis.	
Keuperlimulus	Gen. et comb. nov	Valid	Lamsdell	Triassic		France	A horseshoe crab. The type species is "Limulus" vicensis Bleicher (1897).	
Macrobelinurus	Gen. et comb. nov	Valid	Lamsdell	Carboniferous		United Kingdom	A member of the family Belinuridae. The type species is "Steropis" arcuatus Baily (1859).	
Mesolimulus tafraoutensis	Sp. nov	In press	Lamsdell et al.	Late Cretaceous (Cenomanian–Turonian)	Gara Sbaa Lagerstätte	Morocco	A horseshoe crab.	
Microcaris rectilineatus	Sp. nov	Valid	Ji et al.	Early Triassic		China	A thylacocephalan. Ehiro & Kano (2024) considered it to be a species belonging to the genus Parisicaris.	
Norilimulus	Gen. et comb. nov	Valid	Lamsdell	Carboniferous (Tournaisian)	Horton Bluff Formation	Canada	A member of Xiphosura belonging to the family Paleolimulidae. The type species is "Paleolimulus" woodae Lerner, Lucas & Mansky (2016).	
Oklahomasoma	Gen. et sp. nov	Valid	Hannibal & May	Permian (Cisuralian)	Richards Spur locality	United States (Oklahoma)	A millipede belonging to the group Helminthomorpha. The type species is O. richardsspurense.	
Parabelinurus	Gen. et comb. nov	Valid	Lamsdell	Carboniferous		Russia; Ukraine; United States	A member of the family Belinuridae. The type species is "Enthomolithus" lunatus Martin (1809); genus also includes P. iswariensis (Chernyshev, 1928), P. lacoei (Packard, 1885), P. metschetensis (Chernyshev, 1928) and P. stepanovi (Chernyshev, 1928).	
Paraconcavicaris	Gen. et comb. nov	Valid	Broda, Rak & Hegna	Carboniferous (Tournaisian)	Líšeň Formation	Czech Republic	A thylacocephalan; a new genus for "Concavicaris" viktoryni Rak, Broda & Kumpan (2018).	
Parioscorpio	Gen. et sp. nov		Wendruff et al.	Silurian (Telychian)	Brandon Bridge	United States	An arthropod of uncertain phylogenetic placement. Originally classified as an early scorpion, but subsequently argued to be basal to crown group Mandibulata and Chelicerata. The type species is P. venator.	
Patesia	Gen. et comb. nov	Valid	Bicknell & Smith	Late Devonian		United States	A stem xiphosurid; a new genus for "Kasibelinurus" randalli. Announced in 2020; the final version of the article naming it was published in 2021.	
Pauropsxenus extraneus	Sp. nov	In press	Su, Cai & Huang	Late Cretaceous (Cenomanian)	Burmese amber	Myanmar	A millipede belonging to the family Polyxenidae.	
Pauropsxenus ordinatus	Sp. nov	In press	Su, Cai & Huang	Late Cretaceous (Cenomanian)	Burmese amber	Myanmar	A millipede belonging to the family Polyxenidae.	
Pruemopterus	Gen. et sp. nov	Valid	Poschmann	Early Devonian		Germany	A eurypterid. Genus includes new species P. salgadoi. Announced in 2020; the final version of the article naming it was published in 2021.	
Pseudobeyrichona taurata	Sp. nov	Valid	Skovsted et al.	Cambrian	Mural	Canada	A member of Bradoriida belonging to the family Hipponicharionidae.	
Shpineviolimulus	Gen. et comb. nov		Bicknell, Naugolnykh & Brougham	Permian (Asselian)	Araukaritovaya Formation	Ukraine	A member of Xiphosura belonging to the group Limulina; a new genus for "Paleolimulus" jakovlevi Glushenko & Ivanov (1961).	
Sklerolibyon	Gen. et sp. nov		Aria et al.	Cambrian Stage 3	Maotianshan Shale Member of the Yu'anshan Formation	China	A megacheiran related to Jianfengia and Fortiforceps. The type species is S. maomima.	
Soligorskopterus shpinevi	Sp. nov	Valid	Naugolnykh & Areshin	Late Devonian		Russia	An eurypterid. Announced in 2019; the final version of the article naming it was published in 2020.	
Tariccoia tazagurtensis	Sp. nov	Valid	Pérez-Peris et al.	Early Ordovician	Fezouata	Morocco	A nektaspid arthropod. Announced in 2020; the final version of the article naming it was published in 2021.	
Thelxiope holmani	Sp. nov	Valid	Lerosey-Aubril, Skabelund & Ortega-Hernández	Cambrian (Drumian)	Wheeler Shale	United States	A possible member of Chelicerata.	
Volanalimulus	Gen. et sp. nov	Valid	Lamsdell	Early Triassic	Ankitokazo Basin	Madagascar	A horseshoe crab. The type species is V. madagascarensis.	
Xiaocaris	Gen. et sp. nov		Liu et al.	Cambrian Stage 3	Chiungchussu Formation	China	A member of the group Fuxianhuiida. The type species is X. luoi.	
Xiazhuangocaris	Gen. et sp. nov	Valid	Zeng et al.	Cambrian Stage 3	Hongjingshao Formation	China	A member of Hymenocarina. Genus includes new species X. chenggongensis. Announced in 2020; the final version of the article naming it was published in 2021.	

=== General research ===
- Exceptionally preserved specimens of Chuandianella ovata carrying a large number of small eggs are described from the Cambrian Chengjiang biota (China) by Ou et al. (2020), who compare the reproductive strategies of C. ovata and closely related Waptia fieldensis.
- Sun, Zeng & Zhao (2020) report the discovery of a member of the genus Sidneyia belonging or related to the species S. inexpectans from the Wuliuan Mantou Formation of North China, expanding known distribution of this genus.
- A putative xiphosuran Kiaeria is reinterpreted as a member of Chasmataspidida by Lamsdell (2020a).
- A study on the anatomy of head structures of Heterocrania rhyniensis, evaluating its implications for the knowledge of the phylogenetic relationships of euthycarcinoids, is published by Edgecombe et al. (2020).
- A study on heterochrony in Xiphosura, showing that clades that occupy non-marine environments show elevated rates of peramorphosis or paedomorphosis is published by Lamsdell (2020b).
- A study on the morphology of the feeding apparatuses of Eurypterida and Trigonotarbida is published by Haug (2020).
- A study aiming to determine the range of prey sizes that could be captured by sweep-feeding eurypterids is published by Hughes & Lamsdell (2020).
- A study on the anatomy and phylogenetic relationships of Anhelkocephalon handlirschi is published by Schädel & Haug (2020), who interpret this taxon as a probable member of Cyclida rather than an isopod.
- Liu et al. (2020) report evidence of the presence of a three-dimensionally preserved labrum associated with the mouth opening in juvenile specimens of Leanchoilia illecebrosa.
