= Grès à Voltzia =

Geologic formation in France

- Stratigraphic range: Anisian
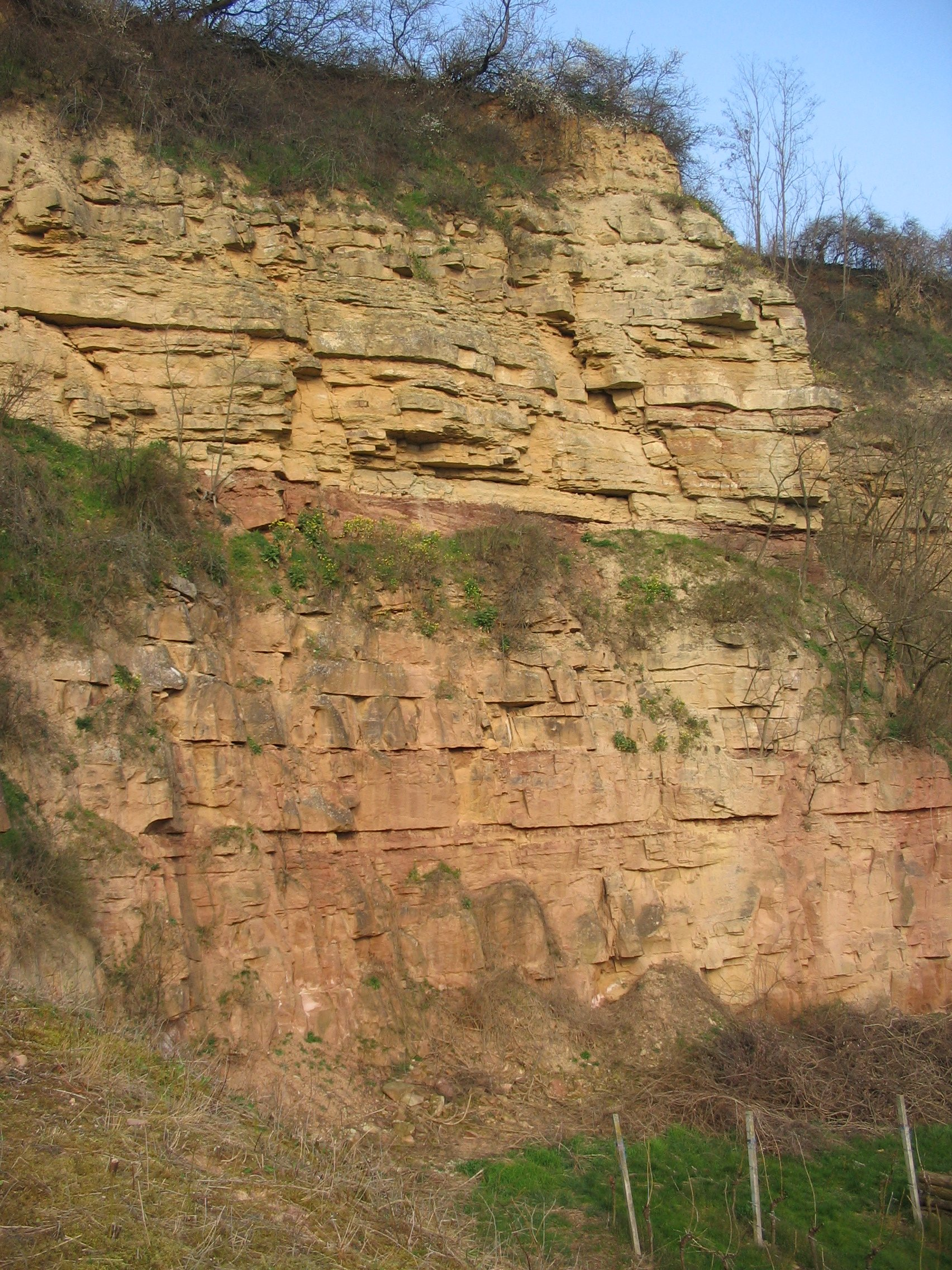
- The Grès à Voltzia in the Carrière Royale near Soultz-les-Bains
- Type: Formation
- Unit of: Upper Buntsandstein
- Sub-units: Grès à meules, Grès à argilleux, Grès coquillier
- Underlies: Grès coquillier
- Overlies: Couches intermédiaires
- Thickness: Over 20 metres

Lithology
- Primary: Sandstone
- Other: Clay, Silt, Dolomite

Location
- Country: France

The Grès à Voltzia is a geologic formation in France. It preserves fossils dating back to the Triassic period, more specifically the Anisian stage of the Middle Triassic epoch. It represents a lagerstatte that is well known for its palaeoflora, which shares numerous similarities with palaeobotanical assemblages in the Iberian Peninsula.

== Paleobiota ==
Color key
| Taxon | Reclassified taxon | Taxon falsely reported as present | Dubious taxon or junior synonym | Ichnotaxon | Ootaxon | Morphotaxon |

Notes
Uncertain or tentative taxa are in small text; ~~crossed out~~ taxa are discredited.

=== Arthropods ===
==== Insects ====
Insects
| Genus | Species | Higher taxon | Notes | Images |
|---|---|---|---|---|
| Anisinodus | A. crinitus | Chironomoidea | Earliest chironomoid known, fossils are all of larvae | |
| Archilimonia | A. vogesiana, A. grauvogeliana | Archilimoniinae (Limoniidae) | Formerly placed in its own family “Archilimonidae” | |
| Archostemata indet. | Unapplicable | Coleoptera | Represented by 32 distinct forms, but unfortunately none of these can be named at present as they are only represented by isolated elytra | |
| Arlecoris | A. louisi | Arlecorinae (Naucoroidea) | Earliest water bug known | |
| Baharellinus | B. umbrosus | Blattogryllidae (Grylloblattodea) | Has a dark wing membrane | |
| Chauliodites | C. aniscus | Chaulioditidae (Grylloblattida) | | |
| Dorniella | D. elcanoides, D. apectinata, D. diluta, D. ovalis | Blattogryllidae (Grylloblattodea) | Most diverse grylloblattodean from the formation | |
| Embigryllus | E. shcherbakovi | Blattogryllidae (Grylloblattodea) | | |
| Gallia | G. alsatica | Stem-Brachycera | Earliest brachyceran known | |
| Galliagryllavus | G. vogesiacus | Gryllavidae (Ensifera) | Similar to Gryllavus | |
| Grauvogelia | G. arzevilleriana | Grauvogeliidae (Diptera) | Placed in an entirely separate infraorder (Grauvogeliomorpha) within Diarchineura (synonymous with the modern, broader Psychodomorpha), oldest known fly at time of discovery | |
| Laurentiptera | L. gallica | Liassophilidae (Mecoptera) | Formerly placed in its own family “Laurentipteridae” | |
| Leaphis | L. primus | Creaphididae (Aphidomorpha) | Earliest aphid known, synonymous with the later named “Vosegus triassicus” | |
| Louisa | L. nova | Grauvogeliidae (Diptera) | Similar to Grauvogelia | |
| Megakhosarodes | M. vosgesicus | Megakhosaridae (Grylloblattodea) | Similar to the Permian M. zajsanicus | |
| Mesoplectopteron | M. longipes | Mesoplectopteridae (Ephemeroptera) | Redescribed in a 2005 paper | |
| Minorella | M. virgata | Ephemeroptera incertae sedis | Similar to modern Leptophlebiidae, but the fossils are not well-preserved enough for confident identification | |
| Palaeochresmoda | P. grauvogeli | Prochresmodidae (Phasmatodea) | Earliest known stick insect at the time | |
| Palaeomesorthopteron | P. pullus | Mesorthopteridae (Grylloblattodea) | Has dark wing membrane | |
| Prochoristella | P. pilosa | Permochoristidae (Mecoptera) | Named after the abundance of microchaetae on the wings | |
| Pseudopolycentropus | P. triassicus | Pseudopolycentropodidae | Earliest pseudopolycentropodid known | |
| Reisia | R. guillaumei | Triadotypidae (Odonatoptera) | Formerly placed in the genus “Triadotypus” | |
| Scleroblatta | S. densa | Argentinoblattidae (Blattodea) | Differentiated by a large costal vein | |
| Subioblatta | S. undulata | Subioblattidae (Blattodea) | Caused a redescription of Subioblattidae in its original paper | |
| Tanus | T. triassicus | Nadipteromorpha (Psychodomorpha) | Known from a fairly complete specimen, may be ancestral to Tanyderidae | |
| Toxodotes | T. coloratus | Toxodotidae (Ephemeroptera) | Has coloured wingtips | |
| Transitoblatta | T. reticulata | Mancusoblattidae (Blattodea) | Transitional between Paleozoic and Mesozoic cockroaches | |
| Triassodotes | T. vogesiacus | Misthodotidae (Ephemeroptera) | Similar to Misthodotes, but has shorter hind wings | |
| Triassoephemera | T. punctata | Triassoephemeridae (Ephemeroptera) | Unusually has an unflattened body and double claws, unlike all modern mayfly larvae | |
| Triassomanthus | T. parvulus | Triassomanthidae (Ephemeroptera) | Has long tusks like burrowing nymphs, but has legs not adapted for burrowing | |
| Triassonurus | T. doliiformis | Siphlonuridae | Oldest siphlonurid known | |
| Triassoparacyrtophyllites | T. bifurcatus | Tuphellidae (Hagloidea) | Similar to Paracyrtophyllites | |
| Triassophyllum | T. leopardii | Tettigoniidae | Oldest tettigoniid known | |
| Vogerhypha | V. blagoderovi, V. krzeminskorum | Protorhyphidae (Bibionomorpha) | Formerly placed in “Vymrhyphus” | |
| Vogesonympha | V. ludovici | Vogesonymphidae (Sinebranchia/Panephemeroptera) | Formerly classed as Pterygota incertae sedis, as it has a striking resemblance to Carbotriplura despite being vastly smaller | |
| Vosgesopterum | V. arzvillerensis | Blattogryllidae (Grylloblattodea) | | |
| Voltziaephemera | V. fossoria | Voltziaephemeridae (Ephemeroptera) | Likely a burrowing nymph, as evidenced by having tusks, but different from extant ones in its long and narrow wing pads | |
| Voltziahagla | V. pseudofurcatus | Haglidae | Similar to Archaboilus | |
| Voltzialestes | V. triasicus | Voltzialestidae (Protozygoptera) | First odonate from the formation | |
| Voltziapupa | V. cornuta, V. tentata | Grauvogeliidae? (Diptera) | Known from pupae | |

==== Misc. Arthropods ====
Misc. Arthropods
| Genus | Species | Higher taxon | Notes | Images |
|---|---|---|---|---|
| Anhelkocephalon | A. handlirschi | Cyclida | Formerly interpreted as an isopod | |
| Antrimpos | A. atavus | Penaeidae | A fairly widespread prawn genus | A. speciosus from Solnhofen |
| Apudites | A. antiquus | Calmanostraca (Branchiopoda) | Formerly placed within Triops cancriformis | Triops cancriformis, a modern species which Apudites was originally classed within |
| Clytiopsis | C. argentoratensis | Erymidae | Synonymised with two other species from the formation, which are likely larvae of this one | |
| Diaphanosoma | D. rare | Peracarida incertae sedis | Previously thought to be a larval decapod | |
| Euestheria | E. minuta minuta | Euestheriidae (Spinicaudata) | Shell valve resembles that of tellins in shape, formerly placed in the genus “Isaura” | |
| Euthycarcinus | E. kessleri | Euthycarcinoidea | First euthycarcinoid described, alongside the youngest and one of the most well-preserved | Diagrammatic reconstruction of E. kessleri |
| Galloscorpio | G. voltzi | Galloscorpionidae (Scorpiones) | One of the youngest known scorpions from an extinct superfamily | |
| Grauvogelocaris | G. alsatica | Stem-Diplostraca | Resembles the Cambrian Rehbachiella somewhat in its combination of a carapace covering the head/thorax and a long abdomen | |
| Halicyne | H. ornata | Cyclida | Similar to Anhelkocephalon | |
| Hannibaliulus | H. wilsonae | Callipodida? | One of the few Mesozoic millipede fossils | |
| Limulitella | L. bronni | Limulidae? | One of the few freshwater horseshoe crabs known | |
| Olesenocaris | O. grauvogeli | Stem-Diplostraca? | Resembles the Cambrian Rehbachiella somewhat in its combination of a carapace covering the head/thorax and a long abdomen | |
| Palaega | P. pumila | Flabellifera | Had strong mandibles, likely carnivorous | |
| Palaeolimnadia | P. alsatica | Limnadiidae | Bears two different egg types; one larger and one smaller | |
| Palaeolimnadiopsis | P. dictyonata | Limnadiopsidae (Conchostraca) | Relatively large, over 1 cm long | |
| Praeleaia | P. sp | Leaiidae (Conchostraca) | Also similar to Estheriella | |
| Protobuthus | P. elegans | Protobuthidae (Buthoidea) | Earliest known buthoid scorpion | Holotype fossil of P. elegans |
| Rosamygale | R. grauvogeli | Hexathelidae | Oldest known mygalomorph spider | |
| Schimperella | S. beneckei, S. kessleri | Mysida | Differs from modern mysids in the lack of uropod statocysts | |
| Triasocaris | T. peachi | Syncarida | Indeterminate family | |
| Triassinella | T. aff. tsorfatia | Glorianellidae (Podocopida) | Fairly small, only around 0.75 mm long | |

=== Misc. Invertebrates ===
Misc. Invertebrates
| Genus | Species | Higher taxon | Notes | Images |
|---|---|---|---|---|
| Enantiostreon | E. difforme | Prospondylidae (Pectinida) | Formerly placed within Terquemiidae | |
| Entolium | E. discites | Entoliidae | Specimens vary in size between different localities | |
| Eunicites | E. triasicus | Leodicidae (Errantia) | Likely quite tolerant to salinity variations similar to modern eunicids | |
| Hoernesia | H. sp | Bakevelliidae | Also similar to Gervillia, but too poorly preserved to identify further | |
| Homaphrodite | H. speciosa | Aphroditidae | Also resembles polynoids | |
| Homomya | H. impressa, H. albertii | Pholadomyidae | Likely a burrower | |
| Lingula | L. tenuissima | Lingulidae | Lingula is a common example of a “living fossil”, however recent evidence suggests this is a result of misidentification | L. tenussima fossil from the Muschelkalk |
| Loxonema | L. obsoletum | Loxonematidae | Similar to L. detritum | Loxonema sp. fossil |
| Modiolus | M. sp. | Mytilida | Similar to M. triquetra, but longer | The extant species Modiolus modiolus |
| Myophoria | M. vulgaris | Trigoniida | Likely lived in muddy sediment like other trigoniids | |
| Naticopsis | N. gaillardoti | Neritopsidae | Most specimens are flattened in various planes | Naticopsis fossil from Italy |
| Pleuromya | P. elongata | Pleuromyidae (Myida) | Likely a burrower | |
| Progonionemus | P. vogesiacus | Limnomedusae | One of the oldest freshwater hydrozoans known | Reconstructions of Progonionemus as an adult and juvenile |
| ”Spirorbis” | S. pusillus | Serpulidae | Poorly preserved, despite another species assigned to the genus being common in the Muschelkalk | |
| Triadonereis | T. sp | Annelida incertae sedis | Incompletely preserved, so its assignment to the genus is only provisional | |
| Undularia | U. scalata | Protorculidae | Formerly placed in “Ptenoglossa” | |
| Velata | V. albertii | Pectinidae | Formerly placed in “Eopecten” | |

=== Vertebrates ===
Vertebrates
| Genus | Species | Higher taxon | Notes | Images |
|---|---|---|---|---|
| Dipteronotus | D. aculeatus | Perleidiformes | Formerly placed within “Praesemionotus” | D. aculeatus fossil |
| Dorsolepis | D. virgatus | Platysomidae (Palaeonisciformes) | While the body is well-preserved and similar to other platysomids, the head is barely known | |
| Eocyclotosaurus | E. lehmani | Heylerosauridae | Formerly placed in Stenotosaurus | Reconstruction of E. wellesi |
| Mastodonsauridae indet. | Unapplicable | Mastodonsauroidea | Formerly classed as “Odontosaurus voltzii”, then moved into “Mastodonsaurus” vaslenensis before finally being removed from a genus altogether | |
| Mirasaura | M. grauvogeli | Drepanosauromorpha | Related to the enigmatic Longisquama from the Madygen Formation | Reconstructed skull of Mirasaura based on μCT scans |
| Pericentrophorus | P. minimus | Semionotiformes | Resembles Acentrophorus, originally placed as a “transitional form” between Chondrostei and Holostei | P. minimus fossil |
| Saurichthys | S. daubreei | Saurichthyidae | Similar to Saurichthys lepidosteoides from the Muschelkalk | Saurichthys curionii fossil from the Middle Triassic of Monte San Giorgio, Switzerland |

== See also ==
- List of fossiliferous stratigraphic units in France
