= Cycloid (disambiguation) =

A cycloid is a curve traced by a rolling circle. "Cycloid" can also refer to:

- Cyclida (formerly Cycloidea), an order of prehistoric crustaceans
- Cycloid scale, a type of scale seen on some fishes
- Cycloid-β and Cycloid-γ, characters in the Street Fighter games
- Cycloids, a fictional, hostile alien race introduced in Duke Nukem 3D
