= Meyerosuchus =

Meyerosuchus Temporal range: Early Triassic

Scientific classification
- Kingdom: Animalia
- Phylum: Chordata
- Clade: Tetrapoda
- Order: †Temnospondyli
- Suborder: †Stereospondyli
- Clade: †Capitosauria
- Family: †Stenotosauridae
- Genus: †Meyerosuchus; Ochev, 1966

Species
- †M. fuerstenberganus (Meyer, 1855) (type)

Extinct genus of temnospondyls

Meyerosuchus is an extinct genus of mastodonsauroidean temnospondyl. Fossils have been found from the Early Triassic Hardegsen Formation in southern Germany. Meyerosuchus is present in late Olenekian deposits of the Middle Buntsandstein. The type species M. fuerstenberganus was named in 1966, although remains have been known since 1855. Meyerosuchus is closely related to Stenotosaurus; both genera are grouped in the family Stenotosauridae and the two genera may even be synonymous.
