= M. inornatus =

M. inornatus may refer to:

- Mermessus inornatus, a money spider species in the genus Mermessus
- Micropterix inornatus, a moth species in the genus Micropterix
- Modisimus inornatus, a house spider species in the genus Modisimus
- Myiophobus inornatus, a bird species

== See also ==
- Inornatus
