= Consteniusi =

Consteniusi Temporal range: Middle Eocene 46 Ma

Scientific classification
- Domain: Eukaryota
- Kingdom: Animalia
- Phylum: Arthropoda
- Subphylum: Chelicerata
- Class: Arachnida
- Order: Araneae
- Infraorder: Araneomorphae
- Family: Araneidae
- Genus: †Consteniusi; Downen & Selden, 2020
- Species: †C. leonae

Binomial name
- †Consteniusi leonae Downen & Selden, 2020

Genus of spiders (fossil)

Consteniusi is an extinct genus of orbweavers in the family Araneidae. There is only one species in this genus, Consteniusi leonae, or Leona's Spider, who was named after the mother of Kurt Constenius, Leona. Its holotype is discovered in the Kishenehn Formation of Montana, United States in 2020.

== Etymology ==
C.leonaes holotype specimen is CM 56099, a part of female adult as a fossil discovered by Kurt Constenius and was donated by Leona Constenius, Kurt's mother for study. It was first published in "Fossil spiders (Araneae) from the Eocene Kishenehn Formation of Montana, USA" by Matt Downen and Paul A. Selden along with Greenwaltarachne pamelae.
