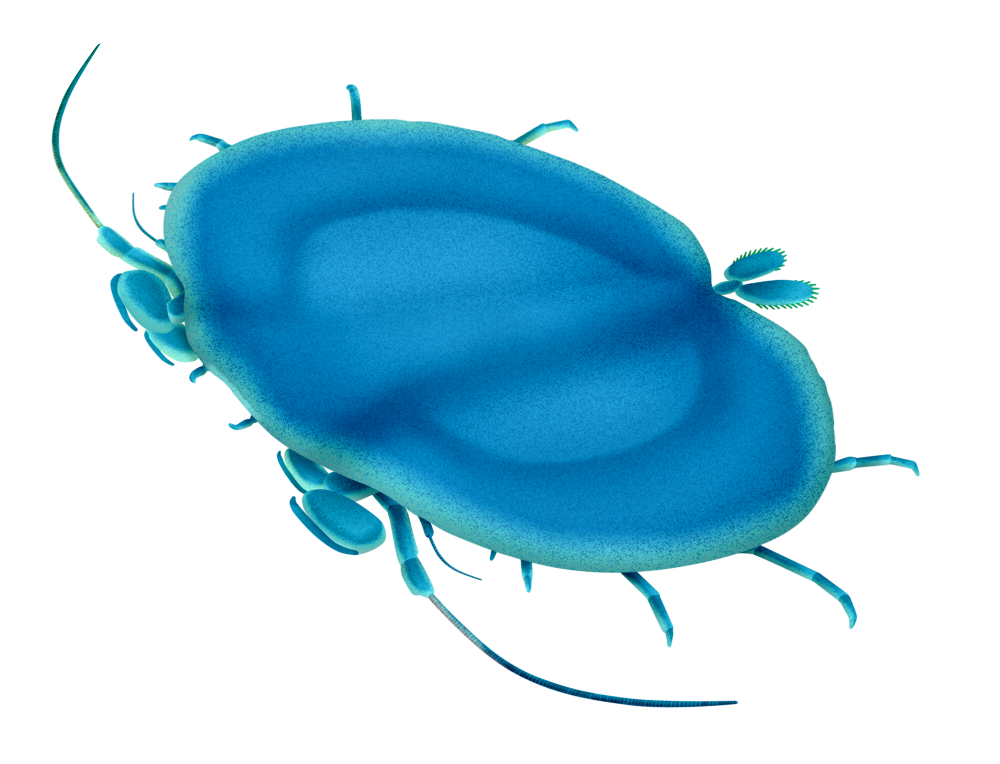
- Brittaniclus rankini

Scientific classification
- Kingdom: Animalia
- Phylum: Arthropoda
- Clade: Pancrustacea
- Order: †Cyclida
- Family: †Americlidae
- Genus: †Brittaniclus; Schweitzer et al., 2020

Type species
- †B. rankini Woodward, 1868

Other species
- †B. scotti Woodward, 1893; †B. testudo Peach, 1882

= Brittaniclus =

Brittaniclus Temporal range: Visean–Moscovian

Extinct genus of arthropods

Brittaniclus is an extinct genus of cyclidan crustaceans that lived during the Carboniferous period. Fossils belonging to this genus have been discovered in Scotland, England and Ukraine. Three species are currently accepted within the genus Brittaniclus: B. rankini, B. scotti and B. testudo.

== History and species ==
The type species, B. rankini, was originally described as Cyclus rankini by Woodward in 1868. It was discovered in the Serpukhovian Limestone Coal Formation in Scotland. The unit where B. rankini was discovered comprises finely laminated shales, it is called the 'Shrimp Member'. The species was recombined as Americlus rankini by Feldmann and Schweitzer in 2019. A. rankini was redescribed by Clark et al. in 2020. Later in 2020, Schweitzer et al. created the genus Brittaniclus for A. rankini and two other species.

B. scotti was initially described as a species of the genus Cyclus by Woodward in 1893. Fossils belonging to that species have been found in rocks dating back to the Moscovian in the Pennine Middle Coal Measures Formation in England. In 1925, Hopwood separated C. scotti from Cyclus and classified it within the genus Halicyne. However, other authors disagreed with the criteria defined by Hopwood to separate Cyclus and Halicyne and kept C. scotti in the genus Cyclus. In 2008, Dzik created the genus Americlus for a group of "Cyclus" species characterized by a flat carapace, creating the combination A. scotti. It was reused by later authors. Like B. rankini; A. scotti was placed in the new genus Brittaniclus by Schweitzer et al. in 2020.

A fragmentary carapace impression discovered in the Bashkirian Mospyne Formation in Luhansk Oblast, Ukraine, was attributed to B. cf. scotti by Dernov in 2022.

Another species, B. johnsoni, was initially described as Cyclus johnsoni by Woodward in 1894 It has also been successively reclassified in the genera Halicyne, Cyclus, Americlus and Brittaniclus. It is known from the same unit as B. scotti. Schweitzer et al. synonymized this species with B. scotti in 2020.

B. testudo was described by Peach in 1882 as a species of the genus Cyclus. It has been discovered in the Viséan Tyne Limestone Formation in Scotland. Feldmann and Schweitzer attributed the species to the genus Americlus. Like B. rankini and B. scotti, A. testudo was placed in the new genus Brittaniclus by Schweitzer et al. in 2020.

B. mckenzii was named by Easterday in 2004 as Lophoops mckenzii. It was thought to be a horseshoe crab. It has been discovered in the Missourian Glenshaw Formation in Ohio. Dernov identified the species as a cyclidan and created the new combination Brittaniclus mckenzii in 2022, this was only based on the pictures and descriptions provided in Easterday's thesis. In 2025, Schweitzer et al. pointed out the fact that Easterday's thesis did not match the article 8.1.3 of the International Commission on Zoological Nomenclature: the thesis had initially only been produced as a hard copy for The Ohio State University. Because of this reason, Schweitzer et al. did not consider Easterday's thesis a published work and so they proposed the new genus and species names Ohioclus columbianensis.

== Description ==
Diagram of Brittaniclus rankini in ventral view

B. rankini has an ovate carapace. It is wider than long. The rostral lobe (slightly prominent lobe at the front of the carapace) is weakly convex. The carapace is bilobate with a longitudinal axial lobe that extends into a thin keel toward the posterior end. The marginal rim of the carapace is separated from the central part by a thin keel. The surface of the carapace bears small pits or tubercles. There is a small notch at the posterior end of the carapace. There are at least seven thoracic somites, possibly sternites, on the ventral side. At the lateral edge of each sternite are two ovate structures, they might have been openings for the appendages. Most sternites sutures terminate at a central ovate structure. Posteriorly to this central structure is another structure which may be the abdomen, it composed of three to four segments. The posterior end of the body bears two caudal rami. Male gonopods have also been identified on some fossils. The antennules are composed of at least three basal articles and a ling flagellum. The antennae are much shorter and narrower. Eight pairs of appendages are preserved: the first and second pairs are interpreted as maxillae. Each appendage of both pairs is composed of five segments. The first pair is much smaller than the second pair, the articles become shorter and more slender distally. The median articles of the second pair are wider, the last articles are narrow and sharp. The third pair is interpreted as maxillipeds. Their general shape is similar to that of the second pair. However; they are slightly larger and there might be a sixth short and sharp article. Posterior to the maxillipeds are five pairs of narrow thoracic appendages. The number of thoracic appendages does not correspond the number of sternites: this could be explained by several hypotheses: the second maxillae could be the maxillipeds, the gonopods could be the appendages of the last sternite or the last sternites could simply have had no appendages.

B. scotti differs from the other Brittaniclus species in having very distinct, well marqued lobes (swollen parts of the carapace (bulges)) and concentric keels. The rostral lobe is more developed too. No appendages other than the antennae have been preserved.

Fossils belonging to B. testudo are not very well preserved. However, they show diagnostic features of Brittaniclus such as a small (few mm to 1 cm long) rounded carapace with a projected rostral lobe, a wide marginal rim, well developed sternites and a strong axial keel.

== Paleoecology ==
B. rankini is thought to have inhabited a mostly land locked basin connected to the open ocean. It would have been generally poorly oxygenated and brackish. B. scotti and B. testudo are also known from marine deposits. Not much is known of about life habits of cyclidans, it has been suggested that they were parasitic based on a supposed affinity with branchiurans. However, the size of cyclidans and the presence of claw-like appendages do not support this hypothesis. It is more likely that cyclidans were free-living animals.
