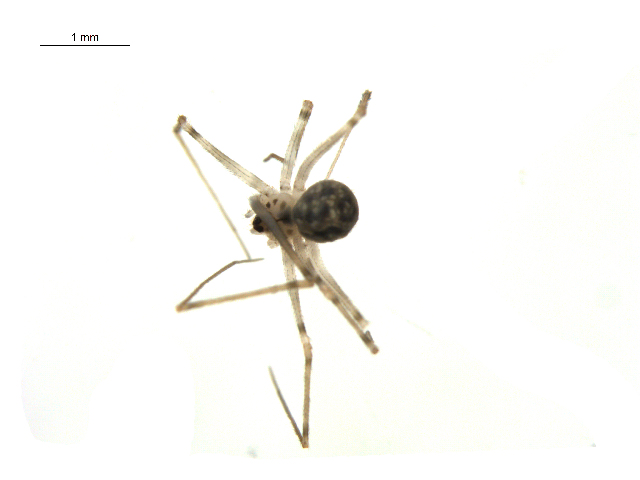
- Modisimus culicinus

Scientific classification
- Kingdom: Animalia
- Phylum: Arthropoda
- Subphylum: Chelicerata
- Class: Arachnida
- Order: Araneae
- Infraorder: Araneomorphae
- Family: Pholcidae
- Genus: Modisimus
- Species: M. culicinus

Binomial name
- Modisimus culicinus (Simon, 1893)

= Modisimus culicinus =

Species of spider

Modisimus culicinus is a species of cellar spider in the family Pholcidae. It is found in South America, has been introduced into Germany, the Czech Republic, Zaire, the Seychelles, Sri Lanka, Indonesia, China, Australia, and Pacific islands.
