= Dorsolepis =

Dorsolepis Temporal range: early Anisian

Scientific classification
- Domain: Eukaryota
- Kingdom: Animalia
- Phylum: Chordata
- Class: Actinopterygii
- Order: †Palaeonisciformes
- Genus: †Dorsolepis; Jörg, 1969
- Species: †D. virgatus

Binomial name
- †Dorsolepis virgatus Jörg, 1969

Extinct genus of fishes

Dorsolepis is an extinct genus of prehistoric marine ray-finned fish that lived during the early Anisian age (Middle Triassic epoch) in what is now France (Alsace) and Germany (Baden-Württemberg). Fossils were found in the Grès à Voltzia in Alsace and in the Buntsandstein in Baden-Württemberg.

== See also ==
- Prehistoric fish
- List of prehistoric bony fish
