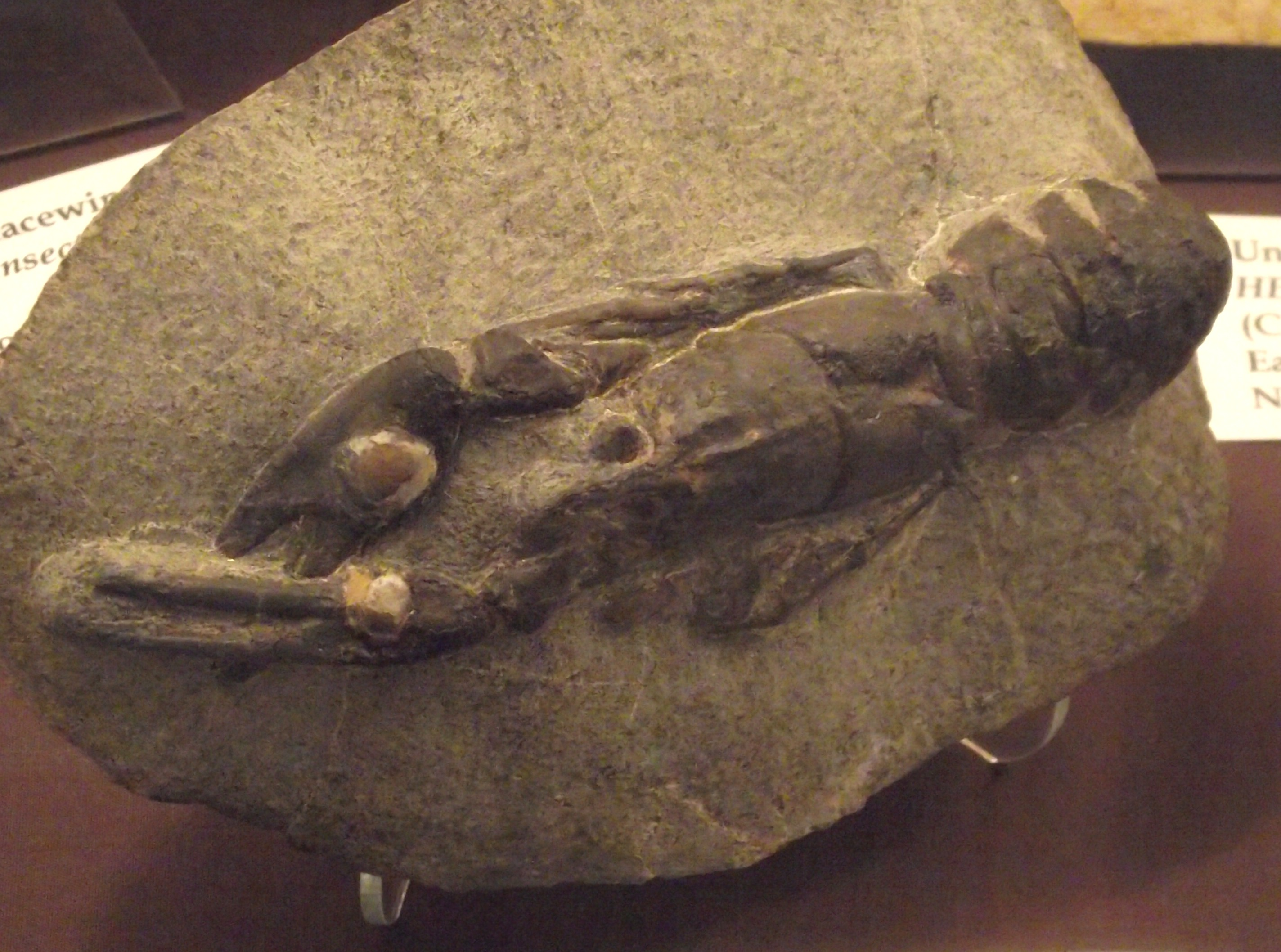
- H. bearpawensis at San Diego County Fair

Scientific classification
- Kingdom: Animalia
- Phylum: Arthropoda
- Class: Malacostraca
- Order: Decapoda
- Suborder: Pleocyemata
- Family: Nephropidae
- Genus: †Hoploparia; M’Coy, 1849

Type species
- Astacus longimanus Sowerby, 1826

= Hoploparia =

Hoploparia Temporal range: Jurassic–Paleogene

Extinct genus of lobsters

Hoploparia is a genus of fossil lobster belonging to the family Nephropidae. The type species of this genus is Hoploparia longimana.

These epifaunal carnivores lived from the Jurassic to the Paleogene period (from 201.6 to 28.4 Ma). Fossils of this genus have been found in sediments of Europe, Argentina, Madagascar, Canada, the United States, and Antarctica.

== Taxonomy ==
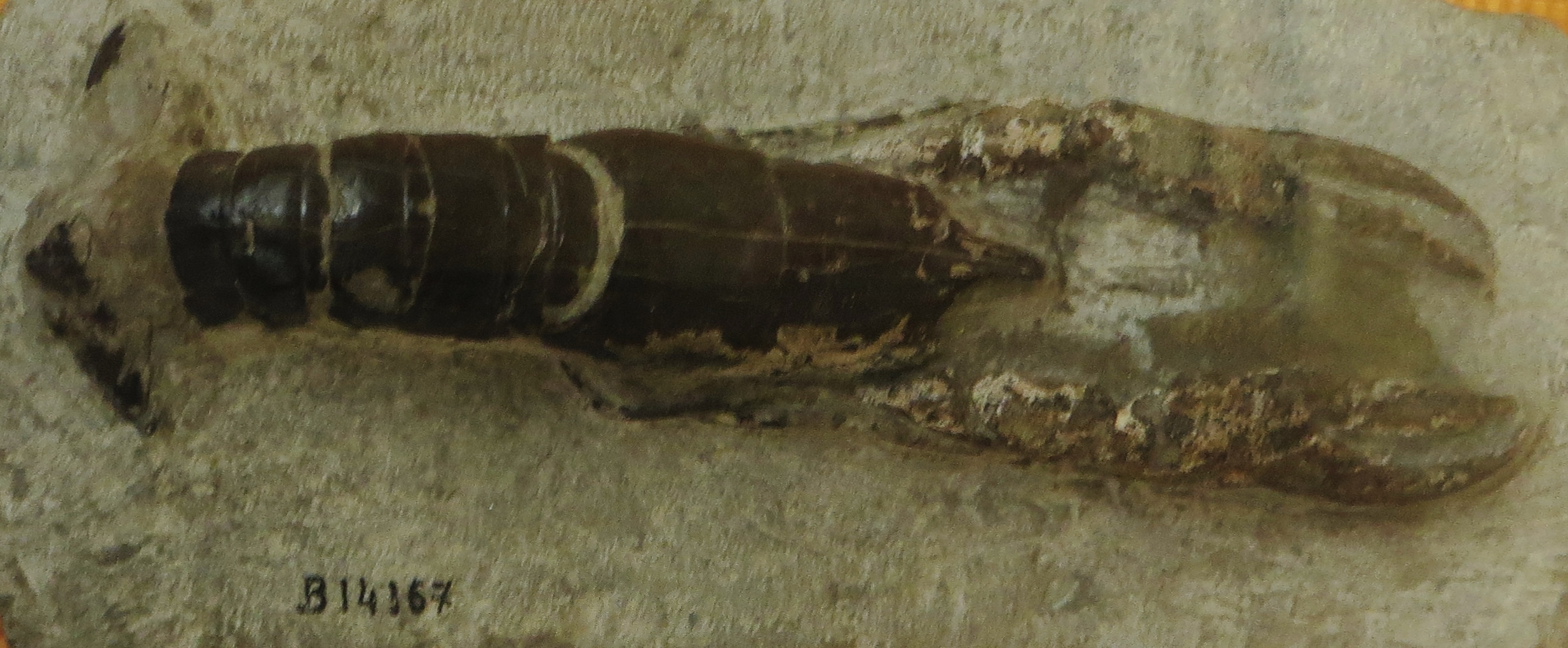
H. longimana from United Kingdom, on display at Galerie de paléontologie et d'anatomie comparée in Paris

A number of species have been described or placed within Hoploparia

- H. albertaensis Tshudy, 2005
- H. alpinus Van Straelen, 1936
- H. anomala Rathbun, 1935
- H. antarctica Wilckens, 1907
- H. aspera Harbort, 1905
- H. bearpawensis Feldmann et al., 1977
- H. belli McCoy, 1849
- H. benedeni Pelseneer, 1886
- H. beyrichi Schluter, 1862
- H. biserialis Fritsch and Kafka, 1887
- H. blossomana Rathbun, 1935
- H. buntingi Feldmann and Holland, 1971
- H. calcarifera Schluter, 1879
- H. catalunica Garassino et al., 2009
- H. collignoni Van Straelen, 1949
- H. columbiana Beurlen, 1938
- H. corneti Van Straelen, 1921
- H. dentata Roemer, 1841
- H. dentonensis Rathbun, 1935
- H. edwardsi Robineae-Desvoidy, 1849
- H. eocenica Lorenthey, 1929
- H. falcifer Fritsch and Kafka, 1887
- H. fraasi Bohm, 1891
- H. gabbi Pilsbry, 1901
- H. gadzicki Feldmann and Crame, 1998
- H. gammaroides McCoy, 1849
- H. georgeana Rathbun, 1935
- H. gladiator Pilsbry, 1901
- H. groenlandica Ravn, 1903
- H. hakelensis Fraas, 1878
- H. hemprichi Merin, 1941
- H. heterodon Bosquet, 1854
- H. horrida Schweitzer and Feldmann, 2003
- H. intermedia Secretan, 1964
- H. johnsoni Rathbun, 1935
- H. kamimurai Kato and Karasawa, 2006
- H. kamuy Karasawa and Hayakawa, 2000
- H. klebsi Noetling, 1885
- H. lehmanni Haas, 1889
- H. longimana Sowerby, 1826
- H. mcnairyensis Rathbun, 1926
- H. mesembria Etheridge Jr, 1917
- H. minima Tribolet, 1876
- H. miyamotoi Karasawa, 1998
- H. munchki Pelseneer, 1886
- H. natsumiae Karasawa et al., 2008
- H. nephropiformis Schluter, 1879
- H. percyi Beneden, 1872
- H. perseneeri Van Straelen, 1936
- H. pusilla Secretan, 1964
- H. riddlensis Feldmann, 1974
- H. saxbi McCoy, 1849
- H. scabra Bell, 1863
- H. schluteri Tribolet, 1876
- H. sculpta Secretan, 1964
- H. senonensis Forir, 1887
- H. shastensis Rathbun, 1929
- H. stokesi Weller, 1903
- H. suecica Schluter, 1879
- H. sulcicauda Schluter, 1879
- H. tennesseensis Rathbun and Wade, 1926
- H. triboleti Borrisiak, 1904
- H. trigeri Milne & Edwards, 1886
- H. tshudyi Schweitzer & Feldmann, 2001
- H. uzbekensis Feldmann, 2001
- H. victoriae Quayle, 1987
- H. wardi Quayle, 1987

== Hoploparia benedeni ==
Hoploparia benedeni is known from Cretaceous rocks in northern France and was first described in 1886 by Paul Pelseneer.

=== Stratigraphy ===
The type specimen was discovered in 1868 near Grandpré, Ardennes, France, and collected by M. F. L. Cornet. It was found in a phosphatic nodule in greensand deposits of Albian age.

=== History and classification ===
The species was originally described by Paul Pelseneer in an 1886 article in the Bulletin du Musée royal d'histoire naturelle de Belgique, entitled "Notice sur un crustacé des sables verts de Grandpré" ("Report of a crustacean from the green sands of Grandpré"). The specific epithet commemorates Professor Pierre-Joseph van Beneden, who donated the specimen to Pelseneer for study.

==== Description ====
The specimen is nearly complete. The tail fan (telson and uropods) and many of the thoracic appendages are not visible, but two large claws are well preserved. The length of the specimen, from the rostrum to the tail is 35 mm (1.4 in) – of which 10 mm (0.4 in) is the rostrum – and the animal has a maximum width of 15 mm (0.6 in). Since the proportions of lobsters change little as they grow, it is impossible to say whether the specimen is a juvenile or an adult. Pelseneer originally placed the species in the genus Hoploparia, rather than the closely related genus Homarus, because the rostrum was not adorned with lateral spines. It was later considered part of the genus Homarus as the relationship between the two genera was reassessed, but has since been restored to Hoploparia.

== Hoploparia stokesi ==
Hoploparia stokesi was the first arthropod fossil described from Antarctica. It was part of a small collection of fossils found by the artist Frank Wilbert Stokes on Snow Hill Island, on the Antarctic Peninsula. The single lobster specimen in the collection was named Glyphaea stokesi by Stuart Weller in 1903. The species was later transferred to Hoploparia. Since its first discovery, several hundred specimens of H. stokesi have been collected from islands in the James Ross Basin area, especially from Seymour Island. The species ranges from the Cretaceous (Campanian-Maastrichtian) to the Paleogene (Paleocene).

== Hoploparia tshudyi ==
Hoploparia tshudyi is known from Cretaceous sediments exposed in the Wrangell Mountains of Alaska. The species was described by Carrie E. Schweitzer and Rodney M. Feldmann in 2001.

=== Stratigraphy ===
The known fossil was collected by J. M. Tropp from strata of the Moonshine Creek Formation exposed in Contact Gulch of the Wrangell Mountains, Alaska. Based on the palyostratigraphy the exposure is suggested to date to the latest Albian in age, and lithography of the site indicates an openwater depositional environment on the continental shelf.
