= Anhelkocephalon =

Anhelkocephalon Temporal range: Anisian

Scientific classification
- Kingdom: Animalia
- Phylum: Arthropoda
- Clade: Pancrustacea
- Superclass: Multicrustacea
- Order: †Cyclida
- Genus: †Anhelkocephalon; Bill, 1914
- Species: †A. handlirschi

Binomial name
- †Anhelkocephalon handlirschi Bill, 1914

Triassic genus of crustaceans

Anhelkocephalon is an extinct genus of cyclidan crustaceans. It was found in the Anisian (middle Triassic) Grès à Voltzia Formation from eastern France.

== Discovery and history ==
The holotype was found in the Grès à Meules unit of the Grès à Voltzia. The Grès à Meules is made of fine grained sandstones mixed with laminated clay and silt lenses and layers of calcareous sandstone and sandy dolomites. It was first described as an isopod from the extant genus Serolis because of its reduced abdomen, large telson and head structure, but this interpretation is outdated.

Unfortunately, the holotype was destroyed in a fire in 1967, however a neotype and a paraneotype were designated from the same formation in 1984. Another specimen was attributed to this species since. Lastly it was reevaluated in 2020 as a member of Cyclida.

== Description ==
Description of the neotype SMNS 75641, which is not very well preserved, according to Schädel et al. (2020):

- A bilateral body with a total of six visible pairs of articulated appendages, including two pairs of anterior appendages, which may represent antennae, and four pairs of walking or grasping appendages. The body width increases towards the posterior-most pair of appendages and then decreases posteriorly.
- The antennules of the first pair are small and divided into a peduncle composed of at least two segments, with a dense fringe of setae on the proximal segment, and a narrow distal flagellum. No segmentation is visible on the flagellum, but this may be due to poor preservation.
- The second pair, interpreted as antennae, is organized in a similar way: a proximal peduncular region composed of at least three segments bearing setae, and a long flagellum composed of at least 21 elements.
- The eight posterior appendages are all composed of five segments.
- The shield is roughly circular, about 18 mm long and 22.7 mm wide. The posterior margin exhibits a pair of lobes, each composed of two large parts surrounding a smaller, almost circular part. It shows a net-like pattern of thin lines. It also bears a Y-shaped structure composed of five elements: two pairs of oblique keel-like bulges converging towards a fifth anterior midline bulge.
- Two pairs of gill-like structures are also present. This large sclerite is located posterior to the walking appendages in the fossil, but this was probably not its original position in life.
- The specimen SMNS 75641-3 also shows a rounded sclerite with a clear net-like pattern. This specimen is about 16 mm long.

== Affinities ==
The classification of Anhelkocephalon as an isopod is not tenable because of the large round sclerite. Even if some isopods show a circular body plan, it is often achieved by broadened distinct tergites and not one single big sclerite. Moreover, the margin lobes were originally thought to be uropods but they are actually part of the shield itself.

On the other hand, a large circular sclerite is typical of cyclidan. The most conspicuous resemblance with cyclidans is the "Y"-shaped bulge structure on the shield.
It is not excluded that the original specimen was a different species.

== Ecology ==
The sedimentary deposits where Anhelkocephalon was found likely represent a benthic, brackish or freshwater deltaic environment. It probably lived alongside the other cyclidan Halicyne.
