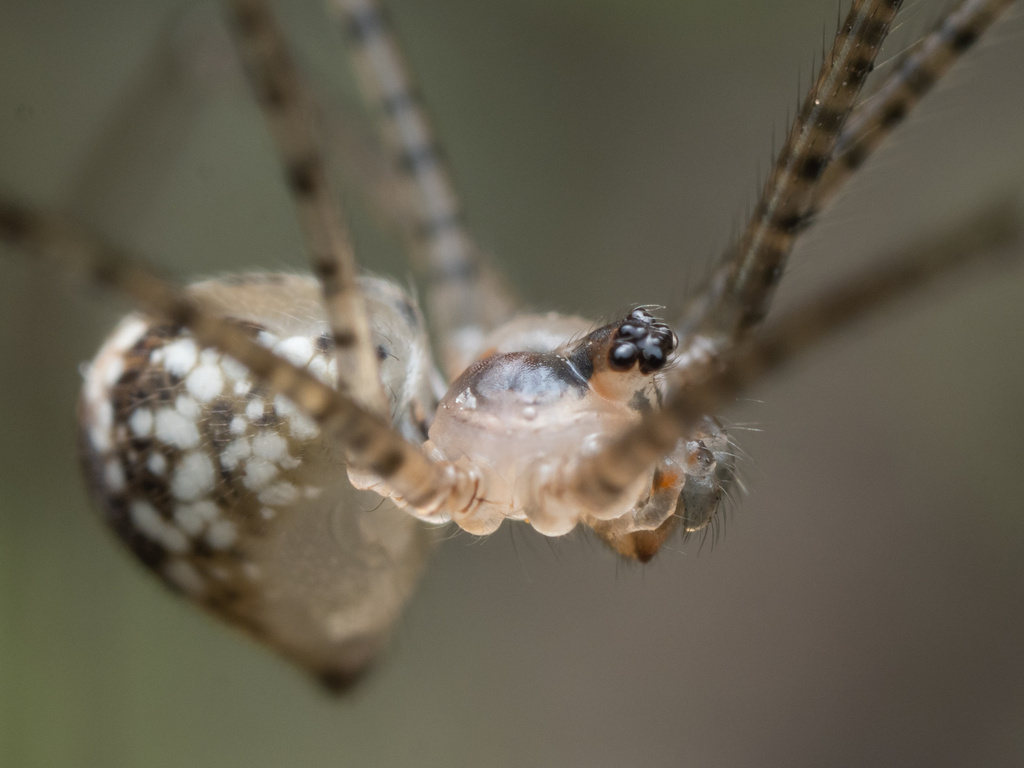
- Modisimus texanus

Scientific classification
- Kingdom: Animalia
- Phylum: Arthropoda
- Subphylum: Chelicerata
- Class: Arachnida
- Order: Araneae
- Infraorder: Araneomorphae
- Family: Pholcidae
- Genus: Modisimus; Simon, 1893

Type species
- M. glaucus Simon, 1893

Species
- 83, see text

Synonyms
- Bryantina Brignoli, 1985; Hedypsilus Simon, 1893; Platnicknia Özdikmen & Demir, 2009

= Modisimus =

Modisimus Temporal range: Neogene– Present

Genus of spiders

Modisimus is a genus of cellar spiders that was first described by Eugène Louis Simon in 1893.

== Description ==
Spiders of the genus Modisimus have six eyes, unlike the eight typical of spiders. While some other pholcid genera also have six eyes, Modisimus differs from them in the prosoma having a median furrow and the eyes being situated on a turret (this turret is very high in males).

== Species ==
As of June 2019 it contains eighty-three species and one subspecies, found in Central America, Europe, Asia, North America, the Caribbean, South America, Australia, on the Seychelles, and the Pacific Islands:

- M. angulatus Huber & Fischer, 2010 – Hispaniola
- M. bachata Huber & Fischer, 2010 – Hispaniola
- M. beneficus Gertsch, 1973 – Mexico
- M. berac Huber, 2010 – Hispaniola
- M. boneti Gertsch, 1971 – Mexico
- M. bribri Huber, 1998 – Costa Rica, Panama
- M. cahuita Huber, 1998 – Costa Rica
- M. caldera Huber, 1998 – Panama
- M. cavaticus Petrunkevitch, 1929 – Puerto Rico
- M. chiapa Gertsch, 1977 – Mexico
- M. chickeringi Gertsch, 1973 – Panama
- M. cienaga Huber & Fischer, 2010 – Hispaniola
- M. coco Huber, 1998 – Costa Rica
- M. coeruleolineatus Petrunkevitch, 1929 – Puerto Rico
- M. concolor Bryant, 1940 – Cuba
- M. cornutus Kraus, 1955 – Honduras
- M. coxanus (Bryant, 1940) – Cuba
- M. cuadro Huber & Fischer, 2010 – Hispaniola
- M. culicinus (Simon, 1893) – South America. Introduced to Germany, Czech Rep., Zaire, Seychelles, Sri Lanka, Indonesia, China, Australia, Pacific Is.
- M. david Huber, 1997 – Nicaragua, Panama
- M. deltoroi Valdez-Mondragón & Francke, 2009 – Mexico
- M. dilutus Gertsch, 1941 – Panama
- M. dominical Huber, 1998 – Costa Rica
- M. elevatus Bryant, 1940 – Cuba
- M. elongatus Bryant, 1940 – Cuba
- M. enriquillo Huber & Fischer, 2010 – Hispaniola
- M. epepye Huber, 2010 – Hispaniola
- M. femoratus Bryant, 1948 – Hispaniola
- M. fuscus Bryant, 1948 – Hispaniola
- M. glaucus Simon, 1893 (type) – Hispaniola, St. Vincent
- M. globosus Schmidt, 1956 – Colombia
- M. gracilipes Gertsch, 1973 – Guatemala
- M. guatuso Huber, 1998 – Nicaragua to Panama
- M. guerrerensis Gertsch & Davis, 1937 – Mexico
- M. incertus (Bryant, 1940) – Cuba
- M. inornatus O. Pickard-Cambridge, 1895 – Mexico
- M. iviei Gertsch, 1973 – Mexico
- M. ixobel Huber, 1998 – Guatemala
- M. jima Huber & Fischer, 2010 – Hispaniola
- M. kiskeya Huber & Fischer, 2010 – Hispaniola
- M. leprete Huber, 2010 – Hispaniola
- M. macaya Huber & Fischer, 2010 – Hispaniola
- M. maculatipes O. Pickard-Cambridge, 1895 – Mexico
- M. madreselva Huber, 1998 – Costa Rica
- M. makandal Huber & Fischer, 2010 – Hispaniola
- M. mango Huber, 2010 – Hispaniola
- M. mariposas Huber & Fischer, 2010 – Hispaniola
- M. mckenziei Gertsch, 1971 – Mexico
- M. minima (González-Sponga, 2009) – Venezuela
- M. miri Huber & Fischer, 2010 – Hispaniola
- M. mitchelli Gertsch, 1971 – Mexico
- M. modicus (Gertsch & Peck, 1992) – Ecuador (Galapagos Is.)
- M. montanus Petrunkevitch, 1929 – Puerto Rico
  - Modisimus m. dentatus Petrunkevitch, 1929 – Puerto Rico
- M. nicaraguensis Huber, 1998 – Nicaragua
- M. ovatus Bryant, 1940 – Cuba
- M. palenque Gertsch, 1977 – Mexico
- M. palvet Huber & Fischer, 2010 – Hispaniola
- M. pana Huber, 1998 – Guatemala
- M. paraiso Huber, 2010 – Hispaniola
- M. pavidus Bryant, 1940 – Cuba
- M. pelejil Huber & Fischer, 2010 – Hispaniola
- M. pittier Huber, 1998 – Costa Rica, Panama
- M. propinquus O. Pickard-Cambridge, 1896 – Mexico
- M. pulchellus Banks, 1929 – Panama
- M. pusillus Gertsch, 1971 – Mexico
- M. rainesi Gertsch, 1971 – Mexico
- M. reddelli Gertsch, 1971 – Mexico
- M. roumaini Huber, 2010 – Hispaniola
- M. sanpedro Jiménez & Palacios-Cardiel, 2015 – Mexico
- M. sanvito Huber, 1998 – Costa Rica
- M. sarapiqui Huber, 1998 – Costa Rica
- M. seguin Huber & Fischer, 2010 – Hispaniola
- M. selvanegra Huber, 1998 – Nicaragua
- M. sexoculatus Petrunkevitch, 1929 – Puerto Rico
- M. signatus (Banks, 1914) – Puerto Rico
- M. simoni Huber, 1997 – Venezuela
- M. solus Gertsch & Peck, 1992 – Ecuador (Galapagos Is.)
- M. texanus Banks, 1906 – USA, Mexico
- M. tiburon Huber & Fischer, 2010 – Hispaniola
- M. toma Huber & Fischer, 2010 – Hispaniola
- M. tortuguero Huber, 1998 – Costa Rica
- M. tzotzile Brignoli, 1974 – Mexico
- M. vittatus Bryant, 1948 – Hispaniola

== See also ==
- List of Pholcidae species
