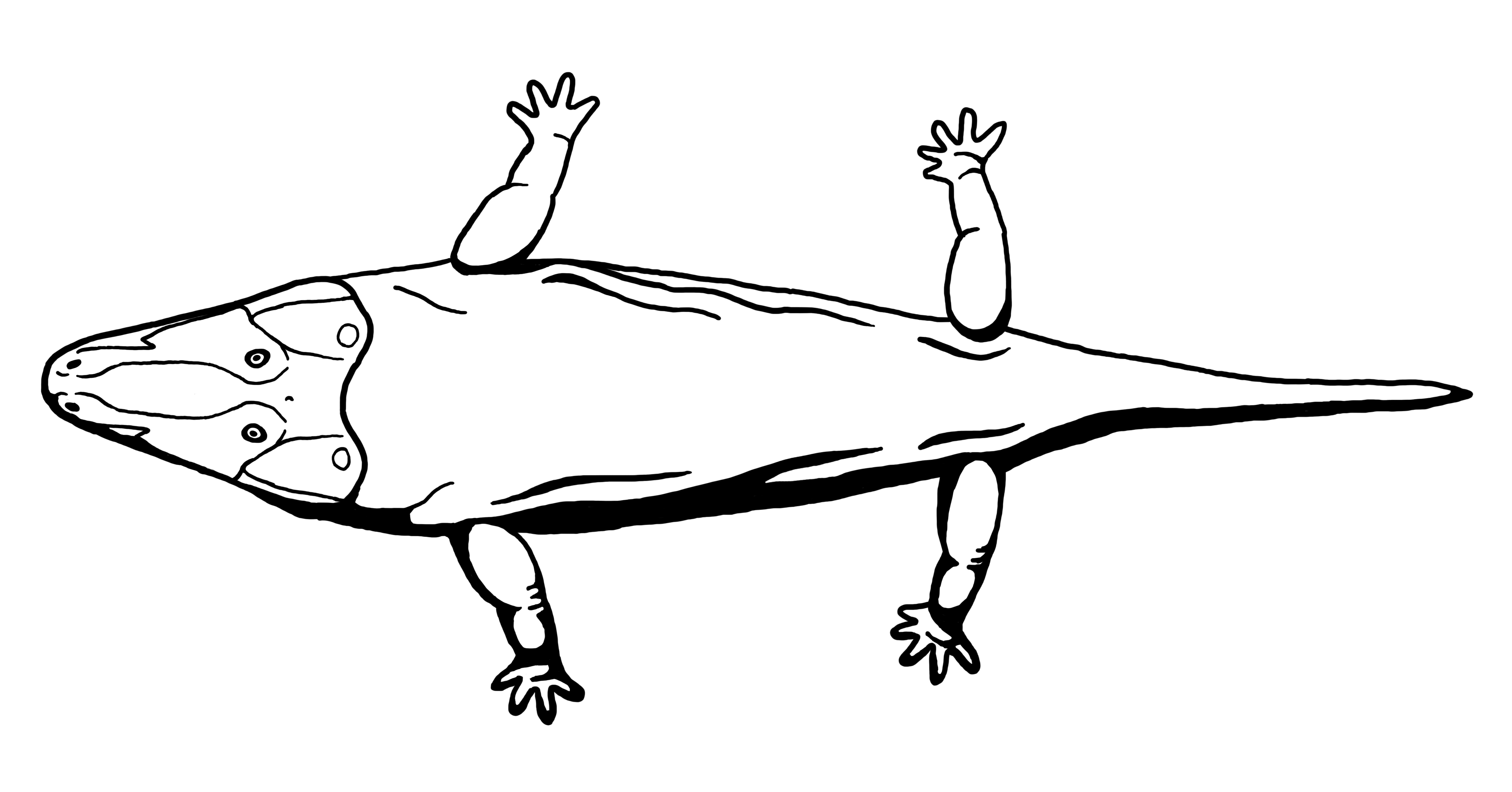
- Restoration of Stenotosaurus stantonensis

Scientific classification
- Kingdom: Animalia
- Phylum: Chordata
- Clade: Tetrapoda
- Order: †Temnospondyli
- Suborder: †Stereospondyli
- Clade: †Capitosauria
- Family: †Stenotosauridae
- Genus: †Stenotosaurus; Romer, 1947

Type species
- †Stenotosaurus semiclausus Romer, 1947

Other species
- †S. aitoualii Dahoumane, 2026; †S. gracilis Kamphausen, 1983; †S. stantonensis Woodward, 1904

= Stenotosaurus =

Stenotosaurus Temporal range: Middle Triassic, Anisian

Extinct genus of temnospondyls

Stenotosaurus is an extinct genus of capitosaurian temnospondyl within the family Stenotosauridae. Two species are universally recognized as belonging to this genus: S. semiclausus, the type, from the early Anisian Upper Bundsandstein of Germany, and S. aitoualii from the Early to Middle Triassic deposits of the Zarzaïtine Series of Algeria. Another species from the same deposits as the type, S. gracilis, is recognized by some authors, though it is considered to be a junior synonym of S. semiclausus by others. In addition, S. stantonensis from the Triassic of England was proposed to be included in this genus, though most authors maintain its generic separation from S. semiclausus as Procyclotosaurus stantonensis.
