= Cyclida =

Cyclida Temporal range: Early Carboniferous–Late Cretaceous
- Diagram of Brittaniclus rankini (formerly Americlus rankini) in ventral view

Scientific classification
- Kingdom: Animalia
- Phylum: Arthropoda
- Clade: Pancrustacea
- Superclass: Multicrustacea
- Order: †Cyclida; Schram, Vonk & Hof, 1997

Genera
- See text

Synonyms
- Cycloidea Glaessner, 1928

Extinct order of crustaceans

Cyclida (formerly Cycloidea, and so sometimes known as cycloids) is an extinct order of crab-like fossil arthropods that lived from the lower Carboniferous to the upper Cretaceous. Their classification is uncertain, but they are generally interpreted as crustaceans, likely belonging to the superclass Multicrustacea. Despite their long-lasting temporal range, these arthropods are rather rare in the fossil record, and are often confined to localities exhibiting exceptional preservation. Although they somewhat resemble members of the Brachyura (true crabs) they are only distantly related within the crustaceans and evolved their crab-like body plan convergently. These crustaceans are distinguished from other groups by a fused cephalothorax, a mainly ovoid-circular carapace, sets of ventral gill plates arranged in a horseshoe shape, and a set of posterior cadual rami.

== Description ==
Cyclida diversity

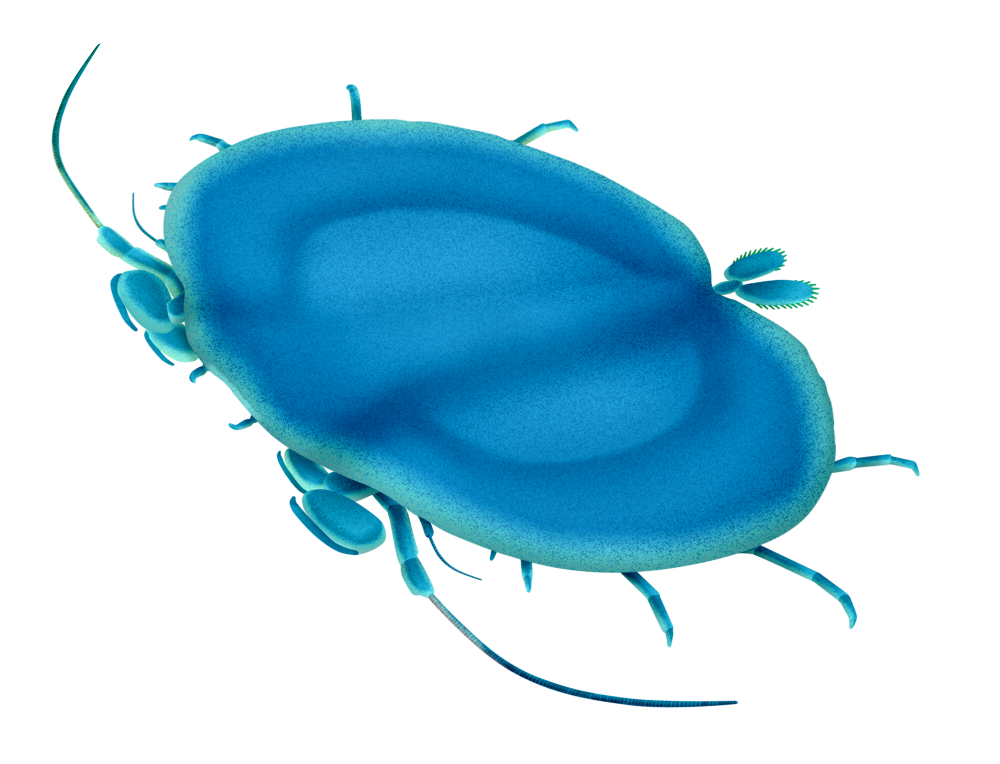
Brittaniclus rankini (Americlidae)

Yunnanocyclus fortis (Schraminidae)

Opolanka decorosa (Schraminidae)

Juracyclus posidoniae (Halicynidae) Limbs speculative

Alsasuacaris nostradamus (Alsasuacaridae) Limbs speculative

Cyclidans have a "striking" resemblance to crabs, with circular to ovoid carapaces, which vary from flat to domed. The carapace covers the entire body. The largest members are over 6 centimetres (2.4 in) across the carapace, while some of the smallest only reached a few millimeters long. Their gill plates are arranged in a horseshoe shape beneath the carapace in at least some species. The head and thorax were fused into a single unit, the cephalothorax. The eyes, when present, were stalked, with the head also bearing two pairs of antennae, the first of which (dubbed the antennulae), are significantly longer than the second. There are at least eight pairs of appendages excluding the antennae and antennulae. The anterior appendages (including the pairs of maxillae and maxillipeds) are modified into chelae (pincer)-like structures, with the posterior appendages being walking legs, which have sharp terminal segments (dactyli). The abdomen is short with either one or two segments, which ends with a pair of posterior caudal rami similar to what is seen in copepods and fish lice.

== Affinities ==
There is considerable debate about the placement of cycloids within the Arthropoda. While they are generally considered to be crustaceans of some kind, doubts have been expressed about the homology of cycloids' respiratory structures with those of other crustaceans, and parallels drawn instead with chelicerates. However, other workers have interpreted the gills as similar to those of crustaceans, and the possession of two pairs of antennae is considered characteristic for many groups of crustaceans.The first description of a cycloid was in the 1836 treatise Illustrations of the Geology of Yorkshire by John Phillips, where Phillips described "Agnostus ? radialis" among the trilobites, with the text "ribs radiating, with acute puncta; abdomen mucronate". In 1838, Hermann von Meyer described a species of trilobite, albeit in the genus Limulus, and later transferred it to a new genus, Halicyne, recognising that it was something different. In 1841, Laurent-Guillaume de Koninck transferred Phillips' species to a new genus, Cyclus, away from the trilobites, although he later described a second species of Cyclus which was later recognised as the hypostome of a trilobite. Cycloids were later considered to be members of the Xiphosura, Brachyura, and branchiurans.

In an unpublished dissertation, Neil D. L. Clark proposed in 1989 that cycloids were copepods. In 1997, Frederick Schram and his co-authors classified them as the sister group to copepods, within the Maxillopoda. In 2008, Jerzy Dzik placed them as an order within the maxillopod suborder Branchiura, which previously contained only the modern fish lice, however, later studies have rejected this placement, due to the similarities between the two groups only being superficial. A 2020 study based on well preserved remains of Americlidae from the Carboniferous of Britain found that Cyclida had the greatest affinities with Copepoda and Malacostraca, and likely represented an independent branch of the Multicrustacea.

Cladogram of Mandibulata after Laville et al. (2025) showing the proposed position of Cyclida within Mandibulata and Crustacea.

- Mandibulata
  - †Aquilonifer
  - - †Tanazios
    - - - †Acheronauta
        - †Captopodus
      - - - †Nereocaris
          - - †Fuxianhuiida
            - †Hymenocarina
        - - - †Euthycarcinida
            - - †Arthropleura
              - Myriapoda crown group (including centipedes and millipedes)
          - Pancrustacea
            - Allotriocarida
              - Branchiopoda (tadpole shrimp/Triops, fairy shrimp, clam shrimp, water fleas)
              - - Hexapoda (including springtails and insects)
                - Xenocarida
                  - Cephalocarida (horseshoe shrimp)
                  - Remipedia
            - - - Branchiura (fish lice)
                - - Ostracoda
                  - Mystacocaridida
              - Multicrustacea
                - Copepoda
                - - Cirripedia (barnacles)
                  - - †Cyclida (Americlidae)
                    - - †Thylacocephala
                      - - Malacostraca (shrimp, prawn, lobsters, mantis shrimp, crab, woodlice, etc)

== Ecology ==
While most cyclidans are known from marine environments, a handful are known to have inhabited freshwater environments. Many marine species occupied reef habitats, while other are known to have lived in deep marine settings. The anterior chelae like appendages are suggested to have been used for grasping and manipulating food items. Cyclidans are suggested to have had a similar ecology to modern crabs, including as detritivores, scavengers, predators and consumers of plant matter. A parasitic mode of life has sometimes been suggested for cyclidans, but this has been considered unlikely due to their large size and well calcified skeletons.

Most fossils are found in a solitary context or small groups, but one had as many as fifty individuals, perhaps gathering to moult.

== Taxa and stratigraphy ==
Cycloids are known from deposits ranging from the Early Carboniferous to the very end of the Cretaceous (Maastrichtian). They are one of only three groups of "generally Palaeozoic" arthropods to survive the Permian–Triassic extinction event, the others being the freshwater-living Euthycarcinoida and the marine Thylacocephala.

=== Families and genera ===
After Schweitzer, Mychko & Feldmann, 2020.

- Family Schraminidae Dzik, 2008
  - Schramine Dzik, 2008 comprises two species from the Carboniferous of North America and three species from the Early Triassic of Madagascar, some of which were formerly included in Halicyne.
  - Opolanka Dzik, 2008 contains a single species found in Late Triassic rocks at Krasiejów in Poland.
  - Apionicon Schram, Vonk & Hof, 1997 is known from a single species found in Upper Carboniferous (Pennsylvanian) shales in Illinois, including Mazon Creek.
- Family Cyclidae Packard, 1885
  - Ambocyclus Schweitzer, Mychko & Feldmann, 2020 contains three species from the Carboniferous of Ireland, North America and Russia
  - Prolatcyclus Mychko, Feldmann, Schweitzer & Alekseev, 2019 Contains two species from the lower Carboniferous of England and Russia
  - Cyclus de Koninck, 1841 formerly contained 17 species found in Carboniferous deposits of Europe, Asia and North America, now defined to only include the species Cyclus radialis from the lower Carboniferous of Europe
  - Carabicyclus Schweitzer, Mychko & Feldmann, 2020 known from two species from the Lower Carboniferous of the British Isles
  - Litocyclus Schweitzer, Mychko & Feldmann, 2020 definitely two and possibly four species, known from the Lower Carboniferous of the British Isles and the Upper Carboniferous of North America
  - Chernyshevine Schweitzer, Mychko & Feldmann, 2020 known from a single species from the Lower Carboniferous of Tajikistan
  - Tazawacyclus Schweitzer, Mychko & Feldmann, 2020 known from a single species from the Lower Carboniferous of Japan
  - Uralocyclus Mychko & Alekseev, 2018 contains two species from the Lower Carboniferous of the British Isles and the Earliest Permian of Chelyabinsk, Russia
- Family Halicynidae Gall & Grauvogel, 1967
  - Halicyne von Meyer, 1844 contains six species from the Middle Triassic of Europe.
  - Carcinaspides Glaessner, 1969 contains a single species found in limestone rocks in the Isar valley of Bavaria (Germany) and is probably of Mid to Late Triassic age.
  - Juracyclus Schweigert, 2007 comprises a single species found in the Early Jurassic Posidonienschiefer near Tübingen, southern Germany.
- Family Americlidae Dzik, 2008
  - Americlus Dzik, 2008 contains A. americanus (formerly Cyclus americanus), a well known species from Mazon Creek, as well as two possible other species, the holotypes of which are now lost, which all known from the Late Carboniferous of North America.
  - Yunnanocyclus Feldmann, Schweitzer & Hu, 2017 single species known from the Middle Triassic of China
  - Brittaniclus Schweitzer, Mychko & Feldmann, 2020 Contains three species from the Carboniferous of Britain
  - Dziklus Schweitzer, Mychko & Feldmann, 2020 Contains a single species known from the Upper Carboniferous of North America
  - Malayacyclus Tang et al. 2021 Contains one species from the Lower Carboniferous of Malaysia
- Family Alsasuacaridae van Bakel, Jagt, Fraaije & Artal, 2011 (Note: The placement of these taxa within Cyclida has been questioned, and some authors argue that these taxa may be true crabs instead).
  - Alsasuacaris van Bakel, Jagt, Fraaije & Artal, 2011 known from two species; found in late Albian to early Cenomanian (Cretaceous) rocks near Alsasua (Navarre, Spain), and the other found in the type locality of the Maastrichtian from the southern Netherlands.
  - Maastrichtocaris Fraaije, Schram & Vonk, 2003 comprises a single species found in Maastrichtian (late Cretaceous) rocks from that period's type locality in the southern Netherlands.
- Family Hemitrochiscidae Trauth, 1918
  - Cyclocarcinides Glaessner, 1969 comprises 5 species known from the Upper Triassic of Europe
  - Hemitrochiscus Schauroth, 1854 known from one species found in Late Permian dolomite near Wünschendorf/Elster (Germany).
  - Oonocarcinus Gemmellaro, 1890 is known from 3 species from the Permian of Sicily and 1 species from the Late Triassic of Slovakia
  - Paraprosopon Gemmellaro, 1890 is known from one species from the Permian of Sicily (Italy).
  - Skuinocyclus Mychko & Alekseev, 2018 comprises one species from the earliest Permian of Bashkortostan, Russia
- Incertae sedis
  - Anhelkocephalon Bill, 1914 known from a single species found in the Middle Triassic of France, originally classified as an isopod.
  - Magnitocyclus Mychko et al. 2022, comprises a single species from the Lower Carboniferous of Russia.
