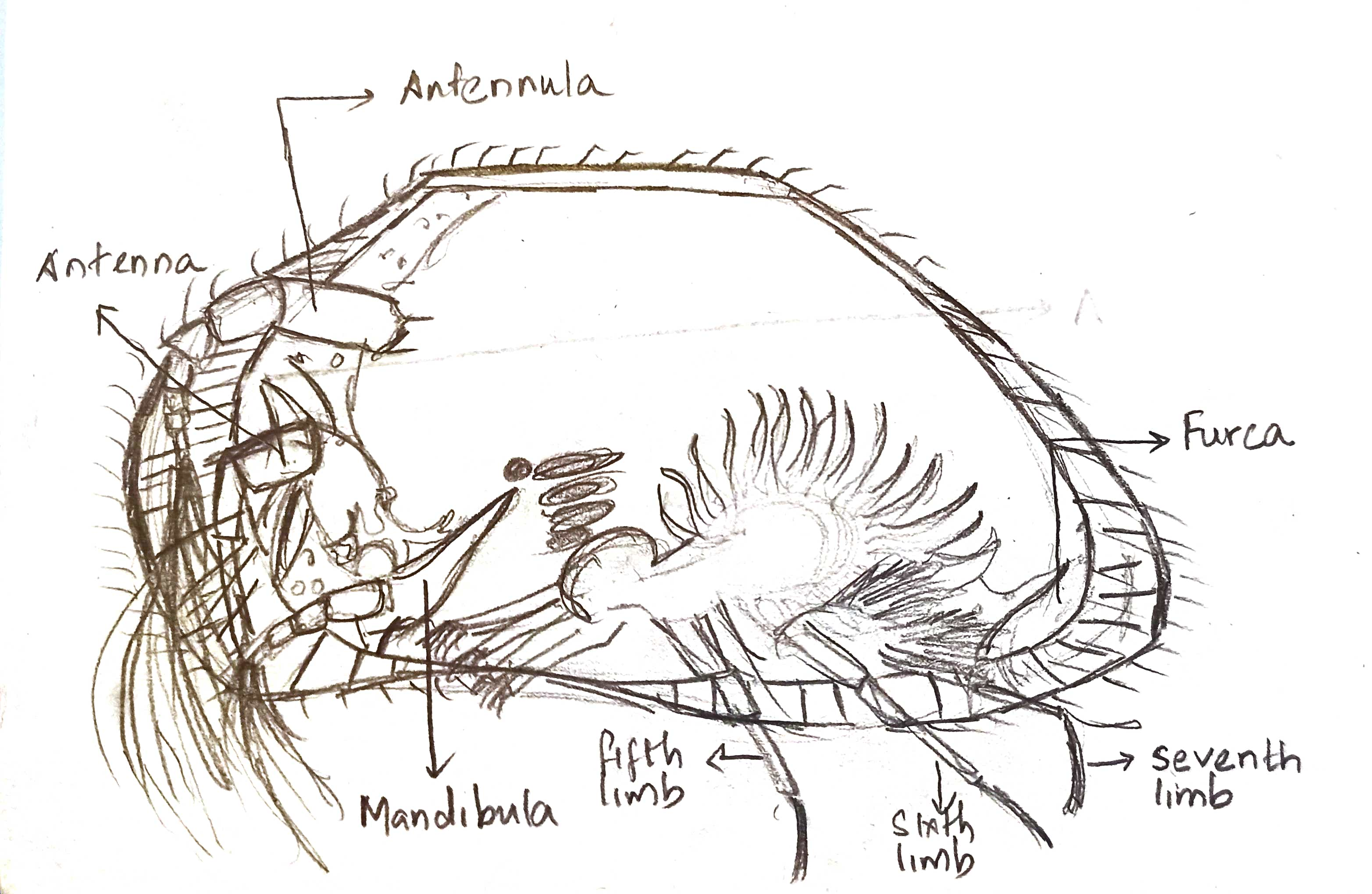
- Internal morphology

Scientific classification
- Kingdom: Animalia
- Phylum: Arthropoda
- Class: Ostracoda
- Order: Podocopida
- Family: Paradoxostomatidae
- Genus: Acetabulastoma
- Species: A. arcticum

Binomial name
- Acetabulastoma arcticum Schornikov, 1970

Synonyms
- Paradoxostoma rostratum

= Acetabulastoma arcticum =

Acetabulastoma arcticum Temporal range: Middle Permian–Recent

Species of mutli-cellular organisms

Acetabulastoma arcticum is a species of an epipelagic ostracod, mostly found associated with sea-ice. It was also referred to as Paradoxostoma rostratum by some early 19th century biologists, Most ostracods are known to be benthic, however, A. arcticum is a parasitic species that has a sympagic association with under sea-ice amphipods.

Members of the genus Acetabulastoma in general live as ectoparasites and each of the different species inhabits a specific species of amphipod. A. arcticum is exclusively found to be hosted by the genus Gammarus.

The taxonomic classification of ostracods (Class Ostracoda) is depicted below to get an overview of the position of A. arcticum in the taxon tree.

- - - Subclass Podocopa
      - Order Podocopida
        - Suborder Cytherocopina
          - Superfamily Cytheroidea(27 families)
          - Superfamily Terrestricytheroidea(1 family)
        - Suborder Cypridocopina
          - Superfamily Macrocypridoidea(1 family)
          - Superfamily Pontocypridoidea(1 family)
          - Superfamily Cypridoidea(4 families)
        - Suborder Darwinulocopina
          - Superfamily Darwinuloidea(1 family)
        - Suborder Bairdiocopina
          - Superfamily Bairdiocopina(3 families)
        - Suborder Sigilliocopina
          - Superfamily Sigillioidea(1 family)
      - Order Platycopida
        - Suborder Platycopina
          - Superfamily Cytherelloidea(1 family)
      - Order Paleocopida
        - Suborder Kirkbyocopina
          - Superfamily Puncioidea(1 family)
  - - Subclass Myodocopa
      - Order Myodocopida
        - Suborder Myodocopina
          - Superfamily Cypridinoidea(1 family)
          - Superfamily Cylindroleberidoidea(1 family)
          - Superfamily Sarsielloidea(3 families)
      - Order Halocyprida
        - Suborder Halocypridina
          - Superfamily Thaumatocyprioidea(1 family)
          - Superfamily Halocypridoidea(1 family)
        - Suborder Cladocopina
          - Superfamily Cladocopoidea(1 family)

== Geologic extent ==
Cytheroidea has been recorded in fossil records from as early as the middle Permian. However, A. arcticum and its fossil abundance has not been reported clearly as to its extent to the geological past. They are also found living today in different regions of the Central Arctic Ocean.

== Distribution ==
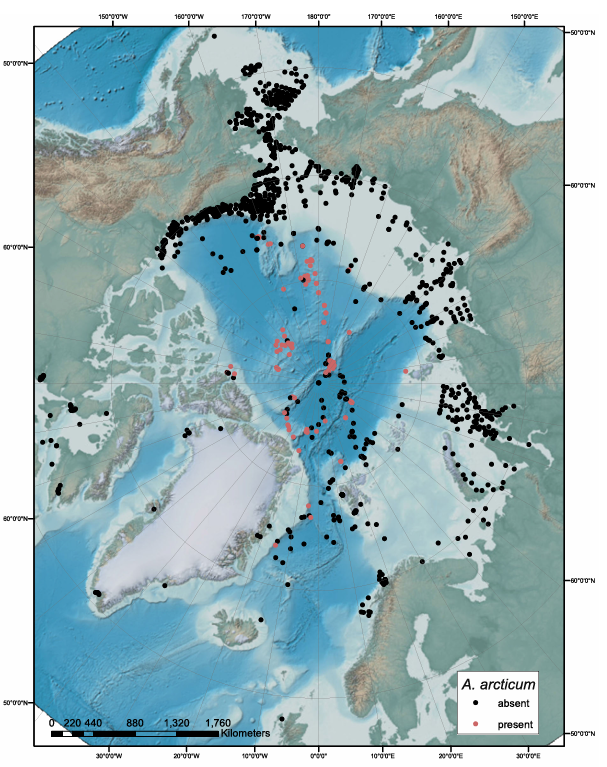
Abundance map of Acetabulastoma arcticum in the Arctic Ocean and surrounding seas.

largely occupies the Central Arctic Ocean due to its perennial sea-ice conditions. There are recorded occurrences in Nansen Basin, Amundsen Basin and Makarov Basin. Latitudinally, it has been reported to be found in high abundance beyond 85°N, although they exist beyond 75°N.

Considering their vertical distribution in the ocean, they have not been found beyond ~3500 m, which is the region of the ocean marked by the deep abyssal plains. This is because of the saturation constant of aragonite that makes it more susceptible to dissolution(Ω_{aragon}<1).Additionally, they do not occur in the continental shelf regions due to the seasonality of sea ice.

A. arcticum is found associated with two different water masses, namely, the Upper Eurasian Basin Deep Water, and Makarov Basin Deep Water. It has also been found predominantly associated with the upper Arctic Ocean Deep Water (AODW) near the transition with Arctic Intermediate Water (AIW)–North Atlantic Water, along with other ostracod species such as Polycope spp. and Pseudocythere caudata.

== Morphology ==
Like most ostracods, A. arcticum is on average around 100 micrometers in length. They have a carapace that is made of chitin and low magnesium calcite. As the two halves of the outer shell grows, they enclose the soft body parts and become bivalve-like structures.

The carapace that encloses A. arcticum is subquadrate to sub-triangulate in shape. Additionally, it is smooth and does not have any complex ornamentation or striations, mostly due to its largely inactive parasitic nature of life.

The eyes are simple, and not compound as in Myodocopa. They have just a naupliar eye consisting of two lateral ocelli and a single ventral ocellus.

Female ostracods of this species have seven limbs with an antennal exopodite.

== Life cycle ==
Around 40% of G. wilkitzkii females had A. arcticum association during the spring. It was also reported that A. arcticum with eggs were found in 0-30% of the amphipod G. wilkitzkii. This enabled the understanding that the adult A. arcticum is attached to Gammarus (Lagunogammarus) wilkitzkii by a sucker like feeding part(mouth) between its gills and the first or second gnathopod. The eggs are laid on the branchial vessels and later escape after six to seven months. This species of Acetobulastoma is also found associated to Gammarus loricatus.

A. arcticum lays its eggs during December. The hatched juveniles are still carried by the mother ostracod till the middle of June. This also means that there is only one brood every year with a seven-month interval between when eggs are laid and when the young ostracods escape. They also have a life span of six years.

== Applications ==
Ostracods in general have been widely used for biostratigraphy although they are considered less popular than other microplaeontological proxies such as foraminifera and diatoms. This is important for paleoclimatic and paleoceanographic reconstruction of the various time periods in geological history. They are also widely used as biological indicators for different water mass conditions due to its preference for specific water mass properties.

The most diagnostic application of A. arcticum, however, is using its stratigraphic availability as an indication for presence of perennial sea-ice conditions. This also indicates a lack of full glaciation where there would be no productivity at all, in the past.

=== A. arcticum sea-ice index ===
The A. arcticum sea-ice index is a semi-quantitative method that was developed for understanding the presence of sea ice in the past using sediment cores. Despite the potential of A. arcticum as an indicator due to its exclusive habitat in perennial ice regions, its abundance in sediment samples reflects an average over time due to low sedimentation rate and dynamic sea ice changes. That is, it is not true to consider it an 'all or none' indicator of sea ice. The index accounts for the concentration of A. arcticum and sedimentation rates in the marine region over a 1000-year interval to make inferences. Assumptions are made in its calculation, including constant biological production and sediment accumulation rates, even though this is rarely the case and could affect its reliability as an indicator

It has been used primarily to reconstruct Arctic Ocean sea-ice history during the last ~45 kyr, that is within the Quaternary, by analyzing core-top data from various locations (49 sediment cores) throughout the Central Arctic, such as the Lomonosov ridge and Mendeleev ridge. This allows correlating ostracod abundance depth-wise and geographically to interpret changes in their temporal and spatial distribution, respectively.

== External reading ==
- World Ostracoda Database
- Lake Biwa Museum
- Arctic Ocean Diversity

== See also ==
- Microfossils
- Micropaleontology
- Paleoclimate
- Glacial cycles
- Ice cores
- Geological time scale
