= Maristella (crustacean) =

Scientific classification
- Domain: Eukaryota
- Kingdom: Animalia
- Phylum: Arthropoda
- Class: Ostracoda
- Order: Myodocopida
- Family: Cypridinidae
- Subfamily: Cypridininae
- Genus: Maristella; Reda & Gerrish, 2019

Type species
- Maristella chicoi Reda & Gerrish, 2019

Species
- See text

Genus of crustaceans

Maristella is a genus of ostracods belonging to the Myodocopida (Cypridinidae). The genus belongs to a diverse clade of Caribbean bioluminescent ostracods. Males perform species-specific luminescent courtship displays. It was chosen as one of the top ten species of 2019: WoRMS top 10 - 2019: Maristella chicoi. The video showing these light displays can be seen here.

Maristella is with seven species the most species-rich genus of the family. Other genera include Enewton, Photeros, Konickeria and Vargula. Maristella means 'star of the sea'. Maristella is the only genus with lateral or diagonal luminescent courtship displays.

== Species ==
- Maristella chicoi Reda et al., 2019 - Belize
- Maristella ignitula (Cohen & Morin, 1989) - Panama
- Maristella lucidella (Cohen & Morin, 1989) - Panama
- Maristella micamacula (Cohen & Morin, 1989) - Panama
- Maristella noropsela (Cohen & Morin, 1989) - Panama
- Maristella psammobia (Cohen & Morin, 1989) - Panama
- Maristella scintilla (Cohen & Morin, 1989) - Panama
