= Azygocypridina lowryi =

Scientific classification
- Kingdom: Animalia
- Phylum: Arthropoda
- Class: Ostracoda
- Order: Myodocopida
- Family: Cypridinidae
- Genus: Azygocypridina
- Species: A. lowryi

Binomial name
- Azygocypridina lowryi Kornicker, 1985

Species of seed shrimp

Azygocypridina lowryi, colloquially known as the baked bean, is a species of ostracod crustacean or "seed shrimp" in the family Cypridinidae. It is found in deep waters off the east coast of Australia.

== Description ==
Azygocypridina lowryi grows to a length of about 1 cm (0.4 in). It has a shrimp-like body enclosed between a pair of translucent valves that are hinged at the top and are superficially similar to those of a bivalve mollusc. The animal inside is a bright orange colour and can be seen through the valves which has led to local fishermen naming it the "baked bean". There are two pairs of long antennae which project from the shell and which are used in swimming. The first pair bear long iridescent hairs. These act as a diffraction grating and cause iridescence by the diffraction of light in a manner similar to that which happens in a hologram. Another unusual feature of this ostracod is the possession of a lateral eye which takes the form of a hairy flap of skin containing flecks of photosensitive pigment. This eye is unable to form a proper image but is able to detect differences in the intensity of light.

== Distribution ==
Azygocypridina lowryi is found on the sandy seabed at depths between 100 and 500 metres (330 and 1,640 ft) off the east coast of Australia. Its range extends from Cape York in Queensland to Tasmania in the south. It comes from an ancient lineage: fossils of other members of the genus Azygocypridina have been found in rocks from the Cretaceous period dating back about 150 million years.

== Biology ==
Little is known of the behaviour of this ostracod but when kept in an aquarium it tended to bury itself in the sediment when exposed to light. It is a scavenger and feeds on dead fish and other organic material that finds its way to the seabed. It can swim rather clumsily in a jerky fashion using its second pair of antennae as oars. The larvae are planktonic and go through six moults before settling on the seabed as juveniles.
