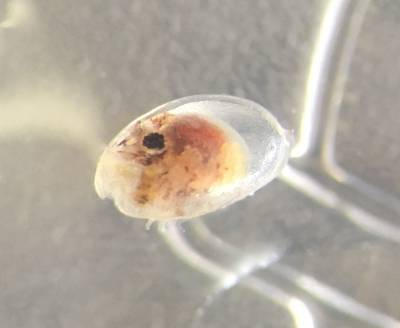
- Vargula tsujii

Scientific classification
- Domain: Eukaryota
- Kingdom: Animalia
- Phylum: Arthropoda
- Class: Ostracoda
- Order: Myodocopida
- Family: Cypridinidae
- Genus: Vargula
- Species: V. tsujii

Binomial name
- Vargula tsujii Kornicker & Baker, 1977

= Vargula tsujii =

Species of crustacean

Vargula tsujii is a bioluminescent cypridinid ostracod found in southern California. It feeds on dead and decaying fish and invertebrates. Vargula tsujii is an important prey item of the plainfin midshipman fish (Porichthys notatus), as it is the source of luciferin for the bioluminescence seen in the fish.
