= Pauline avibella =

Pauline avibella Temporal range: Wenlock

Scientific classification
- Kingdom: Animalia
- Phylum: Arthropoda
- Class: Ostracoda
- Order: Myodocopida
- Family: Cylindroleberididae
- Genus: †Pauline
- Species: †P. avibella

Binomial name
- †Pauline avibella Siveter, Briggs, Siveter, Sutton & Joomun, 2012

Extinct species of seed shrimp

Pauline avibella is a fossil ostracod from the Silurian with unusually well preserved soft parts, including limbs, eyes, gills and alimentary system.

The tiny shelled arthropod was found in 425-million-year-old rocks in the Herefordshire Lagerstätte in England near the Welsh Border. The rocks at the site date to the Silurian period of geological time. At the time, southern Great Britain was a sea area on a small continent situated in warm, southerly subtropical latitudes. The marine animals living there were covered by a fall of volcanic ash that preserved them frozen in time.
