= Nasunaris =

Nasunaris Temporal range: Wenlock

Scientific classification
- Kingdom: Animalia
- Phylum: Arthropoda
- Class: Ostracoda
- Order: Myodocopida
- Family: Cylindroleberididae
- Genus: †Nasunaris
- Species: †N. flata

Binomial name
- †Nasunaris flata Siveter et al., 2010

Extinct genus of seed shrimps

Nasunaris flata is an extinct genus of ostracods which existed in the United Kingdom during the Silurian period. It was first named by David J. Siveter, Derek E. G. Briggs, Derek J. Siveter and Mark D. Sutton in 2010.

== See also ==
- 2010 in paleontology
