= Azygocypridina =

Scientific classification
- Domain: Eukaryota
- Kingdom: Animalia
- Phylum: Arthropoda
- Class: Ostracoda
- Order: Myodocopida
- Family: Cypridinidae
- Subfamily: Azygocypridininae
- Genus: Azygocypridina; Sylvester-Bradley, 1950

Genus of seed shrimps

Azygocypridina is a genus of ostracods in the family Cypridinidae, which appears to be "the least derived living ostracod", having remained largely unchanged for 350 million years. It contains the following species:

- Azygocypridina africanus (Stebbing, 1902)
- Azygocypridina birsteini Rudjakov, 1961
- Azygocypridina brynmawria Diamond, de Forges & Kornicker, 2008
- Azygocypridina gibber (Muller, 1906)
- Azygocypridina grimaldii (Granata, 1919)
- Azygocypridina imperator (Brady, 1880)
- Azygocypridina imperialis (Stebbing, 1901)
- Azygocypridina lowryi Kornicker, 1985
- Azygocypridina ohtai Hiruta, 1981
- Azygocypridina rudjakovi Kornicker, 1970
