= Rutidermatidae =

Scientific classification
- Kingdom: Animalia
- Phylum: Arthropoda
- Clade: Pancrustacea
- Class: Ostracoda
- Order: Myodocopida
- Family: Rutidermatidae; Brady & Norman, 1896

Family of crustaceans

Rutidermatidae is a family of crustaceans belonging to the order Myodocopida.

Genera:

- Alternochelata Kornicker, 1958
- Metaschisma Kornicker, 1994
- Rutiderma Brady & Norman, 1896
- Scleraner Kornicker, 1975
