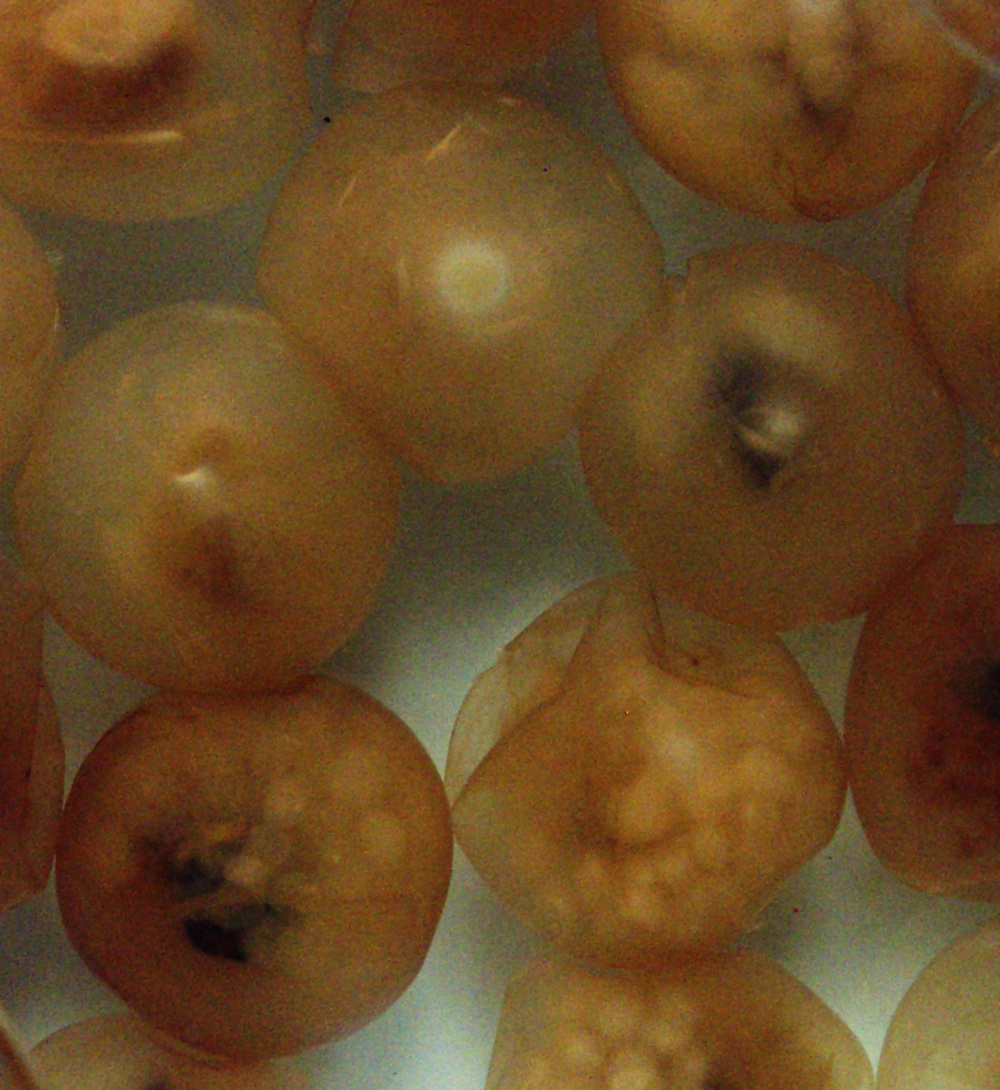
- Preserved specimens of Gigantocypris sp. from Antarctica

Scientific classification
- Domain: Eukaryota
- Kingdom: Animalia
- Phylum: Arthropoda
- Class: Ostracoda
- Order: Myodocopida
- Suborder: Myodocopina; Sars, 1866

Superfamilies
- Cylindroleberidoidea Müller, 1906; Cypridinoidea Baird, 1850; †Nymphatelinoidea Siveter, Siveter, Sutton & Briggs, 2007; Sarsielloidea Brady & Norman, 1896

= Myodocopina =

Suborder of seed shrimps

Myodocopina is a suborder of ostracods.
