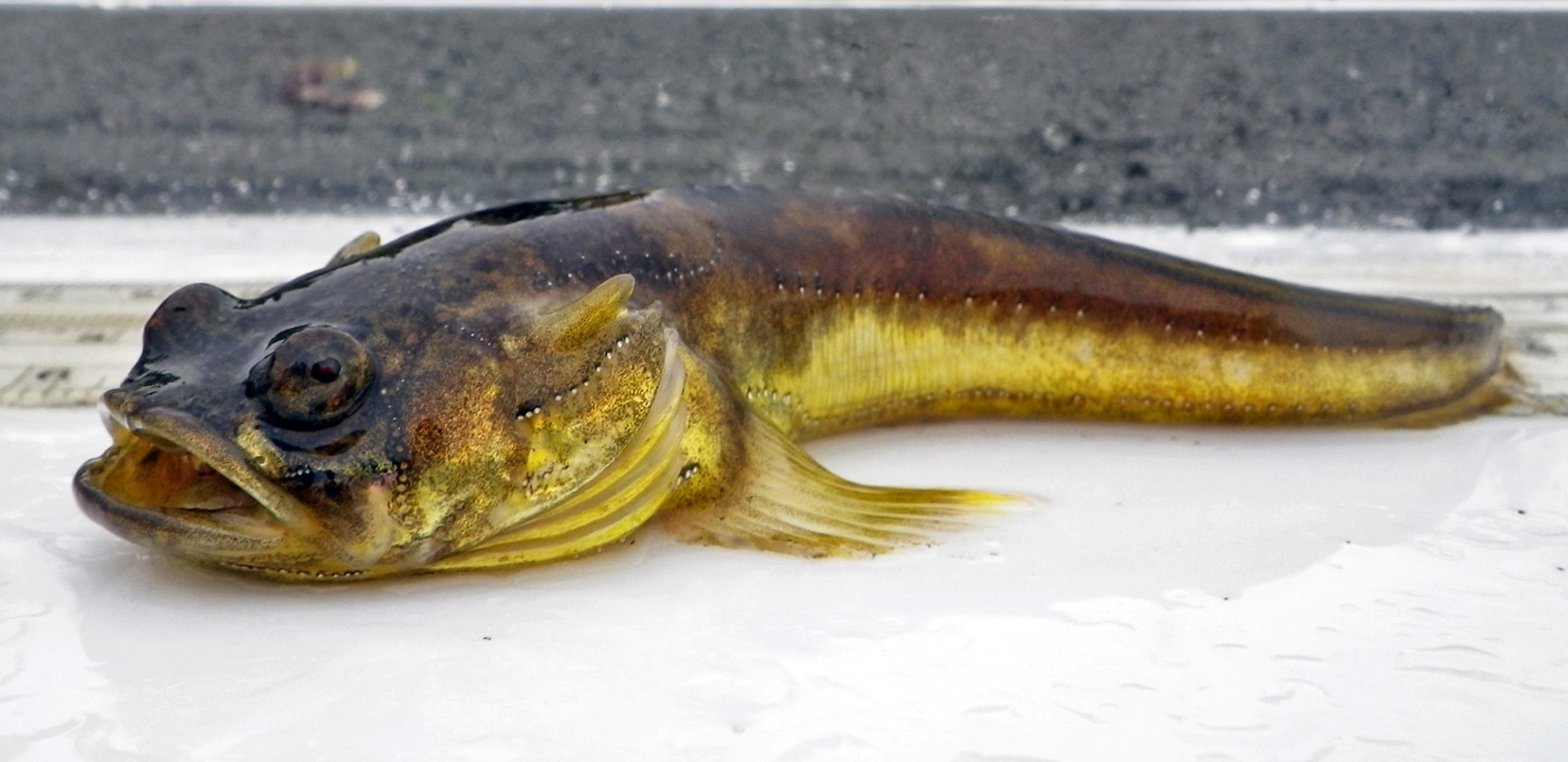

Conservation status
- Least Concern (IUCN 3.1)

Scientific classification
- Kingdom: Animalia
- Phylum: Chordata
- Class: Actinopterygii
- Division: Teleostei
- Order: Batrachoidiformes
- Family: Batrachoididae
- Genus: Porichthys
- Species: P. notatus

Binomial name
- Porichthys notatus Girard, 1854

= Porichthys notatus =

Species of fish

The plainfin midshipman (Porichthys notatus) is a species of bottom-dwelling batrachoid toadfish. It is a member of the midshipman genus, Porichthys, the only batrachoid fishes that have photophores. It is native to the North American coast of the Pacific Ocean, where its distribution extends along the coast from Sitka, Alaska, to Magdalena Bay in southern Baja California. There it inhabits shallow waters and will make migrations every spring to the rocky intertidal zones of the coast to breed.

The "midshipman" name comes from the line of photophores found on their body; they are positioned similarly to the uniforms of midshipmen—the lowest-ranking naval officer of any navy. This fish is the "plainfin" in comparison to another midshipman species, the specklefin midshipman.

The plainfin midshipman is known for its "singing" abilities. During breeding, both male and female fish will vocalize to attract mates. The sound is well known among houseboat residents and has earned the fish nicknames of the "California singing fish," or the "Humming Toadfish," as well as becoming the namesake for The Sausalito Humming Toadfish Festival.

== Description ==
This fish reaches up to 38 cm (15 in) in length, and is one of the largest of the Porichthys toadfishes. It is brownish to olive to iridescent purple dorsally, becoming lighter on the sides and yellowish/golden on the belly, though this can depend on sex. Below the eye is a whitish patch and black crescent. Adults usually lack saddle-marks, but there are 6-7 saddle-marks if they are present. A young individual looks like an adult but may have a few dark saddle-marks. P. notatus has wide pectoral fins and a narrow but rounded tail fin. There are four lateral lines on the head and sides of the body.

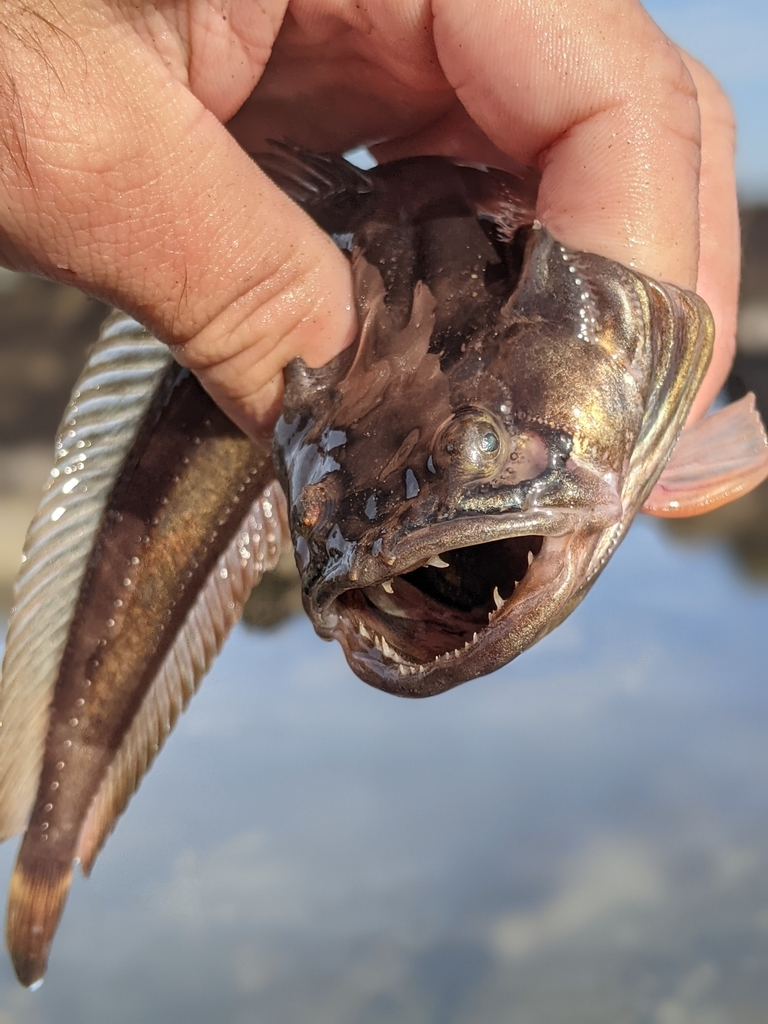
Adult plainfin midshipman

It has 33-38 soft rays in the long second dorsal fin, 30-35 anal rays, and 17 - 20 pectoral rays. The length of the fish varies from female to males. It is distinguished from other fish in its genus by the positioning of its photophores. All Porichthys have a series of photophores along the sides and bottoms of its body: the branchiostegal, gastric, gular, lateral, mandibular, pleural, and ventral photophores. In the plainfin midshipman, the branchiostegal photophore series is V-shaped. The pleural photophore series ends posterior to the pleural lateral line (it shares this with the specklefin and mimetus midshipmen).

The plainfin midshipman is both sexually dimorphic and dimorphic between the two males (two different morphs that correspond to different breeding styles; see Breeding). Females can range from 9.6 – 15.2 cm in standard length and can weigh 11.1 – 47.3 g. Type I males measure 12.0 cm – 21.0 cm in standard length and can weigh 30 – 206 g. On the other hand, Type II males weigh 3.9-17.3g, and measure 6.5-10.5 cm in standard length. However, all sexes experience annual fluctuations in body size; for example, body mass peaks for Type I males during pre-nesting season.

Similar species include:

- Specklefin midshipman (Porichthys myriaster), which differs from the plainfin by bands on its caudal fin that the plainfin lacks and U-shaped branchiostegal photophore series. This is the only other Porichthys species with which the P. notatus overlaps.
- Mimetus midshipman (Porichthys mimetus), which differs from the plainfin in that it has 32-36 second dorsal rays instead of 33-38 in the plainfin, as well as.

== Habitat and behavior ==
During the nonbreeding season, the plainfin midshipmen typically inhabit moderately deep ocean waters off the Pacific coast of North America, from Canada to Baja California. They can range from shallow water just below the tide to depths of 366 m and prefer sandy and muddy bottoms.

=== Diet ===
Its diet includes crustaceans and fish. It is nocturnal, feeding at night and resting during the day, when it buries itself in the sand. As juvenile, they feed on small crustacean larvae and zooplankton.

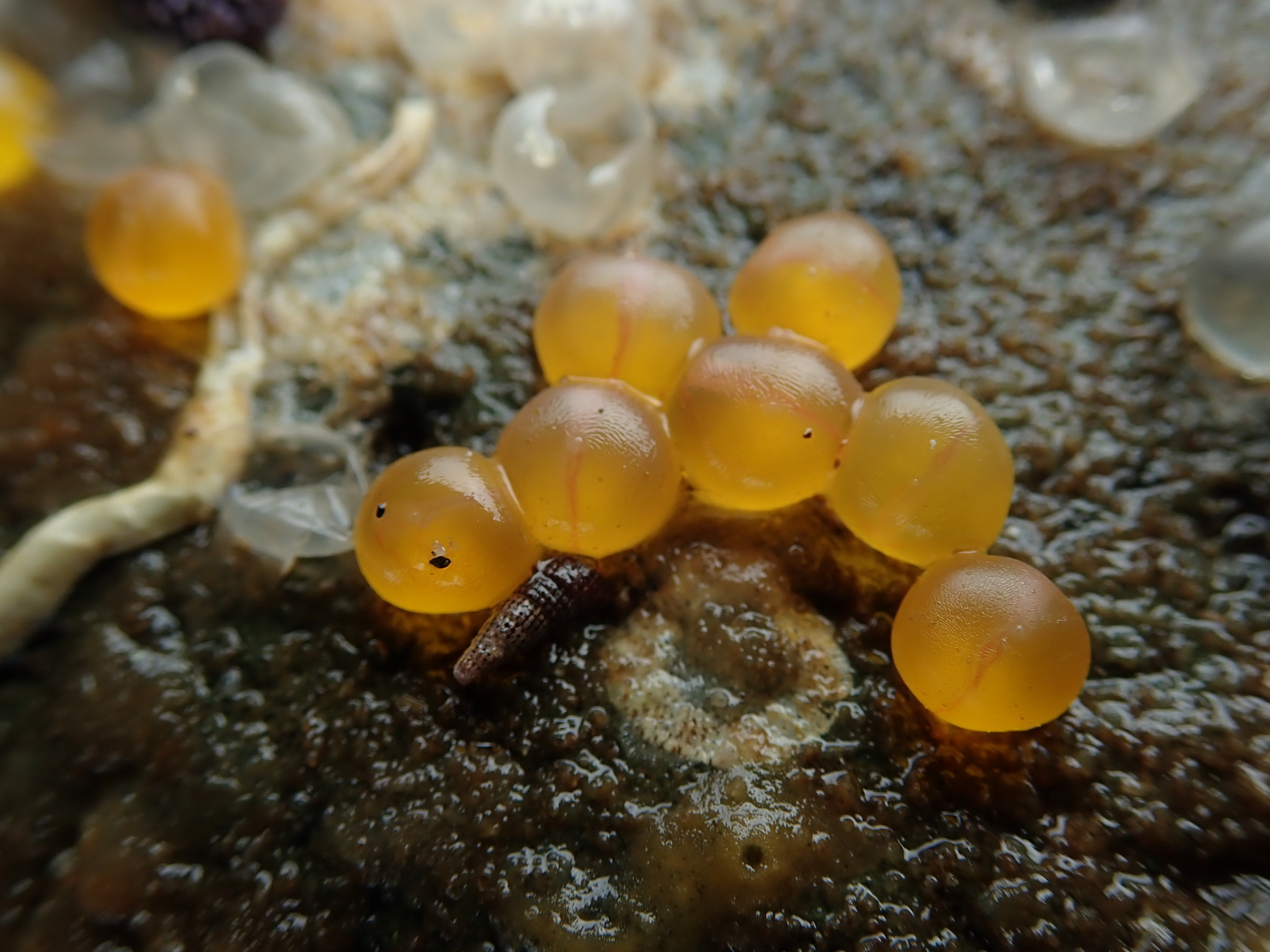
Plainfin midshipman eggs.

=== Breeding ===
During the late spring and early summer, they migrate from the depths to the intertidal zones of the coast to breed. For example, in Monterey, California, they come from canyons to seek outcroppings in shallow intertidal zones. They can be found by lifting up rocks or logs in the intertidal zones during this season.

This fish is oviparous, and the male is dimorphic, designated as Type I and Type II.

The Type I male claims a nest site, which is generally under a rock or boulders in the intertidal zone. Once underneath, he digs out a cavity using his pectoral fins. A female will come seeking out males—attracted by his vocalizations—to deposit her eggs in his cavity. He will then fertilize the eggs. One female normally lays 200-400 eggs, and the number of eggs varies directly with body size. The male may attract more than one female and end up with over 1000 eggs in his nest. The female deposits the eggs in a single layer to the upper wall of the nest. Once the female spawns, she leaves the eggs in the care of the male and departs. The male tends them by fanning them, keeping the nest clean, and hydrating them if they begin to desiccate at low tide. He protects the larvae post-hatching until they reach their juvenile stage and leave the nest, about 45 days after fertilization. Very occasionally, an egg will yield twin larvae.

Type II males are consistently smaller in size than Type I. There are significantly fewer Type II males than Type I males within reproductively active populations of males, with a Type I to Type II ratio around 9:1. In contrast to Type I males, Type II males do not defend nests or guard eggs, but rather sneak in to the nest sites of Type I males and fertilize the eggs there. Type II males at times display behavior of fanning their own sperm into a nest containing a gravid female. The ratio of gonad weight to body weight of Type II males is on average nine times greater than that of Type I males. Type II males can be mistaken as gravid females as their abdomen distend due to enlarged testes.

The conditions of the intertidal breeding habitat change regularly with the tide. A male that tends to his nest can become stranded as the tide recedes, even becoming beached completely out of the water. The fish tolerates this well by elevating their hematocrit levels and tolerating high lactate levels. It can "breathe" air. Physiologically, it is well adapted to hypoxia, as well as hypercapnia. Even its sperm are quite functional in low-oxygen conditions.

The eggs take about 16–20 days to incubate. After hatching, the embryos remain attached to the cavity wall by the yolk sacs for about a month, after which they will detach and bury in the mud. The juveniles are still nocturnal and will bury in the mud during the day and feed at night. They will gradually make their way back to the water.

== Bioluminescence ==
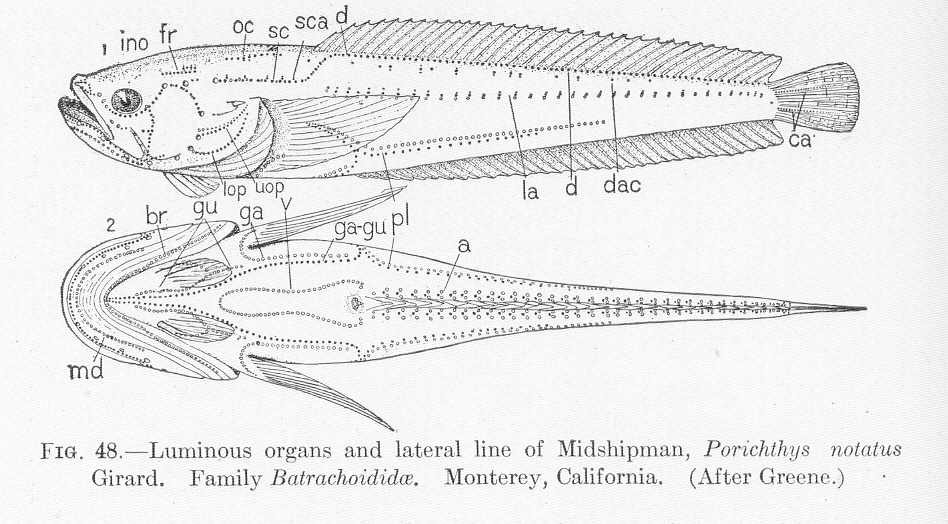
Drawing showing position of luminous organs and lateral line

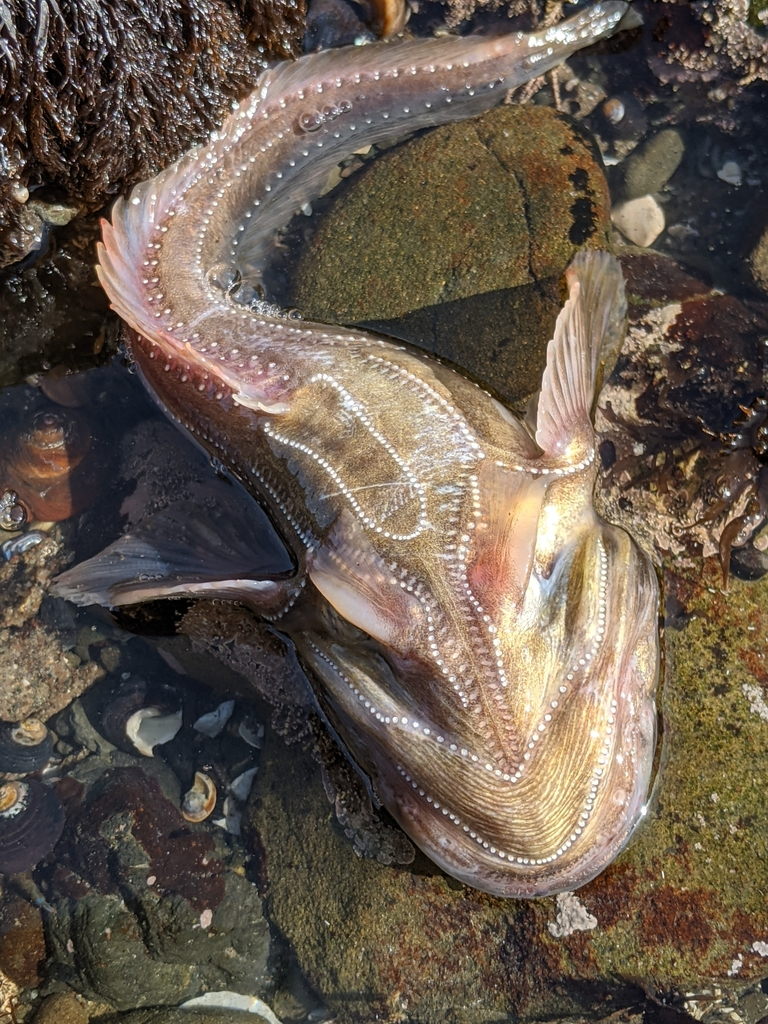
Adult plainfin midshipman with photophores visible.

P. notatus is bioluminescent. It has photophores in the skin of its head and much of its body. One fish has over 700 photophores, each about a millimeter wide. They contain luciferin. Norepinephrine activates them, producing a distinct fluorescent green glow. The fish is only luminescent during courtship. It may play a role in predator avoidance and potentially attracting prey, as well. In the juvenile, photophores point ventrally, directing their illumination downwards. This helps to shadow the fish in a silhouette that might make it harder for predators to see.

Not all individuals express this trait. There are two main populations of the species, a southern population found as far north as San Francisco, and a second population extending to the northern reaches of its range. Fish of the southern population are bioluminescent, but most northern fish are not, particularly those from the Puget Sound. The nonluminescent fish lack luciferin in their photophores. In experiments, nonluminescent fish can be made luminescent by dosing them orally or by injection with luciferin obtained from the luminescent ostracod crustacean Vargula hilgendorfii. This crustacean has a similar, but not identical, luciferin compound which can apparently function in the photophores of the fish, as well. It is thought that the fish obtains its luciferin in the wild by eating this type of crustacean, perhaps a relative such as Vargula tsujii, and that the nonluminescent northern population does not have any of these available to them.

== Vocalization ==
Both male and female of the species produce vocalizations. The female may produce a brief grunting sound, usually in agonistic encounters. The Type II male performs similar behaviors to the female. The Type I male is much more vocal, both in conflict situations and in courtship. He utters long strings of shorter grunts and growls while fighting, but his courtship call is more of a prolonged hum. This sound is only produced at night. He may produce this sound for over an hour at a time, reaching frequencies near 98-106 Hz. When a male makes the sound, gravid females respond by moving toward him.

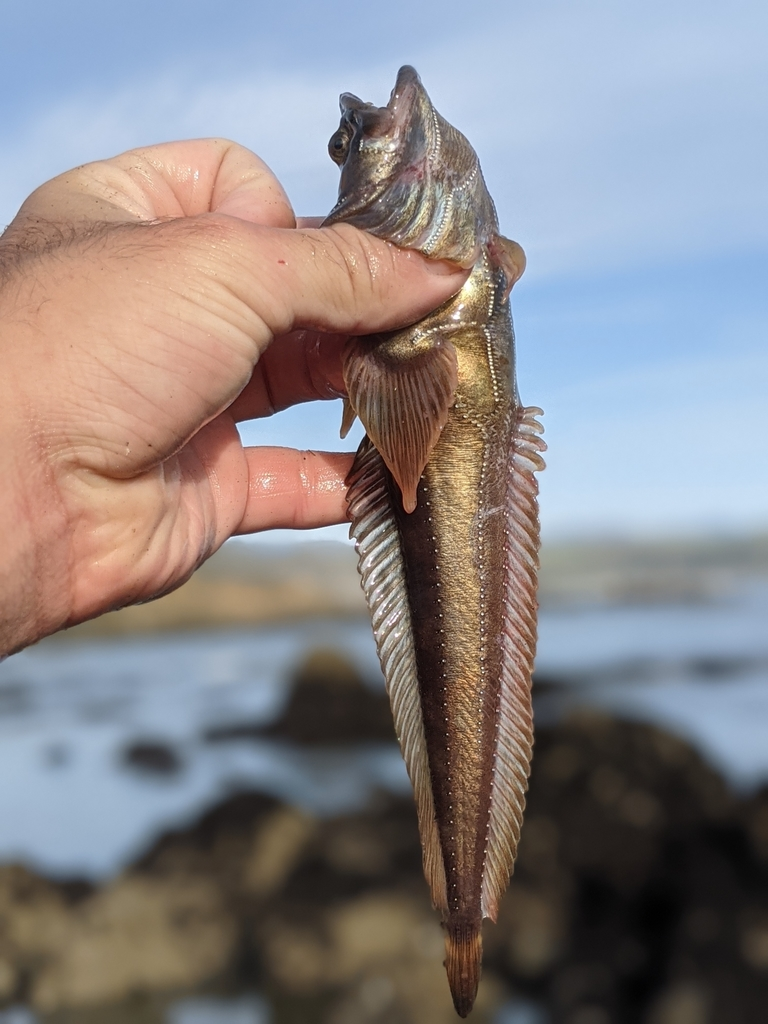
Side view of a plainfin midshipman fish.

The fish produces the sound using the muscles of its modified swim bladder. It receives the sound in its saccule, a sensory organ in the inner ear. During the breeding season, hormones induce the microscopic anatomy of the female's saccules to change in such a way that she can better sense the harmonics of the male's calls.

People in some areas are very familiar with the sound of this fish. Where there are many breeding males, the sound of many simultaneous long, loud underwater courtship calls can be clearly heard on land. In parts of Washington and in the San Francisco Bay Area there are noisemaking populations. The fish is notorious in Sausalito, California, where a community of people live on houseboats. The resident population of the fish becomes very obvious during the breeding season, when it spends the night vocalizing so loudly it keeps the houseboat residents awake. Its calling is most intense between midnight and 6:00 a.m. Despite its annoying behavior the fish inspired an affectionate local tribute in Sausalito, the Humming Toadfish Festival.

The sound of the vocalization has been likened to a chorus of kazoos, B-29s flying in formation, an amplifier, a didgeridoo, "a drone of bees or maybe even the chanting of monks," and "an orchestra full of mournful, rasping oboes."

== Predators ==
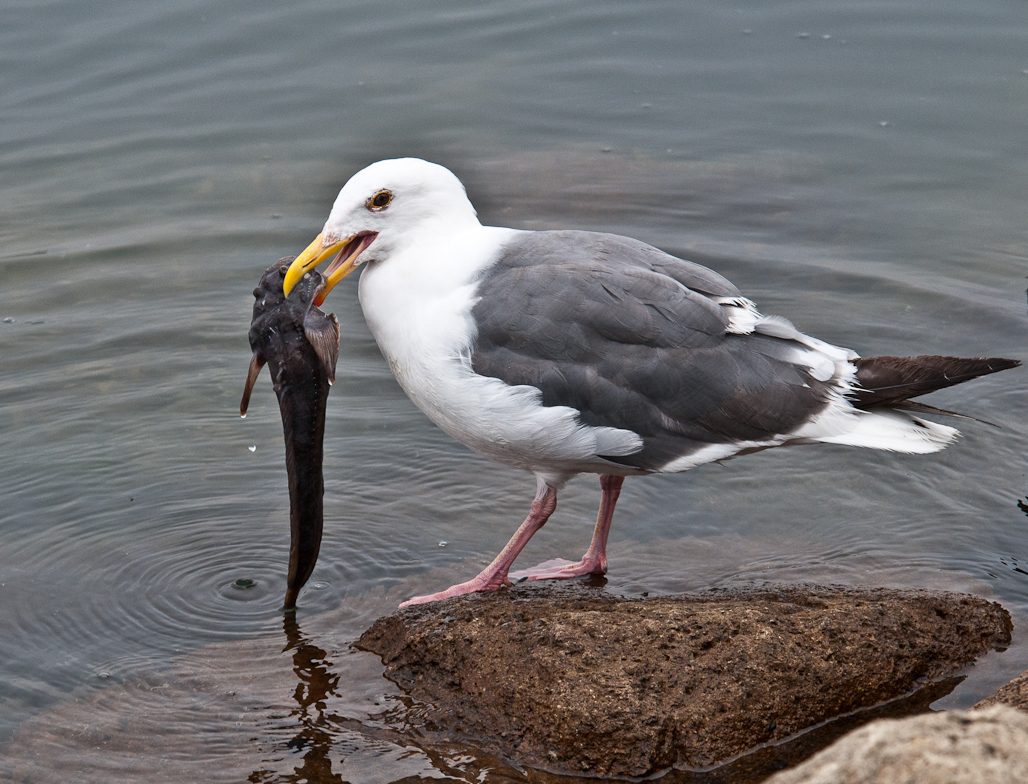
Western gulls and other birds will catch and eat plainfin midshipman

It is eaten by seals, sea lions, otters, mink, crustaceans, fish, etc. This fish is an important prey for the bald eagle in some coastal areas, being the most common food provided to eaglets by their parents in one study on Vancouver Island. This is a concern, as this fish has been found to contain relatively high levels of contaminants, such as dioxins. It is also prey for the northwestern crow, the glaucous-winged gull, and the great blue heron.

P. notatus is host to the parasitic copepods Lepeophtheirus remiopsis and Hamaticolax prolixus.

== Conservation ==
P. notatus is not a threatened species. It is widespread and apparently not in decline.
