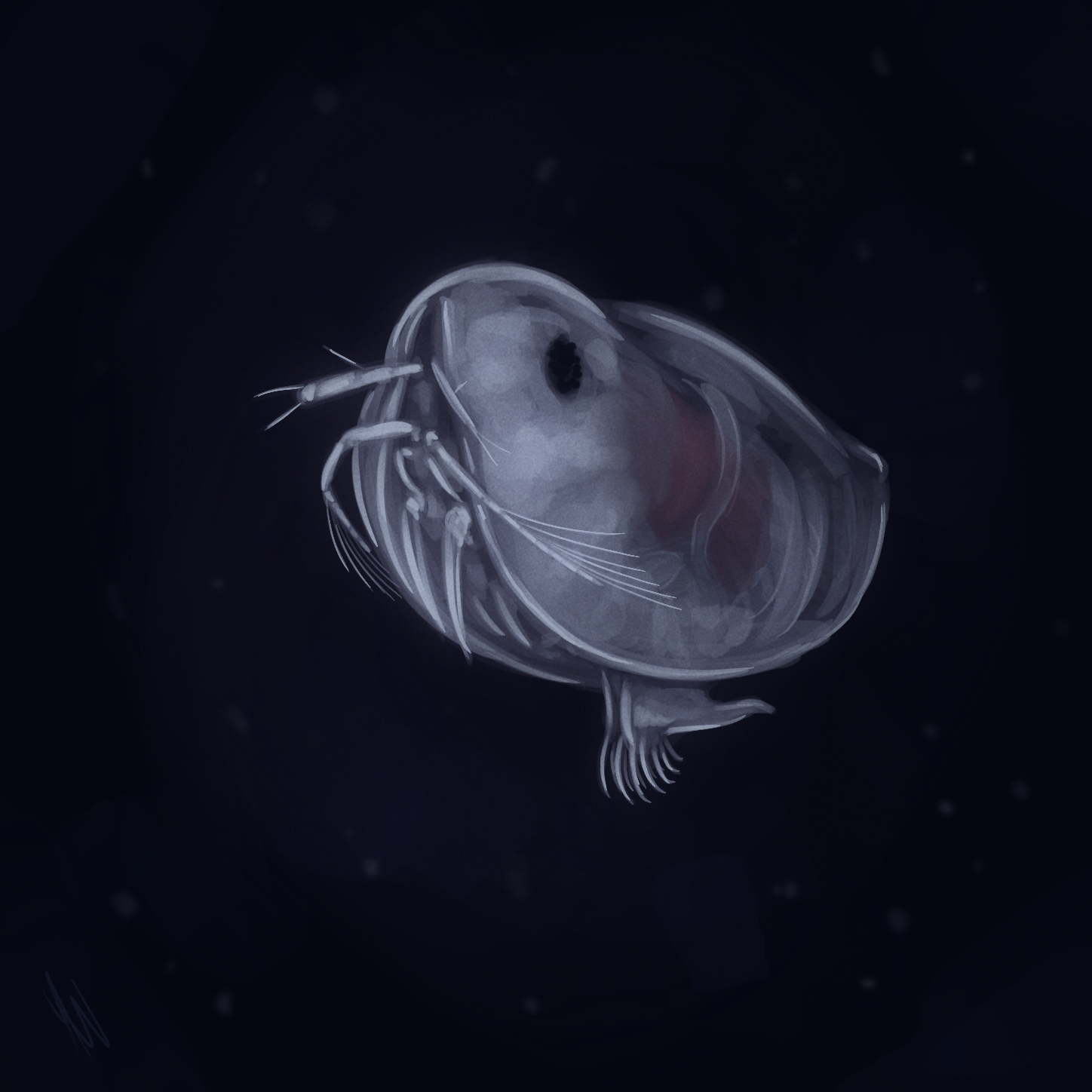
- Colymbosathon ecplecticos

Scientific classification
- Kingdom: Animalia
- Phylum: Arthropoda
- Class: Ostracoda
- Order: Myodocopida
- Family: Cylindroleberididae
- Genus: †Colymbosathon; Siveter, Sutton, Briggs & Siveter, 2003
- Species: †C. ecplecticos

Binomial name
- †Colymbosathon ecplecticos Siveter, Sutton, Briggs & Siveter, 2003

= Colymbosathon =

Extinct genus of seed shrimps

Colymbosathon ecplecticos is a fossil ostracod described from a specimen obtained from the Coalbrookdale Formation of Herefordshire which is dated to the Silurian (425 Ma). It was given a binomial name in 2003 and is the only species within the genus Colymbosathon. The generic name is from Greek Kolymbos (swimmer) and sathon (having a large penis) while the species epithet is from ekplektikos meaning "astounding".

Imaging and virtual reconstruction of the fossil showed that the soft parts were well-preserved. The specimen was placed in the Cylindroleberididiae based on its having six pairs of gills. The bivalved carapace is about 5210 μm long. The specimen, a male, was found to have a large copulatory organ. The find was popularized as being the oldest known penis. It is the oldest known specimen with gills among fossil ostracods.

== Description ==
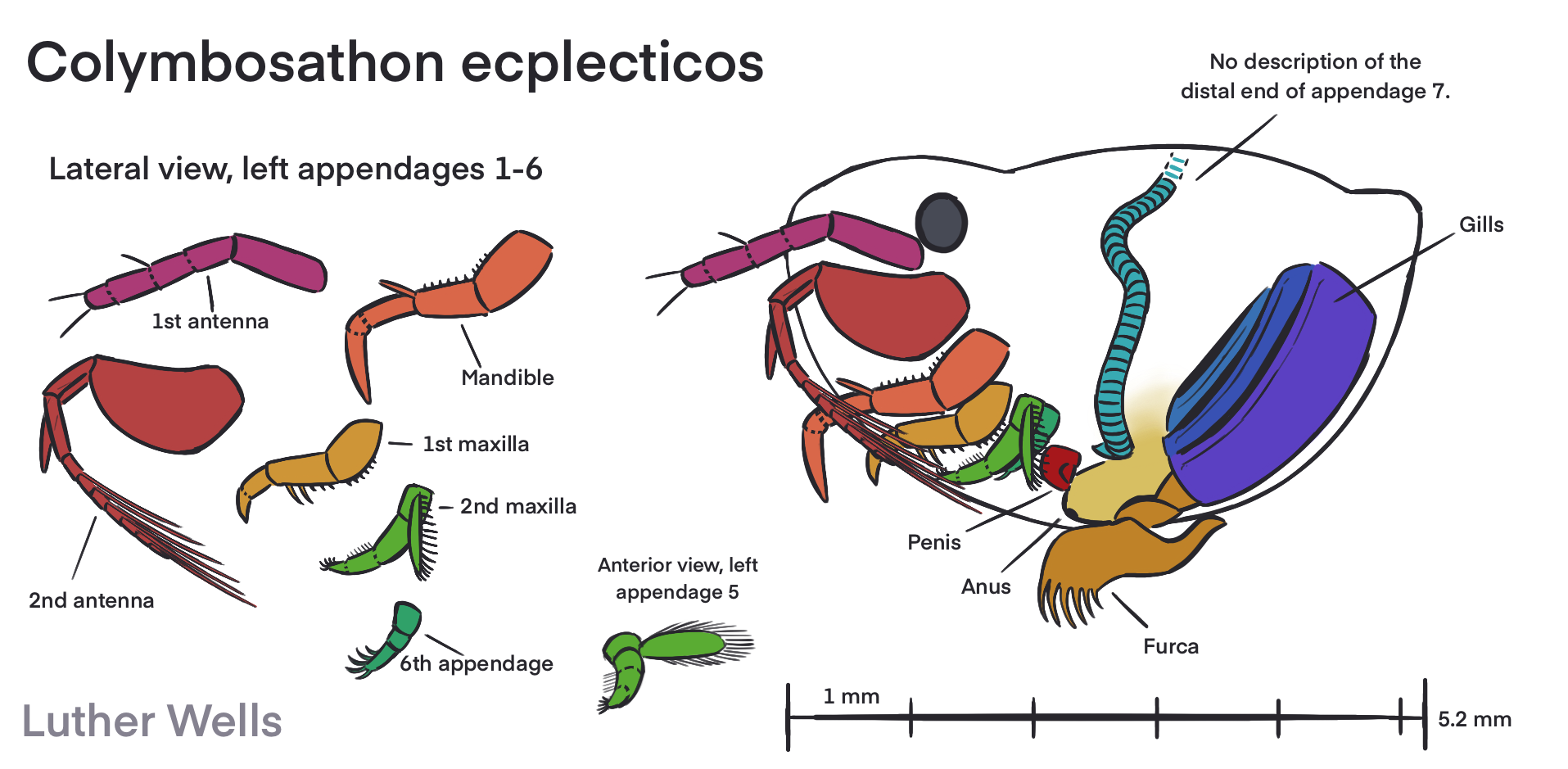
A diagrammatic reconstruction of Colymbosathon's anatomy.

Colymbosathon is very similar in morphology to modern ostracods. A notable difference between Colymbosathon and modern ostracods is the presence of, "A sinuous fingerlike process of unknown homology [that] projects from the posterior part of the furca."

The carapace is about 5.2 millimetres (0.20 in) long and about 3.1 millimetres (0.12 in) in width and height.

The first antenna is flattened mediolaterally and has an unknown amount of podomeres. The second antenna has a large, "almond-shaped basipod". The second antenna's endopod is short, curved, and lacks discernable segmentation. The proximal half of the second antenna's exopod may be composed of two podomeres, and the distal half has 6-7 long setae that may correspond to segments.

The mandible has 8-10 medial endites on the limb stem, a short exopod, and a bent endopod that may have 2-3 podomeres, the middle of which may be short. The limb stem of the first maxilla has two long endites distally and a series of shorter ones proximally. The endopod may consist of two podomeres, and the presence of an exopod is not known. The second maxilla bears an epipod with 16 or more marginal processes. The endopod segments are unclear, but has five short processes at the distal end and a series of setiferous endites medially. The sixth appendage is short and has 5-6 processes on the distal end.

The seventh appendage is vermiform and wraps around to the top of the body, similar to other myodocopids. The distal end of this appendage is not described.
