= Robustaurila assimilis =

Scientific classification
- Kingdom: Animalia
- Phylum: Arthropoda
- Class: Ostracoda
- Order: Podocopida
- Superfamily: Cytheroidea
- Family: Hemicytheridae
- Genus: Robustaurila
- Species: R. assimilis

Binomial name
- Robustaurila assimilis (Kajiyama, 1913)

Synonyms
- Mutilus assimilis (Kajiyama, 1913); Cythereis assimilis Kajiyama, 1913

Species of ostracod

Robustaurila assimilis is a species of ostracod in the family Hemicytheridae, that was first described in 1913 by Kajiyama as Cythereis assimilis. In 1982 Michiko Yajima transferred it to her newly described genus, Robustaurila, to give the current name Robustaurila assimilis.

This ostracod lives in marine waters, off the coasts of Korea, and Japan.
