= Pauline (crustacean) =

Pauline Temporal range: Telychian–Wenlock

Scientific classification
- Kingdom: Animalia
- Phylum: Arthropoda
- Class: Ostracoda
- Order: Myodocopida
- Family: Cylindroleberididae
- Genus: †Pauline; Siveter, Briggs, Siveter, Sutton & Joomun, 2012

Species
- †Pauline avibella Siveter, Briggs, Siveter, Sutton & Joomun, 2012; †Pauline nivisis Perrier, Siveter, Williams & Lane, 2014

Extinct genus of seed shrimps

Pauline is a fossil genus of ostracods from the Silurian. Genus contains two species: Pauline avibella found in 425-million-year-old rocks in the Herefordshire Lagerstätte in England near the Welsh Border and Pauline nivisis, known from the Lower Silurian (upper Telychian) Pentamerus Bjerge Formation of north Greenland.
