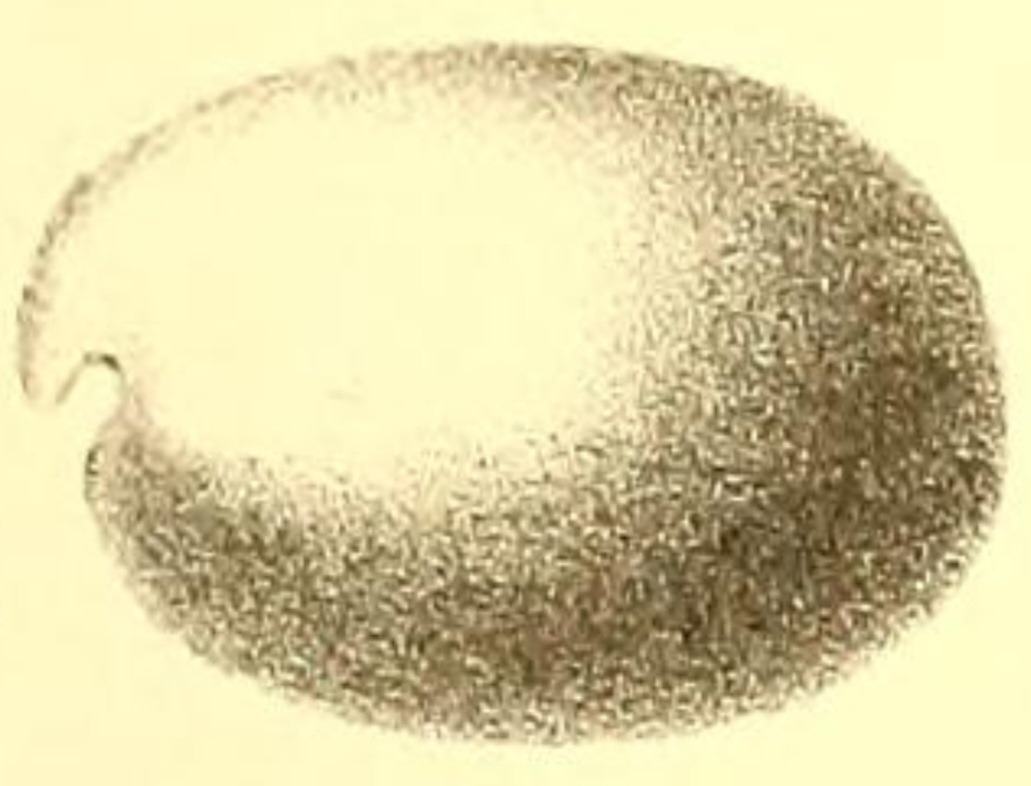
- Illustration of the left valve of E. radiata

Scientific classification
- Domain: Eukaryota
- Kingdom: Animalia
- Phylum: Arthropoda
- Class: Ostracoda
- Order: Myodocopida
- Family: Cypridinidae
- Subfamily: Cypridininae
- Genus: †Eocypridina; Kesling & Ploch, 1960

Type species
- †Eocypridina campbelli Kesling & Ploch, 1960

Other species
- †E. aciculata Scott & Summerson, 1943; †E. radiata Jones, Kirkby & Brady, 1874

Synonyms
- synonyms of Eocypridina: Radiicypridina Bless, 1973; synonyms of E. aciculata: Cypridina aciculata Scott & Summerson, 1943; synonyms of E. radiata: Cypridina radiata Jones, Kirkby & Brady, 1874; Radiicypridina radiata Bless, 1973

= Eocypridina =

Eocypridina Temporal range: Devonian–Early Triassic

Fossil genus of seed shrimps

Eocypridina is an extinct genus of ostracods which lived from the Devonian to early Triassic periods in the United States and Scotland. It was first named in 1960, with E. campbelli as its type species.

== Discovery and naming ==
Fossils of Eocypridina have been described decades before the genus was named. In 1874, a monograph by Jones, Kirkby & Brady was published in which they named the species Cypridina radiata, believing it was most similar to other species of Cypridina. The type series of C. radiata was collected from the "Upper Coal-measures" of the Airdrie Blackbank Ironstone in Glasgow, Scotland by John Young.

The genus Eocypridina was erected in 1960 by Kesling and Ploch, with E. campbelli as its type species. They collected several specimens from sediments of the Blackiston Formation on the north bank of the Ohio River in Indiana, and deposited them in the University of Michigan Museum of Paleontology. The carapace of a female (UMMP 40548) was chosen as the holotype of this species, while several other specimens were designated as paratypes. The generic name combines a Greek ἠώς, (eos), "dawn", with the name Cypridina, referring to how it is an early relative of the extant genus. The specific name honors Guy Campbell, who collected the studied specimens.

In 1973, Martin J. M. Bless established a new genus of ostracods which he named Radiicypridina. He justified the naming of this genus based on the presence of rosettes with needle-shaped radii in the calcareous layer and the complex pattern of muscle scars. However, I. G. Sohn pointed out in his 1977 publication that the rosettes are not an anatomical feature and thus is not a valid feature for genus recognition. In addition, the muscle scars were not significantly different from those of Eocypridina, so Radiicypridina was declared a junior synonym of it.
