= Muellerina (crustacean) =

Scientific classification
- Domain: Eukaryota
- Kingdom: Animalia
- Phylum: Arthropoda
- Class: Ostracoda
- Order: Podocopida
- Family: Hemicytheridae
- Genus: Muellerina; Bassiouni, 1965

Type species
- †Cythere latimarginata Speyer, 1863

Genus of seed shrimps

Muellerina is a genus of ostracods in the family Hemicytheridae. The name is a tribute to German zoologist specializing in ostracod biology Christian Gustav Wilhelm Müller (1857-1940).
