= Acetabulastoma =

Scientific classification
- Domain: Eukaryota
- Kingdom: Animalia
- Phylum: Arthropoda
- Class: Ostracoda
- Order: Podocopida
- Family: Paradoxostomatidae
- Genus: Acetabulastoma; Schornikov, 1970

Genus of ostracods

Acetabulastoma is a genus of ostracods belonging to the family Paradoxostomatidae.

== Taxonomy ==
The following 12 species and 2 subspecies are recognised in the genus Acetabulastoma:

- Acetabulastoma arcticum Schornikov, 1970
- Acetabulastoma californica Watling, 1972
- Acetabulastoma hyperboreum (Scott, 1899)
  - Acetabulastoma hyperboreum hyperboreum (Scott, 1899)
- Acetabulastoma kozloffi Hart, 1971
- Acetabulastoma kurilense Schornikov, 1970
- Acetabulastoma littorale Schornikov, 1970
  - Acetabulastoma littorale robustum Schornikov, 1970
- Acetabulastoma longum Schornikov, 1970
- Acetabulastoma obtusatum Schornikov, 1974
- Acetabulastoma rhomboideum Schornikov, 1970
- Acetabulastoma rostratum (Sars, 1866)
- Acetabulastoma striungulum Smith, 1952
- Acetabulastoma subrhomboideum Schornikov, 1974
