= Photeros =

Scientific classification
- Domain: Eukaryota
- Kingdom: Animalia
- Phylum: Arthropoda
- Class: Ostracoda
- Order: Myodocopida
- Family: Cypridinidae
- Subfamily: Cypridininae
- Genus: Photeros; Cohen & Morin, 2010

Genus of crustaceans

Photeros is a genus in the Cypridinidae. The genus contains bioluminescent species, and is one of the genera of bioluminescent ostracods which show stereotyped bioluminescent mating signals.
