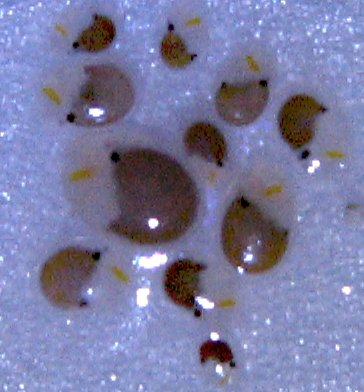

Scientific classification
- Domain: Eukaryota
- Kingdom: Animalia
- Phylum: Arthropoda
- Class: Ostracoda
- Order: Myodocopida
- Family: Cypridinidae
- Subfamily: Cypridininae
- Tribe: Cypridinini
- Genus: Vargula; Skogsberg, 1920

= Vargula =

Genus of crustaceans

Vargula is a genus in the Cypridinidae. The genus contains bioluminescent species. Vargula hilgendorfii (formerly Cypridina hilgendorfii), native to Japan, is likely the best-studied Vargula. Some species currently within Vargula (e.g. Vargula tsujii) may be split into their own genus.
