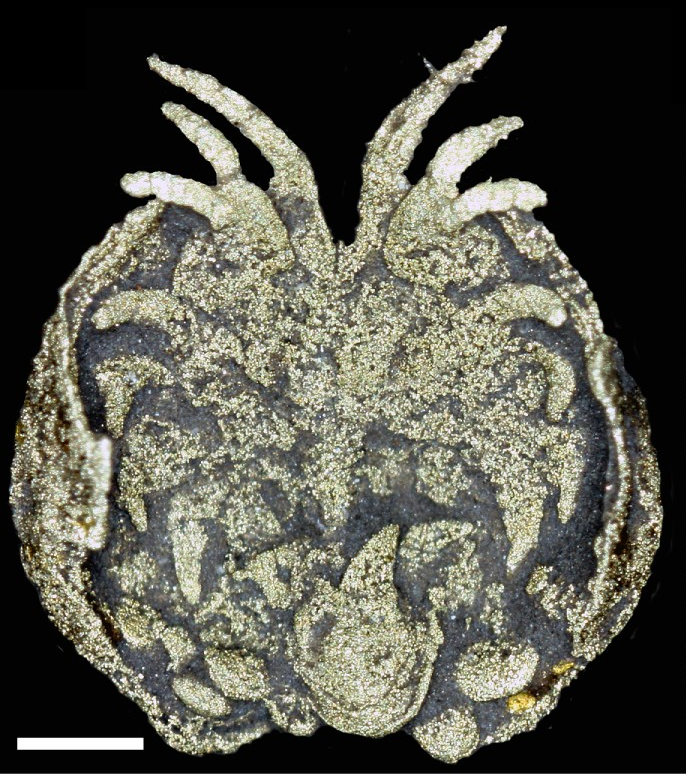
- Fossil specimen

Scientific classification
- Kingdom: Animalia
- Phylum: Arthropoda
- Class: Ostracoda
- Order: Myodocopida
- Family: incertae sedis
- Genus: †Luprisca; Siveter et al., 2014
- Species: †L. incuba

Binomial name
- †Luprisca incuba Siveter et al, 2014

= Luprisca =

Luprisca Temporal range: Ordovician, 450 Ma

Extinct species of seed shrimp

Luprisca incuba is an extinct species of ostracod crustacean. It was described as a new species in 2014, following discovery and analysis of fossilized specimens in mudstone rocks from New York, United States. A team of researchers from the universities of Yale and Kansas, Oxford and the Japan Agency of Marine Science and Technology made the discovery.

== Etymology ==
The genus and species name were named after Lucina, the goddess of childbirth in Roman mythology, and incuba, implying the mother was incubating her eggs.

== Description ==
With 1.2 to 2.5 millimetres (0.047 to 0.098 in) long carapace, it is suggested that the animal was intact with a shell along with the delicate parts of limbs and embryos within the shell. The fossil was preserved in pyrite and was examined using X-Ray and CT Scan techniques.

== Habitat and behavior ==
This species was discovered in the mudstone rocks from New York State, from a rock layer called the Lorraine Group. The discovery was said to be the earliest evidence for parental care in the fossils of ostracod. Although some reported this discovery as "oldest parenting of fossil record", however some Cambrian fossil records with brood care, like Waptia are known.

“The mother kept the eggs and the hatchlings in brooding pouches within her body until the young ones were big enough to go out on their own,” David Siveter, professor of geology at the University of Leicester in the UK who led the study, told The Telegraph India. A research paper by Siveter and his colleagues describing the ostracod fossils was published in the journal Current Biology.
