= Robustaurila =

Scientific classification
- Kingdom: Animalia
- Phylum: Arthropoda
- Class: Ostracoda
- Order: Podocopida
- Suborder: Cytherocopina
- Superfamily: Cytheroidea
- Family: Hemicytheridae
- Genus: Robustaurila; Yajima, 1982

Type species
- Robustaurila assimilis (Kajiyama, 1913)

Genus of seed shrimps

Robustaurila is a genus of ostracods in the family Hemicytheridae, that was first described in 1982 by Michiko Yajima.

These ostracods live in marine waters.

== Species ==
Species listed in WoRMS:

- Robustaurila assimilis (Kajiyama, 1913)
- Robustaurila ishizakii (Okubo, 1980)
- Robustaurila jollaensis (Leroy, 1943)
- Robustaurila kianohybrida (Hu, 1982)
- Robustaurila similis
- Robustaurila splendideornata
