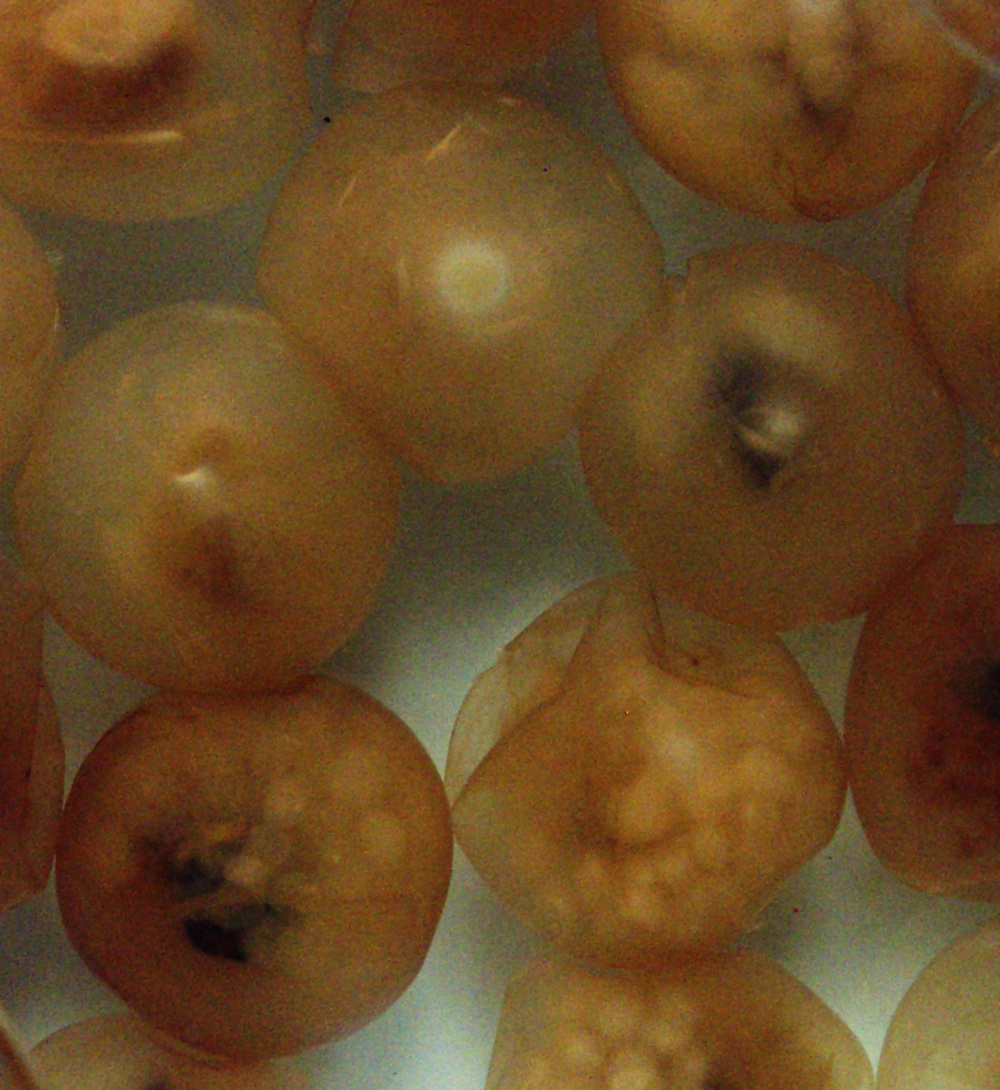
- Preserved specimens at Oxford University Museum

Scientific classification
- Kingdom: Animalia
- Phylum: Arthropoda
- Class: Ostracoda
- Order: Myodocopida
- Family: Cypridinidae
- Subfamily: Cypridininae
- Tribe: Gigantocypridinini; Hartmann, 1974
- Genus: Gigantocypris; Müller, 1895

Species
- See text

= Gigantocypris =

Genus of seed shrimps

Gigantocypris, sometimes known as giant ostracod or giant seed shrimp, is a genus of ostracod crustaceans in family Cypridinidae, and among the most well-known members of the class Ostracoda (together with Vargula hilgendorfii). Its members are extremely large for ostracods, measuring up to 3.2 cm (1.3 in) across, have a globular shape, are typically semi-transparent orange or reddish, and have a large pair of mirror-like eyes that are used to locate their small animal prey. They are found worldwide in dark, deep and cold oceans.

== Range and habitat ==
Gigantocypris are ubiquitous in open oceans around the world, ranging from tropical to polar regions. Although locally abundant, the distributions of the individual species are often not well known. Gigantocypris dracontovalis is found worldwide, mostly deeper than the other species. Gigantocypris agassizi is essentially a widespread Pacific species, and Gigantocypris muelleri a widespread Atlantic and Southern Ocean species, but there are also a few possible records of the former in the Atlantic, and a few records of the latter in the Pacific and Indian oceans. Gigantocypris australis and Gigantocypris danae are only known from the Southwestern Pacific and Western Indian Ocean, respectively.

Gigantocypris have been reported at depths between 150 and 3,500 m (490–11,480 ft). They are typically found from 600 to 2,300 m (2,000–7,500 ft). There are indications that young tend to occur shallower than adults. They live in water that is dark (below the sunlight zone) and cold, less than 15 °C (59 °F), with most records between about 2 and 5 °C (36–41 °F). In water that is 15 °C (59 °F) or warmer, their swimming becomes weak and erratic.

== Appearance and behavior ==
Gigantocypris include the largest ostracods, at up to 3.2 cm (1.3 in) across. The largest are G. agassizi and G. australis. Another relatively large species is G. muelleri, which reaches up to 2 cm (0.8 in), but typically is about 1.0–1.8 cm (0.4–0.7 in), with Southern Ocean individuals averaging largest. The smallest species, such as G. dracontovalis, typically reach 0.8–1.2 cm (0.3–0.5 in). Females grow larger than males.

Their body is suspended within a semi-translucent, globular carapace. Depending on the exact species, living individuals typically are orange, orange-red or violet-red, but they can also be colourless. Specimens preserved in alcohol become whitish. Calcium carbonate is absent in their shell, and their body is fragile with a watery body that often is damaged when collected for scientific studies. They have a water content of about 95%, far above that reported for other crustaceans and more similar to jellyfish.

Despite living in the darkness below the sunlight zone, they are equipped with a pair of large eyes which, rather than using lenses to focus light onto a retina, use parabolic mirrors. The parabolic mirror eyes typically have a diameter of about 3 mm (0.12 in), look out through transparent sections of the carapace, and appear silvery or golden in colour. Their eyes are the most elaborate known from ostracods, and are better at gathering light than the eyes of any other animal (although the resolution of the image produced by the eyes is likely poor). It is thought that Gigantocypris use them to find bioluminescent prey animals. They are known to feed on other ostracods, copepods, arrow worms and small fish (primarily fish larvae). Exactly how they catch their prey is unclear, but studies show that the outer part of their mandibles can be extended out through the slit (opening) of their globular carapace. Gigantocypris swim by "rowing" with two featherlike antennae, each with nine long setae. Another pair of long antennae, believed to be used for sensing, extend out in front of the animal when swimming. Both their swimming and sensing antennae can be retracted into the globular carapace through its slit. They have a near-neutral buoyancy (marginally negative, sinking) and are able to swim smoothly (not in jerks) at a relatively high speed, indicating that they are active predators. It is speculated that their relatively large heart—the largest among ostracods in both total and relative size—supports their active behavior, as well as their large eyes. When brought to the ocean surface, they have a slightly positive (floating) buoyancy, and their swimming is highly unstable and tumbling, but they are able to re-adjust to a near-neutral buoyancy and normal swimming pattern in less than a day. They change their buoyancy by adjusting the sulphate content of their haemolymph. They sometimes fall prey to other animals such as squid, fish like grenadiers and chub mackerels, and prions.

The female Gigantocypris has a brood pouch, located inside the carapace, in which the eggs and embryos develop. When "born", the young resemble miniature adults. Adult males are uncommon compared to adult females.

== Species ==
The World Register of Marine Species recognize six valid species in the genus Gigantocypris. One of these, G. pellucida (described simultaneously with G. agassizi, both based on East Pacific specimens), is often not considered valid. In contrast, possibly undescribed species are known, and Atlantic and Southern Ocean G. muelleri may represent separate species.

- Gigantocypris agassizi G. W. Müller, 1895
- Gigantocypris australis Poulsen, 1962
- Gigantocypris danae Poulsen, 1962
- Gigantocypris dracontovalis Cannon, 1940
- Gigantocypris muelleri Skogsberg, 1920
- Gigantocypris pellucida G. W. Müller, 1895
