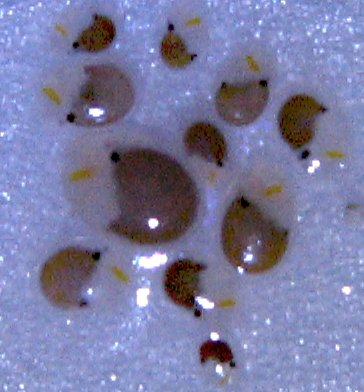

Scientific classification
- Kingdom: Animalia
- Phylum: Arthropoda
- Class: Ostracoda
- Order: Myodocopida
- Family: Cypridinidae
- Genus: Vargula
- Species: V. hilgendorfii

Binomial name
- Vargula hilgendorfii G. W. Müller, 1890

Synonyms
- Cypridina hilgendorfii

= Vargula hilgendorfii =

Species of seed shrimp

Vargula hilgendorfii, also known as sea-firefly, is a bioluminescent species of ostracod crustacean. It is the only member of genus Vargula to inhabit Japanese waters; all other members of its genus inhabit the Gulf of Mexico, the Caribbean Sea, and waters off the coast of California. V. hilgendorfii was formerly more common, but its numbers have fallen significantly.

== Description ==
V. hilgendorfii is a small animal, only 3 millimetres long. It is nocturnal and lives in the sand at the bottom of shallow water. At night, it feeds actively.

=== Bioluminescence ===
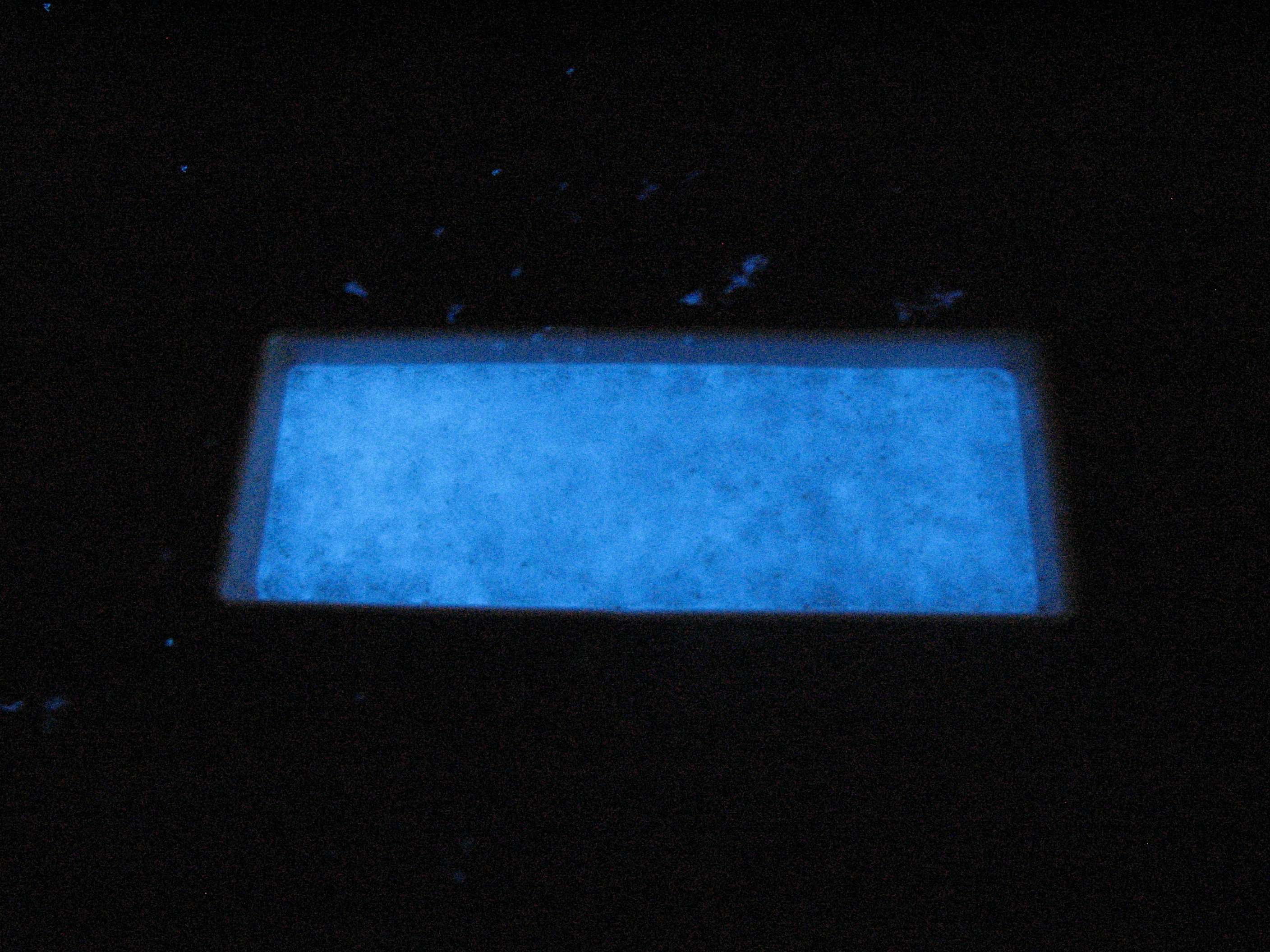
V. hilgendorfii glowing

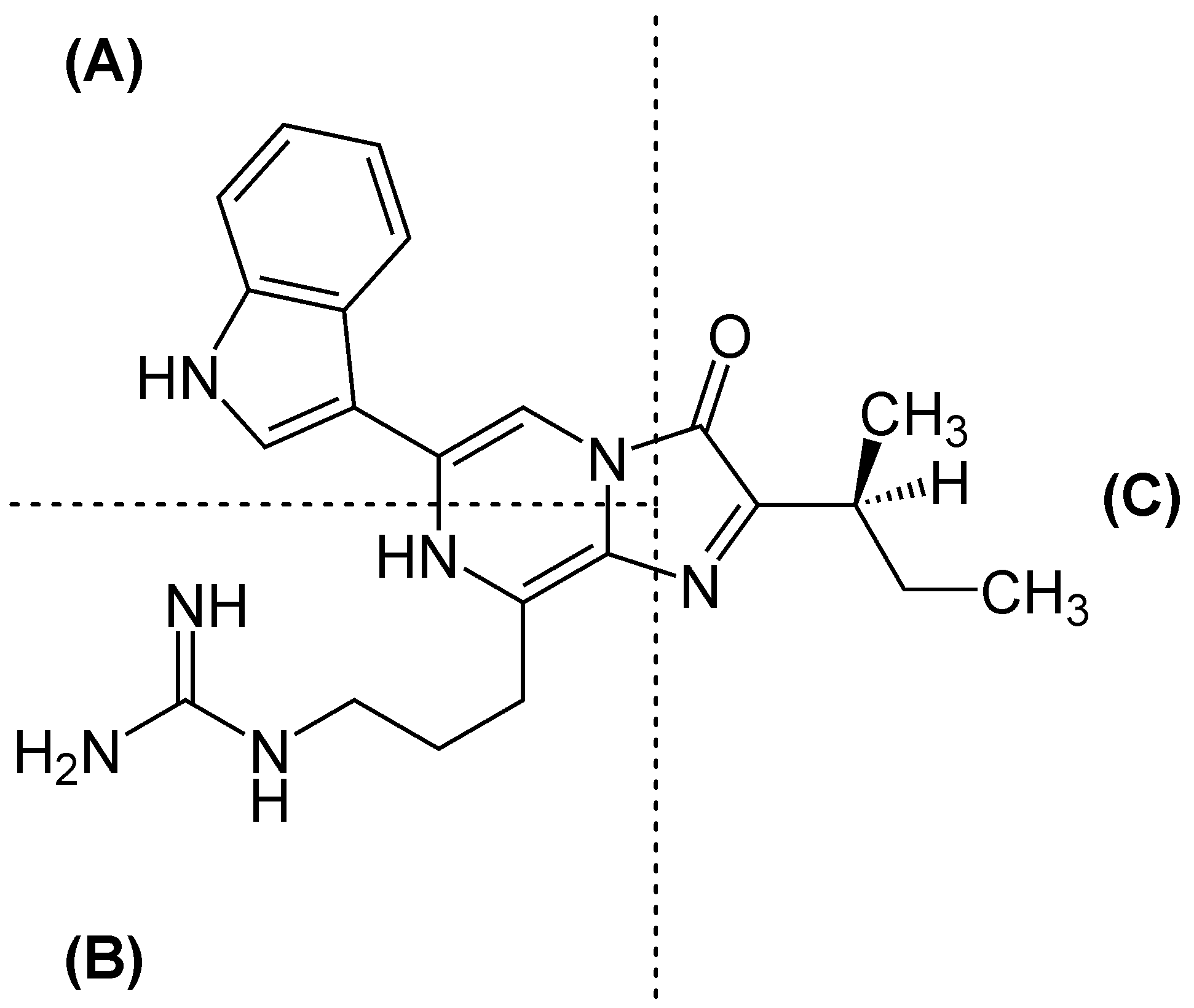
The luciferin from Vargula hilgendorfii

V. hilgendorfii is known for its bioluminescence. It produces a blue-coloured light by a specialized chemical reaction of the substrate luciferin and the enzyme luciferase. The luciferase enzyme consists of a 555-amino acid-long peptide with a molecular mass of 61627 u, while the luciferine vargulin has only a mass of 405.5 u. A suggested biosynthesis for vargulin divides the molecule into a tryptophan, an arginine and an isoleucine subunit.

The maximum in the wavelength of the luminescence is dependent on pH and salinity of the water in which the reaction takes place. It varies between 448 and 463 nm, with the maximum being at 452 nm in sea water. The substrate oxidizes when ejected from the upper-lip gland, with luciferase as a catalyst. The reaction produces carbon dioxide, oxyluciferin, and blue light. As an intermediate, a 1,2-dioxetane ring is formed; this intermediate is also formed in reaction of other bioluminescent lifeforms and also in the chemoluminescence of glow sticks.

== Distribution ==
V. hilgendorfii is indigenous to the water off the southern Japanese coast. DNA and RNA analysis indicated that V. hilgendorfii migrated slowly northward after the last ice age. The poor swimming abilities and the fact the eggs are hatched in the uterus and live young are born limit the ability to migrate.

== History ==
The species was first described by Gustav Wilhelm Müller in 1890. He named the species after the zoologist Franz Martin Hilgendorf (1839–1904). The bioluminescence of V. hilgendorfii was a research topic for a long time; the first research dates back to the year 1917.

During World War II, the Japanese army sometimes used dried sea-firefly as a light source to discreetly read maps in their dim light. In 1962, the name of the species was changed from Cypridina hilgendorfii to Vargula hilgendorfii. In 1968, Japanese scientists were able to determine the structure of the luciferin vargulin.
