= Enewton =

Scientific classification
- Domain: Eukaryota
- Kingdom: Animalia
- Phylum: Arthropoda
- Class: Ostracoda
- Order: Myodocopida
- Family: Cypridinidae
- Subfamily: Cypridininae
- Genus: Enewton; Cohen & Morin, 2010

Genus of crustaceans

Enewton is a genus in the family Cypridinidae. The genus contains bioluminescent species, and in particular is one of the Caribbean genera of bioluminescent ostracods that perform stereotyped bioluminescent mating displays.
