= Gustav Wilhelm Müller =

German zoologist

Christian Gustav Wilhelm Müller
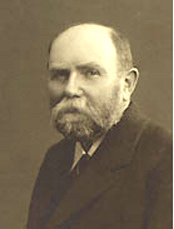
- Born: February 17, 1857; Mühlberg, Thuringia, Kingdom of Prussia
- Died: February 18, 1940 (aged 83)
- Scientific career
- Fields: Zoology
- Institutions: University of Greifswald

Christian Gustav Wilhelm Müller (17 February 1857 in Mühlberg near Erfurt – 18 February 1940) was a German zoologist specializing in Ostracoda.

In 1895 he succeeded Carl Eduard Adolph Gerstaecker as director of the zoological museum at Greifswald, a position he maintained until 1923.

He was the taxonomic authority of numerous taxa in Ostracoda; a few examples being the subfamily Conchoeciinae and the genera Archiconchoecia, Cytherois and Stenocypria. In 1965, the genus Muellerina Bassiouni (family Hemicytheridae) was named in his honor.

== Written works ==
- Neue Cypridiniden, 1891 - New Cypridinidae.
- Die Ostracoden des Golfes von Neapel und der angrenzenden Meeres-Abschnitte, 1894 - Ostracods from the Gulf of Naples and adjacent marine areas.
- Ostracoda, 1894 - Ostracoda.
- Deutschlands Süswasser-Ostracoden, 1900 - German freshwater ostracods.
- Die Ostracoden der Siboga-Expedition, 1906 - Ostracoda from the Siboga Expedition.
- Ostracoden aus Java, 1906 - Ostracods of Java.
- Die Ostracoden der deutschen Südpolar-Expedition, 1908 (In: Erich von Drygalski, Deutsche Südpolar-Expedition, 1901-1903). Ostracods from the German South Polar Expedition.

He was author of the section on ostracods in the series Das Tierreich (Das Tierreich/ 31 : Crustacea, Ostracoda / bearb. von G. W. Müller, 1912).
