= Paradoxostomatidae =

Scientific classification
- Kingdom: Animalia
- Phylum: Arthropoda
- Clade: Pancrustacea
- Class: Ostracoda
- Order: Podocopida
- Family: Paradoxostomatidae

Family of crustaceans

Paradoxostomatidae is a family of ostracods belonging to the order Podocopida.

== Genera ==
Genera:

- Acetabulastoma Schornikov, 1970
- Asterositus Tanaka & Arai, 2017
- Austroparadoxostoma Hartmann, 1979
