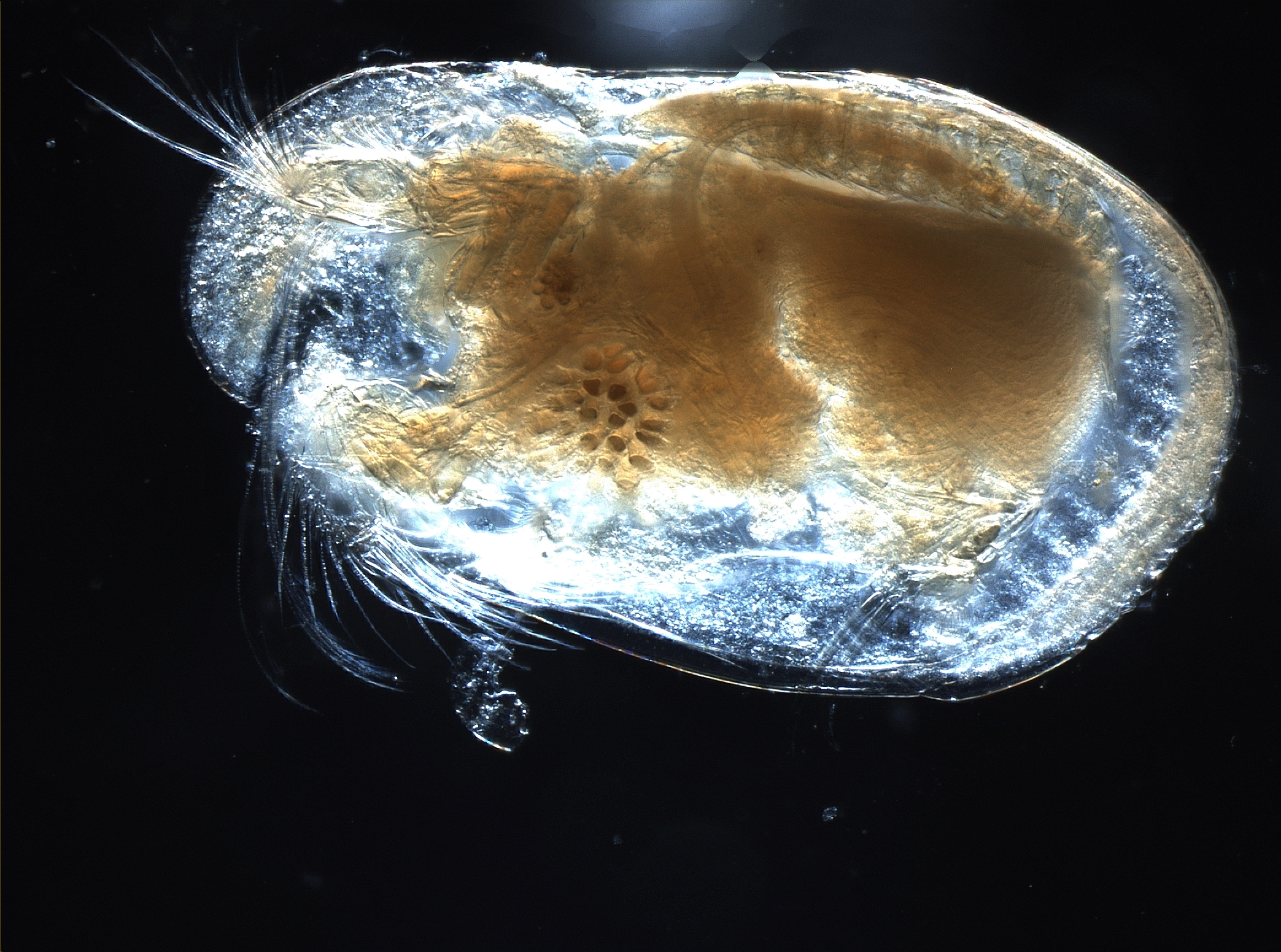
- Ostracod

Scientific classification
- Kingdom: Animalia
- Phylum: Arthropoda
- Clade: Pancrustacea
- Class: Ostracoda
- Order: Myodocopida
- Superfamily: Cylindroleberidoidea; Müller, 1906
- Family: Cylindroleberididae; Müller, 1906

Subfamilies
- Asteropteroninae Kornicker, 1981; Cyclasteropinae Poulsen, 1965; Cylindroleberidinae Müller, 1906; Macroasteropteroninae Karanovic & Lörz, 2012; genera incertae sedis; †Colymbosathon Siveter, Sutton, Briggs & Siveter, 2003; †Juraleberis Vannier & Siveter, 1995; †Nasunaris Siveter, Briggs, Siveter & Sutton, 2010; †Pauline Siveter, Briggs, Siveter, Sutton & Joomun, 2012

= Cylindroleberididae =

Cylindroleberididae Temporal range: Lower Silurian–Recent

Family of seed shrimps

Cylindroleberididae is a family of ostracods that shows remarkable morphological diversity. The defining feature is the possession of gills: 7–8 leaf-like pairs at the posterior of the body. Other features common to all species in the family include a "baleen-comb" on both the maxilla and the fifth limb, a sword-shaped coxal endite on the mandible, and the triaenid bristles on the basal endites of the mandible.

Species of the Cylindroleberididae are found in marine areas, from shallow waters to depths of more than 4,500 metres (14,800 ft). Most species are approximately 2 millimetres (0.08 in) long. In 2006, there were 219 described species.

A fossil discovered in 2003 with preserved soft parts has been assigned to the Cylindroleberididae. The fossil appears to have gills and is thought to date from 425 million years ago.

== Subtaxa ==
Cylindroleberididae contains the following subfamilies and genera.

- Asteropteroninae Kornicker, 1981
  - Actinoseta Kornicker, 1958
  - Asteropteron Skogsberg, 1920
  - Asteropterygion Kornicker, 1981
  - Microasteropteron Poulsen, 1965
  - Omegasterope Kornicker, 1981
  - Pteromeniscus Kornicker, 1981
  - †Siveterella Kornicker & Sohn, 2000
  - †Triadocypris Weitschat, 1983
  - †Triadogigantocypris Monostori, 1991
  - Asteropella Poulsen, 1965 (nomen nudum)
- Cyclasteropinae Poulsen, 1965
  - Alphaleberis Kornicker, 1981
  - Amboleberis Kornicker, 1981
  - Cyclasterope Brady, 1897
  - Cycloleberis Skogsberg, 1920
  - †Eocypridina Kesling & Ploch, 1960
  - Leuroleberis Kornicker, 1981
  - †Mesoleberis Kornicker, van bakel, Fraaije & Jagt, 2006
  - †Radiicypridina Bless, 1973
  - Tetraleberis Kornicker, 1981
- Cylindroleberidinae Müller, 1906
  - Archasterope Poulsen, 1965
  - †Asteropina Strand, 1928
  - Bathyleberis Kornicker, 1975
  - Bruuniella Poulsen, 1965
  - Cylindroleberis Brady, 1867
  - Diasterope Kornicker, 1975
  - Dolasterope Poulsen, 1965
  - Domromeus Kornicker, 1989
  - Empoulsenia Kornicker, 1975
  - Heptonema Poulsen, 1965
  - Homasterope Kornicker, 1975
  - Monasterope Kornicker, 1991
  - Parasterope Kornicker, 1975
  - Philippiella Poulsen, 1965
  - Polyleberis Kornicker, 1974
  - Postasterope Kornicker, 1986
  - Prionotoleberis Kornicker, 1974
  - Skogsbergiella Kornicker, 1975
  - Synasterope Kornicker, 1975
  - Xandarasterope Kornicker in Kornicker & Poore, 1996
  - Xenoleberis Kornicker, 1994
- Macroasteropteroninae Karanovic & Lörz, 2012
  - Macroasteropteron Kornicker, 1994
- genera incertae sedis
  - †Colymbosathon Siveter, Sutton, Briggs & Siveter, 2003
  - †Juraleberis Vannier & Siveter, 1995
  - †Nasunaris Siveter, Briggs, Siveter & Sutton, 2010
  - †Pauline Siveter, Briggs, Siveter, Sutton & Joomun, 2012
