= Hemicytheridae =

Scientific classification
- Kingdom: Animalia
- Phylum: Arthropoda
- Class: Ostracoda
- Order: Podocopida
- Suborder: Cytherocopina
- Superfamily: Cytheroidea
- Family: Hemicytheridae; Puri, 1953

Family of crustaceans

Hemicytheridae is a family of ostracods belonging to the order Podocopida.

Species of this family are found worldwide, in marine environments, and in brackish and fresh waters.

== Genera ==
Genera listed by WoRMS:

- Ambostracon Hazel, 1962
- Anterocythere McKenzie & Swain, 1967
- Australicythere Benson, 1964
- Baffinicythere Hazel, 1967
- Bensonocythere Hazel, 1967
- Bosasella Bonaduce, 1985
- Caudites Coryell & Fields, 1937
- Collarodontia Jellinek, 1993
- Coquimba Ohmert, 1968
- Cornucoquimba Ohmert, 1968
- Daishakacythere Irizuki, 1993
- Elofsonella Pokorny, 1955
- Falklandia Whatley, Chadwick, Coxill & Toy, 1987
- Finmarchinella Swain, 1963
- Galapagocythere Bate, Whittaker & Mayes, 1981
- Harleya Jellinek & Swanson, 2003
- Hemicythere Sars, 1925
- Hemicytheria Pokorny, 1955
- Subfamily Hemicytherinae Puri, 1953
  - Ambolus Ikeya, Jellinek & Tsukagoshi, 1998
  - Tribe Aurilini Puri, 1974
    - Auricythere Morais & Coimbra, 2014
    - Aurila Pokorný, 1955
  - Austroaurila Whatley, Chadwick, Coxill & Toy, 1987
  - Berguecythere Coimbra, Bottezini & Machado, 2013
  - Bulbocythere Coimbra & De Morais, 2016
  - Gerdella Bonaduce, Barra & Aiello, 1996
  - Kempfidea Weiss, 1998
- Heterocythereis Elofson, 1941
- Jacobella Swanson, 1979
- Laperousecythere Brouwers, 1993
- Matsucythere Hu & Tao, 2008
- Meridionalicythere Whatley, Chadwick, Coxill & Toy, 1987
- Muellerina Bassiouni, 1965
- Neobuntonia Hartmann, 1981
- Neocaudites Puri, 1960
- Neosinocythere Huang, 1985
- Nodocoquimba Hu & Tao, 2008
- Orionina Puri, 1954
- Parahermanites Hu & Tao, 2008
- Paraquadracythere Jellinek, 1993
- Patagonacythere Hartmann, 1962
- Procythereis Skogsberg, 1928
- Pseudoaurila Ishizaki & Kato, 1976
- Puriana Coryell & Fields, 1953
- Radimella Pokorny, 1969
- Reussicythere Bold, 1966
- RobustaurilaYajima, 1982
- Ruggiericythere Aiello, Coimbra & Barra, 2004
- Shungyangella Hu & Tao, 2008
- Sinocythere Hou in Hou et al., 1982
- Tyrrhenocythere Ruggieri, 1955
- Urocythereis Ruggieri, 1950
- Subfamily Urocytherideinae Hartmann & Puri, 1974
  - Thesceloscythere Whatley, Jones & Roberts, 2004
- Hermanites Puri, 1955
- Hartmannosa Özdikmen, 2009
