= Myodocopa =

Myodocopida

Scientific classification
- Domain: Eukaryota
- Kingdom: Animalia
- Phylum: Arthropoda
- Class: Ostracoda
- Subclass: Myodocopa; Sars, 1866

Subordinate taxa
- Family †Swainellidae Kornicker & Sohn, 2000; Superfamily †Cypridinelliformacea Kornicker & Sohn, 2000; Superfamily †Entomoconchacea Sylvester-Bradley, 1953; Superfamily †Entomozoacea Pribyl, 1950; Superfamily †Nodophilomedoidea Kornicker & Sohn, 2000; Order Halocyprida Dana, 1853; Order Myodocopida Sars, 1866

Subclass of seed shrimps

Traditionally, the Myodocopa and Podocopa have been classified as subclasses within the class Ostracoda, although there is some question about how closely related the two groups actually are. The Myodocopa are defined by possession of a poorly calcified carapace, and 8–9 articles in the exopod of the second antenna. The ventral margin of the carapace is not concave, and the valves do not overlap to a great extent.

Although the carapace of myodocopans is poorly calcified, some fossils are known for the group. (In contrast, thousands of fossil species are named for the Podocopa). Of particular interest are those fossils for which the internal body parts (and not just the carapace) are preserved. This provides a lot more information about the likely relatives to the fossil taxa, including relatives still alive today. Two recent fossils of much interest have been found from Silurian deposits (dated at 425 million years ago). These fossils have well preserved internal body parts.
