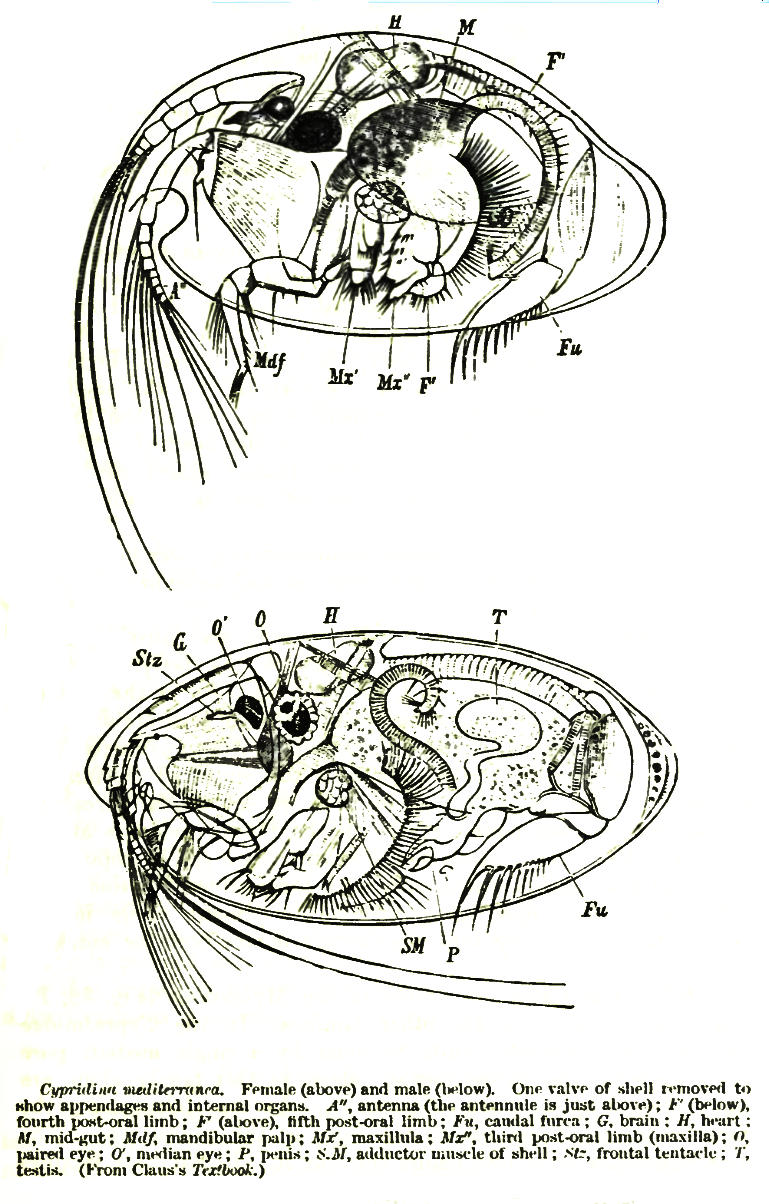
- Cypridina mediterranea

Scientific classification
- Kingdom: Animalia
- Phylum: Arthropoda
- Clade: Pancrustacea
- Class: Ostracoda
- Order: Myodocopida
- Superfamily: Cypridinoidea; Baird, 1850
- Family: Cypridinidae; Baird, 1850

= Cypridinidae =

Family of seed shrimps

Cypridinidae is a family of ostracods. About half of all known species are bioluminescent. Some use the light only for defence, others also for courtship displays. The lineages with sexually dimorphic bioluminescent displays have more species other lineages, which indicates that bioluminescent courtship could increase the diversification rates.

The family contains the following genera:

- Amphisiphonostra Poulsen, 1962
- Azygocypridina Sylvester-Bradley, 1950
- Bathyvargula Kornicker, 1968
- Codonocera Brady, 1902
- Cypridina Milne-Edwards, 1840
- Cypridinodes Brady, 1902
- Doloria Skogsberg, 1920
- Enewton Cohen & Morin, 2010
- Gigantocypris Skogsberg, 1920
- Hadacypridina Poulsen, 1962
- Isocypridina Kornicker, 1975
- Jimmorinia Cohen & Kornicker in Cohen, Kornicker & Iliffe, 2000
- Kornickeria Cohen & Morin, 1993
- Lowrya Parker, 1998
- Macrocypridina Skogsberg, 1920
- Maristella Reda et al., 2019
- Melavargula Poulsen, 1962
- Metavargula Kornicker, 1970
- Monopia Poulsen, 1962
- Paracypridina Poulsen, 1962
- Paradoloria Poulsen, 1962
- Paravargula Cohen & Kornicker, 1975
- Photeros Cohen & Morin, 2010
- Pseudodoloria Kornicker, 1994
- Pterocypridina Poulsen, 1962
- Rheina Kornicker, 1989
- Rugosidoloria Kornicker, 1975
- Sheina Harding, 1966
- Siphonostra Skogsberg, 1920
- Skogsbergia Kornicker, 1974
- Vargula Skogsberg, 1920
