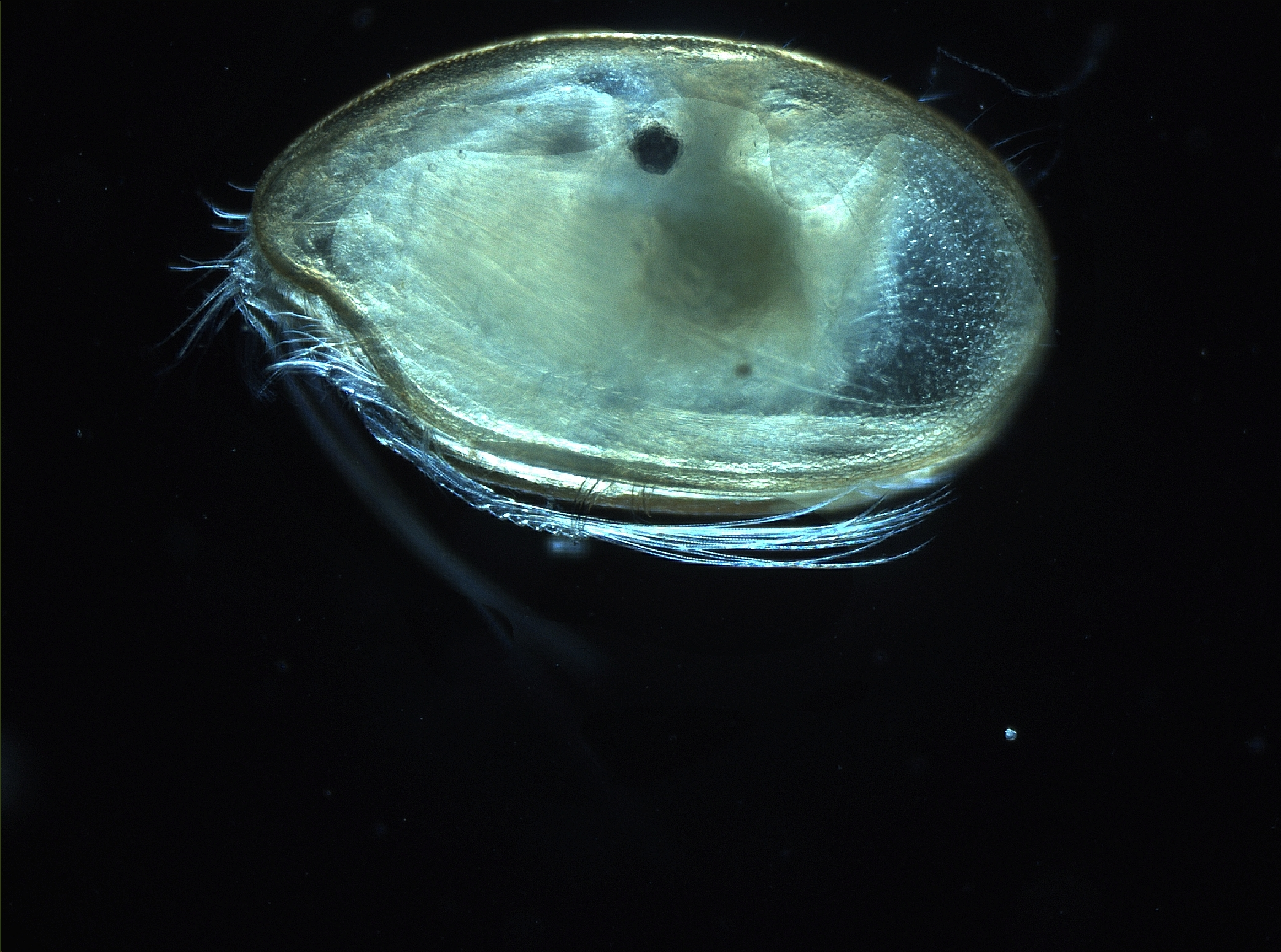
- A myodocopid ostracod from southern Australia

Scientific classification
- Kingdom: Animalia
- Phylum: Arthropoda
- Class: Ostracoda
- Subclass: Myodocopa
- Order: Myodocopida; Sars, 1866

Suborders
- †Entomozocopina; Myodocopina; †Paleomyodocopina; genus incertae sedis; †Luprisca (Siveter, Tanaka, Farrell, Martin, Siveter & Briggs, 2014)

= Myodocopida =

Order of seed shrimps

The Myodocopida is one of the two orders within the Myodocopa, in turn a subclass of the Ostracoda. The Myodocopida are distinguished by a worm-like seventh limb, and, usually, a rostrum above an incisure (notch) from which the antennae can protrude. Unlike other ostracods, many species of the Myodocopida have lateral compound eyes Research on the cypridinid species Macrocypridina castanea have shown that the ‘window’ above its eyes—a transparent area on the shell—contains a nanostructure that transmits an unusually high 99% of blue light (350–630 nm)—the predominant light in its environment—allowing it to efficiently reach the eyes. Over the last thirty years there has been much research into the morphology, behaviour and distribution of myodocopids. More recently, DNA sequences have been used to investigate the phylogeny of various groups.
