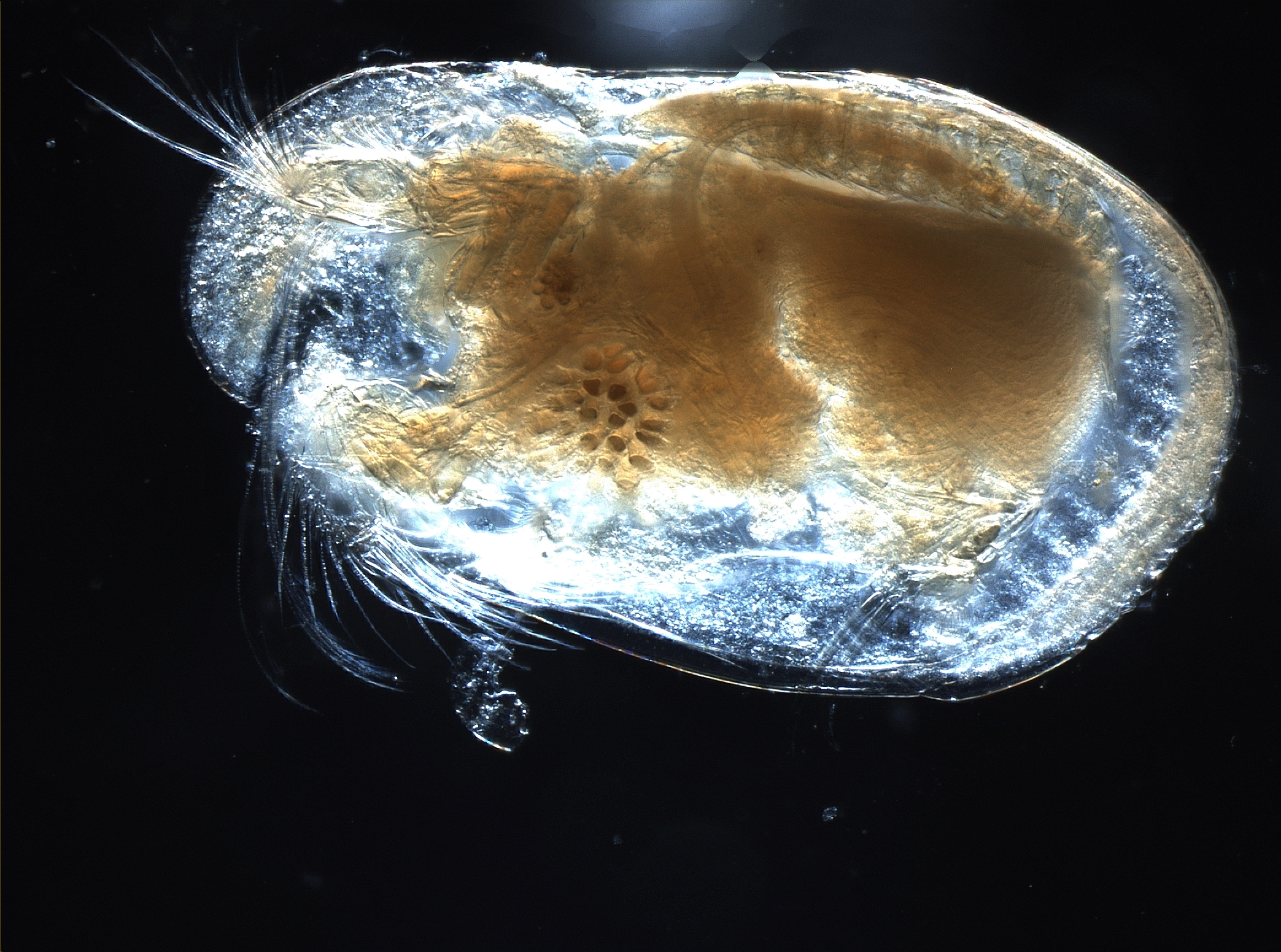

Scientific classification
- Kingdom: Animalia
- Phylum: Arthropoda
- Clade: Pancrustacea
- Superclass: Oligostraca
- Class: Ostracoda; Latreille, 1802

Subclasses and orders
- Myodocopa Sars, 1866; Myodocopida Sars, 1866; Halocyprida Dana, 1853; Podocopa Sars, 1866; Palaeocopida Henningsmoen, 1953; Platycopida Sars, 1866; Podocopida Sars, 1866

= Ostracod =

Ostracod Temporal range: Ordovician–Recent

Class of crustaceans

Ostracods, or ostracodes, are a class of the Crustacea (class Ostracoda), sometimes known as seed shrimp. Some 33,000 species (only 13,000 of which are extant) have been identified, grouped into 7 valid orders. They are small crustaceans, typically around 1 mm (0.04 in) in size, but varying from 0.2 to 32 mm (0.0079 to 1.3 in), the latter in the case of the marine Gigantocypris. The largest known freshwater species is Megalocypris princeps, which reach 8 mm in length. In most cases, their bodies are flattened from side to side and protected by a bivalve-like valve or "shell" made of chitin, and often calcium carbonate. The family Entocytheridae and many planktonic forms do not have calcium carbonate. The hinge of the two valves is in the upper (dorsal) region of the body. Ostracods are grouped together based on shell and soft part morphology, and molecular studies have not unequivocally supported the group's monophyly. They have a wide range of diets, and the class includes carnivores, herbivores, scavengers and filter feeders, but most ostracods are deposit feeders.

== Etymology ==
Ostracod comes from the Greek óstrakon meaning shell or tile.

== Fossils ==
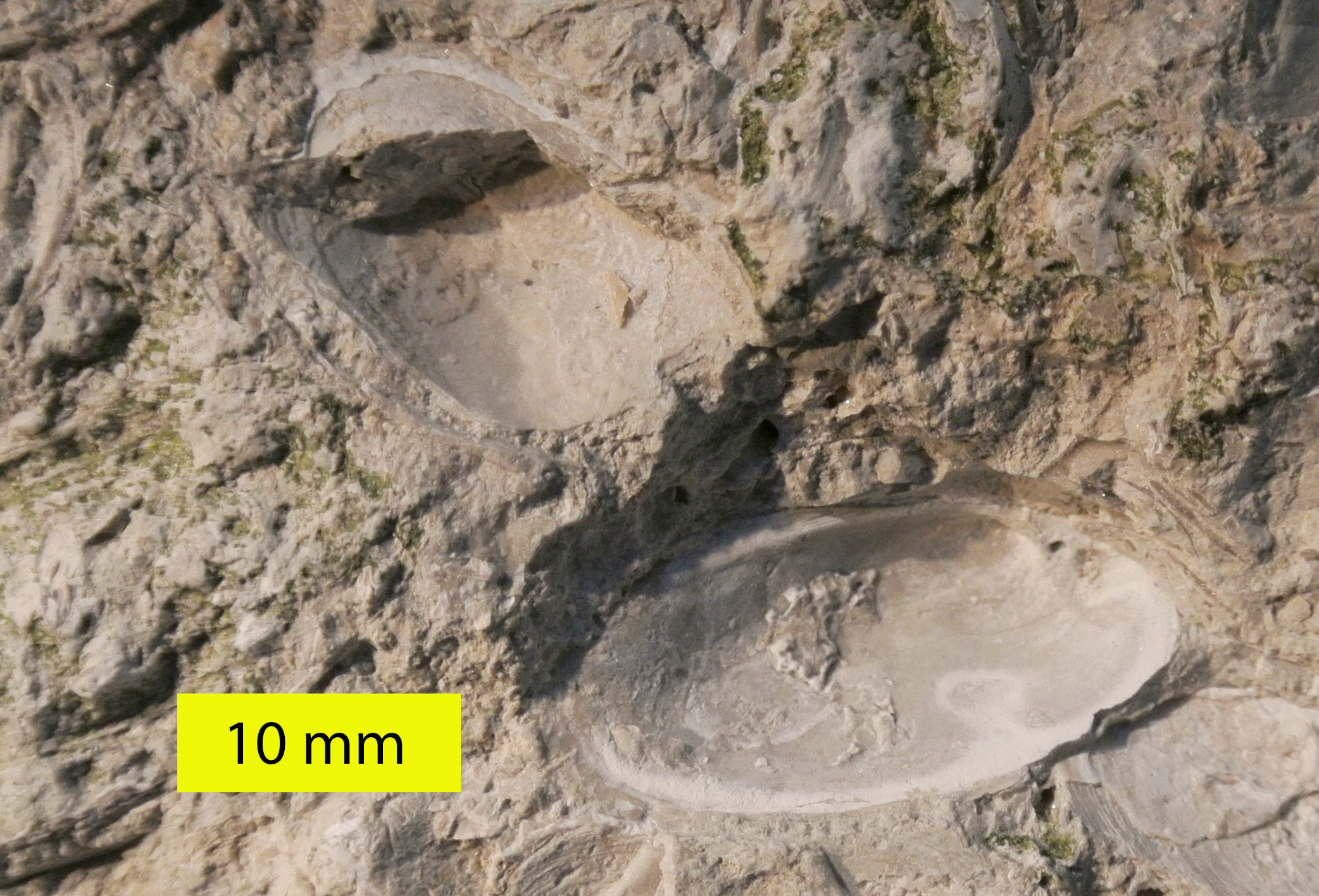
The large ostracod Herrmannina from the Silurian (Ludlow) Soeginina Beds (Paadla Formation) on eastern Saaremaa Island, Estonia

Ostracods are "by far the most common arthropods in the fossil record" with fossils being found from the early Ordovician to the present. An outline microfaunal zonal scheme based on both Foraminifera and Ostracoda was compiled by M. B. Hart. Freshwater ostracods have even been found in Baltic amber of Eocene age, having presumably been washed onto trees during floods.

Ostracods have been particularly useful for the biozonation of marine strata on a local or regional scale, and they are invaluable indicators of paleoenvironments because of their widespread occurrence, small size, easily preservable, generally moulted, calcified bivalve carapaces; the valves are a commonly found microfossil.

A find in Queensland, Australia, in 2013, announced in May 2014, at the Bicentennary Site in the Riversleigh World Heritage area, revealed both male and female specimens with very well preserved soft tissue. This set the Guinness World Record for the oldest penis, with the fossils estimated to be approximately 100 million years old. Males had observable sperm that is the oldest yet seen and, when analysed, showed internal structures and has been assessed as being the largest sperm (per body size) of any animal recorded. It was assessed that the fossilisation was achieved within several days, due to phosphorus in the bat droppings of the cave where the ostracods were living.

== Description ==
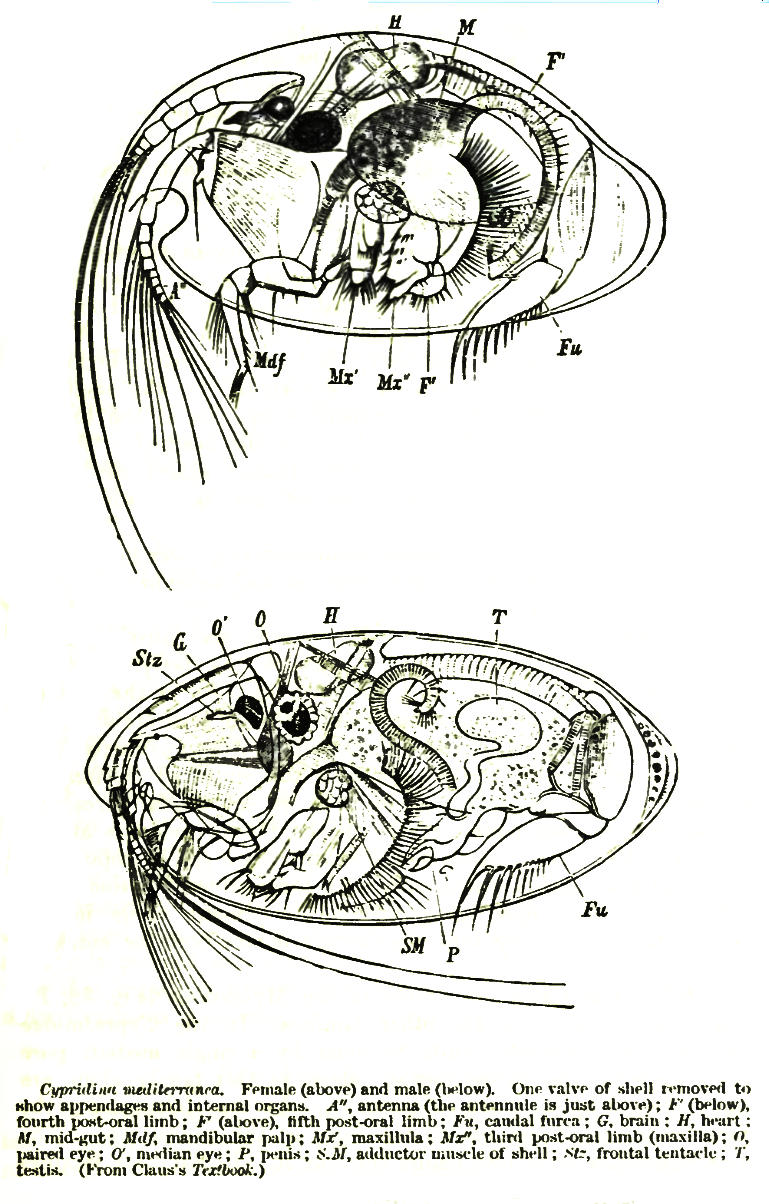
Anatomy of Cypridina mediterranea

The body of an ostracod is encased by a carapace originating from the head region, and consists of two valves superficially resembling the shell of a clam. A distinction is made between the valve (hard parts) and the body with its appendages (soft parts). Studies of the embryonic development in Myodocopida show that the bivalved carapace develops from two independent buds of the carapace valves. As the two halves grow, they meet in the middle. In Manawa, an ostracod in the order Palaeocopida, the carapace originates as a single element and during growth folds at the midline.

=== Body parts ===
Ostracod swimming motions (in real time)

The body consists of a head and thorax, separated by a slight constriction. Unlike many other crustaceans, the body is not clearly divided into segments. Most species have completely or partly lost their trunk segmentation, and there are no boundaries between the thorax and abdomen, and it has therefore been impossible to tell if the first pair of limbs after the maxillae belongs to the head or the thorax. With a few exceptions, like platycopids which have an 11-segmented trunk, the abdomen in ostracods has no visible segments.

The head is the largest part of the body, and bears four pairs of appendages. Two pairs of well-developed antennae are used to swim through the water. In addition, there are a pair of mandibles and a pair of maxillae. The thorax has three primary pairs of appendages. The first of these has different functions in different groups. It can be used for feeding (Cypridoidea) or for walking (Cytheroidea), and in some species it has evolved into a male clasping organ. The second pair is mainly used for locomotion, and the third is used for walking or cleaning, but can also be reduced or absent. Both the second and third pair are absent in suborder Cladocopina. In the Myodocopina the third pair is a multisegmented cleaning organ that resembles a worm. Their external genitals seem to originate from the fusion of three to five appendages. The two "rami", or projections, from the tip of the tail point downward and slightly forward from the rear of the shell.

All ostracods have a pair of "ventilatory appendages" that beat rhythmically, which create a water current between the body and the inner surface of the carapace. Podocopa, the largest subclass, have no gills, heart or circulatory system, so the gas exchange take place all over the surface. The other subclass of ostracods, the Myodocopa, do have a heart, and the family Cylindroleberididae also have 6–8 lamellar gills. Certain other larger members of Myodocopa, even if they don't have gills, have a circulatory system where hemolymph sinuses absorbs oxygen through special areas on the inner wall of the carapace. In addition, the respiratory protein hemocyanin has been found in the two orders Myodocopida and Platycopida. Nitrogenous waste is excreted through glands on the maxillae, antennae, or both.

The primary sense of ostracods is likely touch, as they have several sensitive hairs on their bodies and appendages. Compound eyes are only found in Myodocopina within the Myodocopa. The order Halocyprida in the same subclass is eyeless. Podocopid ostracods have just a naupliar eye consisting of two lateral ocelli and a single ventral ocellus, but the ventral one is absent in some species. Platycopida was assumed to be completely eyeless, but two species, Keijcyoidea infralittoralis and Cytherella sordida, have been found to both possess a nauplius eye too.

== Palaeoclimatic reconstruction ==
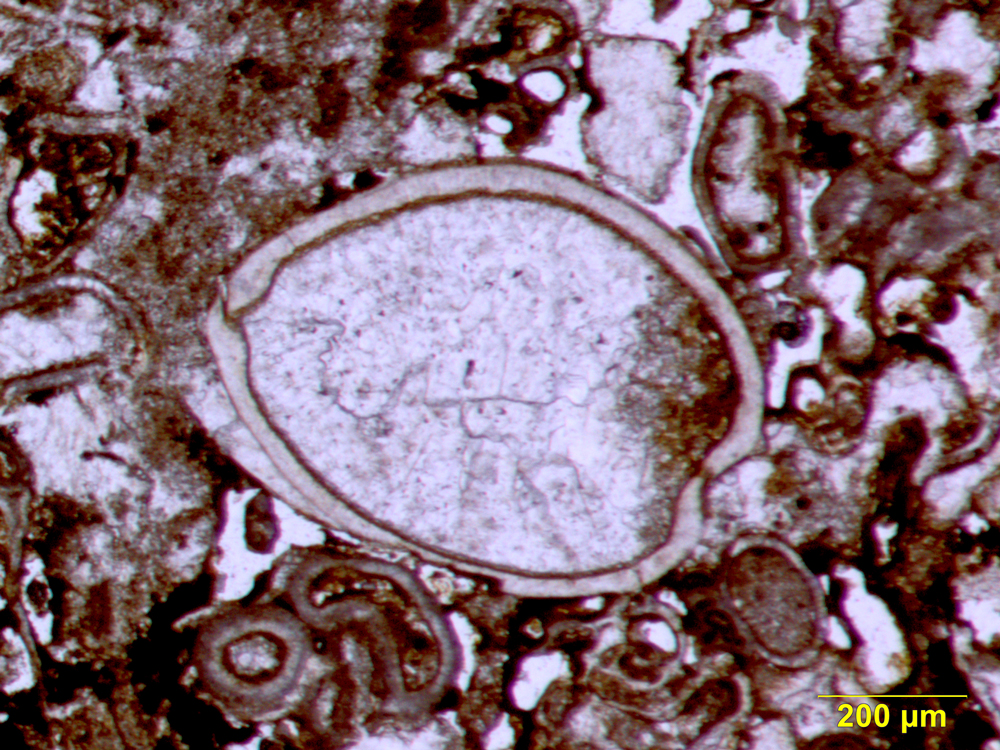
Articulated ostracod valves in cross-section from the Permian of central Texas; typical thin section view of an ostracod fossil

A new method is in development called mutual ostracod temperature range (MOTR), similar to the mutual climatic range (MCR) used for beetles, which can be used to infer palaeotemperatures. The ratio of oxygen-18 to oxygen-16 (δ18O) and the ratio of magnesium to calcium (Mg/Ca) in the calcite of ostracod valves can be used to infer information about past hydrological regimes, global ice volume and water temperatures.

== Distribution ==
Ecologically, marine ostracods can be part of the zooplankton or (most commonly) are part of the benthos, living on or inside the upper layer of the sea floor. Ostracods has been found as deep as 9,307 m (genus Krithe in family Krithidae). Subclass Myodocopa and the two podocop orders Palaeocopida and Platycopida are restricted to marine environments (except for Platycopida which have a few brackish species), but we find non-marine forms in the four superfamilies Terrestricytheroidea, Cypridoidea, Darwinuloidea, and Cytheroidea in the order Podocopida. Terrestricytheroidea is semi-terrestrial and usually found in brackish and marine-influenced environments such as salt marshes, but not in freshwater. The other three superfamilies also live in freshwater (Darwinuloidea is exclusively non-marine). Of these three, only Cypridoidea have freshwater species able to swim. Representatives living in terrestrial habitats are also found in all three freshwater groups, such as genus Mesocypris which is known from humid forest soils of South Africa, Australia and New Zealand.

As of 2008, around 2000 species and 200 genera of non-marine ostracods are found. However, a large portion of diversity is still undescribed, indicated by undocumented diversity hotspots of temporary habitats in Africa and Australia. Non-marine species have been found to live in sulfidic cave ecosystems such as the Movile Cave, deep groundwaters, hypersaline waters, acidic waters with pH as low as 3.4, phytotelmata in plants like bromeliads, and in temperatures varying from almost freezing to more than 50 °C in hot springs. Of the known specific and generic diversity of non-marine ostracods, half (1000 species, 100 genera) belongs to one family (of 13 families), Cyprididae. Many Cyprididae occur in temporary water bodies and have drought-resistant eggs, mixed/parthenogenetic reproduction, and the ability to swim. These biological attributes preadapt them to form successful radiations in these habitats.

== Ecology ==
=== Lifecycle ===
Male ostracods have two penises, corresponding to two genital openings (gonopores) on the female. The individual sperm are often large, and are coiled up within the testis prior to mating; in some cases, the uncoiled sperm can be up to six times the length of the male ostracod itself. Mating typically occurs during swarming, with large numbers of females swimming to join the males. Some species are partially or wholly parthenogenetic. Superfamily Darwinuloidea was assumed to have reproduced asexually for the last 200 million years, but rare males have since been discovered in one of the species.

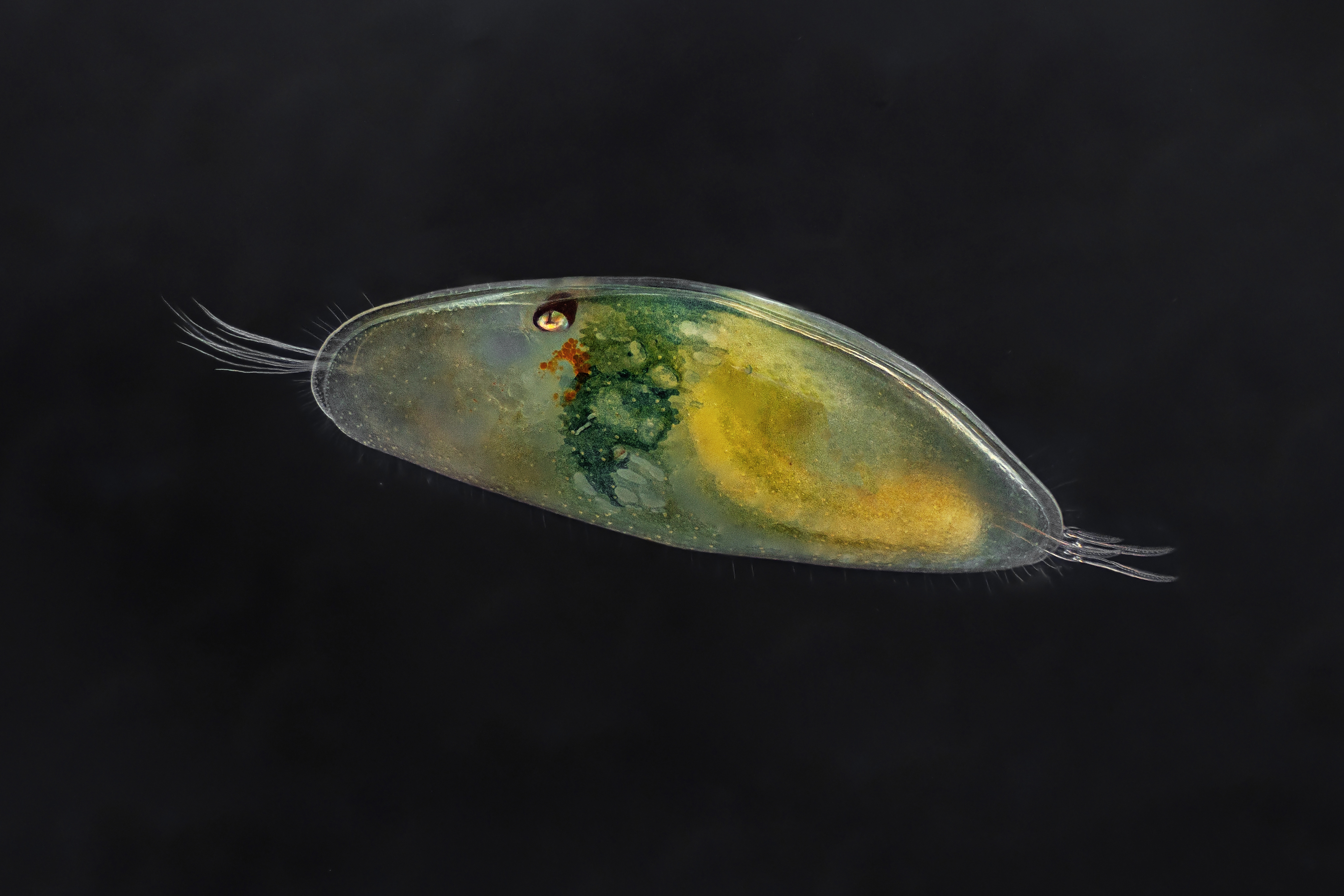
Ostracod

In the subclass Myodocopa, all members of the order Myodocopida have brood care, releasing their offspring as first instars, allowing a pelagic lifestyle. In the order Halocyprida the eggs are released directly into the sea, except for a single genus with brood care. In the subclass Podocopa, brood care is only found in Darwinulocopina and some Cytherocopina in the order Podocopida. In the remaining Podocopa it is common to glue the eggs to a firm surface, like vegetation or the substratum. These eggs are often resting eggs, and remain dormant during desiccation and extreme temperatures, only hatching when exposed to more favorable conditions. Species adapted to vernal pools can reach sexual maturity in just 30 days after hatching. There is no larval stage or metamorphosis (direct development). Instead they hatch from the egg as juveniles with the bivalved carapace and at least three functional limbs. As the juvenile grows through a series of molts they acquire more limbs and develop further the already existing ones. They reach sexual maturity in the final instar and then never molts again. The number of instars they go through before adulthood varies. In Podocopa it is eight or nine (but family Entocytheridae and suborder Bairdiocopina has only seven), the Halocyprida goes through six or seven, and Myodocopida only four to six. They are able to produce several offspring many times as adults (iteroparity).

=== Predators ===
A variety of fauna prey upon ostracods in both aquatic and terrestrial environments. An example of predation in the marine environment is the action of certain Cytherocopina in the cuspidariid clams in detecting ostracods with cilia protruding from inhalant structures, thence drawing the ostracod prey in by a violent suction action. Predation from higher animals also occurs; for example, amphibians such as the rough-skinned newt prey upon certain ostracods. Whale sharks also seem to eat them as part of their filter feeding process.

=== Bioluminescence ===
Some ostracods, such as Vargula hilgendorfii, have a light organ in which they produce luminescent chemicals. These ostracods are called "blue sand" or "blue tears" and glow blue in the dark. Their bioluminescent properties made them valuable to the Japanese during World War II, when the Japanese army collected large amounts from the ocean to use as a convenient light for reading maps and other papers at night. The light from these ostracods, called umihotaru in Japanese, was sufficient to read by but not bright enough to give away troops' position to enemies. Bioluminescence has evolved twice in ostracods; once in Cypridinidae, and once in Halocyprididae. In bioluminescent Halocyprididae a green light is produced within carapace glands, and in Cypridinidae a blue light is produced and extruded from the upper lip. Most species use the light as predation defense, but the male of at least 75 known species of the Cypridinidae, restricted to the Caribbean, use pulses of light to attract females. This bioluminescent courtship display has only evolved once in ostracods, in a cypridinid group named Luxorina that originated at least 151 million years ago. Ostracods with bioluminescent courtship show higher rates of speciation than those who simply use light as protection against predators. The glowing courtship lasts for about an hour and begins shortly after sunset on moonless nights, when the ostracods, normally found on seagrass and coral reefs, sense that the water is dark enough. By releasing small bioluminescent mucus pellets while swimming, males produce a display that females use not only to identify potential mates but also to pinpoint the male's exact position in the flash sequence. Some males do not produce flashes and attempt to intercept females that approach the glowing males. By moving vertically and diagonally, and producing flashes that vary in duration—from milliseconds to several seconds—as well as in brightness and sometimes tints, males produce distinct patterns in time and space. These patterns form strings of flashes ranging from less than 1 meter to 30 meters in length. In one species hundreds of thousands of males synchronize their light display, and when one male creates a pattern of light, the new pattern will spread out as the neighboring males repeat it.

== Classification ==
Early work indicated that Ostracoda may not be monophyletic, and early molecular phylogeny was ambiguous on this front. Recent combined analyses of molecular and morphological data suggested monophyly in analyses with broadest taxon sampling, but with no or very little support. The molecular analysis of Bernot et al. found Ostracoda to be nonmonophyletic, with Podocopa being Mystacocarida's sister group while Myodocopa is more closely related to Branchiura.

Class Ostracoda is divided into following living clades:

- Subclass Myodocopa
  - Order Myodocopida
    - Suborder Myodocopina
      - Superfamily Cypridinoidea (1 family)
      - Superfamily Cylindroleberidoidea (1 family)
      - Superfamily Sarsielloidea (3 families)
  - Order Halocyprida
    - Suborder Halocypridina
      - Superfamily Thaumatocypridoidea (1 family)
      - Superfamily Halocypridoidea (1 family)
    - Suborder Cladocopina
      - Superfamily Cladocopoidea (1 family)
- Subclass Podocopa
  - Order Palaeocopida
    - Suborder Kirkbyocopina
      - Superfamily Puncioidea (1 family)
  - Order Platycopida
    - Suborder Platycopina
      - Superfamily Cytherelloidea (1 family)
  - Order Podocopida
    - Suborder Cytherocopina
      - Superfamily Cytheroidea (27 families)
      - Superfamily Terrestricytheroidea (1 family)
    - Suborder Cypridocopina
      - Superfamily Macrocypridoidea (1 family)
      - Superfamily Pontocypridoidea (1 family)
      - Superfamily Cypridoidea (4 families)
    - Suborder Darwinulocopina
      - Superfamily Darwinuloidea (1 family)
    - Suborder Bairdiocopina
      - Superfamily Bairdioidea (3 families)
    - Suborder Sigilliocopina
      - Superfamily Sigillioidea (1 family)

== See also ==
- Mari Mari Group, fossil formation in the state of Amazonas of northwestern Brazil
