= 2022 in arthropod paleontology =

2022 in arthropod paleontology is a list of new arthropod fossil taxa, including arachnids, crustaceans, insects, trilobites, and other arthropods that were announced or described, as well as other significant arthropod paleontological discoveries and events which occurred in 2022.

== Arachnids ==
=== New taxa ===
Name	Novelty	Status	Authors	Age	Type locality	Country	Notes	Images
Acrometa gibbosa	Sp. nov	Valid	Wunderlich	Eocene	Baltic amber	Europe (Baltic Sea region)	A spider belonging to the family Synotaxidae.	
Acrometa glomus	Sp. nov	Valid	Wunderlich	Eocene	Baltic amber	Europe (Baltic Sea region)	A spider belonging to the family Synotaxidae.	
Acrometa longisetae	Sp. nov	Valid	Wunderlich	Eocene	Baltic amber	Europe (Baltic Sea region)	A spider belonging to the family Synotaxidae.	
Annazomus	Gen. et sp. nov	Valid	De Francesco Magnussen & Müller in De Francesco Magnussen et al.	Cretaceous	Burmese amber	Myanmar	A member of Schizomida belonging to the family Hubbardiidae. The type species is A. parvulus De Francesco Magnussen.	
Araneometa procera	Sp. nov	Valid	Wunderlich in Wunderlich & Müller	Miocene	Mexican amber	Mexico	A long-jawed orb weaver.	
Archaeocroton kaufmani	Sp. nov	Valid	Chitimia-Dobler, Mans & Dunlop in Chitimia-Dobler et al.	Cretaceous	Burmese amber	Myanmar	A hard tick. Announced in 2022; the final article version was published in 2023.	
Archaeofeaella	Gen. et sp. nov		Kolesnikov et al.	Late Triassic		Ukraine	A pseudoscorpion belonging to the family Feaellidae. Genus includes new species A. henderickxi.	
Balticodromus	Gen. et sp. nov	Valid	Wunderlich	Eocene	Baltic amber	Europe (Baltic Sea region)	A spider belonging to the family Philodromidae. The type species is B. porrectus.	
Balticosynotaxus	Gen. et sp. nov	Valid	Wunderlich	Eocene	Baltic amber	Europe (Baltic Sea region)	A spider belonging to the family Synotaxidae. The type species is B. angulatus.	
Baltonychia	Gen. et sp. nov	Valid	Bartel, Derkarabetian & Dunlop	Eocene	Baltic amber	Europe (Baltic Sea region)	A member of Opiliones belonging to the superfamily Travunioidea. The type species is B. obscura.	
Betaburmesebuthus spinipedis	Sp. nov	In press	Xuan, Cai & Huang	Cretaceous	Burmese amber	Myanmar	A scorpion belonging to the family Palaeoburmesebuthidae.	
Bicornoculus aungi	Sp. nov	Valid	Jiang & Li in Xin et al.	Late Cretaceous	Burmese amber	Myanmar	A spider belonging to the family Tetrablemmidae.	
Bicornoculus wunnai	Sp. nov	Valid	Jiang & Li in Xin et al.	Late Cretaceous	Burmese amber	Myanmar	A spider belonging to the family Tetrablemmidae.	
Bicornoculus yarzari	Sp. nov	Valid	Jiang & Li in Xin et al.	Late Cretaceous	Burmese amber	Myanmar	A spider belonging to the family Tetrablemmidae.	
Bothriocroton muelleri	Sp. nov	Valid	Chitimia-Dobler, Mans & Dunlop in Chitimia-Dobler et al.	Cretaceous	Burmese amber	Myanmar	A hard tick. Announced in 2022; the final article version was published in 2023.	
Burmalomanius	Gen. et sp. nov	In press	Bartel et al.	Cretaceous (Albian–Cenomanian)	Burmese amber	Myanmar	A member of Opiliones belonging to the family Podoctidae. Genus includes new species B. circularis.	
Burmatheridion cetani	Sp. nov	Valid	Jiang & Li in Xin et al.	Late Cretaceous	Burmese amber	Myanmar	A spider belonging to the family Theridiidae.	
Burmeochthonius	Gen. et 2 sp. nov		Johnson et al.	Late Cretaceous (Cenomanian)	Burmese amber	Myanmar	A pseudoscorpion belonging to the family Chthoniidae, subfamily Chthoniinae and the tribe Tyrannochthoniini. Genus includes new species B. kachinae and B. muelleri.	
Caeculus fedrae	Sp. nov	Valid	Porta, Michalik & Ramírez	Eocene	Baltic amber	Russia (Kaliningrad Oblast)	A mite belonging to the family Caeculidae.	
Chaerilobuthus brandti	Sp. nov	Valid	Lourenço in Lourenço & Velten	Cretaceous	Burmese amber	Myanmar	A scorpion belonging to family Chaerilobuthidae.	
Chrosiothes chiapas	Sp. nov	Valid	Wunderlich in Wunderlich & Müller	Miocene	Mexican amber	Mexico	A species of Chrosiothes.	
Claspingblemma	Gen. et sp. nov	Valid	Wunderlich in Wunderlich & Müller	Cretaceous	Burmese amber	Myanmar	A spider belonging to the family Tetrablemmidae. The type species is C. duospinae.	
Cretaceousbuthus	Gen. et sp. nov	Valid	Lourenço in Lourenço & Velten	Cretaceous	Burmese amber	Myanmar	A scorpion belonging to family Buthidae. The type species is C. fraaijeorum.	
Cretaceoushormiops staxi	Sp. nov	Valid	Lourenço in Lourenço & Velten	Cretaceous	Burmese amber	Myanmar	A scorpion belonging to family Protoischnuridae.	
Cretaceozomus	Gen. et 2 sp. nov	Valid	De Francesco Magnussen & Müller in De Francesco Magnussen et al.	Cretaceous	Burmese amber	Myanmar	A member of Schizomida. The type species is C. robustus De Francesco Magnussen; genus also includes C. angustocaudatus De Francesco Magnussen.	
Cretotheridion champoi	Sp. nov	Valid	Jiang & Li in Xin et al.	Late Cretaceous	Burmese amber	Myanmar	A spider belonging to the family Theridiidae.	
Cymbioblemma ohnmari	Sp. nov	Valid	Jiang & Li in Xin et al.	Late Cretaceous	Burmese amber	Myanmar	A spider belonging to the family Tetrablemmidae.	
Deinocroton copia	Sp. nov	Valid	Chitimia-Dobler, Mans & Dunlop in Chitimia-Dobler et al.	Cretaceous	Burmese amber	Myanmar	A tick.	
Doubravatarbus	Gen. et sp. nov	Valid	Hradská et al.	Carboniferous (Moscovian)	Kladno Formation	Czech Republic	A member of Trigonotarbida belonging to the family Aphantomartidae. The type species is D. krafti.	
Electroblemma acuminataformis	Sp. nov	Valid	Wunderlich in Wunderlich & Müller	Cretaceous	Burmese amber	Myanmar	A spider belonging to the family Tetrablemmidae.	
Eocryphoeca duplex	Sp. nov	Valid	Wunderlich	Eocene	Baltic amber	Europe (Baltic Sea region)	A spider related to Cryphoecina.	
Eocryphoecara longtegap	Sp. nov	Valid	Wunderlich	Eocene	Baltic amber	Europe (Baltic Sea region)	A spider related to Cryphoecina.	
Eogamasomorpha magnaseta	Sp. nov	Valid	Wunderlich in Wunderlich & Müller	Cretaceous	Burmese amber	Myanmar	A spider belonging to the family Tetrablemmidae.	
Eotrechalea darrellubick	Sp. nov	Valid	Wunderlich	Eocene	Baltic amber	Europe (Baltic Sea region)	A spider, possibly a member or a relative of the family Zoropsidae.	
Furcembolus inzaliae	Sp. nov	Valid	Jiang & Li in Xin et al.	Late Cretaceous	Burmese amber	Myanmar	A spider belonging to the family Pacullidae.	
Groehnizomus	Gen. et 2 sp. nov	Valid	De Francesco Magnussen & Müller in De Francesco Magnussen et al.	Cretaceous	Burmese amber	Myanmar	A member of Schizomida. The type species is G. oculiferans De Francesco Magnussen & Müller; genus also includes G. rodrigoi Müller.	
Hirsutisoma grimaldii	Sp. nov	Valid	Botero-Trujillo et al.	Cretaceous	Burmese amber	Myanmar	A member of Ricinulei belonging to the family Hirsutisomidae.	
Ixodes antiquorum	Sp. nov	Valid	Chitimia-Dobler, Mans & Dunlop in Chitimia-Dobler et al.	Cretaceous	Burmese amber	Myanmar	A tick, a species of Ixodes.	
Kachintelema	Gen. et sp. nov	Valid	Wunderlich in Wunderlich & Müller	Cretaceous	Burmese amber	Myanmar	A spider belonging to the family Telemidae. The type species is K. calcarfemur.	
Khimaira	Gen. et sp. nov	Valid	Chitimia-Dobler, Mans & Dunlop in Chitimia-Dobler et al.	Cretaceous	Burmese amber	Myanmar	A tick combining a body resembling that of a soft tick with a basis capitulum more like that of a hard tick, assigned to a new family Khimairidae as a possible transitional form between soft and hard ticks. Genus includes new species K. fossus.	
Laccolithus petrunkevitchi	Sp. nov	Valid	Wunderlich	Eocene	Baltic amber	Europe (Baltic Sea region)	A spider belonging to the family Phrurolithidae.	
Longissipalpus aliter	Nom. nov	Valid	Wunderlich in Wunderlich & Müller	Cretaceous	Burmese amber	Myanmar	A spider belonging to the group Araneomorphae and the family Pholcochyroceridae; a replacement name for Longissipalpus cochlea Wunderlich (2021).	
Mesodibunus	Gen. et sp. nov	In press	Bartel et al.	Cretaceous (Albian–Cenomanian)	Burmese amber	Myanmar	A member of Opiliones belonging to the family Epedanidae. Genus includes new species M. tourinhoae.	
Microuloborus ater	Sp. nov	Valid	Wunderlich in Wunderlich & Müller	Cretaceous	Burmese amber	Myanmar	A spider belonging to the family Uloboridae.	
Muellerizomus	Gen. et 2 sp. nov	Valid	De Francesco Magnussen & Müller in De Francesco Magnussen et al.	Cretaceous	Burmese amber	Myanmar	A member of Schizomida. The type species is M. palicaudatus De Francesco Magnussen; genus also includes M. amandae De Francesco Magnussen & Müller.	
Palaeoburmesebuthus andrewrossi	Sp. nov	Valid	Santiago-Blay et al.	Cretaceous	Burmese amber	Myanmar	A scorpion belonging to the family Palaeoburmesebuthidae.	
Palaeoburmesebuthus smithi	Sp. nov	Valid	Santiago-Blay, Soleglad, Craig & Fet in Santiago-Blay et al.	Cretaceous	Burmese amber	Myanmar	A scorpion belonging to the family Palaeoburmesebuthidae.	
Palaeoleptoneta acus	Sp. nov	Valid	Wunderlich in Wunderlich & Müller	Cretaceous	Burmese amber	Myanmar	A spider belonging to the family Leptonetidae.	
Palaeoleptoneta baculum	Sp. nov	Valid	Wunderlich in Wunderlich & Müller	Cretaceous	Burmese amber	Myanmar	A spider belonging to the family Leptonetidae.	
Palaeoleptoneta laticymbium	Sp. nov	Valid	Wunderlich in Wunderlich & Müller	Cretaceous	Burmese amber	Myanmar	A spider belonging to the family Leptonetidae.	
Palpalpaculla phyui	Sp. nov	Valid	Jiang & Li in Xin et al.	Late Cretaceous	Burmese amber	Myanmar	A spider belonging to the family Tetrablemmidae.	
Palptibiaap	Gen. et sp. nov	Valid	Wunderlich in Wunderlich & Müller	Cretaceous	Burmese amber	Myanmar	A spider belonging to the group Araneoidea and the family Zarqaraneidae. The type species is P. cochlear.	
Parachimerarachne	Gen. et sp. nov	Valid	Wunderlich in Wunderlich & Müller	Cretaceous	Burmese amber	Myanmar	An arachnid related to Chimerarachne. The type species is P. longiflagellum. Later study synonymized this genus to Chimerarachne.	
Petroburma	Gen. et sp. nov	In press	Bartel et al.	Cretaceous (Albian–Cenomanian)	Burmese amber	Myanmar	A member of Opiliones belonging to the family Petrobunidae. Genus includes new species P. tarsomeria.	
Phycosoma icti	Sp. nov	Valid	García-Villafuerte et al.	Miocene	Mexican amber	Mexico	A species of Phycosoma.	
Praeteraraneoides multidentatum	Sp. nov	Valid	Wunderlich in Wunderlich & Müller	Cretaceous	Burmese amber	Myanmar	A spider belonging to the group Leptonetoidea and the family Protoaraneoididae.	
Praetervetiator parvicirculus	Sp. nov	Valid	Wunderlich in Wunderlich & Müller	Cretaceous	Burmese amber	Myanmar	A spider belonging to the group Araneomorphae and the family Vetiatoridae.	
Priscaleclercera chimei	Sp. nov	Valid	Jiang & Li in Xin et al.	Late Cretaceous	Burmese amber	Myanmar	A spider belonging to the family Psilodercidae, a species of Priscaleclercera.	
Priscaleclercera foshou	Sp. nov	Valid	Jiang & Li in Xin et al.	Late Cretaceous	Burmese amber	Myanmar	A spider belonging to the family Psilodercidae, a species of Priscaleclercera.	
Priscaleclercera hlaingi	Sp. nov	Valid	Jiang & Li in Xin et al.	Late Cretaceous	Burmese amber	Myanmar	A spider belonging to the family Psilodercidae, a species of Priscaleclercera.	
Priscaleclercera kani	Sp. nov	Valid	Jiang & Li in Xin et al.	Late Cretaceous	Burmese amber	Myanmar	A spider belonging to the family Psilodercidae, a species of Priscaleclercera.	
Priscaleclercera kyawae	Sp. nov	Valid	Jiang & Li in Xin et al.	Late Cretaceous	Burmese amber	Myanmar	A spider belonging to the family Psilodercidae, a species of Priscaleclercera.	
Priscaleclercera thanae	Sp. nov	Valid	Jiang & Li in Xin et al.	Late Cretaceous	Burmese amber	Myanmar	A spider belonging to the family Psilodercidae, a species of Priscaleclercera.	
Priscaleclercera thaungi	Sp. nov	Valid	Jiang & Li in Xin et al.	Late Cretaceous	Burmese amber	Myanmar	A spider belonging to the family Psilodercidae, a species of Priscaleclercera.	
Procerclypeus corniculatus	Sp. nov	Valid	Wunderlich in Wunderlich & Müller	Cretaceous	Burmese amber	Myanmar	A spider belonging to the family Tetrablemmidae.	
Propterkachin pygmaeus	Sp. nov	Valid	Wunderlich in Wunderlich & Müller	Cretaceous	Burmese amber	Myanmar	A spider belonging to the family Uloboridae.	
Propterkachin unispinatus	Sp. nov	Valid	Wunderlich in Wunderlich & Müller	Cretaceous	Burmese amber	Myanmar	A spider belonging to the family Uloboridae.	
Protochactas	Gen. et sp. nov	Valid	Fabio Magnani	Middle Triassic	Meride limestone	Switzerland	A basal scorpion.	
Retrooecobius lwini	Sp. nov	Valid	Jiang & Li in Xin et al.	Late Cretaceous	Burmese amber	Myanmar	A spider belonging to the family Oecobiidae.	
Sigillaricinuleus	Gen. et sp. nov	Valid	Wunderlich	Cretaceous	Burmese amber	Myanmar	A member of Ricinulei. The type species is S. tripares.	
Spinicymbium curviparacymbium	Sp. nov	Valid	Wunderlich in Wunderlich & Müller	Cretaceous	Burmese amber	Myanmar	A spider belonging to the group Araneoidea and the family Zarqaraneidae.	
?Sulcosynotaxus matrimonium	Sp. nov	Valid	Wunderlich	Eocene	Baltic amber	Europe (Baltic Sea region)	A spider belonging to the family Synotaxidae.	
Taubaracna	Gen. et sp. nov		Martine et al.	Oligocene	Tremembé Formation	Brazil	A spider belonging to the group Araneomorphae. The type species is T. maculosa.	
Thymoites carboti	Sp. nov		García-Villafuerte	Miocene	Mexican amber	Mexico	A species of Thymoites.	
Triangulum	Gen. et sp. nov	Valid	Jiang & Li in Xin et al.	Late Cretaceous	Burmese amber	Myanmar	A spider belonging to the family Theridiidae. The type species is T. thutai.	
Trichoribates roynortoni	Sp. nov		Ojeda & Rivas in Ojeda, Vega & Rivas	Miocene	La Quinta Formation (Mexican amber)	Mexico	A mite belonging to the family Ceratozetidae.	
Zamilia arkari	Sp. nov	Valid	Jiang & Li in Xin et al.	Late Cretaceous	Burmese amber	Myanmar	A spider belonging to the family Oecobiidae.	
Zamilia sheini	Sp. nov	Valid	Jiang & Li in Xin et al.	Late Cretaceous	Burmese amber	Myanmar	A spider belonging to the family Oecobiidae.	
Zamilia shwayi	Sp. nov	Valid	Jiang & Li in Xin et al.	Late Cretaceous	Burmese amber	Myanmar	A spider belonging to the family Oecobiidae.	

=== Arachnid research ===
- Shanks & Selden (2022) describe the first trigonotarbid specimens from the Carboniferous Shelburn Formation of Indiana and Senora Formation of Oklahoma.
- A study on the anatomy of Protoischnurus axelrodorum is published by Carvalho et al. (2022), who interpret this scorpion as a probable early member of the crown group of Iurida, possibly a stem hormurid.
- Xuan, Cai & Huang (2022) describe two immature scorpions from the Cretaceous amber from Myanmar, assigned to the genus Chaerilus.
- Revision of recluse spiders from the Dominican amber is published by Magalhaes et al. (2022), who transfer the species "Loxosceles" aculicaput to the family Drymusidae and to the genus Drymusa.

== Crustaceans ==
=== Malacostracans ===
Name	Novelty	Status	Authors	Age	Type locality	Country	Notes	Images
Afroapseudes	Gen. et sp. nov		Pasini, Vega & Garassino	Late Cretaceous (Cenomanian-Turonian)		Morocco	A member of Tanaidacea belonging to the group Apseudomorpha. The type species is A. cretacicus.	
Agnocarina	Gen. et sp. nov	Valid	Beschin, Busulini & Tessier	Eocene		Italy	A crab belonging to the family Litocheiridae. The type species is A. quadriangula.	
Agnonectes	Gen. et sp. nov	Valid	Beschin, Busulini & Tessier	Eocene		Italy	A crab belonging to the family Portunidae. The type species is A. curvus.	
Anisaeger longirostrus	Sp. nov	Valid	Smith et al.	Early Triassic		United States	A member of the family Aegeridae.	
Anisopagurus primigenius	Sp. nov	Valid	Ferratges et al.	Early Eocene	Serraduy Formation	Spain	A hermit crab.	
Aquitainotlos	Gen. et sp. nov	Valid	Ossó & Cluzaud in Cluzaud & Ossó, 2022	Oligocene (Rupelian)		France	A crab belonging to the family Leucosiidae. The type species is A. gaasensis.	
Archaeotetra angulosa	Sp. nov	Valid	Beschin, Busulini & Tessier	Eocene		Italy	A crab belonging to the family Trapeziidae.	
Asthenognathus fernandezi	Sp. nov		Ferratges, Zamora & Aurell	Eocene (Ypresian)	Roda Formation	Spain	A crab belonging to the family Varunidae.	
Basidromilites	Gen. et sp. nov	Valid	Artal et al.	Early Eocene	Serraduy Formation	Spain	A dromioid crab. Genus includes new species B. glaessneri.	
Bechleja brevirostris	Sp. nov	Valid	De Mazancourt, Wappler & Wedmann	Eocene	Messel pit	Germany	Possibly a member of the family Palaemonidae. Announced in 2022; the correction including evidence of registration in ZooBank was published in 2023.	
Brunnaega labuttensis	Sp. nov	Valid	Wilson & Morel	Late Cretaceous (Cenomanian)		France	An isopod belonging to the family Cirolanidae.	
Chiapasphaera	Gen. et sp. nov	In press	Vega & Bruce in Vega et al.	Early Cretaceous (Aptian)	Sierra Madre Formation	Mexico	An isopod belonging to the family Sphaeromatidae. The type species is C. cretacea.	
Chronocancer	Gen. et sp. nov	Valid	Santana et al.	Early Cretaceous (Aptian-Albian)	Romualdo Formation	Brazil	A crab, probably a member of the family Orithopsidae. The type species is C. camilosantanai. Announced in 2022 in an online-only journal, and the publication did not include a ZooBank registration number; validated in 2023.	
Clibanarius isabenaensis	Sp. nov	Valid	Ferratges et al.	Early Eocene	Serraduy Formation	Spain	A species of Clibanarius.	
Cornedozius	Gen. et sp. nov	Valid	Beschin, Busulini & Tessier	Eocene		Italy	A crab belonging to the family Menippidae. The type species is C. laevis.	
Daciapagurus szklarkaensis	Sp. nov	Valid	Fraaije et al.	Late Jurassic (Oxfordian)		Poland	A hermit crab.	
Dardanus agnoensis	Sp. nov	Valid	Beschin, Busulini & Tessier	Eocene		Italy	A species of Dardanus.	
Dardanus balaitus	Sp. nov	Valid	Ferratges et al.	Early Eocene	Serraduy Formation	Spain	A species of Dardanus.	
Ebalia baldanzae	Sp. nov	Valid	Garassino, Pasini & Pizzolato	Early Pleistocene		Italy	A species of Ebalia.	
Ebalia parva	Sp. nov	Valid	Garassino, Pasini & Pizzolato	Early Pleistocene		Italy	A species of Ebalia.	
Eoacmaeopleura	Gen. et sp. nov	Valid	De Angeli & Bellin	Eocene		Italy	A crab belonging to the family Varunidae. Genus includes new species E. arzignanensis.	
Eocalcinus veteris	Sp. nov	Valid	Ferratges et al.	Early Eocene	Serraduy Formation	Spain	A hermit crab.	
Eolinurus	Gen. et comb. nov	Valid	Pasini et al.	Eocene (Ypresian)	Monte Bolca	Italy	A spiny lobster. The type species is "Palinurus" desmaresti Secrétan (1975).	
Eomunidopsis texcalaensis	Sp. nov	Valid	Klompmaker et al.	Early Cretaceous (Barremian)	Zapotitlán Formation	Mexico	A member of the family Galatheidae.	
Eostenetrium	Gen. et sp. nov	Valid	Wilson & Morel	Late Cretaceous (Cenomanian)		France	An isopod belonging to the family Stenetriidae. Genus includes new species E. guerangeri.	
Eureotropis	Gen. et sp. nov	In press	Mendes, Santana & Carvalho	Early Cretaceous (Barremian)	Sergipe-Alagoas Basin	Brazil	A crab belonging to the family Hymenosomatidae. The type species is E. elongata.	
Galatheites sforum	Sp. nov	Valid	Klompmaker et al.	Late Jurassic (Kimmeridgian)	Massenkalk Formation	Germany	A member of Galatheoidea belonging to the family Catillogalatheidae.	
Galene dashtbani	Sp. nov	Valid	Khosravi et al.	Miocene (Langhian)	Mishan Formation	Iran	A species of Galene.	
Goniocypoda manuelae	Sp. nov	Valid	De Angeli & Caporiondo	Eocene		Italy	A crab belonging to the family Hexapodidae.	
Huhatanka australis	Sp. nov	Valid	Schweitzer, Feldmann & Casadío	Early Cretaceous		Argentina	A member of Glypheoidea belonging to the family Mecochiridae.	
Justitia confusa	Sp. nov	Valid	Pasini et al.	Eocene (Ypresian)	Monte Bolca	Italy	A spiny lobster, a species of Justitia.	
Kromtitis isabenensis	Sp. nov	Valid	Artal et al.	Early Eocene	Serraduy Formation	Spain	A dromioid crab.	
Ladinicaris	Gen. et sp. nov	Valid	Pasini et al.	Middle Triassic	Upper Meride Limestone	Switzerland	A member of the family Penaeidae. The type species is L. sceltrichensis.	
Laevicarcinus grolensis	Sp. nov	Valid	Beschin, Busulini & Tessier	Eocene		Italy	A crab.	
Lantoceramia	Gen. et sp. nov	Valid	Wilson & Morel	Late Cretaceous (Cenomanian)		France	An isopod belonging to the group Cymothooidea and the new family Lantoceramiidae. Genus includes new species L. ooeida.	
Lathahypossia multispinosa	Sp. nov	Valid	Beschin, Busulini & Tessier	Eocene		Italy	A crab.	
Lessinoachela	Gen. et sp. nov	Valid	Pasini et al.	Eocene (Ypresian)	Monte Bolca	Italy	A member of Achelata of uncertain affinities. The type species is L. scaligera.	
Lucahexapus	Gen. et sp. nov	Valid	De Angeli & Caporiondo	Eocene		Italy	A crab belonging to the family Hexapodidae. The type species is L. mainensis.	
Mainyozius	Gen. et sp. nov	Valid	De Angeli & Bellin	Eocene		Italy	A crab belonging to the family Pseudoziidae. Genus includes new species M. bituberculatus.	
Mclaynotopus	Gen. et sp. nov	Valid	Artal et al.	Early Eocene	Serraduy Formation	Spain	A dromioid crab. Genus includes new species M. longispinosus.	
Mesozoidotea	Gen. et sp. nov	Valid	Wilson & Morel	Late Cretaceous (Cenomanian)		France	An isopod belonging to the family Idoteidae. Genus includes new species M. gazonfierensis.	
Montemagralia acuta	Sp. nov	Valid	Beschin, Busulini & Tessier	Eocene		Italy	A crab.	
Necrocarcinus christinae	Sp. nov	In press	Van Bakel, Ossó & Jackson	Late Cretaceous (Cenomanian)	Woodbine Formation	United States (Texas)	A crab belonging to the family Necrocarcinidae.	
Paguristes perlatus	Sp. nov	Valid	Ferratges et al.	Early Eocene	Serraduy Formation	Spain	A species of Paguristes.	
Paguristes priarensis	Sp. nov	Valid	Beschin, Busulini & Tessier	Eocene		Italy	A species of Paguristes.	
Palaeoplanes	Gen. et sp. nov	Valid	Beschin, Busulini & Tessier	Eocene		Italy	A crab of uncertain affinities. Genus includes new species P. veneticus.	
Palicus priscus	Sp. nov	Valid	Beschin, Busulini & Tessier	Eocene		Italy	A species of Palicus.	
Palicus saenaensis	Sp. nov	Valid	Pasini, Garassino & Pizzolato	Early Pleistocene		Italy	A species of Palicus.	
Paracorallicarcinus cornedensis	Sp. nov	Valid	Beschin, Busulini & Tessier	Eocene		Italy	A crab belonging to the family Litocheiridae.	
Paradistefania subdivisa	Sp. nov	Valid	Beschin, Busulini & Tessier	Eocene		Italy	A crab belonging to the superfamily Homolodromioidea and the family Goniodromitidae.	
Paraglyphea simpsoni	Sp. nov	Valid	Charbonnier & Garassino	Middle Jurassic (Callovian)		United Kingdom	A member of Glypheidea	
Parapetrochirus serratus	Sp. nov	Valid	Ferratges et al.	Early Eocene	Serraduy Formation	Spain	A hermit crab.	
Paredonius	Gen. et comb. nov	Valid	Vega & Garassino	Late Cretaceous (Maastrichtian)	Potrerillos Formation	Mexico	A crab of uncertain affinities. Genus includes "Sodakus" mexicanus Vega, Feldmann & Villobos-Hiriart (1995).	
Pemphix krumenackeri	Sp. nov	Valid	Smith et al.	Early Triassic		United States	A member of Glypheidea.	
Protochaetilia	Gen. et sp. nov	Valid	Wilson & Morel	Late Cretaceous (Cenomanian)		France	An isopod belonging to the family Chaetiliidae. Genus includes new species P. delaunayi.	
Protohymenosoma	Gen. et 2 sp. nov	In press	Mendes, Santana & Carvalho	Early Cretaceous (Barremian)	Sergipe-Alagoas Basin	Brazil	A crab belonging to the family Hymenosomatidae. Genus includes new species P. gondwanicum and P. hexagonale.	
Protomunida bennickei	Sp. nov	Valid	Klompmaker et al.	Paleocene (Danian)		Denmark	A member of the family Munididae.	
Protomunida eurekantha	Sp. nov	Valid	Klompmaker et al.	Paleocene (Danian)	Faxe Formation	Denmark	A member of the family Munididae.	
Pylochelitergites cicatrix	Sp. nov	Valid	Fraaije et al.	Late Jurassic (Oxfordian)		Poland	A hermit crab.	
Santeella blowi	Sp. nov	Valid	Beschin, Busulini & Tessier	Eocene		Italy	A crab.	
Sienalia	Gen. et 2 sp. nov	Valid	Garassino, Pasini & Pizzolato	Early Pleistocene		Italy	A crab belonging to the family Leucosiidae. The type species is S. fredianii; genus also includes S. ristorii.	
Sierradromia	Gen. et sp. nov	Valid	Artal et al.	Early Eocene	Serraduy Formation	Spain	A dromioid crab. Genus includes new species S. gladiator.	
Stimdromia conternoi	Sp. nov	Valid	Beschin & De Angeli	Eocene (Bartonian)		Italy	A crab belonging to the family Dromiidae.	
Teruzzicheles	Gen. et comb. nov	Valid	Audo & Charbonnier	Early Jurassic (Sinemurian)		Italy	A member of the family Polychelidae; a new genus for "Coleia" popeyei Teruzzi (1990).	
Tethysgalathea	Gen. et comb. nov	Valid	Klompmaker et al.	Eocene (Ypresian)		Italy	A member of the family Galatheidae. The type species is "Eomunidopsis" prealpina Beschin et al. (2016).	
Tomaricaris	Gen. et sp. nov	Valid	Garassino, Pasini & Nazarkin	Miocene (Serravallian-Tortonian)	Kurasi Formation	Russia (Sakhalin Oblast)	A caridean shrimp belonging to the family Barbouriidae. The type species is T. ainuensis.	
Torodromia	Gen. et sp. nov	Valid	Artal et al.	Early Eocene	Serraduy Formation	Spain	A dromioid crab. Genus includes new species T. elongata.	
Vasconilia zapotitlanensis	Sp. nov	Valid	Klompmaker et al.	Early Cretaceous (Barremian)	Zapotitlán Formation	Mexico	A member of Galatheoidea belonging to the family Catillogalatheidae.	
Viaia brinae	Sp. nov	In press	Gašparič et al.	Early Cretaceous (Aptian to Albian)		Slovenia	A crab belonging to the family Viaiidae.	
Viaia tisae	Sp. nov	In press	Gašparič et al.	Early Cretaceous (Aptian to Albian)		Slovenia	A crab belonging to the family Viaiidae.	
Zapalianassa	Gen. et comb. nov	Valid	Schweitzer, Feldmann & Casadío			Argentina	A new genus for "Pehuenchia" magna Rusconi (1948).	

==== Malacostracan research ====
- Description of the fossil material of members of Pygocephalomorpha from the Carboniferous Piesberg quarry (Lower Saxony, Germany), including a record of Anthracaris gracilis which was previously reported from the Mazon Creek fossil beds (Illinois, United States) and from Bickershaw (Lancashire, United Kingdom), and a study on the distribution of eumalacostracan crustaceans from Carboniferous deposits of North America and Europe is published by Pazinato et al. (2022).
- Redescription of Oncopareia bredai and a revision of other species previously referred to the genus Oncopareia is published by Tshudy et al. (2022).
- A study on the evolution of carapace morphology of hermit crabs and changes of composition of their assemblages through time is published by Fraaije et al. (2022), who reinstate Probeebeidae as a distinct family, and name a new family Paguropsidae.
- A study on sexual dimorphism and intersex specimens in the population of hundreds of specimens of the Cretaceous crab Dakoticancer overanus Jones, Schweitzer & Feldmann (2022).
- Ossó et al. (2022) report the first known fossil material of Pleolobites from the Paleocene (Thanetian) of Togo, and reevaluate the phylogenetic affinities of this and other fossil portunoid crabs.
- A concretion containing an adult and a juvenile individual of Trichopeltarion greggi, representing the first association of an adult female and a juvenile crab of the same species in the fossil record reported to date, is described from the Miocene Greta Siltstone (New Zealand) by Feldmann & Schweitzer (2022), who interpret this finding as possible evidence of maternal care of juveniles.

=== Ostracods ===
Name	Novelty	Status	Authors	Age	Type locality	Country	Notes	Images
Aaleniella franzi	Sp. nov	Valid	Tesakova	Middle Jurassic		Russia		
Aaleniella? ovoidea	Sp. nov	Valid	Tesakova	Middle Jurassic		Russia		
Aaleniella volganica	Sp. nov	Valid	Tesakova	Middle Jurassic		Russia		
Acrocythere sokurensis	Sp. nov	Valid	Tesakova	Middle Jurassic		Russia		
Alatobairdia? sohni	Sp. nov	Valid	Forel in Forel et al.	Late Triassic (Norian)	Aksala Formation	Canada (Yukon)	A member of the family Bairdiidae.	
Anticythereis dorsennus	Sp. nov	Valid	Puckett & Hunt	Late Cretaceous		United States		
Anticythereis slipperi	Sp. nov	Valid	Puckett & Hunt	Late Cretaceous		United States		
Asculdoracythereis	Gen. et 3 sp. nov	Valid	Puckett & Hunt	Late Cretaceous		United States	Genus includes new species A. asculdora, A. invicta and A. pseudoalabamensis.	
Aurila diodoroi	Sp. nov		Sciuto, Baldanza & Reitano	Early Pleistocene		Italy		
Aurila seguenzai	Sp. nov		Sciuto, Baldanza & Reitano	Early Pleistocene		Italy		
Bairdia aksala	Sp. nov	Valid	Forel in Forel et al.	Late Triassic (Norian)	Aksala Formation	Canada (Yukon)	A member of the family Bairdiidae.	
Bairdia taan	Sp. nov	Valid	Forel in Forel et al.	Late Triassic (Carnian and Norian)	Aksala Formation	Canada (Yukon); Italy	A member of the family Bairdiidae.	
Bairdia yukonensis	Sp. nov	Valid	Forel in Forel et al.	Late Triassic (Norian)	Aksala Formation	Canada (Yukon)	A member of the family Bairdiidae.	
Bairdiacypris xainzaensis	Sp. nov	In press	Song et al.	Late Devonian	Chaguoluoma Formation	China		
Bairdoppilata barremiana	Sp. nov		Mojon in Mojon & De Kaenel	Early Cretaceous (Barremian)		France; Switzerland		
Bradyleberis praecristatella	Sp. nov		McDonald & Warne	Miocene	Bookpurnong Formation	Australia		
Callistocythere bookpurnongensis	Sp. nov		McDonald & Warne	Miocene	Bookpurnong Formation	Australia	A species of Callistocythere.	
Callistocythere mchenryi	Sp. nov		McDonald & Warne	Miocene	Bookpurnong Formation	Australia	A species of Callistocythere.	
Callistocythere zigzaga	Sp. nov		McDonald & Warne	Miocene	Bookpurnong Formation	Australia	A species of Callistocythere.	
Camptocythere (Anabarocythere) muricata	Sp. nov	Valid	Gerke & Lev in Tesakova	Middle Jurassic (Bathonian–Callovian)		Russia		
Camptocythere (Anabarocythere) triangula	Sp. nov	Valid	Tesakova	Middle Jurassic (Bajocian and Bathonian)		Russia (Saratov Oblast)		
Camptocythere (Camptocythere) quinta	Sp. nov	Valid	Tesakova in Tesakova & Seltser	Jurassic		Russia		
Camptocythere (Palaeoloxoconcha) caudata	Sp. nov	Valid	Tesakova in Tesakova & Seltser	Jurassic		Russia		
Camptocythere (Palaeoloxoconcha) ryazanica	Sp. nov	Valid	Tesakova in Tesakova & Seltser	Jurassic		Russia		
Ceratopsis persicus	Sp. nov	Valid	Salas in Poursalehi et al.	Ordovician (Katian–Hirnantian)	Katkoyeh Formation	Iran	A member of Podocopa belonging to the order Beyrichiocopida and the family Tetradellidae.	
Cimbaurila ramdohri	Sp. nov		Sciuto, Baldanza & Reitano	Early Pleistocene		Italy		
Cistacythereis oertlii	Sp. nov		Sciuto, Baldanza & Reitano	Early Pleistocene		Italy		
Clavofabella? lanshella	Sp. nov	Valid	Guillam & Forel in Guillam et al.	Devonian (Famennian)	Gelaohe Formation	China	A member of Palaeocopida belonging to the family Primitiopsidae.	
Cornutobairdia yukonella	Sp. nov	Valid	Forel in Forel et al.	Late Triassic (Norian)	Aksala Formation	Canada (Yukon)	A member of the family Bairdiidae.	
Costa agyrina	Sp. nov		Sciuto, Baldanza & Reitano	Early Pleistocene		Italy		
Cyprideis atalaiensis	Sp. nov	Valid	Linhares & Ramos	Early Miocene	Solimões Formation	Brazil	A member of the family Cytherideidae.	
Cyprideis dictyon	Sp. nov	Valid	Linhares & Ramos	Middle to late Miocene	Solimões Formation	Brazil	A member of the family Cytherideidae.	
Cyprideis indianaensis	Sp. nov		Sousa & Ramos	Miocene	Pebas Formation	Peru		
Cyprideis santaelenae	Sp. nov		Sousa & Ramos	Miocene	Pebas Formation	Peru		
Cyprideis soledadensis	Sp. nov		Sousa & Ramos	Miocene	Pebas Formation	Peru		
Cytherellina caerulea	Sp. nov	Valid	Guillam & Forel in Guillam et al.	Devonian (Famennian)	Gelaohe Formation	China	A member of Podocopida belonging to the family Bairdiocyprididae.	
Damonella pumila	Sp. nov		Guzmán et al.	Early Cretaceous (Aptian)	Crato Formation	Brazil		
Deefgella? pulchra	Sp. nov	Valid	Melnikova et al.	Ordovician (Sandbian)	Gryazno Formation	Russia (Leningrad Oblast)		
Echinocythereis hartmannii	Sp. nov		Sciuto, Baldanza & Reitano	Early Pleistocene		Italy		
Electrocypria	Gen. et sp. nov	Valid	Wang, Matzke-Karasz & Horne	Cretaceous (Albian–Cenomanian)	Burmese amber	Myanmar	A member of the family Candonidae belonging to the subfamily Paracypridinae. The type species is E. burmitei.	
Eucytherura sanctavenerae	Sp. nov		Sciuto, Baldanza & Reitano	Early Pleistocene		Italy		
Fortistriginglymus	Gen. et comb. nov		McDonald & Warne	Miocene	Bookpurnong Formation	Australia	Genus includes "Cythere" postdeclivis Chapman (1914).	
Frodocythereis	Gen. et sp. nov	Valid	Puckett & Hunt	Late Cretaceous		United States	Genus includes new species F. frodoi.	
Glyptocythere bathonica	Sp. nov	Valid	Tesakova	Middle Jurassic (Bathonian)		Kazakhstan; Russia		
Hungarella limella	Sp. nov	Valid	Forel in Forel et al.	Late Triassic (Norian)	Aksala Formation	Canada (Yukon)	A member of Podocopa belonging to the family Healdiidae.	
Ilyocypris coimbrai	Sp. nov		Guzmán et al.	Early Cretaceous (Aptian)	Crato Formation	Brazil		
Karlingrella	Gen. et comb. nov	Valid	Groos-Uffenorde in Groos-Uffenorde et al.	Early Devonian		Germany; Morocco; Spain	A member of Podocopida, possibly a member of the family Ropolonellidae. The type species is "Euglyphella" granulosa Blumenstengel (1962).	
Kirkbya panamintensis	Sp. nov	Valid	McMenamin	Carboniferous (Mississippian)	Tin Mountain Limestone	United States (California)	A member of Palaeocopida belonging to the group Beyrichicopina and the family Kirkbyidae.	
Klyasinella	Gen. nov	Valid	Melnikova et al.	Ordovician (Sandbian)	Gryazno Formation	Russia (Leningrad Oblast)	The type species is K. bella.	
Kozuria	Gen. et comb. nov	Junior homonym	Forel	Middle and Late Triassic		Hungary; Romania; Turkey	A new genus erected for Triassic ostracods formerly assigned to the genus Acanthoscapha, such as "Acanthoscapha" veghae Kozur (1970), "Acanthoscapha" mersinella Forel in Forel et al. (2017) and "Acanthoscapha" amphialata Kristan-Tollmann (1973). The generic name is preoccupied by the radiolarian genus Kozuria Zhang (1990).	
Laevipellacythereis	Gen. et 2 sp. nov	Valid	Puckett & Hunt	Late Cretaceous		United States	Genus includes new species L. colossus and L. laevipellis.	
Leviella alexi	Sp. nov		Forel, Kolar-Jurkovšek & Jurkovšek	Middle Triassic (Ladinian)		Slovenia		
Leviella riedeli	Sp. nov	Valid	Forel in Forel et al.	Late Triassic (Norian)	Aksala Formation	Canada (Yukon)	A member of the family Cytherellidae.	
Lobobairdia whitella	Sp. nov	Valid	Forel in Forel et al.	Late Triassic (Norian)	Aksala Formation	Canada (Yukon)	A member of the family Bairdiidae.	
Longiscula? destorta	Sp. nov	Valid	Melnikova et al.	Ordovician (Sandbian)	Gryazno Formation	Russia (Leningrad Oblast)		
Loxoconcha pokornyi	Sp. nov		Sciuto, Baldanza & Reitano	Early Pleistocene		Italy		
Mantelliana speculum	Sp. nov	Valid	Tomé et al.	Early Cretaceous (Aptian)	Romualdo Formation	Brazil		
Microceratina retangularis	Sp. nov	Valid	Tomé et al.	Early Cretaceous (Aptian)	Romualdo Formation	Brazil		
Mirabairdia canadia	Sp. nov	Valid	Forel in Forel et al.	Late Triassic (Norian)	Aksala Formation	Canada (Yukon)	A member of the family Bairdiidae.	
Mirabairdia slovenica	Sp. nov		Forel, Kolar-Jurkovšek & Jurkovšek	Middle Triassic (Ladinian)		Slovenia		
Mongolianella aptianensis	Sp. nov	Valid	Tomé et al.	Early Cretaceous (Aptian)	Romualdo Formation	Brazil		
Nanacythere octum	Sp. nov	Valid	Tesakova	Middle Jurassic		Russia		
Nikitinella songliangensis	Sp. nov	In press	Zhang	Ordovician	Huadan Formation	China		
Paracandona rosaepraeceps	Sp. nov	Valid	Antonietto, Eaton & Park Boush	Paleogene	Claron Formation	United States (Utah)		
Paracypris undulareventralis	Sp. nov	Valid	Tomé et al.	Early Cretaceous (Aptian)	Romualdo Formation	Brazil		
Paracytheridea longicristata	Sp. nov		Sciuto, Baldanza & Reitano	Early Pleistocene		Italy		
Parakeijia notoreticularis	Sp. nov		McDonald & Warne	Miocene	Bookpurnong Formation	Australia		
Paranacythere	Gen. et sp. nov	Valid	Bergue et al.	Permian (Guadalupian)	Teresina Formation	Brazil	A possible member of the family Cytheruridae. The type species is P. nigripallus.	
Pattersoncypris cucurves	Sp. nov		Guzmán et al.	Early Cretaceous (Aptian)	Barbalha Formation	Brazil		
Pattersoncypris kroemmelbeini	Sp. nov		Guzmán et al.	Early Cretaceous (Aptian)		Brazil		
Perissocytheridea florisdorsalis	Sp. nov	Valid	Tomé et al.	Early Cretaceous (Aptian)	Romualdo Formation	Brazil		
Perissocytheridea oculusutilis	Sp. nov	Valid	Tomé et al.	Early Cretaceous (Aptian)	Romualdo Formation	Brazil		
Perissocytheridea poruslinearis	Sp. nov	Valid	Tomé et al.	Early Cretaceous (Aptian)	Romualdo Formation	Brazil		
Procytherura ippolitovi	Sp. nov	Valid	Tesakova in Tesakova & Seltser	Jurassic		Russia		
Procytherura iyae	Sp. nov	Valid	Tesakova	Middle Jurassic		Russia		
Quasillites (Beckjennites) gebeckeri	Sp. nov	Valid	Groos-Uffenorde in Groos-Uffenorde et al.	Early Devonian	Lower Yeraifa Formation	Morocco	A member of Podocopida belonging to the family Quasillitidae.	
Rhinocypris spinata	Sp. nov		Guzmán et al.	Early Cretaceous (Aptian)	Crato Formation	Brazil		
Sansabella gelaohensis	Sp. nov	Valid	Guillam & Forel in Guillam et al.	Devonian (Famennian)	Gelaohe Formation	China	A member of Palaeocopida belonging to the family Sansabellidae.	
Satiellina zarandensis	Sp. nov	Valid	Salas in Poursalehi et al.	Ordovician (Katian–Hirnantian)	Katkoyeh Formation	Iran	A member of Podocopa belonging to the order Beyrichiocopida and the superfamily Drepanelloidea.	
Sulcella baisuzhena	Sp. nov	Valid	Guillam & Forel in Guillam et al.	Devonian (Famennian)	Gelaohe Formation	China	A member of Platycopida belonging to the family Cavellinidae.	
Tegmenia mariasophiae	Sp. nov		Sciuto, Baldanza & Reitano	Early Pleistocene		Italy		
Tenedocythere eleonorae	Sp. nov		Sciuto, Baldanza & Reitano	Early Pleistocene		Italy		
Trachycythere peculiaris	Sp. nov	Valid	Tesakova	Middle Jurassic		Russia		
Tumulocythereis	Gen. et 3 sp. nov	Valid	Puckett & Hunt	Late Cretaceous		United States	Genus includes new species T. incompta, T. tiberti and T. tumulus.	
Velatomorpha pseudoaltilis	Sp. nov	Valid	Bergue et al.	Permian (Guadalupian)	Teresina Formation	Brazil	A member of Platycopida belonging to the family Carbonitidae.	
Velatomorpha xavante	Sp. nov	Valid	Bergue et al.	Permian (Guadalupian)	Teresina Formation	Brazil	A member of Platycopida belonging to the family Carbonitidae.	
Vendona spinifera	Sp. nov	In press	Zhang	Ordovician	Huadan Formation	China		
Zonocypris berthoui	Sp. nov	Valid	Piovesan et al.	Early Cretaceous (Aptian)	Crato Formation	Brazil		
Zonocypris dorsoconvexa	Sp. nov	Valid	Piovesan et al.	Early Cretaceous (Aptian)	Crato Formation	Brazil		

=== Other crustaceans ===
==== New taxa ====
Name	Novelty	Status	Authors	Age	Type locality	Country	Notes	Images
Arcoscalpellum s.l. hamurorum	Sp. nov	Valid	Karasawa & Amano	Miocene	Higashibessho Formation	Japan	A barnacle belonging to the family Scalpellidae.	
Cetopirus polysyrinx	Sp. nov		Collareta et al.	Pleistocene		United States (California; Oregon)	A whale barnacle.	
Dabashanella longa	Sp. nov	In press	Zhang	Cambrian Stage 3	Shuijingtuo Formation	China	A member of Phosphatocopida.	
Dabashanella semiorbiculata	Sp. nov	In press	Zhang	Cambrian Stage 3	Shuijingtuo Formation	China	A member of Phosphatocopida.	
Dabashanella unispinata	Sp. nov	In press	Zhang	Cambrian Stage 3	Shuijingtuo Formation	China	A member of Phosphatocopida.	
Dietericambria	Gen. et sp. nov	Valid	Peel	Cambrian (Wuliuan)	Henson Gletscher Formation	Greenland	A stem-group pentastomid. The type species is D. hensoniensis.	
Heidiops	Gen. et comb. nov	Valid	Werneburg & Schneider	Permian (Kungurian)	Salagou Formation	France	A notostracan of uncertain affinities. The type species is "Triops cancriformis" permiensis Gand, Garric & Lapeyrie (1997), raised to the rank of the species Heidiops permiensis.	
Koonwarrella	Gen. et sp. nov	In press	Van Houte, Hegna & Butler	Early Cretaceous (Aptian)	Koonwarra Fossil Bed	Australia	An anostracan, possibly a member of the family Thamnocephalidae. Genus includes new species K. peterorum.	
Linglongtaestheria qinglongensis	Sp. nov		Teng, Li & Zhang	Late Jurassic	Tiaojishan Formation	China	A clam shrimp.	
Magnitocyclus	Gen. et sp. nov	Valid	Mychko et al.	Carboniferous (Viséan–Serpukhovian)		Russia	A member of Cyclida. Genus includes new species M. struveae.	
Pachyscalpellum saskatchewanensis	Comb. nov	valid	(Russell)	Upper Cretaceous (Maastrichtian)	Bearpaw Formation	Canada (Saskatchewan)	A giant barnacle, formerly known as "Calantica" saskatchewanensis Russell (1967).	
Protochelonibia starnesi	Sp. nov	Valid	Perreault, Collareta & Buckeridge	Oligocene (Rupelian)	Chickasawhay Formation	United States (Mississippi)	A barnacle belonging to the family Chelonibiidae.	
Rhabdostichus arcticensis	Sp. nov	Valid	Shen & Wu	Devonian	Melville Island Formation	Canada	A member of the clam shrimp or ostracod family Rhabdostichidae.	
Thuringiops	Gen. et sp. nov	Valid	Werneburg & Schneider	Carboniferous (Gzhelian) to Permian (Sakmarian)	Upper Oberhof Formation	Germany	A calmanostracan branchiopod, possibly a member of Kazacharthra. The type species is T. nephroides.	
Yanjiestheria huajiyingensis	Sp. nov		Li	Early Cretaceous (Valanginian–Hauterivian)	Huajiying Formation	China	A clam shrimp.	

==== Other crustacean research ====
- Collareta et al. (2022) describe borings on a sea turtle carapace from the Miocene (Tortonian) Pisco Formation (Peru), interpreted as probable attachment scars produced by turtle barnacles, and argue that sea turtles may have hosted barnacle symbionts as early as during the early Oligocene.

== Radiodonts ==
=== New taxa ===
Name	Novelty	Status	Authors	Age	Type locality	Country	Notes	Images
Innovatiocaris maotianshanensis	Gen. et sp. nov	Valid	Zeng et al.	Cambrian Stage 3	Maotianshan Shales	China	A radiodont of uncertain family. Formerly described as Anomalocaris sp. and whole body specimen of "Anomalocaris" saron.	
"Innovatiocaris" multispiniformis	Sp. nov	Valid	Zeng et al.	Cambrian Stage 3	Maotianshan Shales	China	A radiodont of uncertain family.	

=== Radiodont research ===
- New information on the anatomy of Stanleycaris hirpex, based on data from 268 specimens from the Cambrian Burgess Shale (British Columbia, Canada), is presented by Moysiuk & Caron (2022), who report exquisite preservation of the brain of this radiodont and unexpected presence of a large median eye.

== Trilobites ==
=== New taxa ===
Name	Novelty	Status	Authors	Age	Type locality	Location	Notes	Images
Agerina boygeorgei	Sp. nov	Valid	Karim & Adrain	Ordovician (Floian)		United States (Nevada)	A member of the family Phillipsinellidae.	
Aguaditaspis	Gen. et sp. nov	Valid	Randolfe, Rustán & Bignon	Devonian (Lochkovian-Pragian)	Talacasto Formation	Argentina	A member of the family Dalmanitidae. The type species is A. mediaspina.	
Aitkenaspis	Gen. et sp. nov	Valid	Handkamer & Pratt in Handkamer, Pratt & MacNaughton	Cambrian		Canada	Genus includes new species A. keelensis.	
Albertelloides eliasi	Sp. nov	Valid	Handkamer & Pratt in Handkamer, Pratt & MacNaughton	Cambrian		Canada		
Amphitryon constrictus	Sp. nov	In press	Wei & Zhou in Wei et al.	Ordovician (Katian)	Daduhe Formation	China		
Anebocephalus	Gen. et sp. nov	Valid	Sundberg & Webster	Cambrian Stage 4	Harkless Formation	United States (Nevada)	Genus includes new species A. silverpeakensis.	
Arndellaspis	Gen. et sp. nov	Valid	Holloway, Banks & Banks	Silurian (Rhuddanian)	Arndell Sandstone	Australia	A member of the family Encrinuridae. The type species is A. oryxis.	
Auritolithus	Gen. et sp. nov	Valid	Holloway, Banks & Banks	Ordovician (Katian)	Arndell Sandstone	Australia	A member of the family Trinucleidae. The type species is A. corbetti.	
Bignonops	Gen. et comb. nov	Valid	Van Viersen & Kloc	Devonian	Timnrhanrhart Formation	Morocco	Monotypic genus in Acastidae. The type species is B. tamnrhertus.	
Bolbolenellus dodoensis	Sp. nov	Valid	Handkamer & Pratt in Handkamer, Pratt & MacNaughton	Cambrian		Canada		
Brongniartella calveri	Sp. nov	Valid	Holloway, Banks & Banks	Silurian (Rhuddanian)	Arndell Sandstone	Australia	A member of the family Homalonotidae.	
Cambrosaurura	Gen. et comb. et 2 sp. nov	Valid	Geyer in Cederström et al.	Cambrian	Jbel Wawrmast Formation	Morocco	A member of the family Ellipsocephalidae belonging to the subfamily Ellipsocephalinae. The type species is "Ornamentaspis" usitata Geyer (1990); genus also includes new species C. bommeli and C. robusta, and possibly also Ornamentaspis? todraensis Geyer (1990).	
Catillicephala cifellii	Sp. nov	Valid	Westrop & Dengler	Cambrian (Guzhangian)	Shallow Bay Formation	Canada (Newfoundland and Labrador)	A member of the family Catillicephalidae.	
Chelediscus garzoni	Sp. nov	Valid	Collantes et al.	Cambrian Stage 4		Spain		
Clarksonops	Gen. et sp. nov	Disputed	Crônier & Waters	Devonian (Famennian)	Hongguleleng Formation	China	A phacopid trilobite. Genus includes new species C. junggariensis. The genus Clarksonops was subsequently considered to be a junior synonym of the genus Omegops by Zong (2023), resulting in a new combination Omegops junggariensis.	
Coenoides	Gen. et sp. nov	Valid	Sundberg & Webster	Cambrian Stage 4	Harkless Formation	United States (Nevada)	Genus includes new species C. scholteni.	
Cuneoaxiella	Gen. et comb. nov	Valid	Cederström et al.	Cambrian	Gislöv Formation	Morocco; Sweden	A member of the family Ellipsocephalidae belonging to the subfamily Protoleninae. The type species is "Proampyx" grandis Ahlberg & Bergström (1978); genus also includes "Cambrunicornia" agdziensis Geyer (1990).	
Dellingia	Gen. et comb. nov	Valid	Cederström et al.	Cambrian	Gislöv Formation	Sweden	A member of the family Ellipsocephalidae belonging to the subfamily Ellipsocephalinae. The type species is "Comluella" scanica Ahlberg & Bergström (1978).	
Dodoella	Gen. et sp. nov	Valid	Handkamer & Pratt in Handkamer, Pratt & MacNaughton	Cambrian		Canada	Genus includes new species D. kobayashii.	
Ellipsostrenua brevifrons	Sp. nov	Valid	Cederström et al.	Cambrian	Gislöv Formation	Sweden	A member of the family Ellipsocephalidae belonging to the subfamily Ellipsocephalinae.	
Ellipsostrenua simrica	Sp. nov	Valid	Cederström et al.	Cambrian	Gislöv Formation	Sweden	A member of the family Ellipsocephalidae belonging to the subfamily Ellipsocephalinae.	
Ellipsostrenua troedssoni	Sp. nov	Valid	Cederström et al.	Cambrian	Gislöv Formation	Sweden	A member of the family Ellipsocephalidae belonging to the subfamily Ellipsocephalinae.	
Eobathyuriscus	Gen. et 2 sp. nov	Valid	Handkamer & Pratt in Handkamer, Pratt & MacNaughton	Cambrian		Canada	Genus includes new species E. mackenziensis and E. macqueeni.	
Eosaukia anhuiensis	Sp. nov	Valid	Lei & Peng	Cambrian (Furongian)	Chaumitien Formation	China	A saukiid trilobite.	
Epichalnipsus bergstroemi	Sp. nov	Valid	Cederström et al.	Cambrian	Gislöv Formation	Sweden	A member of the family Ellipsocephalidae belonging to the subfamily Strenuaevinae.	
Fantasticolithus	Gen. et sp. nov		Fortey & Gutiérrez-Marco	Early Ordovician		Peru	A trinucleid trilobite. Genus includes new species F. isabelae.	
Forteyaspis	Gen. et 2 sp. et comb. nov	Valid	Karim & Adrain	Ordovician		Canada; United Kingdom	A member of the family Phillipsinellidae. The type species is F. idoli; genus also includes new species F. adamanti, as well as "Agerina" laurentica Ingham & Tripp (1991) and "Agerina" norrisi Ludvigsen (1980).	
Geigibole kohleichensis	Sp. nov	Valid	Müller & Hahn	Carboniferous (Viséan)		Germany		
Glossopleura youngi	Sp. nov	Valid	Handkamer & Pratt in Handkamer, Pratt & MacNaughton	Cambrian		Canada		
Gondwanaspis eisbornensis	Sp. nov	Valid	Helling & Becker	Devonian (probably early Frasnian)	Hagen-Balve Formation	Germany	A member of the family Odontopleuridae.	
Gondwanaspis schloesseri	Sp. nov	Valid	Helling & Becker	Devonian (probably Givetian)	Hofermühle Formation	Germany	A member of the family Odontopleuridae.	
Gravicalymene clarkei	Sp. nov	Valid	Holloway, Banks & Banks	Silurian (Rhuddanian)	Arndell Sandstone	Australia	A member of the family Calymenidae belonging to the subfamily Calymeninae.	
Harklessaspis	Gen. et 2 sp. nov	Valid	Sundberg & Webster	Cambrian Stage 4	Harkless Formation	United States (Nevada)	Genus includes new species H. rasettii and H. parvigranulosus.	
Hollardops angustifrons	Sp. nov	Valid	Van Viersen & Kloc	Devonian	Timrhanrhart Formation	Morocco	A member of the family Acastidae.	
Hollardops klugi	Sp. nov	Valid	Van Viersen & Kloc	Devonian	Seheb El Rhassel Group	Morocco	A member of the family Acastidae.	
Hollardops kyriarchos	Sp. nov	Valid	Van Viersen & Kloc	Devonian	Khebchia Formation	Morocco	A member of the family Acastidae.	
Hollardops luscus	Sp. nov	Valid	Van Viersen & Kloc	Devonian	El Otfal Formation	Morocco	A member of the family Acastidae.	
Hollardops multatuli	Sp. nov	Valid	Van Viersen & Kloc	Devonian	Khebchia Formation	Morocco	A member of the family Acastidae.	
Ivanites	Gen. et sp. nov	Valid	Randolfe, Rustán & Bignon	Devonian (Lochkovian-Pragian)	Talacasto Formation	Argentina	A member of the family Dalmanitidae. The type species is I. leonorae.	
Japonoscutellum senectum	Sp. nov	Valid	Holloway, Banks & Banks	Silurian (Rhuddanian)	Arndell Sandstone	Australia	A member of the family Scutelluidae.	
Kettneraspis palaistis	Sp. nov	Valid	Flick	Devonian		Germany	A member of the family Odontopleuridae.	
Kettneraspis plumula	Sp. nov	Valid	Flick & Flick	Devonian (Eifelian)		Germany	A member of the family Odontopleuridae.	
Kongqiaoheia sarytumensis	Sp. nov	Valid	Ghobadi Pour	Ordovician		Kazakhstan		
Liostracina fuluensis	Sp. nov	Valid	Yang et al.	Cambrian (Guzhangian)	Longha Formation	China	A member of Ptychopariida belonging to the family Liostracinidae.	
Mackenzieaspis	Gen. et 2 sp. nov	Valid	Handkamer & Pratt in Handkamer, Pratt & MacNaughton	Cambrian		Canada	Genus includes new species M. parallelispinosa and M. divergens.	
Malongullia sinensis	Sp. nov	In press	Wei & Zhou in Wei et al.	Ordovician (Katian)	Daduhe Formation	China		
Malongullia zhenxiongensis	Sp. nov	In press	Wei & Zhou in Wei et al.	Ordovician (Katian)	Daduhe Formation	China		
Mexicaspidella	Nom. nov	Not Valid	Handkamer & Pratt in Handkamer, Pratt & MacNaughton	Cambrian		Mexico; United States	A replacement name for Mexicaspis Lochman (1948). Not valid because prior replacement: Caspimexis Özdikmen 2005 in: Paleontological Journal 39(5):563-564	
Miaopopsis sokyrensis	Sp. nov	Valid	Ghobadi Pour	Ordovician		Kazakhstan		
Minicryphaeus suavius	Sp. nov	Valid	Van Viersen & Kloc	Devonian	Seheb El Rhassel Group	Morocco	A member of the family Acastidae.	
Mynaralaspis	Gen. et sp. nov	Valid	Ghobadi Pour	Ordovician		Kazakhstan	Genus includes new species M. perforata.	
Needmorella	Gen. et sp. nov	Valid	Holloway & Scott	Devonian	Needmore Shale	United States (Pennsylvania; Virginia; West Virginia)	A member of the family Dalmanitidae belonging to the subfamily Synphoriinae. The type species is N. simoni.	
Niuchangella agastor	Sp. nov	Valid	Holloway, Banks & Banks	Silurian (Rhuddanian)	Arndell Sandstone	Australia	A member of the family Brachymetopidae.	
Oenonella otherfellersorum	Sp. nov	Valid	Adrain & Fortey	Ordovician (Darriwilian)	Table Cove Formation	Canada (Newfoundland and Labrador)		
Oenonella wasisnamei	Sp. nov	Valid	Adrain & Fortey	Ordovician (Darriwilian)	Table Cove Formation	Canada (Newfoundland and Labrador)		
Pedinopariops? requadti	Sp. nov	Valid	Flick & Flick	Devonian (Eifelian)		Germany	A member of the family Phacopidae.	
Peltura hutchinsoni	Sp. nov	Valid	Nguyen, Westrop & Landing	Cambrian (Furongian)	Chelsey Drive Group	Canada (Nova Scotia)	An olenid trilobite.	
Peltura undulata	Sp. nov		Nielsen et al.	Cambrian (Furongian)	Alum Shale Formation	Norway; Sweden	An olenid trilobite.	
Pepodes	Gen. et sp. nov	Valid	Holloway, Banks & Banks	Silurian (Rhuddanian)	Arndell Sandstone	Australia	A member of the family Illaenidae. The type species is P. agrestis.	
Persiax	Nom. nov	Valid	Lerosey-Aubril & Deshmukh	Carboniferous (Tournaisian)		Iran	A replacement name for Persia Lerosey-Aubril (2012).	
Platykardiapyge	Gen. et comb. nov	Valid	Van Viersen & Kloc	Devonian	Ihandar Formation	Morocco	Genus in Acastidae. The type species is P. maderensis; genus also includes P. aequisulcata.	
Pricyclopyge keralensis	Sp. nov	Valid	Ghobadi Pour	Ordovician		Kazakhstan		
Prosaukia xiaoxianensis	Sp. nov	Valid	Lei & Peng	Cambrian (Furongian)	Chaumitien Formation	China	A saukiid trilobite.	
Sahtuia	Gen. et sp. nov	Valid	Handkamer & Pratt in Handkamer, Pratt & MacNaughton	Cambrian		Canada	Genus includes new species S. carcajouensis.	
Salterocoryphe? bailliei	Sp. nov	Valid	Holloway, Banks & Banks	Ordovician (Katian)	Arndell Sandstone	Australia	A member of the family Calymenidae belonging to the subfamily Colpocoryphinae.	
Sculptoproetus (Macroblepharum) bithynicus	Sp. nov	Valid	Flick & Flick	Devonian (Emsian)		Turkey	A member of the family Proetidae belonging to the subfamily Cornuproetinae.	
Shumardia karasaiensis	Sp. nov	Valid	Ghobadi Pour	Ordovician		Kazakhstan		
Taklamakania paucisegmentatus	Sp. nov	In press	Wei & Zhou in Wei et al.	Ordovician (Katian)	Daduhe Formation	China		
Toxotiformis	Gen. et comb. et 5 sp. nov	Valid	Makarova	Cambrian		Russia	The type species is "Toxotis" venustus Lazarenko (1968); genus also includes new species T. artus, T. kotuyensis, T. nelegensis, T. tuberculosus and T. ventosus.	
Triarthrus akkermensis	Sp. nov	Valid	Ghobadi Pour	Ordovician		Kazakhstan		
Vietnamia hyron	Sp. nov	Valid	Holloway, Banks & Banks	Ordovician (Katian)	Arndell Sandstone	Australia	A member of the family Calymenidae belonging to the subfamily Reedocalymeninae.	

=== Trilobite research ===
- A study on patterns of segment allocation and expression in the bodies of trilobites throughout their evolutionary history is published by Hopkins & To (2022), who argue that neither taxonomic turnover nor enrolment behaviour of trilobites can sufficiently explain the studied changes of segmentation patterns.
- A study on the early evolutionary history of trilobites is published by Holmes & Budd (2022), who argue that the first appearance datum of trilobites in the fossil record closely reflects their evolutionary origins, and that there is no compelling evidence to suggest an extended cryptic evolutionary history for this group.
- Bicknell et al. (2022) describe malformed trilobite specimens from the Cambrian Beetle Creek Formation (Australia), Chisholm Formation (Nevada, United States) and Wheeler Formation (Utah, United States) and from the Ordovician Llanfawr Mudstones (Wales, United Kingdom), and attempt to determine the origin of the studied injuries.
- A study on the injured specimens of Redlichia takooensis and Redlichia rex from the Cambrian Emu Bay Shale (Australia) is published by Bicknell et al. (2022), who argue that R. rex was likely the chief producer of the injuries in the studied specimen and of large shelly coprolites in the Emu Bay Shale biota, and represents one of the earliest cannibalistic trilobites.
- Losso & Ortega-Hernández (2022) report evidence of the presence of significantly modified and reduced endopodites underneath the seventh thoracic and first pygidial tergites of Olenoides serratus and interpret these appendages as likely functional analogs to claspers.
- A study on the phylogenetic relationships of members of the olenid group Hypermecaspidinae is published by Monti, Tortello & Confalonieri (2022).
- Revision of Ordovician trilobite collections from Shan State (Myanmar) and Yunnan (China), first described by F.R.C. Reed, is published by Fortey, Wernette & Hughes (2022).
- A study on the growth and mortality of Triarthrus eatoni, reevaluating the data presented by Cisne (1973), is published by Pauly & Holmes (2022).
- Edgecombe & Fortey (2022) describe a specimen of Asaphellus tataensis from the Fezouata Formation (Morocco) preserved with antennae bearing a series of round, dome-shaped organs of uncertain homology and function, larger than sensilla on the antennae of other arthropods.
- A study on the degree and structure of modularity in the heads of Calyptaulax annulata and Cloacaspis senilis is published by Vargas-Parra & Hopkins (2022), who consider the best modularity models to be those in which the eyes and anteriormost cranidium formed a single module, or belonged to two modules that highly covaried relative to other modules.
- Bicknell & Smith (2022) seven new abnormal specimens of Odontopleura (Sinespinaspis) markhami from the Silurian (Telychian) Cotton Formation (Australia), interpreting their abnormalities as teratological developments through genetic malfunctions, and evaluate likely causes of abnormalities in Silurian trilobite specimens in general.
- A study on the distribution patterns of Devonian trilobites from Morocco and northwestern Algeria through time and space is published by Bault, Crônier & Bignon (2022).
- A study on the morphological diversity and possible relationship between morphology and environmental and/or ecological factors in Devonian trilobites from North Africa is published by Bault, Crônier & Monnet (2022).
- A study on changes in global distribution of trilobites during the late Paleozoic is published by Brezinski (2022).
- A study on functional morphology, coaptation and palaeoecology of selected acastid trilobites was published by Van Viersen & Kloc (2022).
- A study on the morphological diversity of cephalic sclerites of asteropygine acastids throughout their evolutionary history is published by Martin et al. (2022).

== Other arthropods ==
=== New taxa ===
Name	Novelty	Status	Authors	Age	Type locality	Country	Notes	Images
Acheronauta	Gen. et sp. nov	Valid	Pulsipher et al.	Silurian	Waukesha Lagerstätte	United States (Wisconsin)	A vermiform arthropod, possibly a basal member of Mandibulata. Genus includes new species A. stimulapis.	
Astutuscaris	Gen. et sp. nov	Valid	Jiao & Du	Cambrian Stage 4	Wulongqing Formation	China	A member of Euarthropoda of uncertain affinities. The type species is A. bispinifer.	
Balhuticaris	Gen. et sp. nov	Valid	Izquierdo-López & Caron	Cambrian	Burgess Shale	Canada (British Columbia)	A bivalved arthropod belonging to the group Hymenocarina. The type species is B. voltae.	
Cyrtoctenus bambachi	Sp. nov	Valid	Plotnick & Lamsdell	Carboniferous (Tournaisian)	Price Formation	United States (Virginia)	A hibbertopterid eurypterid.	
Erettopterus qujingensis	Sp. nov	Valid	Ma et al.	Silurian (Pridolí)	Yulongsi Formation	China	A pterygotid eurypterid.	
Erratus	Gen. et sp. nov		Fu et al.	Cambrian Stage 3	Helinpu Formation	China	An early carapace-bearing arthropod. The type species is E. sperare.	
Fengzhengia	Gen. et sp. nov	Valid	O'Flynn et al.	Cambrian Stage 3	Chiungchussu Formation	China	A member of Euarthropoda of uncertain affinities. The type species is F. mamingae.	
Guangyuanolimulus	Gen. et sp. nov		Hu et al.	Permian-Triassic transition		China	A member of Xiphosura, possibly an early horseshoe crab. Genus includes new species G. shangsiensis.	
Hibbertopterus lamsdelli	Sp. nov	In press	Braddy, Lerner & Lucas	Late Carboniferous		United States (New Mexico)	A eurypterid.	
Lunataspis borealis	Sp. nov	In press	Lamsdell et al.	Ordovician (Sandbian)	Gull River Formation	Canada (Ontario)	A member of Xiphosurida.	
Malongia	Gen. et sp. nov		Wang et al.	Devonian (Lochkovian)	Xiaxishancun Formation	China	A eurypterid belonging to the family Dolichopteridae. Genus includes new species M. mirabilis.	
Masticaris	Gen. et sp. nov	Valid	Harvey & Butterfield	Cambrian Stage 4	Mount Clark Formation	Canada (Northwest Territories)	An arthropod described on the basis of mandibles co-occurring with small carbonaceous fossils. The type species is M. fimbriata.	
Mieridduryn	Gen. et sp. nov	Valid	Pates et al.	Ordovician (Darriwilian)	Gilwern Volcanic Formation	United Kingdom	An opabiniid-like stem-arthropod. The type species is M. bonniae.	
Monstrodesmus grimaldii	Sp. nov	Valid	Su, Cai & Huang	Cretaceous	Burmese amber	Myanmar	A millipede belonging to the family Trichopolydesmidae.	
Paleolimulus mazonensis	Sp. nov	Valid	Bicknell, Naugolnykh & McKenzie	Carboniferous (Moscovian)	Carbondale Formation	United States (Illinois)	A member of Xiphosura belonging to the family Paleolimulidae.	
Parahughmilleria fuea	Sp. nov		Ma et al.	Devonian (Lochkovian)	Xiaxishancun Formation	China	An adelophthalmid eurypterid.	
Pterygotus wanggaii	Sp. nov		Ma et al.	Devonian (Lochkovian)	Xiaxishancun Formation	China	A pterygotid eurypterid.	
Tomlinsonus	Gen. et sp. nov	Valid	Moysiuk et al.	Ordovician (Katian)	Kirkfield Formation	Canada (Ontario)	A marrellomorph arthropod. The type species is T. dimitrii.	
Utahnax	Gen. et sp. nov	Valid	Lerosey-Aubril & Ortega-Hernández	Cambrian (Drumian)		United States (Utah)	A Dinocaridid. The type species is U. vannieri.	
Utaurora	Gen. et sp. nov	Valid	Pates et al.	Cambrian (Drumian)	Wheeler Formation	United States (Utah)	An opabiniid. The type species is U. comosa.	
Vermontcaris	Gen. et sp. nov	Valid	Pari, Briggs & Gaines	Cambrian Stage 4		United States (Vermont)	A bivalved arthropod. Genus includes new species V. montcalmi.	

- Redescription of Chuandianella ovata, based on data from new specimens from the Yu'anshan Member of the Chiungchussu Formation (Cambrian Stage 3; Yunnan, China) preserving unprecedented details of their soft anatomy, is published by Zhai et al. (2022).
- A study on the ventral aspect of head organization of Jianfengia multisegmentalis, and on its evolutionary significance, is published by Zhang et al. (2022).
- Redescription of Triopus draboviensis is published by Van Roy, Rak & Fatka (2022), who also provide a revised diagnosis for Cheloniellida, and exclude Parioscorpio venator from this clade.
- Redescription of the ventral morphology of Retifacies abnormalis and a study on the implications of this taxon for the knowledge of the relationships and evolution of Cambrian artiopods is published by Zhang et al. (2022).
- A study on the appendicular organization in Pygmaclypeatus daziensis and on its ecological and evolutionary implications is published by Schmidt et al. (2022).
- Description of the organization of the central nervous system of a specimen of Mollisonia symmetrica from the Burgess Pass (Burgess Shale; British Columbia, Canada) is published by Ortega-Hernández et al. (2022).
- A study on the evolutionary stability in the history of fossil and living xiphosurids is published by Bicknell et al. (2022).
- Revision of Australian xiphosurids Austrolimulus fletcheri, Dubbolimulus peetae, Tasmaniolimulus patersoni and Victalimulus mcqueeni, and a study on the temporal range of these taxa is published by Bicknell et al. (2022), who reinterpret T. patersoni as living in the Triassic rather than Permian.
- New specimen of Vaderlimulus tricki, providing new information on the anatomy of this xiphosuran and representing the first record of muscles in an austrolimulid reported to date, is described from the Olenekian Thaynes Group (Idaho, United States) by Lerner & Lucas (2022).
- A study on the ontogenetic stages, allometry and ecology of Paleolimulus kunguricus is published by Naugolnykh & Bicknell (2022).
- A study on the anatomy of the chelicerae of Slimonia acuminata, based on data from a new specimen, is published by Lamsdell (2022).
- Braddy & Gass (2022) redescribe tracks from the Ordovician Martinsburg Formation (New York, United States) assigned to the ichnotaxon Palmichnium gallowayi, attribute these tracks to a medium-sized stylonurid eurypterid, and interpret them as the earliest trace fossil evidence for mass migrations of eurypterids into nearshore environments to molt and mate.
- Biomechanical study of the chelicerae of pterygotid eurypterids is published by Bicknell et al. (2022), who argue that pterygotid chelicerae were functionally analogous to scorpion chelae, and that Erettopterus bilobus and Pterygotus anglicus had a generalised diet and were apex predators of their ecosystems, while Acutiramus bohemicus was adapted to piercing and slicing the cuticle of other eurypterids, and Jaekelopterus rhenaniae was adapted to capturing large, highly mobile, armoured prey.
- New fossil material of Tuzoia with exceptionally preserved soft tissues is described from the Cambrian Burgess Shale (Canada) by Izquierdo-López & Caron (2022), who interpret this arthropod as adapted to predation or scavenging while swimming along the seafloor, and interpret it as an early member of Hymenocarina.
- A study on the functional morphology of Ercaicunia multinodosa, aiming to determine the posture used by this arthropod to overcome resistance and to obtain most lift while sliding in the water column, is published by Li et al. (2022).

== General research ==
- Review of the paleontological, phylogenomic and molecular clock evidence pertaining to the possibly Cambrian terrestrialization of the arthropods is published Tihelka et al. (2022).
