= Cytherella fragum =

Scientific classification
- Kingdom: Animalia
- Phylum: Arthropoda
- Clade: Pancrustacea
- Class: Ostracoda
- Order: Platycopida
- Family: Cytherellidae
- Genus: Cytherella
- Species: C. fragum

Binomial name
- Cytherella fragum Jellinek, 1993

Species of seed shrimp

Cytherella fragum is a species of seed shrimp in the family Cytherellidae.
