= Bispinitiidae =

Scientific classification
- Kingdom: Animalia
- Phylum: Arthropoda
- Clade: Pancrustacea
- Class: Ostracoda
- Order: Palaeocopida
- Superfamily: †Leperditelloidea
- Family: †Bispinitiidae; Abushik, 1990

Family of ostracods

Bispinitiidae is an extinct family of ostracods in the order Palaeocopida. It was described by Anna Fedosovna Abushik in 1990 and is one of eight families in the superfamily Leperditelloidea.

== Genera ==
The following genera are recognized:

- †Bispinitia Abushik, 1962
- †Yukopsis Copeland, 1966
