= Callistocythere elegans =

Scientific classification
- Kingdom: Animalia
- Phylum: Arthropoda
- Clade: Pancrustacea
- Class: Ostracoda
- Order: Podocopida
- Family: Leptocytheridae
- Genus: Callistocythere
- Species: C. elegans

Binomial name
- Callistocythere elegans (Mueller, 1894)

Synonyms
- Cythere elegans Mueller, 1894

Species of seed shrimp

Callistocythere elegans is a species of ostracods. It is from the Gulf of Naples, Italy.
