= Cytherella =

Scientific classification
- Kingdom: Animalia
- Phylum: Arthropoda
- Clade: Pancrustacea
- Class: Ostracoda
- Order: Platycopida
- Family: Cytherellidae
- Genus: Cytherella; Jones, 1849

Species
- See text

Synonyms
- Cythere (Cytherella) Jones, 1849

Genus of seed shrimp

Cytherella is a genus of seed shrimp in the family Cytherellidae.

== Species ==
The World Register of Marine Species lists the following species as accepted in the genus Cytherella.

- Cytherella abyssorum Sars, 1866
- Cytherella adenensis Malz & Jellinek, 1989
- Cytherella africana Scott, 1894
- Cytherella altacaelateralis Nogueira, Ramos & Hunt, 2019 †
- Cytherella alvearium Bonaduce, Ciampo & Masoli, 1976
- Cytherella areolata Seguenza, 1885 †
- Cytherella arostrata Kornicker, 1963
- Cytherella ascia
- Cytherella ballangei Milhau, 1993 †
- Cytherella banda Benson, 1959
- Cytherella bathyalis Bonaduce, Ciliberto, Masoli, Minichelli & Pugliese, 1982
- Cytherella beibuwanensis Liu, 1981 †
- Cytherella bensoni Dingle, 1984 †
- Cytherella bermaguiensis Yassini & Jones, 1995
- Cytherella bermudensis Maddocks in Maddocks & Iliffe, 1986
- Cytherella bigemina Mostafawi, 2003
- Cytherella bipartita Seguenza, 1880 †
- Cytherella bissoni Milhau, 1993 †
- Cytherella bradyi Seguenza, 1880 †
- Cytherella brettingi Mohammed & Keyser, 2012
- Cytherella caepae Hu & Tao, 2008
- Cytherella calabra Seguenza, 1880 †
- Cytherella carmela Sciuto, 2015 †
- Cytherella centrocompressa Barros, Piovesan & Agostinho, 2018 †
- Cytherella cercinata Aiello, Barra, Bonaduce & Russo, 1996 †
- Cytherella charmant Milhau, 1993 †
- Cytherella chipolensis Puri, 1954 †
- Cytherella cincta Malz & Jellinek, 1989
- Cytherella circumpunctata Ciampo, 1976 †
- Cytherella complanata (Reuss, 1844) Reuss, 1854 †
- Cytherella compressa (Muenster, 1830)
- Cytherella consanguinea Seguenza, 1880 †
- Cytherella corpusculum Swanson, Jellinek & Malz, 2005
- Cytherella cribrosa Brady, 1880
- Cytherella cuneata Seguenza, 1886
- Cytherella cuneiformis Hartmann, 1974
- Cytherella cuneolus Brady, 1870
- Cytherella dictyon Malz & Jellinek, 1989
- Cytherella dilatata (Reuss, 1850) Kollmann, 1960 †
- Cytherella discostata (Whatley, Cooke & Warne, 1995)
- Cytherella dromedaria Brady, 1880
- Cytherella eburnea Brady, 1898
- Cytherella eburnea Witte, 1993
- Cytherella elliptica Brady, 1878
- Cytherella eros Nunes & Campos, 2021 †
- Cytherella fimbricinctus Sutton & Williams, 1939 †
- Cytherella fischeri Terquem, 1878
- Cytherella fragum Jellinek, 1993
- Cytherella gambiensis Apostolescu, 1963 †
- Cytherella gingensis (Waagen, 1867) †
- Cytherella gloria Coryell & Sample, 1932 †
- Cytherella grindrodiana (Jones & Holl, 1869) Bassler & Kellett, 1934 †
- Cytherella grossmani Benson & Coleman, 1963
- Cytherella gunnelli Morey, 1935 †
- Cytherella harpago Kornicker, 1963
- Cytherella harrymutvei Stambolidis, 1980
- Cytherella hemipuncta Swanson, 1969 †
- Cytherella hermargentina Whatley, Moguilevsky, Chadwick, Toy & Ramos, 1998
- Cytherella hiatus Swanson, Jellinek & Malz, 2005
- Cytherella hispida Seguenza, 1880 †
- Cytherella incohata Zhao (Yi-Chun) & Whatley, 1989
- Cytherella interpunctata Malz & Jellinek, 1989
- Cytherella intonsa Swanson, Jellinek & Malz, 2005
- Cytherella intumescens Reed, 1927 †
- Cytherella iowensis (Jones, Kirkby & Brady, 1884) Bassler & Kellett, 1934 †
- Cytherella iraqiensis Ubide & Khalaf, 2010 †
- Cytherella japonica Ishizaki, 1983 †
- Cytherella javaseaensis Dewi, 1997
- Cytherella joalensis Witte, 1993
- Cytherella jonesi Neale, 1975 †
- Cytherella kellettae (Munsey, 1953) Bold, 1960 †
- Cytherella kempfi Nogueira, Ramos & Hunt, 2019 †
- Cytherella kingstonensis McKenzie, Reyment & Reyment, 1990
- Cytherella kirkukiensis Ubide & Khalaf, 2010 †
- Cytherella kornickeri Maddocks in Maddocks & Iliffe, 1986
- Cytherella laevis Brady, 1867
- Cytherella laevis (Williamson, 1847) Jones, Kirkby & Brady, 1884 †
- Cytherella laganella (Brady, 1880) Sharapova, 1937
- Cytherella lata Brady, 1880
- Cytherella leizhouensis Gou in Gou, Zheng & Huang, 1983 †
- Cytherella londinensis Jones, 1857 †
- Cytherella luciae Seguenza, 1886
- Cytherella lucida Seguenza, 1880 †
- Cytherella ludbrookae Neale, 1975 †
- Cytherella lustris Luebimova, 1965 †
- Cytherella maculosa Malz & Jellinek, 1989
- Cytherella maddocks Lerner-Seggev, 1972
- Cytherella maremensis Artüz, Gülen & Kubanç, 2013
- Cytherella mejanguerensis Hartmann, 1959
- Cytherella micrometrica Seguenza, 1886
- Cytherella mientienensis (Grabau, 1926) Bassler & Kellett, 1934 †
- Cytherella minutissima Hao (Yi-Chun) in Ruan & Hao (Yi-Chun), 1988
- Cytherella mushoriensis Ubide & Khalaf, 2010 †
- Cytherella namibensis Dingle, 1992
- Cytherella nitida Brady, 1869
- Cytherella notossinuosa Nogueira, Ramos & Hunt, 2019 †
- Cytherella nyssa Hao (Yi-Chun) in Ruan & Hao (Yi-Chun), 1988
- Cytherella obtusata Müller, 1912
- Cytherella ochthodes Doruk, 1976 †
- Cytherella olosa Omatsola, 1970
- Cytherella omatsolai Hartmann, 1974
- Cytherella ondaatjei Scott, 1905
- Cytherella optima Ruan in Ruan & Hao (Yi-Chun), 1988
- Cytherella ovalis Brady, 1911
- Cytherella ovalis Terquem, 1885 †
- Cytherella ovalis (Stoddart, 1861) Jones, Kirkby & Brady, 1884 †
- Cytherella ovata (Roemer, 1841) †
- Cytherella ovularia Swain, 1967
- Cytherella pandora Kornicker, 1963
- Cytherella papillosolineata Seguenza, 1886
- Cytherella paraibensis Barros, Piovesan & Agostinho, 2018 †
- Cytherella parallela (Reuss, 1844) Reuss, 1854 †
- Cytherella paranitida Whatley & Downing, 1984 †
- Cytherella pelotensis Manica, Bergue & Coimbra, 2015 †
- Cytherella permutata Swanson, Jellinek & Malz, 2005
- Cytherella pindoramensis Bergue & Coimbra in Bergue et al., 2021
- Cytherella pinnata McKenzie, Reyment & Reyment, 1993 †
- Cytherella pleistocenica Bergue, Coimbra & Cronin, 2007 †
- Cytherella plusminusve Swanson, Jellinek & Malz, 2005
- Cytherella polita Brady, 1869
- Cytherella ponderosa Witte, 1993
- Cytherella pori Lerner-Seggev, 1964
- Cytherella postagrena Boomer, 1999 †
- Cytherella posterodorsodirecta Andreu-Boussut, 1991 †
- Cytherella posterospinosa Boomer, 1999 †
- Cytherella posterotuberculata Kingma, 1948 †
- Cytherella proxima Coryell & Sample, 1932 †
- Cytherella pulchra Brady, 1866
- Cytherella pumila Scott, 1894
- Cytherella pumpkinae Hu & Tao, 2008
- Cytherella punctata Brady, 1866
- Cytherella pyriformis (Cornuel, 1846) †
- Cytherella reticulata Seguenza, 1886
- Cytherella retroflexa Mostafawi, 2003
- Cytherella richteriana (Jones, 1859) Bassler & Kellett, 1934 †
- Cytherella rizzolensis Seguenza, 1886
- Cytherella robusta Colalongo & Pasini, 1980 †
- Cytherella russoiforma Dykan, 2020
- Cytherella rwhatleyi Brandão, 2008
- Cytherella sangiranensis Kingma, 1948 †
- Cytherella santosensis Bergue, Coimbra & Cronin, 2007 †
- Cytherella saraballentae Ceoli, Whatley, Fauth & Concheyro, 2015 †
- Cytherella scotica Brady, 1867
- Cytherella scutulum Ruggieri, 1976 †
- Cytherella semitalis Brady, 1868
- Cytherella sericea Mostafawi, 2003
- Cytherella serpentiensis Bold, 1960 †
- Cytherella serratula (Brady, 1880)
- Cytherella serrulata Brady & Norman, 1896
- Cytherella shengmu Hu & Tao, 2008 †
- Cytherella shiranishensis Ubide & Khalaf, 2010 †
- Cytherella sicula Seguenza, 1886
- Cytherella similis Brady, 1870
- Cytherella speciosa Hu & Tao, 2008 †
- Cytherella stainforthi Bold, 1960 †
- Cytherella texana Stadnichenko, 1927 †
- Cytherella textum Holden, 1976 †
- Cytherella thrakiensis Stambolidis, 1980
- Cytherella truncata Brady, 1869
- Cytherella truncata (Bosquet, 1847) Jones, 1870 †
- Cytherella truncatoides Slipper, 2019 †
- Cytherella tumidosa Alexander, 1934 †
- Cytherella turgidula Alexander, 1934 †
- Cytherella tyronica (Jones, 1859) Bassler & Kellett, 1934 †
- Cytherella vandenboldi Sissingh, 1972 †
- Cytherella ventercavus Santos Filho, Fauth & Piovesan, 2016 †
- Cytherella venusta Brady, 1880
- Cytherella vermillionensis Kontrovitz, 1976
- Cytherella vesiculosa Chapman, 1902
- Cytherella vizcainoensis McKenzie & Swain, 1967
- Cytherella vraspillaii Scott, 1905
- Cytherella vulgata Ruggieri, 1962 †
- Cytherella vulgatella Aiello, Barra, Bonaduce & Russo, 1996
- Cytherella vulna Slipper, 2019 †
- Cytherella watkinsi Coryell & Sample, 1932 †
- Cytherella weaveri Slipper, 2019 †
- Cytherella yangchieni Hu & Tao, 2008 †
- Cytherella yaoshou Hu & Tao, 2008
