= Leperditiidae =

Scientific classification
- Kingdom: Animalia
- Phylum: Arthropoda
- Clade: Pancrustacea
- Class: Ostracoda
- Order: Palaeocopida
- Superfamily: †Leperditelloidea
- Family: †Leperditiidae; Jones, 1856

Family of ostracods

Leperditiidae is an extinct family of ostracods in the order Palaeocopida. It was described in 1856 and is one of eight families in the superfamily Leperditelloidea.

== Genera ==
The following genera are recognized:

- †Anisochilina Teichert, 1937
- †Antitomis Guerich, 1896
- †Briartina Kegel, 1933
- †Chevroleperditia Swartz, 1949
- †Herrmannina Kegel, 1934
- †Leperditella Ulrich, 1894
- †Leperditia Rouault, 1851
- †Moorea Jones & Kirkby, 1869
- †Parabriartina Berdan, 1984
- †Pinnatulites Hessland, 1949
- †Pseudoaparchites Krandijevsky, 1963
- †Saffordellina Bassler & Kellett, 1934
- †Schmidtella Ulrich, 1892
- †Swartzochilina Scott, 1956
