= Leperditellidae =

Scientific classification
- Kingdom: Animalia
- Phylum: Arthropoda
- Clade: Pancrustacea
- Class: Ostracoda
- Order: Palaeocopida
- Superfamily: †Leperditelloidea
- Family: †Leperditellidae; Ulrich & Bassler, 1906

Family of ostracods

Leperditellidae is an extinct family of ostracods in the order Palaeocopida. It was described by E. O. Ulrich and R. S. Bassler in 1906 and is one of eight families in the superfamily Leperditelloidea.

== Genera ==
The following genera are recognized:

- †Bonneprimites Swartz & Whitmore, 1956
- †Zaborovia Polenova, 1952
