= Leperditelloidea =

Scientific classification
- Kingdom: Animalia
- Phylum: Arthropoda
- Clade: Pancrustacea
- Class: Ostracoda
- Order: Palaeocopida
- Superfamily: †Leperditelloidea; Ulrich & Bassler, 1906

Family of ostracods

Leperditelloidea is an extinct superfamily of ostracods in the order Palaeocopida. It was described by Ulrich and Bassler in 1906 and is subdivided into eight families.

== Families ==
The following families are recognized:

- †Bispinitiidae Abushik, 1990
- †Ceratoleperditiidae Abushik, 1990
- †Leperditellidae Ulrich & Bassler, 1906
- †Leperditiidae Jones, 1856
- †Moelleritiidae Abushik, 1990
- †Primitiidae Ulrich & Bassler, 1923
- †Sibiritiidae Abushik, 1990
- †Tollitiidae Abushik, 1990
