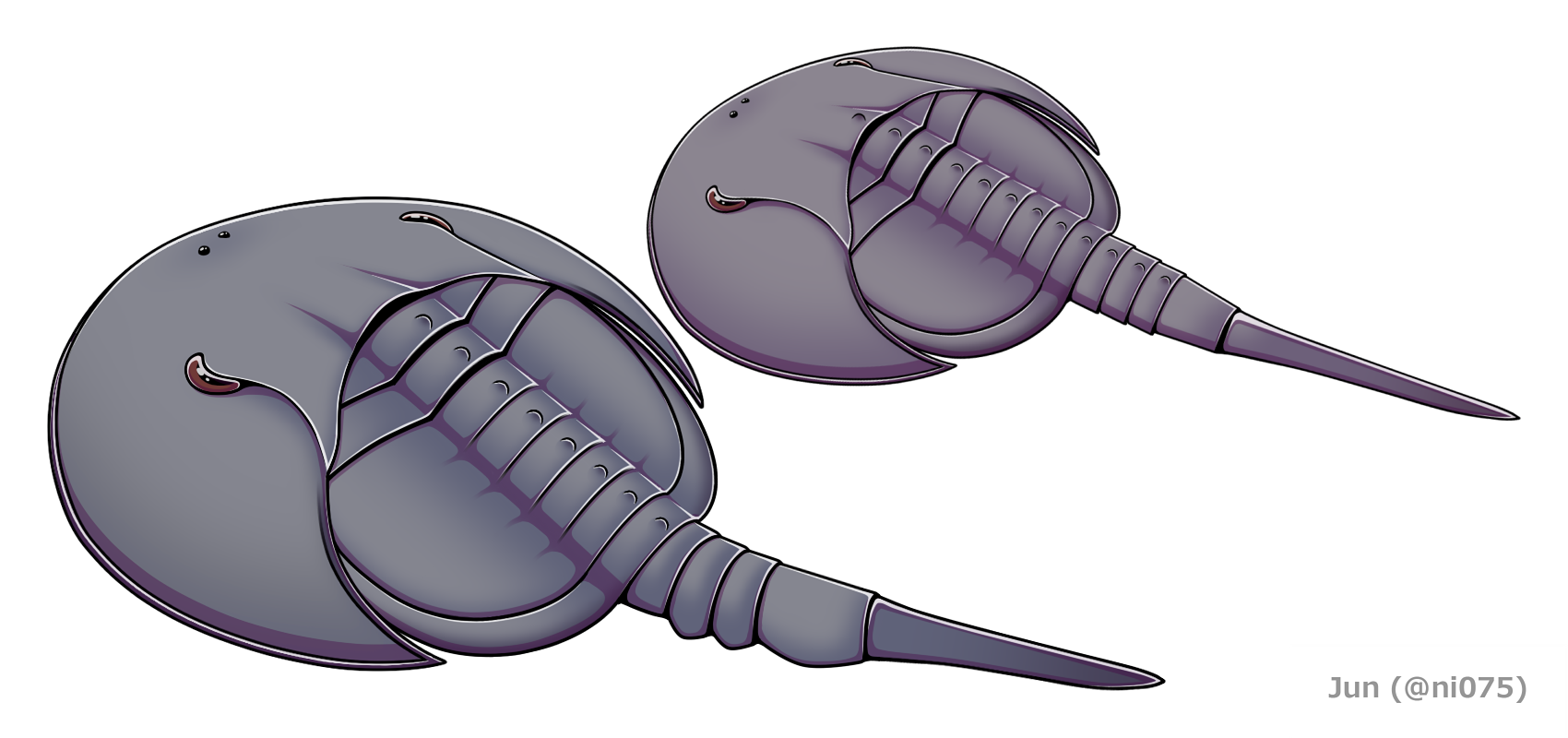
- Reconstruction of Lunataspis aurora (bottom left) and Lunataspis borealis (top right)

Scientific classification
- Kingdom: Animalia
- Phylum: Arthropoda
- Subphylum: Chelicerata
- Order: Xiphosura
- Genus: †Lunataspis; Rudkin, Young & Nowlan, 2008

Type species
- †Lunataspis aurora Rudkin, Young & Nowlan, 2008

Species
- †L. aurora Rudkin, Young & Nowlan, 2008; †L. borealis Lamsdell et al.., 2022; †L. gundersoni Lamsdell et al.., 2025

= Lunataspis =

Lunataspis Temporal range: 455–445 Ma Latest Sandbian to Earliest Hirnantian

Genus of horseshoe crab relatives

Lunataspis is the oldest known xiphosuran, with three known species all dating from the late Ordovician (latest Sandbian for L. borealis, Katian for L. gundersoni, earliest Hirnantian for L. aurora).

== Discovery and species ==
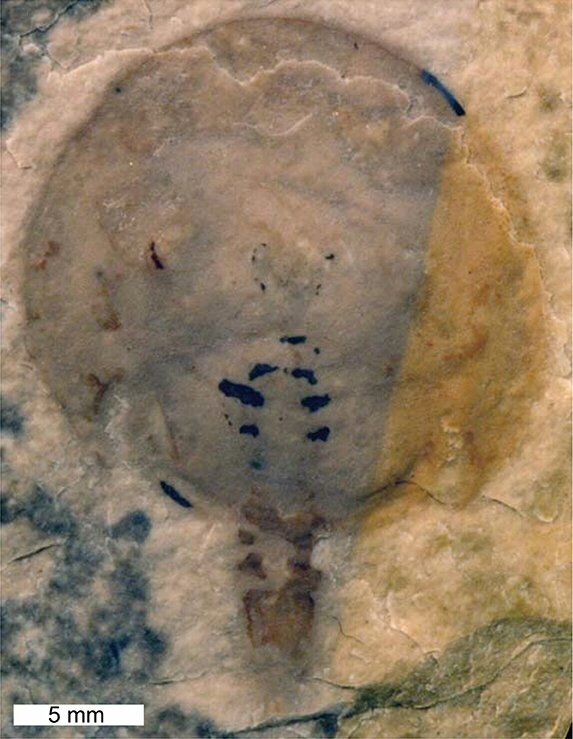
Holotype of Lunataspis aurora

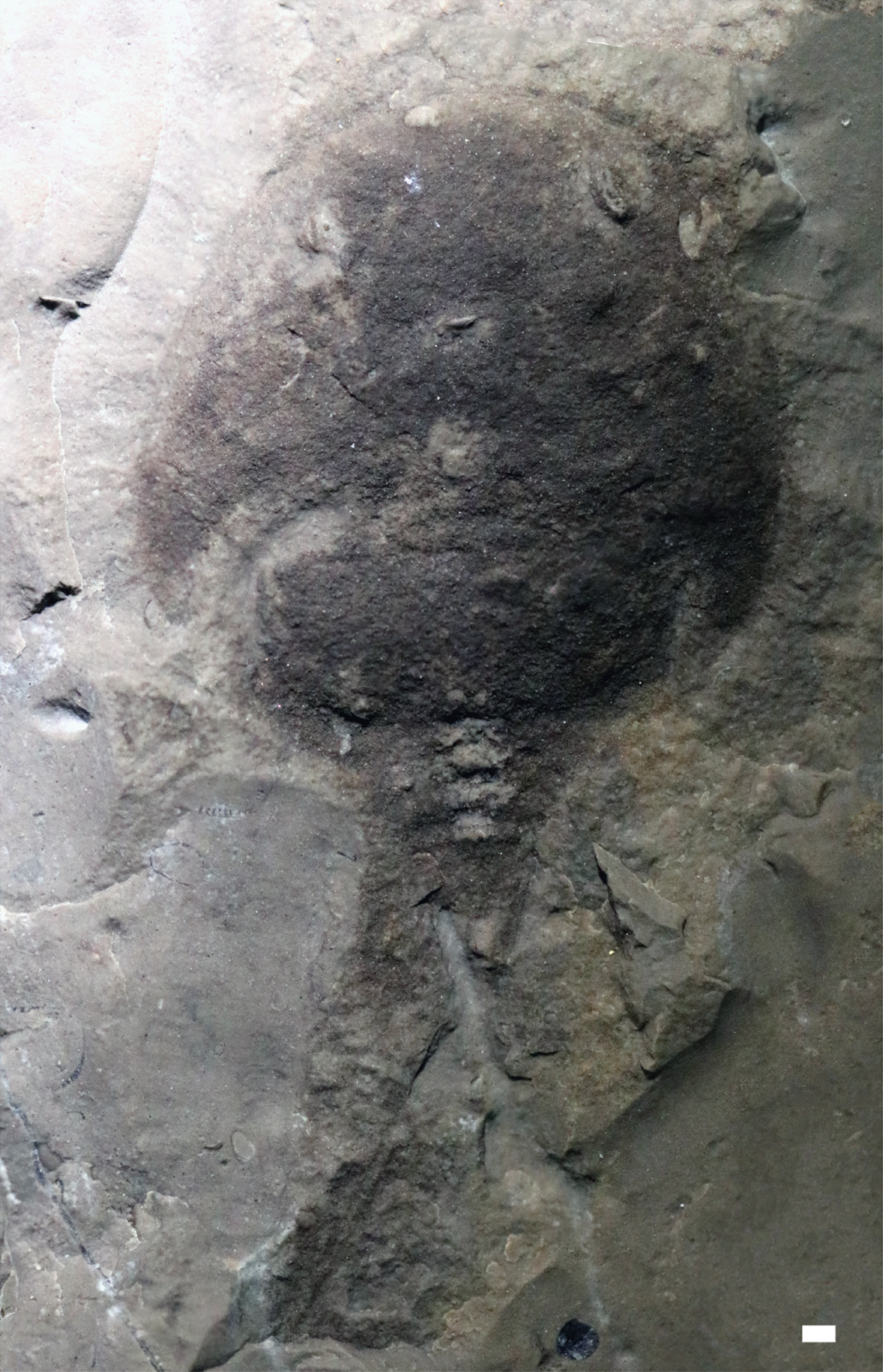
Holotype of Lunataspis borealis

The type species, L. aurora, was described from remains found in the Konservat-Lagerstätten deposits of the Stony Mountain Formation, central Manitoba by David Rudkin, Graham Young and Godfrey Nolan, from fossils found in northern Manitoba, Canada in 2005. The specific name aurora is Latin for 'dawn' and is also eponymous with the mythological Roman goddess. The deposit dates from the Late Ordovician, earliest Hirnantian c. 445 million years ago.

A second species, L. borealis, was described in 2022 based on three specimens, including an adult (ROM IP 64616) and two juveniles or subadults (ROM IP 64617 and ROM IP 64618). All specimens were found in the upper member of the Gull River Formation in Kingston, Ontario, dating from the latest Sandbian, late Ordovician, c. 454 million years ago. This site was a warm-water platform shelf at the time near the paleo-equator.

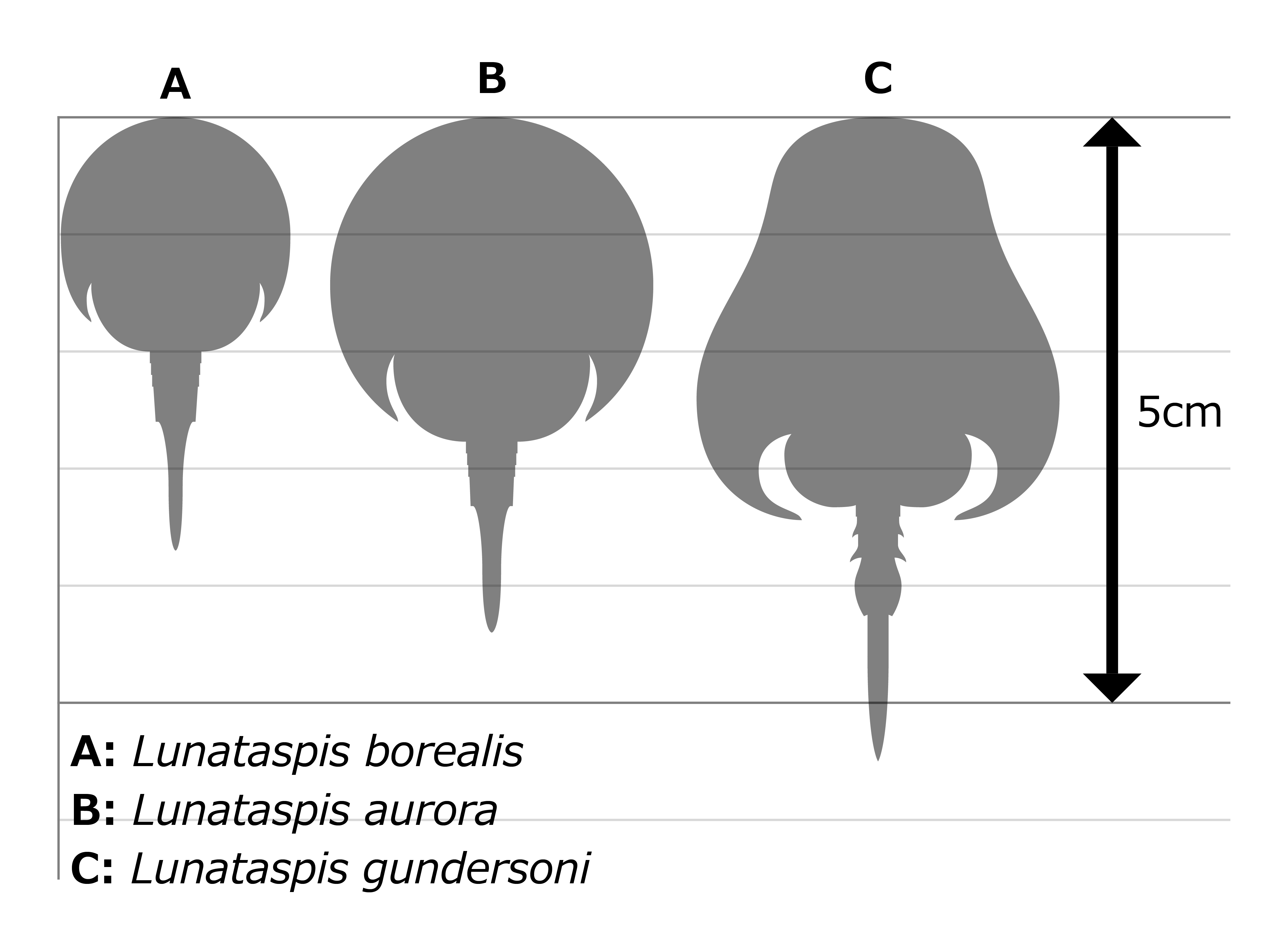
Size comparison of the three Lunataspis species

L. aurora

L. borealis

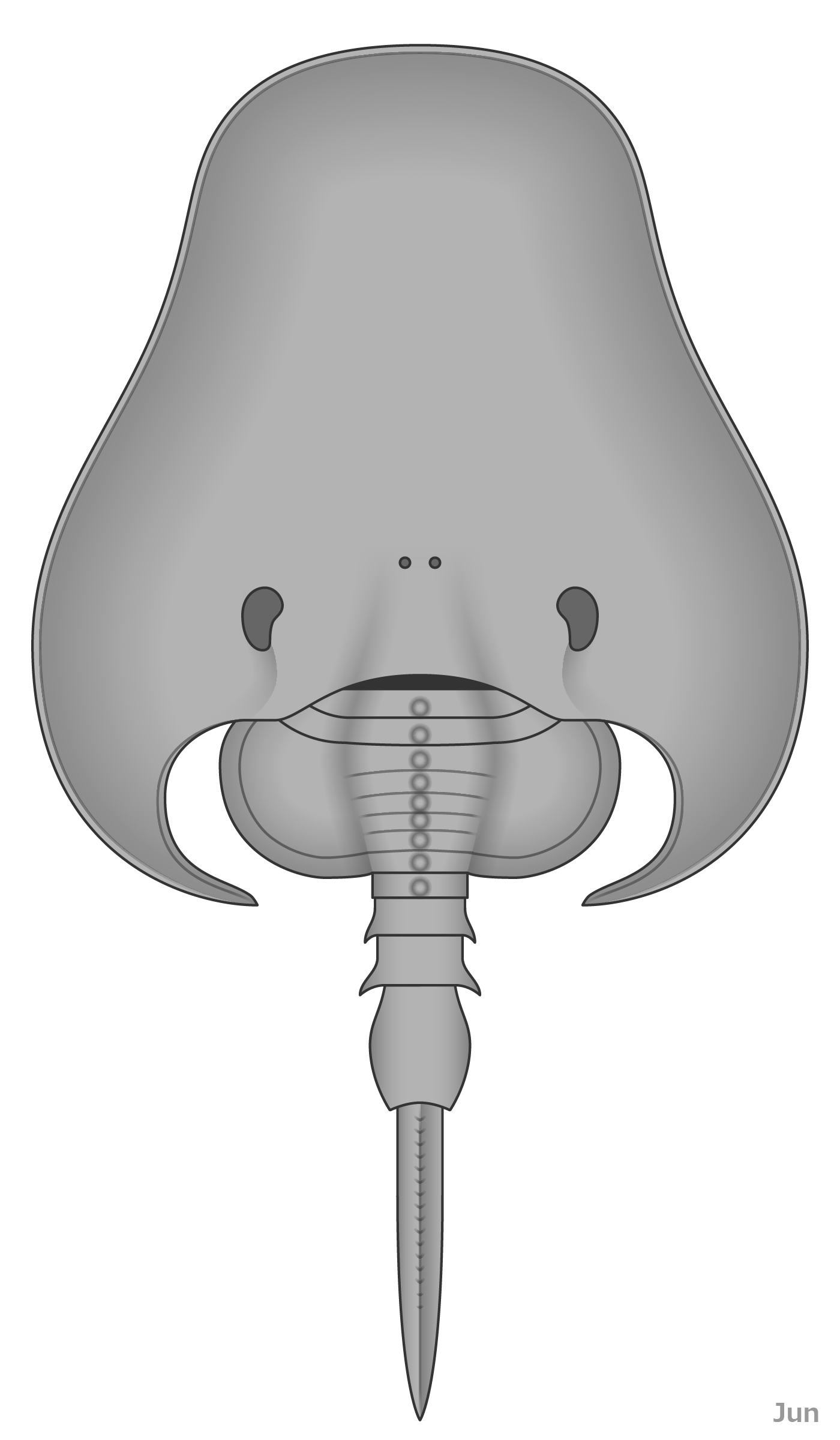
L. gundersoni

A third species, L. gundersoni was described from two specimens found in the Big Hill Formation, which was likely a shallow lagoonal site connected to the ocean. Uniquely, this species has an elongated shovel-like prosoma with recurved posterior spines, as opposed to the more conventional form of the others. Alongside this, the holotype specimen also preserves a U-shaped structure interpreted as the ovaries, with pale spheres preserved within interpreted as eggs. This further suggests that this L. gundersoni specimen was an adult.

== See also ==
- 2005 in paleontology
- 2008 in paleontology
- 2022 in arthropod paleontology
- 2025 in arthropod paleontology
- List of xiphosurans
