= Quasillites =

Quasillites Temporal range: Middle Devonian to Lower Carboniferous 388.1–342.8 Ma

Scientific classification
- Domain: Eukaryota
- Kingdom: Animalia
- Phylum: Arthropoda
- Class: Ostracoda
- Order: Platycopida
- Family: †Quasillitidae
- Genus: †Quasillites; Coryell & Malkin, 1936

Species
- Quasillites angulatus; Quasillites fromelennensis; Quasillites lobatus (Schwartz & Oriel); Quasillites obliquus (Coryell & Malkin, 1936); Quasillites subobliquus

Extinct genus of seed shrimps

Quasillites is a fossil genus of ostracod from the Devonian and Carboniferous Periods.

== Description ==
Quasillites is distinguished from other ostracodes by the presence of a "medial spot" on each valve. The surface of each valve is covered in longitudinal, bifurcating ridges, which curve and resemble a finger print. The ribs and spines on the carapace are in front of the posterior margin, and are similar to those of other ostracods such as Bufina, Parabufina, and Healdia. In fact, this comparison can also be drawn for all Quasillitids to other Healdiids. The muscle scars on each valve is circular in shape, and some specimens have smaller secondary scars.

== Distribution ==
Devonian examples of Quasillites, such as Q. lobatus, Q. obliquus, Q. subobliquus, and Q. angulatus, are known from shales and claystones in northern New York, Eastern Ohio, central Pennsylvania. Other species such as Q. fromelennensis and a second informal species can also be found in Limestones of northern France, near the city of Calais. This genus has also been found in the Lower Carboniferous edge of the Illinois Basin; in central Indiana.
