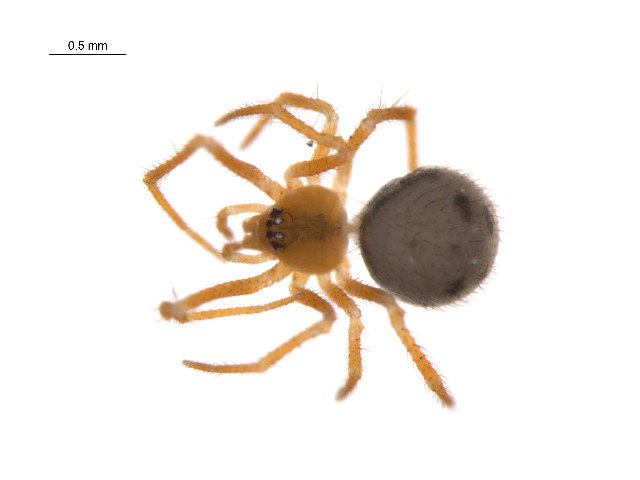
- T. camano, female
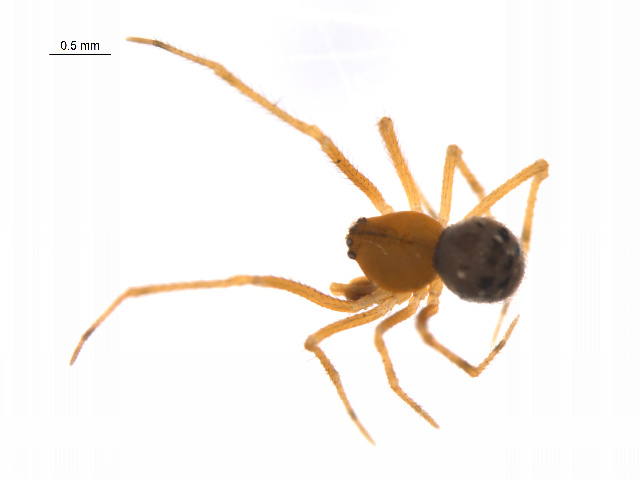
- T. camano, male

Scientific classification
- Domain: Eukaryota
- Kingdom: Animalia
- Phylum: Arthropoda
- Subphylum: Chelicerata
- Class: Arachnida
- Order: Araneae
- Infraorder: Araneomorphae
- Family: Theridiidae
- Genus: Thymoites
- Species: T. camano

Binomial name
- Thymoites camano (Levi, 1957)

= Thymoites camano =

Species of spider

Thymoites camano is a species of cobweb spider in the family Theridiidae. It is found in the United States.
