= Krausella =

Scientific classification
- Kingdom: Animalia
- Phylum: Arthropoda
- Clade: Pancrustacea
- Class: Ostracoda
- Order: Platycopida
- Suborder: †Metacopina
- Family: †Krausellidae; Berdan, 1961
- Genus: †Krausella; Ulrich, 1894

Extinct genus of crustaceans

Krausella is an extinct genus of ostracods. It is the sole genus in family Krausellidae.

It includes two species:

- †Krausella minuta (Harris, 1957) Copeland, 1974
- †Krausella spinosa (Harris, 1957) Copeland, 1965
