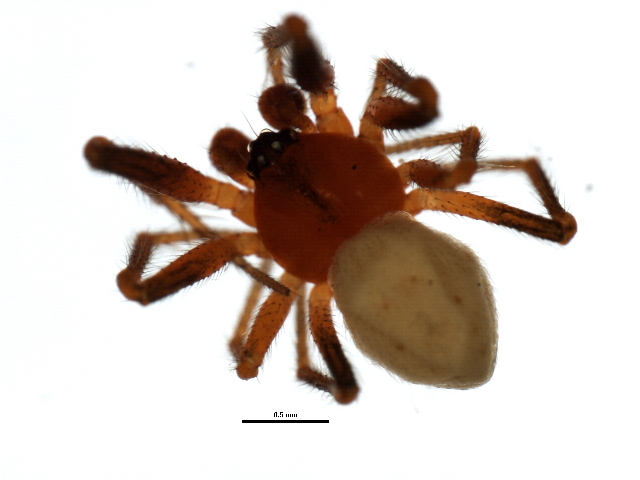
- T. unimaculatus, male
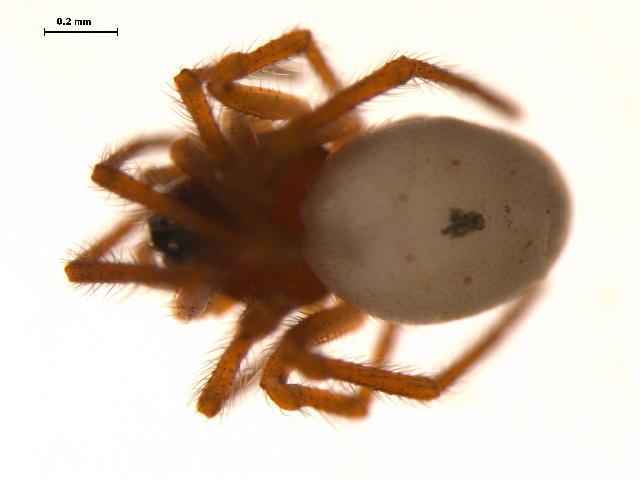
- T. unimaculatus, female

Scientific classification
- Domain: Eukaryota
- Kingdom: Animalia
- Phylum: Arthropoda
- Subphylum: Chelicerata
- Class: Arachnida
- Order: Araneae
- Infraorder: Araneomorphae
- Family: Theridiidae
- Genus: Thymoites
- Species: T. unimaculatus

Binomial name
- Thymoites unimaculatus (Emerton, 1882)

= Thymoites unimaculatus =

Species of spider

Thymoites unimaculatus is a species of cobweb spider in the family Theridiidae. It is found in the United States and Canada.
