= Punciidae =

Scientific classification
- Kingdom: Animalia
- Phylum: Arthropoda
- Clade: Pancrustacea
- Class: Ostracoda
- Order: Palaeocopida
- Superfamily: Puncioidea
- Family: Punciidae; Hornibrook, 1949

Family of crustaceans

Punciidae is the only surviving family in the ostracod order Palaeocopida. Of the three known genera, Manawa is eyeless. No information available if Promanawa and Puncia have eyes or not.

Genera:

- Manawa Hornibrook, 1949
- Promanawa McKenzie & Neil, 1983
- Puncia Hornibrook, 1949
