= Callistocythere =

Scientific classification
- Domain: Eukaryota
- Kingdom: Animalia
- Phylum: Arthropoda
- Class: Ostracoda
- Order: Podocopida
- Family: Leptocytheridae
- Genus: Callistocythere; Ruggieri, 1953

Species
- Several including: Callistocythere elegans (Mueller, 1894)

Synonyms
- Leptocythere (Callistocythere) Ruggieri, 1953

Genus of seed shrimps

Callistocythere is a genus of ostracods. Some species are known from the fossil record.
