= F. R. Cowper Reed =

British paleontologist

Frederick Richard Cowper Reed (27 June 1860 – 8 February 1946) was an English paleontologist and geologist who studied invertebrate fossils mainly in Britain but also travelled and wrote a book on the geology of the British Empire.

== Early life and education ==
Reed was born in London and studied at Harrow before going to Trinity College, Cambridge, where he passed with first class in the Natural Tripos part I (1891) and part 2 (1892). He won the Harkness scholarship for geology and paleontology as well as the Sedgwick Prize in 1901 for his work on the geological history of the East Yorkshire rivers. He received an Sc.D. in 1914. He worked at the Woodwardian Museum from 1892 initially as an assistant.

== Career ==
Reed spent most of the interwar period abroad, living in Southern Rhodesia from 1922 to 1933 where he helped to examine and identify remains of the Massospondylus and Coelophysis. From 1933 to early 1935 he lived in the Tanganyika Territory where he worked on the remains of the Kentrosaurus before returning home to Cambridgeshire that July.

Reed's work was on British paleontology with interests in Brachiopods and Trilobites. He also contributed to the Paleontologica India between 1906 and 1944. In 1921 he published a Geology of the British Empire based on travels through Africa, India and Canada.

== Publications ==
- Reed, F. R. C. (1917). XXVI.—The Ordovician and Silurian Brachiopoda of the Girvan District. Earth and Environmental Science Transactions of the Royal Society of Edinburgh, 51(4), 795-998. doi:10.1017/S0080456800011959
- Reed, F. R. C. (1935). LII.—Notes on the Neogene Faunas of Cyprus.—III. The Pliocene Faunas. Annals and Magazine of Natural History, 16(95), 489–524. doi:10.1080/00222933508655078
- Reed, F. R. C. (1935). I.—Notes on the neogene faunas of Cyprus.—II. Annals and Magazine of Natural History, 15(85), 1–37. https://doi.org/10.1080/00222933508654941
