= Guangyuanolimulus =

Guangyuanolimulus Temporal range: Changhsingian

Scientific classification
- Kingdom: Animalia
- Phylum: Arthropoda
- Subphylum: Chelicerata
- Order: Xiphosura
- Family: Limulidae
- Genus: †Guangyuanolimulus
- Species: †G. shangsiensis

Binomial name
- †Guangyuanolimulus shangsiensis Hu et al., 2022

Extinct genus of horseshoe crabs

Guangyuanolimulus is an extinct genus of limulid xiphosuran that lived during the Permian-Triassic extinction event.

== Distribution ==
Guangyuanolimulus shangsiensis fossils are known from South China.
