= Yulongsi Formation =

Geological formation in Qujing, Yunnan Province, China

The Yulongsi Formation is a palaeontological geological formation located at Qujing, in Yunnan Province of Southern China.

== Geology ==
The formation is of the Pridoli epoch of the Late Silurian period, during the Paleozoic Era.

== See also ==
- Chinese geological formations
- Paleontological sites of Asia
- List of fossil sites — (with link directory)
