= Leptocytheridae =

Scientific classification
- Domain: Eukaryota
- Kingdom: Animalia
- Phylum: Arthropoda
- Class: Ostracoda
- Order: Podocopida
- Family: Leptocytheridae; Hanai, 1957

Family of crustaceans

Leptocytheridae is a family of ostracods belonging to the order Podocopida.

== Genera ==
Genera:

- Aenigmocythere Bonaduce, Masoli & Pugliese, 1976
- Amnicythere Devoto, 1965
- Bisulcocythere Ayress & Swanson, 1991
- Callistocythere Ruggieri, 1953
