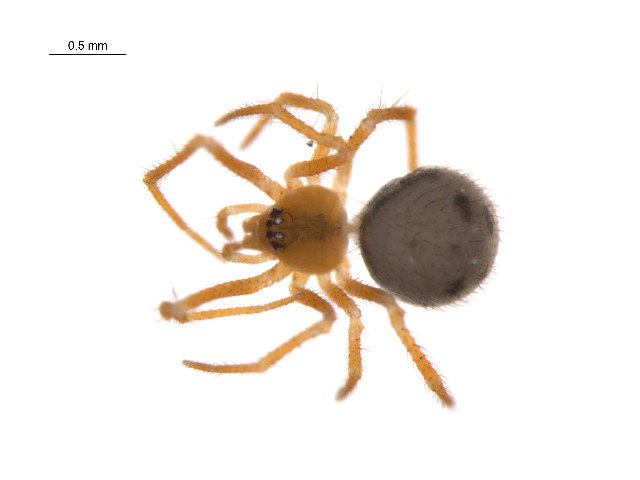
- T. camano, female
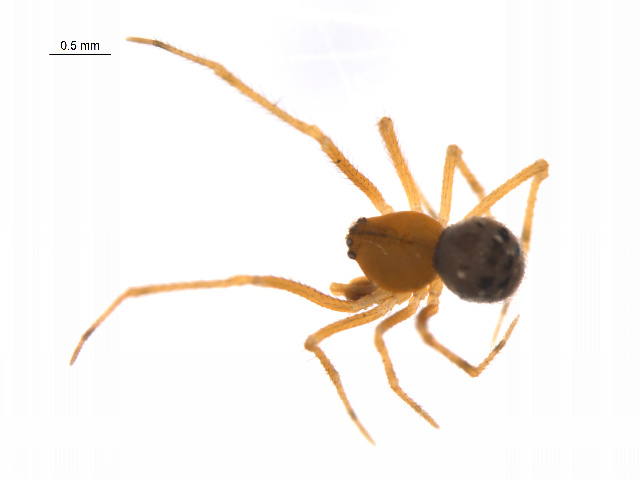
- T. camano, male

Scientific classification
- Kingdom: Animalia
- Phylum: Arthropoda
- Subphylum: Chelicerata
- Class: Arachnida
- Order: Araneae
- Infraorder: Araneomorphae
- Family: Theridiidae
- Genus: Thymoites; Keyserling, 1884

Type species
- T. crassipes Keyserling, 1884

Species
- 94, see text

Synonyms
- Brontosauriella Bristowe, 1938; Garricola Chamberlin, 1916; Hubba O. Pickard-Cambridge, 1897; Hypobares Simon, 1894; Paidisca Bishop & Crosby, 1926; Philto Simon, 1894; Spelobion Chamberlin & Ivie, 1938; Sphyrotinus Simon, 1894; Tholocco Archer, 1946; Thonastica Simon, 1909; Thymoella Bryant, 1948

= Thymoites =

Genus of spiders

Thymoites is a genus of comb-footed spiders that was first described by Eugen von Keyserling in 1884.

== Species ==
As of September 2019 it contains ninety-four species, found in Central America, Asia, South America, the Caribbean, Europe, Africa, North America, and on Greenland:

- T. aloitus Levi, 1964 – Brazil
- T. amprus Levi, 1964 – Panama
- T. anicus Levi, 1964 – Brazil
- T. anserma Levi, 1964 – Colombia
- T. banksi (Bryant, 1948) – Hispaniola
- T. bellissimus (L. Koch, 1879) – Scandinavia, Russia (Europe to Far East), China
- T. bocaina Rodrigues & Brescovit, 2015 – Brazil
- T. bogus (Levi, 1959) – Panama
- T. boneti (Levi, 1959) – Mexico
- T. boquete (Levi, 1959) – Mexico to Panama
- T. bradti (Levi, 1959) – Mexico
- T. camano (Levi, 1957) – USA
- T. camaqua Rodrigues & Brescovit, 2015 – Brazil
- T. cancellatus Mello-Leitão, 1943 – Argentina
- T. caracasanus (Simon, 1895) – Guatemala to Ecuador
- T. chiapensis (Levi, 1959) – Mexico
- T. chickeringi (Levi, 1959) – Panama
- T. chikunii (Yoshida, 1988) – Japan
- T. chopardi (Berland, 1920) – East Africa
- T. confraternus (Banks, 1898) – Mexico to Peru
- T. corus (Levi, 1959) – Mexico
- T. crassipes Keyserling, 1884 (type) – Peru
- T. cravilus Marques & Buckup, 1992 – Brazil
- T. cristal Rodrigues & Brescovit, 2015 – Brazil
- T. delicatulus (Levi, 1959) – Mexico to Venezuela
- T. ebus Levi, 1964 – Brazil
- T. elongatus Peng, Yin & Hu, 2008 – China
- T. expulsus (Gertsch & Mulaik, 1936) – USA, Mexico, Cuba, Jamaica
- T. gertrudae Müller & Heimer, 1990 – Colombia
- T. gibbithorax (Simon, 1894) – Venezuela
- T. guanicae (Petrunkevitch, 1930) – Mexico, Greater Antilles
- T. hupingensis Gan & Peng, 2015 – China
- T. ilhabela Rodrigues & Brescovit, 2015 – Brazil
- T. illudens (Gertsch & Mulaik, 1936) – USA to Colombia
- T. ilvan Levi, 1964 – Brazil
- T. incachaca Levi, 1964 – Bolivia
- T. indicatus (Banks, 1929) – Nicaragua to Panama
- T. ipiranga Levi, 1964 – Brazil
- T. iritus Levi, 1964 – Brazil
- T. levii Gruia, 1973 – Cuba
- T. lobifrons (Simon, 1894) – Venezuela
- T. lori Levi, 1964 – Peru
- T. luculentus (Simon, 1894) – Mexico to Panama, St. Vincent
- T. machu Levi, 1967 – Peru
- T. maderae (Gertsch & Archer, 1942) – USA to Panama
- T. maracayensis Levi, 1964 – Venezuela, Brazil
- T. marxi (Crosby, 1906) – USA, Mexico
- T. matachic (Levi, 1959) – Mexico
- T. melloleitaoni (Bristowe, 1938) – Brazil
- T. minero Roth, 1992 – USA
- T. minnesota Levi, 1964 – USA, Canada
- T. mirus Levi, 1964 – Brazil
- T. missionensis (Levi, 1957) – USA to Costa Rica
- T. murici Rodrigues & Brescovit, 2015 – Brazil
- T. nentwigi Yoshida, 1994 – Indonesia (Krakatau)
- T. nevada Müller & Heimer, 1990 – Colombia
- T. notabilis (Levi, 1959) – Panama
- T. oleatus (L. Koch, 1879) – Canada, Greenland, Russia (Europe to Far East)
- T. orilla (Levi, 1959) – Mexico
- T. pallidus (Emerton, 1913) – USA, Caribbean to Venezuela
- T. palo Levi, 1967 – Brazil
- T. peruanus (Keyserling, 1886) – Peru
- T. piarco (Levi, 1959) – Trinidad, Brazil
- T. pictipes (Banks, 1904) – USA
- T. pinheiral Rodrigues & Brescovit, 2015 – Brazil
- T. piratini Rodrigues & Brescovit, 2015 – Brazil
- T. praemollis (Simon, 1909) – Vietnam
- T. prolatus (Levi, 1959) – Panama
- T. promatensis Lise & Silva, 2009 – Brazil
- T. puer (Mello-Leitão, 1941) – Mexico, Brazil, Argentina
- T. ramon Levi, 1964 – Peru
- T. ramosus Gao & Li, 2014 – China
- T. rarus (Keyserling, 1886) – Brazil
- T. reservatus (Levi, 1959) – Panama
- T. sanctus (Chamberlin, 1916) – Peru
- T. sarasota (Levi, 1957) – USA
- T. sclerotis (Levi, 1957) – USA, Mexico
- T. simla (Levi, 1959) – Trinidad
- T. simplex (Bryant, 1940) – Cuba
- T. struthio (Simon, 1895) – Venezuela, Bolivia
- T. stylifrons (Simon, 1894) – Panama, Venezuela, St. Vincent
- T. subtilis (Simon, 1894) – Tanzania (Zanzibar)
- T. tabuleiro Rodrigues & Brescovit, 2015 – Brazil
- T. taiobeiras Rodrigues & Brescovit, 2015 – Brazil
- T. trisetaceus Peng, Yin & Griswold, 2008 – China
- T. ulleungensis (Paik, 1991) – Korea
- T. unimaculatus (Emerton, 1882) – USA, Canada
- T. unisignatus (Simon, 1894) – Colombia, Venezuela
- T. urubamba Levi, 1967 – Peru
- T. verus (Levi, 1959) – Mexico
- T. villarricaensis Levi, 1964 – Paraguay
- T. vivus (O. Pickard-Cambridge, 1899) – Costa Rica
- T. wangi Zhu, 1998 – China
- T. yaginumai Yoshida, 1995 – Japan

In synonymy:

- T. americanus (Simon, 1898, T from Theonoe) = Thymoites luculentus (Simon, 1894)
- T. amputatus (Keyserling, 1884) = Thymoites unimaculatus (Emerton, 1882)
- T. catalinae (Gertsch & Archer, 1942, T from Theridion) = Thymoites pictipes (Banks, 1904)
- T. cubanus (Bryant, 1940, T from Dipoena) = Thymoites pallidus (Emerton, 1913)
- T. deprus (Levi, 1959) = Thymoites confraternus (Banks, 1898)
- T. edinburgensis (Gertsch & Mulaik, 1936) = Thymoites pallidus (Emerton, 1913)
- T. hansi (Schenkel, 1950, T from Theridion) = Thymoites pictipes (Banks, 1904)
- T. imparatus (Bishop & Crosby, 1928, T from Theridion) = Thymoites unimaculatus (Emerton, 1882)
- T. insignis (O. Pickard-Cambridge, 1897) = Thymoites caracasanus (Simon, 1895)
- T. lascivulus (Keyserling, 1886, T from Dipoena) = Thymoites unimaculatus (Emerton, 1882)
- T. nicoleti (Keyserling, 1886, T from Theridion) = Thymoites unimaculatus (Emerton, 1882)
- T. paradisiacus (Gertsch & Archer, 1942, T from Theridion) = Thymoites unimaculatus (Emerton, 1882)
- T. petrensis (Sørensen, 1898, T from Theridion) = Thymoites oleatus (L. Koch, 1879)
- T. subimpressus (Zhu, 1998, T from Theridion) = Thymoites bellissimus (L. Koch, 1879)
- T. wallacei (Gertsch & Archer, 1942, T from Theridion) = Thymoites pallidus (Emerton, 1913)
