= Cytherellidae =

Cytherellidae Temporal range: Jurassic–Recent

Scientific classification
- Kingdom: Animalia
- Phylum: Arthropoda
- Clade: Pancrustacea
- Class: Ostracoda
- Order: Platycopida
- Suborder: Platycopina
- Family: Cytherellidae; G. O. Sars, 1866

Synonyms
- Cytherelloidae [lapsus]; †Spinososioellidae Kozur, 1991

Family of seed shrimps

Cytherellidae is the only living family of the ostracod order Platycopida. Eyes are absent. It contains 11 genera:

- †Abursus Loranger, 1954
- †Alveus Hamilton, 1942
- †Ankumia Veen, 1932
- Cytherella Jones, 1849
- Cytherelloidea Alexander, 1929
- †Geelongella McKenzie, Reyment & Reyment, 1991
- Grammcythella Swanson et al., 2005
- Inversacytherella Swanson et al., 2005
- Keijcyoidea Malz, 1981
- Platella Coryell & Fields, 1937
- †Staringia Veen, 1936
