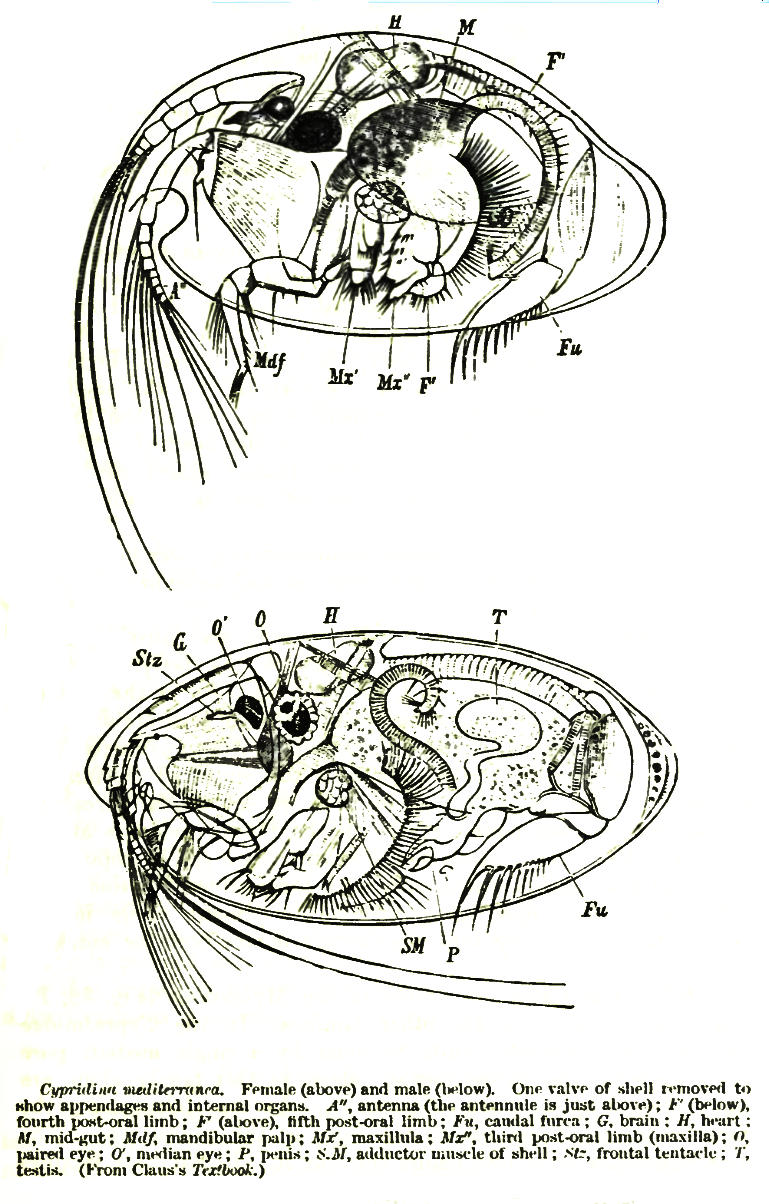

Scientific classification
- Domain: Eukaryota
- Kingdom: Animalia
- Phylum: Arthropoda
- Class: Ostracoda
- Subclass: Podocopa; G. O. Sars, 1866

Orders
- Palaeocopida Henningsmoen, 1953; Platycopida Sars, 1866; Podocopida Sars, 1866

= Podocopa =

Subclass of seed shrimps

The Podocopa are a subclass of ostracods. Members of the subclass Podocopa can be differentiated from the other subclass of ostracods (Myodocopa) by the morphology of the second antenna: the Podocopa have a relatively long endopod, whereas the Myodocopa have a relatively long exopod. The seventh limb of the Podocopa has a variety of forms or is absent, but is never an annulated worm-like limb (as seen in some Myodocopa).

== Taxonomy ==
The following orders and unplaced families are recognised in the subclass Podocopa:

- Order Palaeocopida
- Order Platycopida
    - Family †Cavellinidae Egorov, 1950
    - Family †Gotlandellidae Sarv, 1978
    - Family †Indivisiidae Egorov, 1954
    - Family †Kloedcytherellidae Kozur, 1985
    - Family †Kloedenellidae Ulrich & Bassler, 1908
    - Family †Kloedenellitinidae Abushik, 1990
    - Family †Knoxitidae Egorov, 1950
    - Family †Miltonellidae Sohn, 1950
    - Family †Monotiopleuridae Guber & Jaanusson, 1964
    - Family †Serenididae Rozhdesvenskaya, 1972
  - Suborder †Metacopina
    - Family †Bufinidae Sohn & Stover, 1961
    - Family †Healdiidae Harlton, 1933
    - Family †Krausellidae Berdan in Benson et al., 1961
    - Family †Quasillitidae Coryell & Malkin, 1936
    - Family †Ropolonellidae Coryell & Malkin, 1936
    - Family †Thlipsuridae Ulrich, 1894
  - Suborder Platycopina
    - Superfamily Cytherelloidea Sars, 1866
      - Family Cytherellidae Sars, 1866
    - Superfamily †Leperditelloidea Ulrich & Bassler, 1906
      - Family †Leperditellidae Ulrich & Bassler, 1906
      - Family †Leperditiidae Jones, 1856
      - Family †Primitiidae Ulrich & Bassler, 1923
- Order Podocopida
- Unplaced families
  - Family †Pachydomellidae Berdan & Sohn, 1961
  - Family †Rectellidae Neckaya, 1966
  - Family †Rectonariidae Gruendel, 1962
