= Palaeocopida =

Scientific classification
- Kingdom: Animalia
- Phylum: Arthropoda
- Clade: Pancrustacea
- Class: Ostracoda
- Subclass: Podocopa
- Order: Palaeocopida; Henningsmoen, 1953

Suborders
- See text

Synonyms
- Palaeocopa

Extinct order of seed shrimps

Palaeocopida is an order of ostracods in the subclass Podocopa. Most species in the suborder are extinct, and only the genera Manawa, Promanawa, and Puncia in the family Punciidae are extant. The members of the family live in high-energy shallow marine environments of New Zealand.

== Taxonomy ==
The following suborders are recognised in the order Palaeocopida:

- †Beyrichicopina
- †Binodicopina
- †Eridostracina
- Kirkbyocopina
- †Nodellocopina
- †Palaeocopina
