= List of prehistoric ostracod genera =

This list of prehistoric ostracods is an attempt to create a comprehensive listing of all genera from the fossil record that have ever been considered to be members of the Ostracoda, excluding purely vernacular terms. The list includes all commonly accepted genera, but also genera that are now considered invalid, doubtful (nomina dubia), or were not formally published (nomina nuda), as well as junior synonyms of more established names, and genera that are no longer considered ostracods.

== List ==
- Aaleniella
- Abditoloculina
- Abrobairdia
- Abrocythereis
- Absonocytheropteron
- Abursus
- Abyssobairdia
- Abyssocypris
- Abyssocythere
- Abyssocythereis
- Acanthobolbina
- Acanthocythere
- Acanthocythereis
- Acanthomeridion
- Acanthoscapha
- Acantonodella
- Acratia
- Acratina
- Acratinella
- Acravincula
- Acrocythere
- Acronotella
- Acrossula
- Actiangulata
- Actinochilina
- Actinocythereis
- Acuprisma
- Acuticythereis
- Acuticytheretta
- Acvocaria
- Adamczakia
- Adamczakites
- Adeditia
- Adelphobolbina
- Admirabilinella
- Aechmina
- Aechminaria
- Aechminella
- Aegyptiana
- Aetholicotoxotis
- Afranticythereis
- Afrocytheridea
- Agrenocythere
- Agulhasina
- Ahlintella
- Aikenicythere
- Airina
- Aitilia
- Ajchalina
- Akkermites
- Alakolites
- Alaskabolbina
- Alatacavellina
- Alatacythere
- Alataleberis
- Albrunnicola
- Algerina
- Allocythereis
- Alocopocythere
- Aloculatia
- Altaecypris
- Altha Neckaja, 1958 (non Walker, 1862: preoccupied) – see Neckajatia
- Aluta
- Alutella
- Alveolella
- Ambocythere
- Ambostracon
- Amerigobolbina
- Amicus
- Amphicostella
- Amphicythere
- Amphicytherura
- Amphikegelites
- Amphileberis
- Amphisella
- Amphissites
- Amphistegina
- Amphitoxotis
- Amphizona
- Ampletochilina
- Ampuloides
- Amygdalella
- Anabarochilina
- Anahuacia Grundel, 1972 (non Hoffmann, 1963: preoccupied)
- Anchistrocheles
- Anebocythereis
- Aneisohealdia
- Anfedatia
- Angliaecytheridea
- Anisochilina
- Anisocyamus
- Ankumia
- Anommatocyther
- Anomocytheridea
- Antiaechmia
- Antibythocypris
- Anticostiella
- Anticythereis
- Antischmidtella
- Antohipponicharion
- Aparchitella
- Aparchitellina
- Aparchites
- Aparchitocythere
- Apateloschizocythere
- Apatobolbina
- Apatochilina
- Apatocythere
- Aphelocythere
- Aphrikanecythere
- Aratrocypris
- Arcacythere
- Archeocosta
- Archeocuneocythere
- Archicythereis
- Arcuaria
- Arcyzona
- Ardennea
- Argenticytheretta
- Argilloecia
- Arikloedenia
- Aristaluta
- Aristozoe
- Arqoviella
- Arrazocypris
- Arsiriina
- Artifactella
- Aruduce
- Ascetoleberis
- Asciocythere
- Asturiella
- Asymmetricythere
- Atjehella
- Atlanticythere
- Atterdagia
- Aulacopsis
- Aulocytheridea
- Auriculatella
- Aurigerites
- Aurikirkbya
- Aurila
- Australicythere
- Australobollia
- Australoecia
- Australopsis
- Aversovalva
- Aviacypris
- Baffincythere
- Bairdia
- Bairdianella
- Bairdiocypris
- Bairdiohealdites
- Bairdiolites
- Bairdites
- Bairdoppilata
- Bajacythere
- Bajiella
- Bakunella
- Balantoides
- Ballardina
- Balowella
- Balticella
- Baltonotella
- Barrosina
- Barrychilina
- Barychilina
- Barymepton
- Baschkirina
- Bassleratia
- Basslerella
- Basslerites
- Batavocythere
- Bathycythere
- Bathypterocythereis
- Beatamoosina
- Beckerhealdia
- Beecherella
- Beecheroscapha
- Bekena
- Bellornatia
- Bennviaspis
- Bensonia
- Bensonocythere
- Berdanopis
- Berolinella
- Berounella
- Bertillonella
- Beyrichia
- Beyrichiana
- Beyrichiella
- Beyrichiopsis
- Beyrichona
- Biaurina
- Bichilina
- Bicornella
- Bicornellina
- Bicornucythere
- Bideirella
- Bilobatia
- Bingeria
- Binodella
- Binodina
- Birdsallella
- Bisacculus
- Bisphenella
- Bispinitia
- Bisulcocypris
- Bisulcoentomozoe
- Bivia
- Bodenia
- Bodeniella
- Bohemobolbina
- Bohlenatia
- Bolbibollia
- Bolbilithis
- Bolbina
- Bolbineossia
- Bolbiprimitia
- Bolbopisthia
- Bolbozoe
- Bolbozoella
- Boldella
- Bollia
- Bolliaphores
- Bonnemaia
- Bonneprimites
- Borcobolbina
- Borgerscottia
- Borodiella
- Borovitchella
- Bosquetia
- Bosquetina
- Botulobolbina
- Boucekites
- Boucia
- Brachycythere
- Brachycytheropteron
- Braderupia
- Bradleya
- Bradoria
- Brephocharieis
- Brevibolbina
- Brevidorsa
- Brevisulcina
- Briartina
- Bromidella
- Bronsteiniana
- Bubnoffiopsis
- Bucerella
- Bucerobolbina
- Budnianella
- Buekkella
- Bufanchiste
- Bufina
- Bulbosclerites
- Bulbosulculus
- Bullaeferum
- Bullaluta
- Bullatella
- Buntonia
- Buregia
- Byrsolopsina
- Bythoceratina
- Bythocypris
- Bythocyproidea
- Bythocythere
- Bythocytheromorpha
- Calcaribeyrichia
- Callicythere
- Callistocythere
- Calocaria
- Cambraechmina
- Cambria
- Camdenidea
- Camptocythere
- Campylocythere
- Caprabolbina
- Capsacythere
- Carboprimita
- Cardiniferella
- Cardobairdia
- Caribbella
- Carinaknightina
- Carinobairdia
- Carinobolbina
- Carinocythereis
- Carinokloedenia
- Carnarvonia
- Carubaknightina
- Casterocythere
- Catacoraites
- Cativella
- Caudites
- Cavellina
- Cavhithis
- Cavopleura
- Cavussurella
- Caytonidea
- Cedocamia
- Celechovites
- Centrocythere
- Ceratobairdia
- Ceratobolbina
- Ceratocratia
- Ceratocypris
- Ceratoleperditia
- Ceratopsis
- Cerninella
- Cershiites
- Chamishaella
- Changshabaella
- Changyangnia
- Chapmanicythereis
- Chapmanites
- Charitoxotis
- Checontonomus
- Chejudocythere
- Cherskiella
- Chesterella
- Chevroleperditia
- Chilobolbina
- Chironiptrum
- Chrysocythere
- Cincinnaticoncha
- Circulina
- Cistacythereis
- Citrella
- Cladarocythere
- Clavofabella
- Clavofabellina
- Cleithranchiste
- Cletocythereis
- Climacoidea
- Clinocythere
- Clintiella
- Clithrocytheridea
- Cluthia
- Cnestocythere
- Coelochilina
- Coeloenellina
- Coelonella
- Colacchilina
- Collibolbina
- Collisboris
- Combinivalvula
- Comptaluta
- Conbathella
- Concavhithis
- Conchoecia
- Conchoprimitella
- Conchoprimites
- Conchoprimitia
- Condomyra
- Condracypris
- Coniferina
- Consonopsis
- Conspicillum
- Cooperatia
- Cooperuna
- Copelandella
- Copelandia
- Copytus
- Coquimba
- Cornicythereis
- Cornigella
- Cornikloedenia
- Cornucoquimba
- Cornutobairdia
- Coronakirkbya
- Coryellina
- Coryellites
- Costa
- Costaegera
- Costatia
- Costaveenia
- Costokloedenia
- Covracythere
- Craspedobolbina
- Craspedographylus
- Craspedopyxion
- Crasquinia Kammerer, 2006
- Crassacythere
- Craterellina
- Crenabolina
- Crenaleya
- Crescenticythere
- Crescentilla
- Cretaceratina
- Cribroconcha
- Cristaeleberis
- Crucicornina
- Cryptobairdia
- Cryptoglytopleura
- Cryptophyllus
- Ctenobolbina
- Ctenobolbinella
- Ctenoloculina
- Ctenonotella
- Cubitosulcus
- Cubtosulcus
- Cuneoceratina
- Cuneocythere
- Curfsina
- Cushmanidea
- Cyamocytheridea
- Cyathus
- Cyclolberis
- Cymabolbina
- Cyprella
- Cyprideis
- Cypridella
- Cypridellina
- Cypridina
- Cypridinella
- Cypridopsis
- Cyprosina
- Cyprosis
- Cyrtocyprus
- Cystacythereis
- Cystomatochilina
- Cytheralison
- Cythere
- Cythereis
- Cytherella
- Cytherellina
- Cytherelloidea
- Cytheretta
- Cytheridea
- Cytheridella
- Cytherissinella
- Cytherois
- Cytheroma
- Cytheromorpha
- Cytheropterina
- Cytheropteron
- Cytherura
- Dabashanella
- Dahaiella
- Dahomeya
- Daleiella
- Dalelina
- Dallonella
- Damaoella
- Damiriella
- Damonella
- Dawania
- Decorella
- Deefgella
- Deloia
- Delosia
- Dentokrithe
- Dentoparaparchites
- Dettermania
- Dibolbina
- Dibolbopisthia
- Diceratobolbina
- Dicerobairdia
- Dicranella
- Dicrorygma
- Dictocythere
- Dictyotoxotis
- Diebelina
- Dielymella
- Digmocythere
- Dihogmochilina
- Dilobella
- Diogmopteron
- Diplopsis
- Discoidella
- Disculcina
- Disopontocypris
- Disparigonya
- Distobolbina
- Disulcinoides
- Diura
- Dizygopleura
- Dogoriella
- Dolborella
- Dolichoscapha
- Dolichoscaphoides
- Dolocythere
- Dolocytheridea
- Domaszevicella
- Dominina
- Donellina
- Donmacythere
- Doraclatum
- Doratocythere
- Dordoniella
- Dorispina
- Dornbuschia
- Drepanella
- Drepanellina
- Duibianella
- Dulkumella
- Dumontina
- Duplexibollia
- Duplicristatia
- Duringia
- Dutoitella
- Easchmidtella
- Echinocythereis
- Echinoprimitia
- Ectoprimitia
- Ectoprimitioides
- Edenopsis
- Editia
- Effeminatopleura
- Egenacythere
- Egorovella
- Egorovia
- Egorovitina
- Egorvellina
- Ehlersia
- Eisobairdia
- Ektyphocythere
- Elenamarginia
- Ellesmerina
- Ellipsella
- Elliptocyprites
- Elofsonella
- Elofsonia
- Elpezoe
- Elpinella
- Embryotoxotis
- Emphasia
- Endolophia Kesling, 1954 (non Hampson, 1899: preoccupied)
- Entomoconchus
- Entomoprimitia
- Entomozoe
- Entoprimitia
- Eoaquapulex
- Eobromidella
- Eobuntonia
- Eochilina
- Eoconchoecia
- Eocypridina
- Eocytherella
- Eocytheridea
- Eocytheropteron
- Eographiodactylus
- Eohollina
- Eokloedenia
- Eoleperditia
- Eolomatella
- Eomoelleritia
- Eopaijenborchella
- Eoparaparchites
- Eorotundracythere
- Eostephanella
- Epactridion
- Equicastanea
- Eremos
- Eridoconcha
- Eriella
- Eripleura
- Ertangia
- Escharacytheridea
- Estonaceratella
- Estoniops
- Eucraterellina
- Eucythere
- Eucytherura
- Eudecacythere
- Euglyphella
- Eukloedenella
- Euprimites
- Euprimitia
- Eurekabolbina
- Eurocyamus
- Europisthia
- Eurychilina
- Euryitycythere
- Eustephanella
- Euthlipsurella
- Evlanella
- Evlanovia
- Exophthalmocythere
- Extrania
- Fabalicypris
- Fabanella
- Falites
- Fallaticella
- Falsipollex
- Falsocythere
- Falunia
- Famenella
- Fastigastocythere
- Faveolebris
- Favulella
- Fellerites
- Femerensia
- Fengtaiella
- Fidelitella
- Finmarchinella
- Fiorella
- Fissocrinocythere
- Fissocythere
- Flabellimutilis
- Flaccivelum
- Flemingia
- Flemingopsis
- Flexuocythere
- Flexus
- Foramenella
- Forbescythere
- Fossirichterina
- Foveaprimitella
- Foveoleberis
- Frambocythere
- Franklinella
- Frostiella
- Fueloepicythere
- Fuhrbergiella
- Fuscinites
- Fuscinullina
- Galeopsis
- Galliaecytheridea
- Gammacythere
- Gannibeyrichia
- Garniella
- Garnuella
- Gebeckeria
- Geffenina
- Geffenites
- Geisina
- Gelidicella
- Gellensia
- Gemmanella
- Gerbeckites
- Gerubiella
- Gesoriacula
- Giandites
- Gibba
- Gibberella
- Gibberlebeis
- Gillatia
- Ginella
- Ginginella
- Gipsella
- Glabellacythere
- Gladioscutum
- Glenocythere
- Glezeria
- Glimmatobolbina
- Glorianella
- Glossomorphites
- Glymmatobolbina
- Glyptocythere
- Glyptogatocythere
- Glyptolichvinella
- Glyptopleura
- Glyptopleurella
- Glyptopleurina
- Glyptopleuroides
- Golcocythere
- Golcondella
- Gongylostonyx
- Gotlandella
- Gotula
- Gracquina
- Gramannella
- Gramannicythere
- Gramella
- Grammolomatella
- Graphiadactyllis
- Gravia
- Grekoffiana
- Grinioneis
- Gruendelella
- Gruendelicythere
- Grundelella
- Gryphiswaldensia
- Guangdongella
- Guangyuanella
- Guberites
- Gubkiniella
- Guerichiella
- Gujaratella
- Gunneropsis
- Gyrgathella
- Gyrocythere
- Habrocythere
- Hallatia
- Halliella
- Hameaschmidtella
- Hammatocythere
- Hanaiborchella
- Hanaiceratina
- Hanaicythere
- Hanaites
- Hanchiangella
- Haplobolbina
- Haplocytheridea
- Haploprimitia
- Harginisulcus
- Harpabollia
- Harperopsis
- Hastacypris
- Hastatellina
- Hatangeus
- Haughtonileberis
- Haworthina
- Hazelina
- Healdia
- Healdiacypris
- Healdianella
- Healdioides
- Hebellum
- Hechticythere
- Heinia
- Heliocythere
- Hellebardia
- Hemeaschnidtella
- Hemiaechminoides
- Hemicyprideis
- Hemicythere
- Hemicytheria
- Hemicytheridea
- Hemicytherura
- Hemikrithe
- Hemingwayella
- Hemiparacytheridea
- Hemsiella
- Henningsmoenia
- Henryhowella
- Heptaloculites
- Hercynobolbina
- Hercynocythere
- Hermanites
- Herrigocyther
- Herrmannina
- Hesperidella
- Hesslandella
- Hesslandites
- Hesslandona
- Heterma
- Heterochilina
- Heterocyprideis
- Heterocythereis
- Hiatobairdia
- Hibbardia
- Hillmeria
- Hiltermannicythere
- Hintziella
- Hipponicharion
- Hippula
- Hirschmannia
- Hirsutocythere
- Histina
- Hithis
- Hogmochilina
- Holcopocythere
- Hollina
- Hollinella
- Holtedahlites
- Homeoceratopsis
- Homeokiesowia
- Hornibrookella
- Horrificiella
- Houlongdongella
- Hourqia
- Howeina
- Huanghuaella
- Huantraiconella
- Huckea
- Hulingsina
- Hungarella
- Hungarogeisina
- Huntonella
- Hupehella
- Hutsonia
- Huttoniella
- Hyphasmaphora
- Hypotetragona
- Hyrsinobolbina
- Hystricocythere
- Iatella
- Idiocythere
- Illativella
- Ilmenoindivisia
- Imangdites
- Imhotepia
- Incisurella
- Incongruellina
- Indiana
- Indivisia
- Indota
- Iniella
- Inisylthere
- Ionicythere
- Iraqicythereis
- Ishmiella
- Isobuntonia
- Isobythocypris
- Isochilina
- Isocythereis
- Isohabrocythere
- Ispharaella
- Italogeisina
- Ivaria
- Ivia
- Jaanussonia
- Jagatiella
- Jakutobolbina
- Jamischjewskya
- Janusella
- Jatella
- Javanella
- Javatius
- Jeanlouisella
- Jefina
- Jenningsina
- Jingguella
- Jixinglingella
- Jonesella
- Jonesia
- Jonesina
- Jonesites
- Jordanites
- Judahella
- Jugosocythereis
- Junctusina
- Juvenix
- Kaesleria
- Kalugia
- Kalyptovalva
- Kamajcythereis
- Kangarina
- Karinadomella
- Karinutatia
- Karlsteinella
- Karsteneis
- Kasovobolbina
- Kassinina
- Katatona
- Kayatia
- Kayina
- Kefiella
- Kegelites
- Keijella
- Keijicythere
- Kellettina
- Kemeroviana
- Keslingiella
- Kiaeritia
- Kielciella
- Kiesowia
- Kikliocythere
- Kindlella
- Kingmaina
- Kinkelinella
- Kinnekullea
- Kirkbya
- Kirkbyella
- Kirkbyellina
- Kirtonella
- Kitabella
- Klieana
- Klimphores
- Klinglerella
- Kloedcytherella
- Kloedenella
- Kloedenellitina
- Kloedenia
- Klonkina
- Knightina
- Knoxiella
- Knoxina
- Knoxites
- Kobayashiina
- Kolednikella
- Kolmodinia
- Komaroiella
- Konicekion
- Koscoviellina
- Kozlowskiella
- Kraftia
- Krausella
- Krausellina
- Krithe
- Kroemmelbeinella
- Kroemmelbeinia
- Kummerowia
- Kunmingella
- Kunyangella
- Kuresaaria
- Kuzminaella
- Kyamodes
- Kyphomopisthia
- Labrosavelum
- Laccochilina
- Laccoprimitia
- Lamellacratia
- Langdaia
- Langtonia
- Lankacythere
- Lapazites
- Lardeuxella
- Latebina
- Laterophores
- Ledahia
- Legitimocythere
- Leguminocythereis
- Leiocyamus
- Leioprimitia
- Lembitites
- Lembitsarvella
- Lenatella
- Leniocythere
- Lennukella
- Leperditella
- Leperditelloides
- Leperditia
- Leptobolbina
- Leptocythere
- Leptoprimitia
- Leshanella
- Lesleya
- Leviella
- Levisulculus
- Liagnshanella
- Liasina
- Liasopteron
- Libumella
- Lichvinia
- Ligerina
- Limatia
- Limbinaria
- Limbinariella
- Limburgina
- Lindisfarnia
- Lingulibolina
- Linsayella
- Liujingnia
- Lixouria
- Ljubimovella
- Loculibairdia
- Loculibolbina
- Loculicytheretta
- Loculocavata
- Lokius
- Lomatobolbina
- Lomatopisthia
- Londinia
- Longidorsa
- Longiscula
- Longyuanella
- Looneyella
- Lophoctenella
- Lophocythere
- Lophodentina
- Lophokloedenia
- Loutriella
- Louza
- Loxoconcha
- Loxoconchella
- Loxocorniculum
- Loxocythere
- Lublinella
- Lubrzankiella
- Luciter
- Ludvigsenites
- Luniprisma
- Lutkevichinella
- Luvula
- Lycopterocypris
- Lysogorella
- Macrocyprina
- Macrocypris
- Macrocyproides
- Macrodentina
- Macronotella
- Macrosarisa
- Macrypsilon
- Maghrebeis
- Maizassionis
- Majiashanella
- Majungaella
- Malguzaria
- Malnina
- Malongella
- Malzella
- Mammoides
- Mandawacythere
- Mandelstamia
- Mandocythere
- Mannosocmia
- Mantelliana
- Maratia
- Marginia
- Marginisulcus
- Marginohealdia
- Marginotimorites
- Margniohealdia
- Margobairdia
- Margoplanitia
- Marquezina
- Marslatourella
- Martinicythere
- Martinssonopsis
- Martinssonozona
- Masloviella
- Mastigobolbina
- Maternella
- Matronella
- Mauritsina
- Mauryella
- Mayburya
- Medianella
- Mediocytherideis
- Megommatocythere
- Mehesella
- Meishucunella
- Melanchlenia
- Memoria
- Mennerella
- Menoeidina
- Merocythere
- Mesomphalus
- Messinella
- Metacypris
- Metacytheropteron
- Microaechmina
- Microcheilinella
- Microchilina
- Microcosmia
- Microcythere
- Microcytherura
- Microparaparchites
- Micropneumatocythere
- Microxestolebris
- Miehlkella
- Milanovskya
- Milleratia
- Miltonella
- Miocytheridea
- Mirabairdia
- Miraculum
- Miracythere
- Mochella
- Moeckowia
- Moelleritia
- Moierina
- Mojczella
- Monasterium
- Monoceratella
- Monoceratina
- Mononotella
- Monotiopleura
- Monsmirabilia
- Moorea
- Moorites
- Moosina
- Morkhovenia
- Morkhovenicythereis
- Mosaeleberis
- Mostlerella
- Movchovitschia
- Muellerina
- Munseyella
- Murrayina
- Murthya
- Murtiella
- Mutilus
- Myomphalis
- Naevhithis
- Nagyella
- Namaia
- Nanacythere
- Nanchengella
- Nanopsis
- Nanurocythereis
- Navarracythere
- Navicularina
- Naviculina
- Neckajatia Schallreuter, 1974
- Neckajella
- Necrateria
- Nehdentomis
- Nemoceratina
- Nemuniella
- Neoamphissites
- Neoaparchites
- Neobairdia
- Neoberounella
- Neobeyrichia
- Neocaudites
- Neochilina
- Neocraterellina
- Neocyprideis
- Neocythere
- Neocytheretta
- Neocytherideis
- Neodrepanella
- Neokloedenella
- Neokunmingella
- Neomonoceratina
- Neonesidea
- Neonyhamnella
- Neooctonaria
- Neophrecythere
- Neoprimitiella
- Neoschmidtella
- Neothlipsura
- Neotsitrella
- Neoulrichia
- Neoveenia
- Nephokirkos
- Netrocytheridea
- Netschajewiana
- Netzkaina
- Nevadabolbina
- Newsomites
- Nezamyslia
- Nicolina
- Nigeria
- Nigeroloxoconcha
- Nikitinella
- Nionella
- Nobilitella
- Nodambichilina
- Nodella
- Nodibeyrichia
- Nodobairdia
- Nodophthalmocythere
- Nonsukozona
- Nonurocythereis
- Nophrecythere
- Normanicythere
- Norochilina
- Notocythere
- Notoscapha
- Novakina
- Noviportia
- Novobolbina
- Novocypris
- Novogladites
- Nucleolina
- Nudista
- Nuguschia
- Nyhamnella
- Obisafitella
- Obliquisylthis
- Oblitacythereis
- Obotrita
- Occlusacythereis
- Occulocytheropteron
- Occultocythereis
- Ochesaarina
- Ochesaarina
- Ochescapha
- Ockerella
- Octobolbina
- Octonaria
- Octonariellina
- Octosylthere
- Oecematobolbina
- Oejlemyra
- Oepikaluta
- Oepikella
- Oepikium
- Oertliella
- Ogmoconcha
- Ogmoconchella
- Ogmoopsis
- Ojlemyra
- Olbia
- Oliganisus
- Oligocythereis
- Olimfalunia
- Ommatokrithe
- Oncotechmonus
- Ophiosema
- Opikatia
- Opimocythere
- Opisthoplax
- Orbitolina
- Orcofabella
- Ordoniya
- Ordovicia
- Ordovizona
- Orechina
- Orientalina
- Orionina
- Orlovicavina
- Ornatoleberis
- Orthobairdia
- Orthocypris
- Orthonaria
- Orthonotacythere
- Osmotoxotis
- Otocythere
- Otraczetia
- Ouachitaia
- Ovaluta
- Ovatoquasillites
- Ovocytheridea
- Ovornina
- Pacambocythere
- Pachycaudites
- Pachydomella
- Pachydomelloides
- Paegnium
- Paenaequina
- Paenula
- Paijenborchella
- Paijenborchellina
- Palaeocytheridea
- Palaeocytheridella
- Palaeophilomedes
- Paleocosta
- Paleocythere
- Paleomonsmirabilia
- Palmenella
- Palmoconcha
- Panderia
- Papillatabairdia
- Parabairdiacypris
- Parabairdianella
- Paraberounella
- Parabolbina
- Parabouchekius
- Parabythocythere
- Paracaudites
- Paracavellina
- Paracosta
- Paractenoloculina
- Paracyprideis
- Paracyprinotus
- Paracypris
- Paracythere
- Paracythereis
- Paracytheretta
- Paracytheridea
- Paracytherois
- Paracytheroma
- Paracytheromorpha
- Paracytheropteron
- Paradoxostoma
- Paraechmina
- Paraeoleperditia
- Paraeucypris
- Paraexophthalmocythere
- Paraglyptobairdia
- Paraglyptopleura
- Paragrenocythere
- Parahealdia
- Parahemingwayella
- Parahippa
- Parahollinella
- Parajonesites
- Parakozlowskiella
- Parakrithe
- Parakrithella
- Parakunmingella
- Paraleperditia
- Paramacrocypris
- Paramicrocheilinella
- Paramoelleritia
- Paramunseyella
- Paranesidea
- Paranotacythere
- Paranoviportia
- Paraoliganisus
- Paraparchitella
- Paraparchites
- Paraphaseolella
- Paraplatyrhomboides
- Parapribylites
- Paraprimitia
- Parapyxion
- Parariscus
- Paraschizocythere
- Paraschmidtella
- Paraschuleridea
- Parashergoldopsis
- Parashivaella
- Parasleia
- Paraspinobairdia
- Parasterbergella
- Parataxodonta
- Paratriebelina
- Paratsunyiella
- Paraungerella
- Parenthatia
- Pariceratina
- Pariconchoprimitia
- Parphores
- Parulrichia
- Parvacythereis
- Parvikirbya
- Patagonacythere
- Patellacythere
- Pauline
- Pavloviella
- Pectidolon
- Pectocythere
- Pedicythere
- Pedomphalella
- Pelecocythere
- Pellucistoma
- Peloriops
- Pelycobolbina
- Pennyella
- Pentagona
- Pentagonochilina
- Peratocytheridea
- Perissocytheridea
- Permopolycope
- Permoyoungiella
- Perprimitia
- Perspicillum
- Peteraurila
- Petrisigmoopsis
- Phacorhabdotus
- Phalcocythere
- Phanassymetria
- Phaseolella
- Phasoia
- Philomedes
- Philoneptunus
- Phlyctenophora
- Phlyctiscapha
- Phlyctocythere
- Phodeucythere
- Phreatura
- Phthanoloxoconcha
- Phyrocythere
- Physalidopisthia
- Physcocalyptra
- Physocythere
- Pichottia
- Pilla
- Pinnatulites
- Pinnoxypridea
- Piretella
- Piretia
- Piretopsis
- Pistocythereis
- Placidea
- Plagionephrodes
- Planileberis
- Planiprimites
- Planoria
- Plantella
- Planusella
- Platella
- Platybolbina
- Platychilella
- Platycythere
- Platycythereis
- Platyleberis
- Platylophocythere
- Platyrhomboides
- Plavskella
- Plesidielymella
- Plethobolbina
- Pleurifera
- Pleurocythere
- Pleurodella
- Pneumatocythere
- Podolibolbina
- Pokornyella
- Polenovula
- Poloniella
- Polyceratella
- Polycope
- Polydentina
- Polyphyma
- Polytylites
- Polyzygia
- Ponderodictya
- Poniklacella
- Pontocyprella
- Pontocypris
- Pontocythere
- Porkornya
- Porkornyopsis
- Posacythere
- Poseidonamicus
- Posneratina
- Posnerina
- Posteroprotocythere
- Praebythoceratina
- Praelobobairdia
- Praemacrocypris
- Praemunseyella
- Praephacorhabdotus
- Praepilatina
- Praeschuleridea
- Praezabythocypris
- Predarwinula
- Premunseyella
- Pribylina
- Pribylites
- Primitia
- Primitiella
- Primitiopsella
- Primitiopsis
- Primitivothilipsurella
- Proabyssocypris
- Processobairdia
- Procythereis
- Procytherettina
- Procytheridea
- Procytherideis
- Procytheropteron
- Procytherura
- Proeditia
- Profundobythere
- Progoncythere
- Progonoidea
- Proparaparchites
- Propontocypris
- Prorectella
- Prosumia
- Protallinnella
- Proteoconcha
- Protoacanthcythere
- Protoargilloecia
- Protobuntonia
- Protocythere
- Protocytheretta
- Protojonesia
- Pseudacantoscapha
- Pseudoaparchites
- Pseudoaurila
- Pseudobeyrichia
- Pseudobeyrichiopsis
- Pseudobollia
- Pseudobythocypris
- Pseudobythocythere
- Pseudocavellina
- Pseudoceratina
- Pseudocyproides
- Pseudocythere
- Pseudocytheretta
- Pseudocytheridea
- Pseudocytheromorpha
- Pseudocytherura
- Pseudoentomozoe
- Pseudohealdia
- Pseudohippula
- Pseudohustonia
- Pseudokiesowia
- Pseudokrithe
- Pseudokunmingella
- Pseudoleperditia
- Pseudomacrocypris
- Pseudomonoceratina
- Pseudomyomphalus
- Pseudonodella
- Pseudonodellina
- Pseudoparaparchites
- Pseudoperissocytheridea
- Pseudophanasymmetria
- Pseudoprimitiella
- Pseudoprotocythere
- Pseudopsammocythere
- Pseudorakverella
- Pseudorayella
- Pseudostrepula
- Pseudotallinnella
- Pseudozygobolbina
- Pseudulrichia
- Psilokirkbyella
- Pteroleperditia
- Pterygocythere
- Pterygocythereis
- Ptychobairdia
- Pullvillites
- Pulviella
- Pulvillites
- Punctaparchites
- Punctomosea
- Punctoschmidtella
- Puriana
- Puricytheretta
- Pustulobairdia
- Pygoconcha
- Pyrocytheridea
- Pyxion
- Pyxiprimitia
- Qingjiania
- Quadracythere
- Quadricollina
- Quadridigitalis
- Quadrijugator
- Quadrilobella
- Quadritia
- Quasibuntonia
- Quasiglyptopleura
- Quasillites
- Rabienella
- Rabienites
- Racvetina
- Radimella
- Raimbautina
- Rakverella
- Ranapeltis
- Ranicella
- Raymondatia
- Raymoorea
- Rayneria
- Rectalloides
- Rectella
- Rectobairdia
- Rectobuntonia
- Rectocypris
- Rectocythere
- Rectonaria
- Rectoplacera
- Rectospinella
- Rectotrachyleberis
- Refrathella
- Reginacypris
- Reginea
- Regubea
- Rehacythereis
- Reigiopsis
- Renibeyrichia
- Renngartenella
- Reticestus
- Reticulina
- Reticulocambria
- Reticulochilina
- Reticulocosta
- Retisacculus
- Reubenella
- Reuentalina
- Reussicythere
- Reversocypris
- Reversoparaparchites
- Revisylthere
- Reviya
- Reymenticosta
- Rhadinocythere
- Rhocobairdia
- Rhombina
- Rhombocythere
- Rhomboentomozoe
- Rhysomagis
- Rhytiobeyrichia
- Richina
- Richteria
- Richterina
- Rigidella
- Rimabollia
- Rimacytheropteron
- Rishona
- Ritatia
- Rivillina
- Robertsonites
- Robsoniella
- Ropolonellus
- Rostrocytheridea
- Rothella
- Rothellina
- Rotundracythere
- Roundyella
- Rozdestvenskayites
- Rozmaniella
- Rubracea
- Ruchholzella
- Rudderina
- Ruggieria
- Ruggieriella
- Ruptivelum
- Rushdisaidina
- Russia
- Rutlandella
- Ruttenella
- Saalfeldella
- Saccarchites
- Saccelatia
- Saffordellina
- Sagittovum
- Sagmatocythere
- Sahnia
- Sahnicythere
- Saida
- Samarella
- Samoilovaella
- Sanniolus
- Sansabella
- Sanyuania
- Sargentina
- Sarlatina
- Sarmatotoxotis
- Sarsicytheridea
- Sarvina
- Sarytumia
- Satiellina
- Saumella
- Savagellites
- Saxellacythere
- Scabriculocypris
- Scaldianella
- Scalptina
- Scanipisthia
- Scaphella Zenkova, 1977 (non Swainson, 1832: preoccupied)
- Scaphina
- Scaphium Jordan, 1964 (non Kirby, 1837: preoccupied)
- Scepticocythereis
- Schallreuteria
- Schallreuterina
- Schizocythere
- Schleesha
- Schmidtella
- Schneideria
- Schrenckia
- Schuleridea
- Schweyerina
- Scipionis
- Sclerochilus
- Scofieldia
- Scrobicula
- Scrobisylthis
- Segmina
- Sekobolla
- Selebratina
- Sellula
- Selon
- Semibolbina
- Semicytheretta
- Semicytheridea
- Semicytherura
- Semihealdioides
- Semikiesowia
- Semilukiella
- Seminolites
- Semipetasus
- Septadella
- Septiferina
- Serenida
- Severella
- Severobolbina
- Severopsis
- Seviculina
- Shemonaella
- Shensiella
- Shergoldopsis
- Shidelerites
- Shidelerites
- Shishaella
- Shivaella
- Shleesha
- Sibiriobolbina
- Sibiritella
- Sibiritia
- Sichuania
- Sigillium
- Sigmobolbina
- Sigmoopsis
- Sigmoopsoides
- Signetopsis
- Sigynus
- Silenis Neckaja, 1958
- Silenites
- Simeonella
- Simicypris
- Sinocoelonella
- Sinocytheridea
- Sinoleperditia
- Sinoprimitia
- Sinusuella
- Siveteria
- Sleia
- Slependia
- Snaidar
- Soanella
- Sollenella
- Sondagella
- Songlinella
- Soudanella
- Speluncella
- Sphaeroleberis
- Sphenicibysis
- Sphenocytheridea
- Spinaechmina
- Spinella
- Spinigerites
- Spinobairdia
- Spinohippula
- Spinoleberis
- Spinomicrtocheilinella
- Spinopleura
- Spongicythere
- Spytihnevites
- Staringia
- Steinachella
- Steinfurtia
- Stenestroemia
- Sternbergea
- Steusloffia
- Steusloffina
- Stibus
- Stictobollia
- Stigmatocythere
- Stillina
- Stratpbythoceratina
- Stravia
- Strepula
- Strepulites
- Striatobythoceratina
- Strigocythere
- Stroterobolbina
- Struveopsis
- Subligaculum
- Subtella
- Subulacypris
- Sudon
- Sulcatiella
- Sulcella
- Sulcicuneus
- Sulcuna
- Sunella
- Suriekovella
- Susus
- Suvalkeilla
- Suzinia
- Svantovites
- Svarogites
- Svatojonitella
- Svealuta
- Swainocythere
- Swantina
- Swartzochilina
- Sylithis
- Sylthere
- Syltherella
- Sylvestra
- Tajurina
- Tallinnella
- Tallinnellina
- Tallinnopsis
- Tambovia
- Tanella
- Taracythere
- Tatariella
- Tavanicythere
- Taxodiella
- Tchizhovaella
- Tegaspis
- Tegea
- Tegmenia
- Teichochilina
- Telegraphia
- Tenebrion
- Tenedocythere
- Terquemula
- Tetracytherurua
- Tetrada
- Tetradella
- Tetrasacculus
- Tetrastorthynx
- Tetrasulcata
- Tetratylus
- Thaerocythere
- Thalmannia
- Thaumatocypris
- Thaumatomma
- Theriosynoecum
- Therioxynpecum
- Thibautina
- Thlipsohealdia
- Thlipsorothella
- Thlipsura
- Thlipsurella
- Thlipsurina
- Thlipsuroides
- Thlipsuropsis
- Thomasatia
- Thrallella
- Tianjinia
- Tickalacythere
- Timiriasevia
- Timiskamella
- Timorhealdia
- Tinotoxotis
- Tirisochilina
- Tmemolophus
- Togoina
- Tollita
- Tomiella
- Tomiellina
- Toolongella
- Torista
- Torusilina
- Trachycythere
- Trachyleberidea
- Trachyleberis
- Trapezisylthere
- Treposella
- Triadocypris
- Triadogigantocypris
- Trianguloschmidtella
- Triassinella
- Triassocypris
- Triassocythere
- Tribolbina
- Tribotoxotis
- Triceratina
- Tricordis
- Tricornina
- Triebacythere
- Triebelina
- Triemilomatella
- Triginglymus
- Trinacriacythere
- Trinota
- Triplacera
- Tropidiana
- Tropidotoxotis
- Truyolsina
- Trypetera
- Tscherdynzeviana
- Tschigovana
- Tschingizella
- Tsitrella
- Tsunyiella
- Tuberculocythere
- Tuberoceratina
- Tubulibairdia
- Tumidella
- Tungschuania
- Turiella
- Turmaekrithe
- Tvaerenella
- Typhloeucytherura
- Uchtovia
- Uhakiella
- Ullehmannia
- Ullerella
- Ulrichella
- Ulrichia
- Undipila
- Undulirete
- Ungerella
- Unicornites
- Unisulcopleura
- Unodentina
- Unzhiella
- Uralina
- Urdia
- Urftella
- Urgachilina
- Urocythere
- Urocythereis
- Uroleberis
- Uscopria
- Ushkarella
- Ussuricavina
- Uthoerina
- Utsatia
- Uvonhachtia
- Uvonhactia
- Vaivanovia
- Valdarella
- Valentinia Crasquin-Soleau in Crasquin-Soleau & Orchard 1994 (non Walsingham, 1907: preoccupied – see Crasquinia)
- Valumoceratina
- Varicobairdia
- Varilatella
- Vattenfallia
- Veenia
- Veeniacythereis
- Veeniceratina
- Velapezoides
- Velarocythere
- Ventrigyrus
- Ventrocythereis
- Venula
- Venzavella
- Vernoniella
- Verseya
- Vesticytherura
- Vestrogothia
- Vetustocytheridea
- Vicinia
- Victoria
- Villozona
- Virgatocypris
- Visnyoella
- Vitella
- Vitissites
- Vitjasiella
- Vittella
- Vltavina
- Vogdesella
- Voibokalina
- Volganella
- Volkina
- Voronina
- Wabiella
- Walcottella
- Waldoria
- Wangiiawania
- Warthinia
- Waylendella
- Webbylla
- Wehrlina
- Welchella
- Wellandia
- Welleria
- Welleriella
- Welleriopsis
- Wicherella
- Wichmannella
- Winchellatia
- Wolburgia
- Wuchiapingella
- Wutingella
- Wuxuania
- Xenoleveris
- Xestoleberis
- Xiajiangella
- Xiangzhoulina
- Xixionopsis
- Xylocythere
- Xystinotus
- Xystista
- Yaoyingella
- Yaxianella
- Yeshanella
- Yichangella
- Yiduella
- Yokopsis
- Youngiella
- Yukonibolbina
- Yulinella
- Zaborovia
- Zabythocypris
- Zagorala
- Zanirinella
- Zarinia
- Zenkopsis
- Zenkovaelina
- Zepaera
- Zhenpingella
- Zhijinella
- Zhongbaoella
- Zigobolboides
- Ziva
- Zorotoxotis
- Zygobeyrichia
- Zygobolba
- Zygobolboides

== See also ==
- List of prehistoric brittle stars
- List of prehistoric sea cucumbers
- List of crinoid genera
