= Discoconchoecia elegans =

Scientific classification
- Kingdom: Animalia
- Phylum: Arthropoda
- Clade: Pancrustacea
- Class: Ostracoda
- Order: Halocyprida
- Family: Halocyprididae
- Genus: Discoconchoecia
- Species: D. elegans

Binomial name
- Discoconchoecia elegans (G. O. Sars, 1866)

Synonyms
- Conchoecia elegans G. O. Sars, 1866; Conehoecia elegans G. O. Sars, 1866 (spelling error)

Species of seed shrimp

Discoconchoecia elegans is a species of ostracods in the subfamily Conchoeciinae. It is found in Norway.
