= Spelaeoecia =

Scientific classification
- Kingdom: Animalia
- Phylum: Arthropoda
- Class: Ostracoda
- Order: Halocyprida
- Family: Deeveyidae
- Genus: Spelaeoecia; Angel & Iliffe, 1987

Genus of seed shrimps

Spelaeoecia is a genus of crustaceans in the family Thaumatocyprididae. One species, the Bermudan endemic S. bermudensis, is listed as critically endangered on the IUCN Red List. It contains the following species:

- Spelaeoecia barri Kornicker in Kornicker & Barr, 1997
- Spelaeoecia bermudensis Angel & Iliffe, 1987
- Spelaeoecia capax Kornicker in Kornicker, Yager & Williams, 1990
- Spelaeoecia cubensis Kornicker & Yager, 1996
- Spelaeoecia hox Kornicker, Iliffe & Harrison-Nelson, 2007
- Spelaeoecia jamaicensis Kornicker & Iliffe, 1992
- Spelaeoecia mayan Kornicker & Iliffe, 1998
- Spelaeoecia parkeri Kornicker, Iliffe & Harrison-Nelson, 2002
- Spelaeoecia sagax Kornicker in Kornicker, Yager & Williams, 1990
- Spelaeoecia saturno Kornicker & Yager, 2002
- Spelaeoecia styx Kornicker in Kornicker, Yager & Williams, 1990
