= Polycopidae =

Halocyprida

Scientific classification
- Kingdom: Animalia
- Phylum: Arthropoda
- Clade: Pancrustacea
- Class: Ostracoda
- Order: Halocyprida
- Superfamily: Polycopoidea; Sars, 1865
- Family: Polycopidae; Sars, 1865

Family of seed shrimps

Polycopidae is a family of marine ostracods. Its members are related to animals in the suborder Halocypridina, but are sufficiently distinct to be placed in the sub-order Cladocopina. There is even some speculation that a separate order may be warranted. The genera in the family differ from the other suborder, Halocypridina, in several features: the central adductor muscle scars are in a triangular (3 scars) or half-rosette (15 scars) pattern, they lack sixth and seventh limbs, and the maxilla (=fourth limb) has both an exopod and endopod (the maxilla in the Halocypridina lacks an exopod).

== Subfamilies and genera ==
The following subfamilies are accepted:

- Polycopinae Sars, 1866
- Polycopsisinae Chavtur, 1983

The following genera not assigned to a subfamily are accepted:

- †Akkermites Melnikova, 1980
- †Alieviella Gou, 1962
- †Antesokolovia Schischkinskaja, 1966
- Axelheibergella Briggs, 1997
- †Chavturopsis Bonaduce & McKenzie, 2004
- Hexopolycope Chavtur, 1981
- Kliecope Tanaka, Tsukagoshi & Karanovic, 2014
- †Nodopolycope Kozur, 1985
- †Paraprimitia Shi, 1964
- †Permopolycope Kozur, 1985
- Polycopinna Chavtur, 1981
- Polycopinoidea Hu & Tao, 2008
- †Rebskeella Bless in Rebske et al., 1985
