= Spelaeoecia bermudensis =

Conservation status
- Critically Endangered (IUCN 2.3)

Scientific classification
- Kingdom: Animalia
- Phylum: Arthropoda
- Class: Ostracoda
- Order: Halocyprida
- Family: Deeveyidae
- Genus: Spelaeoecia
- Species: S. bermudensis

Binomial name
- Spelaeoecia bermudensis Angel & Iliffe, 1987

Species of seed shrimp

Spelaeoecia bermudensis is a species of ostracod in the family Deeveyidae.

The IUCN conservation status of Spelaeoecia bermudensis is "CR", critically endangered. The species faces an extremely high risk of extinction in the immediate future. The IUCN status was reviewed in 1996.
