= Anzor Urdia =

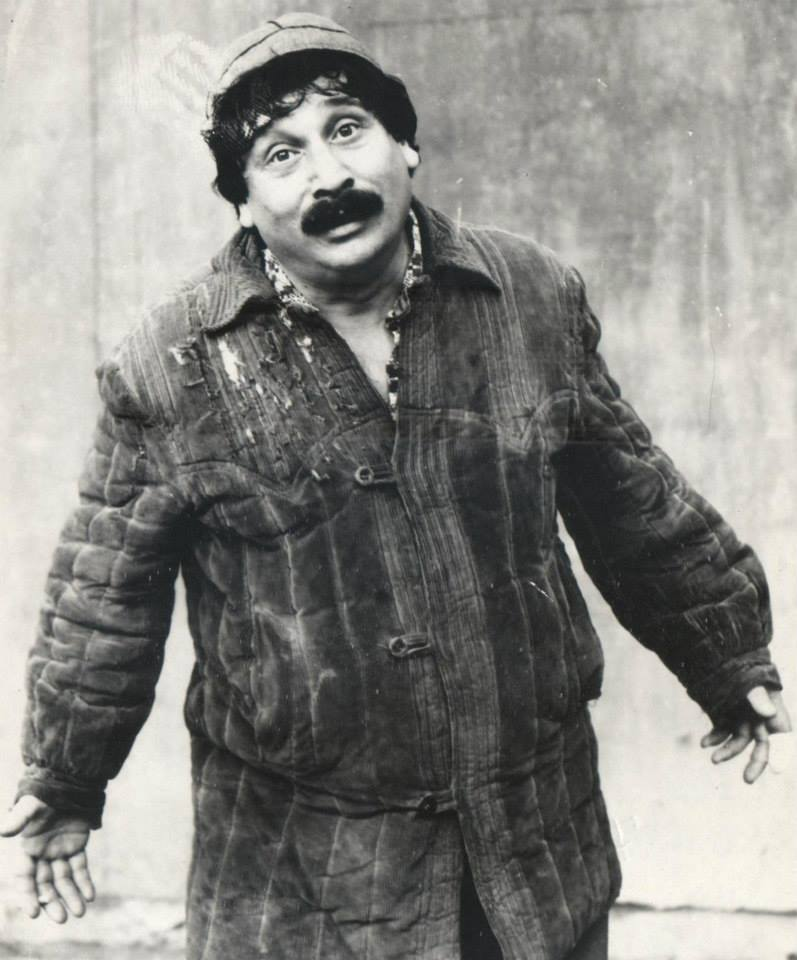
- Born: 12 March 1939; Uman, Ukraine
- Died: 29 September 2011 (aged 72); Tbilisi, Georgia
- Occupation: Actor

Anzor Urdia (Georgian: ანზორ ურდია, Ukrainian: Анзор Урдія; March 12, 1939 – September 29, 2011) was a renowned Georgian theater and film actor. He performed in a number of films, among them was the main role in the iconic Soviet film Data Tutashkhia.

== Biography ==
Urdia was born in Uman, Ukraine in 1939 where his father Varlam Urdia served as a military fighter pilot during the World War II. Urdia and his family moved back to Georgia after his father was killed in Ukraine on October 30, 1945. In Georgia, Urdia studied acting at the prestigious Shota Rustaveli Theatre and Film University and very soon after graduating he became a successful theater actor in a number of theaters in the Soviet Union. Urdia's numerous performances on the theater stage led him to starring and supporting roles in well known Georgian films which included Data Tutashkhia, Kvarkvare, Kukaracha and Pirveli Mertskhali. In a well known Soviet film series which was based on Chabua Amirejibi's book Data Tutashkhia Urdia played the role of a drunken homeless vagrant called Bardghunia. He earned the critical acclaim for his portrayal of Kharabadze in the 1990 film adaptation of Nodar Dumbadze's novel Tetri Bairaghebi (White Flags). In 1980, during the height of his career in both film and theater, Urdia was appointed as the head of administration of the famous Marjanishvili Theatre where he worked for more than ten years. Urdia was married to the Georgian mathematician Nana Gigineishvili with whom he had two children, Varlam Urdia (born 1965) and Mariam Urdia (born in 1982). In 1997, Urdia had a leading role as Stalin in an Austrian production of the historical documentary film. After suffering illness for many years, Urdia died on September 29, 2011, and was interred at the Tbilisi Vake Cemetery.

== Filmography ==
=== Actor ===
- "Chair" (Skami) - Georgia, 2004
- "Love and Potatoes" (Sikvaruli da Kartopili) - Georgia, 2003
- "Antimoz from Iberia" (Antimoz iz Iverii) - Georgia, 2001
- "Fallen Angel" (Pavshi Angel) - Georgia, 1991
- "I am Godfather to Pele" (Me, Peles Natlia) - Georgia, 1991
- "War is for Everyone - Stalin's Son" (Omi yvelastvis Omia - Stalinis shvili) - Georgian SSR, 1990
- "White Flags" (Tetri Bairaghebi) - Georgian SSR, 1990
- "Turandot" - Russian SFSR, 1989
- "Santa Claus" (Tovlis babua) - Georgian SSR, 1986
- "Without Any Risk" (Bez Osobogo Riska) - Georgian SSR/Russian SFSR, 1983
- "Kukaracha" - Georgian SSR, 1982
- "The Marines have No Questions", (Y Motrosov Netu Voprosov') Russian SFSR, 1980
- "Tbilisi-Paris and Back" (Tiflis-Pariz i Obratno) - Georgian SSR, 1980
- "the Break" (Pereviv) - Russian SFSR, 1978
- "Kings and Cabbage" (Korili i Kapusta) - Russian SFSR, 1978
- "Kvarkvare" - Georgian SSR, 1978
- "The Price of Life" (Tsena Zhizni) - Russian SFSR, 1977
- "Data Tutashkhia" - Georgian SSR, 1977
- "First Swallow" (Mertskhali) - Georgian SSR, 1975

== See also ==
- Varlam Urdia, Anzors father and Soviet fighter pilot during the World War II.
- Marjanishvili Theatre
- Cinema of Georgia
