= Humphreysella =

Scientific classification
- Domain: Eukaryota
- Kingdom: Animalia
- Phylum: Arthropoda
- Class: Ostracoda
- Order: Halocyprida
- Family: Thaumatocyprididae
- Genus: Humphreysella; Kornicker & Danielopol in Kornicker, Danielopol & Humphreys, 2006

Synonyms
- Danielopolina (Humphreysella) Kornicker & Danielopol, 2006

Genus of crustaceans

Humphreysella is a genus of ostracods within the family Thaumatocyprididae, containing 11 species. Members of this genus are filter feeders, and can range from sizes of .5 to 32 millimeters in length.

== Species ==
The following species are recognised in the genus Humphreysella:

- Humphreysella bahamensis (Kornicker & Iliffe, 1989)
- Humphreysella baltanasi (Kornicker in Humphreys, Kornicker & Danielopol, 2009)
- Humphreysella elizabethae (Kornicker & Iliffe, 1992)
- Humphreysella exuma (Kornicker & Iliffe, 1998)
- Humphreysella kakuki (Kornicker & Iliffe, 2000)
- Humphreysella mexicana (Kornicker & Iliffe, 1989)
- Humphreysella orghidani (Danielopol, 1972)
- Humphreysella palmeri (Kornicker, Iliffe & Harrison-Nelson, 2007)
- Humphreysella phalanx (Kornicker & Iliffe, 1995)
- Humphreysella styx (Kornicker & Iliffe, 1989)
- Humphreysella wilkensi (Hartmann, 1985)
