= Urdia =

Urdia is a surname. Notable people with the surname include:

- Anzor Urdia (1939–2011), Georgian actor
- Varlam Urdia (1906–1945), Soviet fighter pilot of Georgian origin
