= Discoconchoecia =

Scientific classification
- Domain: Eukaryota
- Kingdom: Animalia
- Phylum: Arthropoda
- Class: Ostracoda
- Order: Halocyprida
- Family: Halocyprididae
- Tribe: Conchoeciini
- Genus: Discoconchoecia; Martens 1979

Species
- Discoconchoecia discophora (G. W. Müller, 1906); Discoconchoecia elegans (G. O. Sars, 1866); Discoconchoecia pseudodiscophora (Rudjakov, 1962); Discoconchoecia tamensis (Poulsen, 1973)

Genus of seed shrimps

Discoconchoecia is a genus of ostracods in the subfamily Conchoeciinae.
