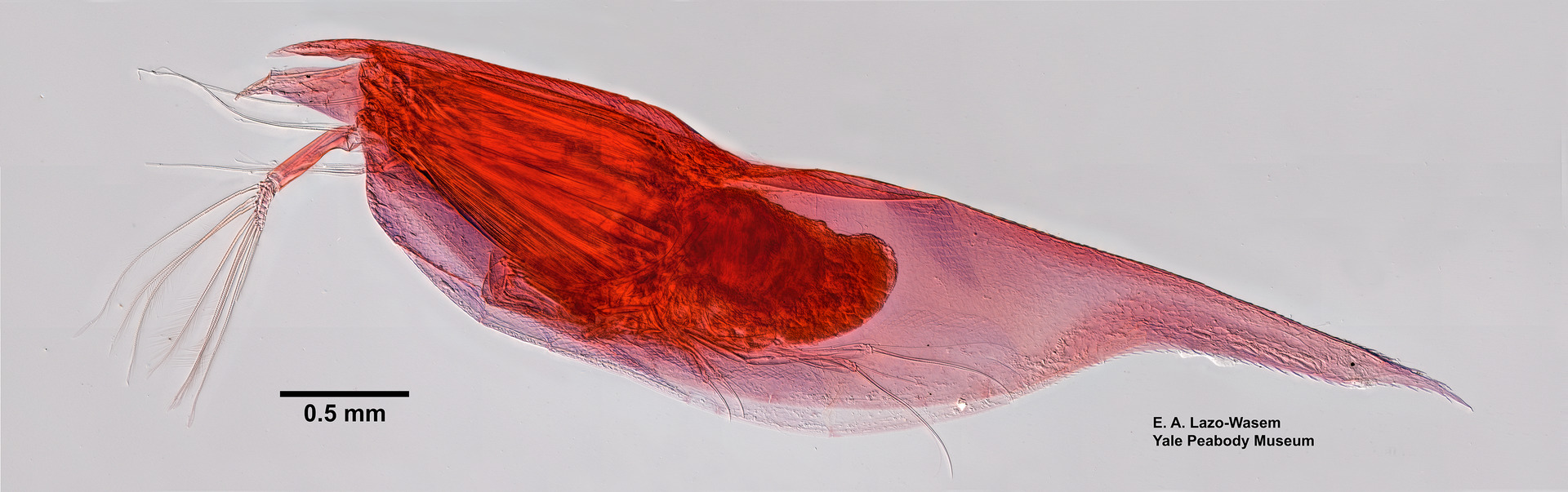
- Conchoecilla daphnoides

Scientific classification
- Kingdom: Animalia
- Phylum: Arthropoda
- Class: Ostracoda
- Order: Halocyprida
- Family: Halocyprididae
- Subfamily: Conchoeciinae; Müller, 1912

Genera
- See text

= Conchoeciinae =

Subfamily of ostracods

Conchoeciinae is a subfamily of ostracods in the family Halocypridae.

== Genera ==
The following genera are recognised in the subfamily Conchoeciinae:

- Alacia Poulsen, 1973
- Austrinoecia Chavtur & Angel, 2011
- Boroecia Poulsen, 1973
- Clausoecia Chavtur & Angel, 2011
- Conchoecetta Claus, 1890
- Conchoecia Dana, 1849
- Conchoecilla Claus, 1890
- Conchoecissa Claus, 1890
- Deeveyoecia Chavtur & Angel, 2011
- Discoconchoecia Martens, 1979
- Gaussicia Poulsen, 1973
- Hyalocoecia Chavtur, 2018 in Chavtur & Bashmanov
- Juryoecia Chavtur & Angel, 2011
- Kyrtoecia Chavtur & Angel, 2011
- Lophuroecia Chavtur, 2018 in Chavtur & Bashmanov
- Loricoecia Poulsen, 1973
- Macrochoecilla Chavtur, 2018 in Chavtur & Bashmanov
- Macroconchoecia Granata & Caporaccio, 1949
- Mamilloecia Graves, 2012
- Metaconchoecia Howe, 1955
- Mikroconchoecia Claus, 1891
- Mollicia Poulsen, 1973
- Nasoecia Chavtur & Angel, 2011
- Obtusoecia Martens, 1979
- Orthoconchoecia Granata & Caporiacco, 1949
- Paraconchoecia Claus, 1891
- Paramollicia Poulsen, 1973
- Parthenoecia Chavtur, 2018 in Chavtur & Bashmanov
- Parvidentoecia Chavtur, 2018 in Chavtur & Bashmanov
- Platyconchoecia Poulsen, 1973
- Porroecia Martens, 1979
- Proceroecia Kock, 1992
- Pseudoconchoecia Claus, 1891
- Rotundoecia Chavtur & Angel, 2011
- Vityazoecia Chavtur & Angel, 2011
