= Thaumatocyprididae =

Thaumatocyprididae Temporal range: 259.9–Recent Ma

Scientific classification
- Domain: Eukaryota
- Kingdom: Animalia
- Phylum: Arthropoda
- Class: Ostracoda
- Order: Halocyprida
- Suborder: Halocypridina
- Family: Thaumatocyprididae; Müller, 1906

Family of seed shrimps

Thaumatocyprididae is a family of ostracods in the order Halocyprida which contains seven genera and one subfamily. It first appeared in the Lopingian Epoch, 259.9 million years ago.

== Genera and subfamilies ==
- Subfamily †Pokornyopsinae Kozur, 1974
  - Genus †Pokornyopsis Kozur, 1974
- Genus Danielopolina Kornicker & Sohn, 1976
- Genus Humphreysella Kornicker & Danielopol in Kornicker, Danielopol & Humphreys, 2006
- Genus Thaumatoconcha Kornicker & Sohn, 1976
- Genus Thaumatocypris Mueller, 1906
- Genus Thaumatomma Kornicker & Sohn, 1976
- Genus Welesina Iglikowska & Boxshall, 2013
