= Halocyprididae =

Scientific classification
- Domain: Eukaryota
- Kingdom: Animalia
- Phylum: Arthropoda
- Class: Ostracoda
- Order: Halocyprida
- Suborder: Halocypridina
- Family: Halocyprididae; Dana, 1853

Subfamilies
- Archiconchoecinae Poulsen, 1969; Bathyconchoeciinae Angel & Graves, 2013; Conchoeciinae Müller, 1912; Euconchoecinae Poulsen, 1969; Halocypridinae Dana, 1853

Synonyms
- Conchoecidae; Conchoeciidae; Halocypridae [lapsus]

Family of seed shrimps

Halocypridae is a family of ostracods in the order Halocyprida. Some members are bioluminescent, such as Conchoecia pseudodiscophora, and are believed to use coelenterazine and a coelenterazine luciferase, rather than vargulin.

== Genera ==
The following genera are recognised in the family Halocyprididae:

- Alacia Poulsen, 1973
- Archiconchoecemma Chavtur & Stovbun, 2003
- Archiconchoecerra Chavtur & Stovbun, 2003
- Archiconchoecetta Chavtur & Stovbun, 2003
- Archiconchoecia Müller, 1894
- Archiconchoecilla Chavtur & Stovbun, 2003
- Archiconchoecinna Chavtur & Stovbun, 2003
- Archiconchoecissa Chavtur & Stovbun, 2003
- Austrinoecia Chavtur & Angel, 2011
- Bathyconchoecetta Chavtur, 2018
- Bathyconchoecia Deevey, 1968
- Boroecia Poulsen, 1973
- Chavturia Angel, 2013
- Clausoecia Chavtur & Angel, 2011
- Conchoecetta Claus, 1890
- Conchoecia Dana, 1849
- Conchoecilla Claus, 1890
- Conchoecissa Claus, 1890
- Deeveyoecia Chavtur & Angel, 2011
- Discoconchoecia Martens, 1979
- Euconchoecia Müller, 1890
- Fellia Poulsen, 1969
- Gaussicia Poulsen, 1973
- Halocypretta Chavtur & Stovbun, 2008
- Halocypria Poulsen, 1969
- Halocypris Dana, 1853
- Hyalocoecia Chavtur, in Chavtur & Bashmanov, 2018
- Juryoecia Chavtur & Angel, 2011
- Kyrtoecia Chavtur & Angel, 2011
- Lophuroecia Chavtur, in Chavtur & Bashmanov, 2018
- Loricoecia Poulsen, 1973
- Macrochoecilla Chavtur, in Chavtur & Bashmanov, 2018
- Macroconchoecia Granata & Caporaccio, 1949
- Mamilloecia Graves, 2012
- Metaconchoecia Howe, 1955
- Mikroconchoecia Claus, 1891
- Muelleroecia Chavtur & Angel, 2011
- Mollicia Poulsen, 1973
- Nasoecia Chavtur & Angel, 2011
- Obtusoecia Martens, 1979
- Orthoconchoecia Granata & Caporiacco, 1949
- Paraconchoecia Claus, 1891
- Paramollicia Poulsen, 1973
- Parthenoecia Chavtur, in Chavtur & Bashmanov, 2018
- Parvidentoecia Chavtur, in Chavtur & Bashmanov, 2018
- Platyconchoecia Poulsen, 1973
- Porroecia Martens, 1979
- Proceroecia Kock, 1992
- Pseudoconchoecia Claus, 1891
- Rotundoecia Chavtur & Angel, 2011
- Schornikovoecia Chavtur in Chavtur & Bashmanov, 2018
- Scottoecia Angel, 2012
- Septemoecia Angel & Brandao, 2018
- Vityazoecia Chavtur & Angel, 2011
