= Yemanja (ostracod) =

Scientific classification
- Kingdom: Animalia
- Phylum: Arthropoda
- Clade: Pancrustacea
- Class: Ostracoda
- Order: Podocopida
- Family: Macrocyprididae
- Genus: Yemanja; Brandão, 2010

Type species
- Yemanja coimbrai

Genus of ostracods

Yemanja is a genus of ostracods in the family Macrocyprididae described by Simone Nunes Brandão in 2010.

== Species ==
The following species are recognized:

- Yemanja coimbrai Brandão, 2005
- Yemanja hawkae Maddocks, 1990
- Yemanja rocas Brandão, 2005
- Yemanja youngi Brandão, 2005
