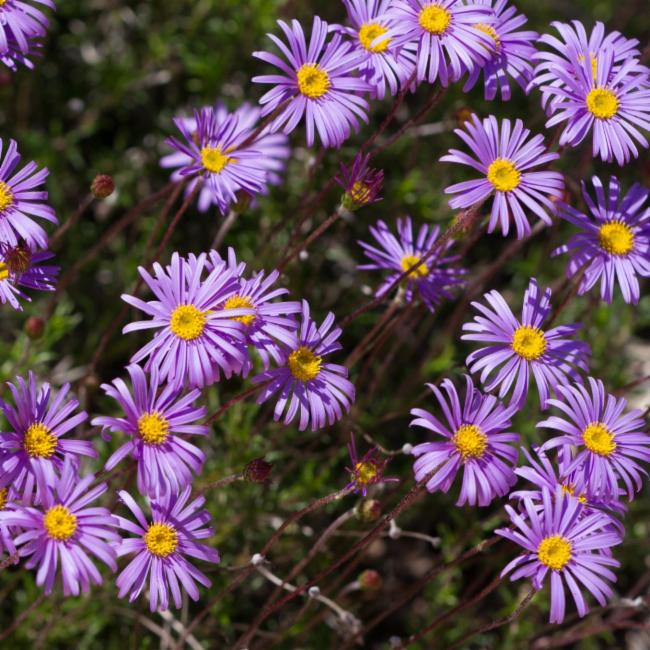
- Vicinia ciliata near Murray Bridge

Scientific classification
- Kingdom: Plantae
- Clade: Tracheophytes
- Clade: Angiosperms
- Clade: Eudicots
- Clade: Asterids
- Order: Asterales
- Family: Asteraceae
- Genus: Vicinia
- Species: V. ciliata

Binomial name
- Vicinia ciliata (Benth.) G.L.Nesom

Synonyms
- Aster huegelii F.Muell.; Eurybia ciliata Benth. (1837) (basionym); Eurybia ciliata var. glabrata Sond.; Olearia ciliata (Benth.) F.Muell. ex Benth.; Olearia ciliata var. hispida Benth.; Shawia ciliata (Benth.) Sch.Bip.

= Vicinia ciliata =

Species of shrub

Vicinia ciliata, commonly known as the fringed daisy bush, is a small shrub with large clusters of bright purple-blue flowers on a single stem.

== Description ==
Vicinia ciliata is a small upright spreading shrub about 15–30 cm (5.9–11.8 in) high with more or less woody, wiry, reddish stems 2–15 cm (0.79–5.91 in) long. The stems are rough with short hairs and are finely ribbed usually branched from the base of the plant. The leaf upper side is bright green, rough or slightly smooth with a paler hairy underside, about 150 mm (5.9 in) long and sessile. The leaves are linear to narrow tapering gradually to a fine point or occasionally lobed at the apex 0.5–2 cm (0.20–0.79 in) long and 1–2 mm (0.039–0.079 in) wide. The leaf margins are entire, rough with short white hairs, rolled under and fringed. The single flowers are at the end of an unbranched peduncle 2–25 cm (0.79–9.84 in) long. The 3 green over-lapping bracts are woolly, narrow lance-shaped and fringed. The flowers are 2–3 cm (0.79–1.18 in) across with mauve to purple "petals" (strictly ligules of the ray florets) are 12–15 mm (0.47–0.59 in) long. The flower centre is yellow and consists of 40-75 disk florets. The fruit is a dry one-seeded capsule about 2 mm (0.079 in) long, smooth or with fine soft hairs and faint longitudinal lines. Flowers from late winter to spring on occasion in autumn.

== Taxonomy and naming ==
Fringed daisy bush was first formally described in 1837 by George Bentham who gave it the name Eurybia ciliata in Stefan Endlicher's Enumeratio plantarum quas in Novae Hollandiae ora austro-occidentali ad fluvium Cygnorum et in sinu Regis Georgii collegit Carolus Liber Baro de Hügel from specimens collected near King George Sound. The specific epithet (ciliata) means "fringed with fine hairs" and is derived from the Latin word cilium meaning "eyelash" or "eyelid". In 1867, George Bentham changed the name to Olearia ciliata in Flora Australiensis. In 2020 Guy L. Nesom placed the species in the newly-described genus Vicinia as V. ciliata after Olearia had been found to be polyphyletic.

== Distribution and habitat ==
The fringed daisy-bush is a widespread species found in several southern Australian states predominantly on well-drained sandy soils. In Victoria it grows on sandy and mallee heath in the north-west of Victoria and scattered locations in the woodlands of the Grampians, Brisbane Ranges and Wilsons Promontory. In Western Australia it grows on rocky lateritic or sandy soils on coastal dunes and sand plains mainly near Esperance and Albany. In South Australia mostly on coastal fringes and in Tasmania along the east and south-east coast.
