= Halocypridina =

Scientific classification
- Domain: Eukaryota
- Kingdom: Animalia
- Phylum: Arthropoda
- Class: Ostracoda
- Order: Halocyprida
- Suborder: Halocypridina; Dana, 1853

Families
- Deeveyidae; Halocypridae; Thaumatocyprididae

Suborder of seed shrimps

Halocypridina is a suborder of seed shrimp in the order Halocyprida. Ostracods of this group often have a dorsoposterior spine on the carapace. The adductor muscle scars show various patterns, in contrast to those of the Cladocopina, which are in a triangular pattern (three scars) or a half-rosette (15 scars). A sixth limb is present (absent in Cladocopina). The group is divided into the Halocypridae and the Thaumatocyprididae.
