= Macromckenziea =

Scientific classification
- Kingdom: Animalia
- Phylum: Arthropoda
- Clade: Pancrustacea
- Class: Ostracoda
- Order: Podocopida
- Family: Macrocyprididae
- Genus: Macromckenziea; Maddocks, 1990

Type species
- Macromckenziea siliquosa

Genus of ostracods

Macromckenziea is a genus of ostracods in the family Macrocyprididae described by Rosalie Maddocks in 1990.

== Species ==
The following species are recognized:

- Macromckenziea anceps Rome, 1942
- †Macromckenziea australiana Neale, 1975
- Macromckenziea giambonini Brandão, 2010
- Macromckenziea glacierae Maddocks, 1990
- Macromckenziea gregalis Maddocks, 1990
- Macromckenziea ligustica Bonaduce, Masoli & Pugliese, 1977
- †Macromckenziea porcelanica Whatley & Downing, 1984
- Macromckenziea siliquosa Brady, 1886
- Macromckenziea swansoni Maddocks, 1990
