= Vedidkari =

Town in Georgia

Vedidkari ვედიდკარი
- village
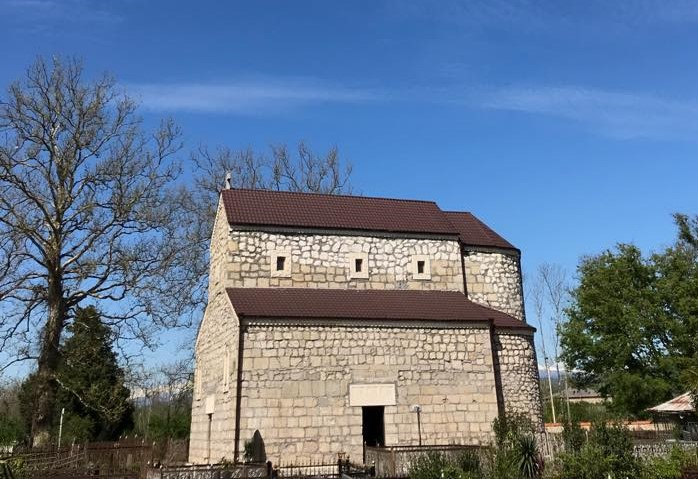
- 7th century church in Vedidkari

- Location of Vedidkari in Georgia Vedidkari (Samegrelo-Zemo Svaneti)
- Coordinates: 42°19′50″N 42°16′21″E
- Country: Georgia
- Region: Samegrelo-Zemo Svaneti
- Municipality: Martvili
- Elevation: 80 m (260 ft)

Population (2014)
  - Total: 713
- Time zone: UTC+4 (Georgian time)

Vedidkari (Georgian: ვედიდკარი) is a village in Samegrelo-Zemo Svaneti province of Western Georgia. The village is located in 15 kilometers from Martvili. According to the data of 2014, 713 people live in the village of Vedidkari. A small Jewish community existed in the village since the second half of 18th century.

== Notable people ==
- Soviet World War II bomber pilot Colonel Varlam Urdia was born in Vedidkari.
