= Macrocypria =

- Macrocypria sarsi

Scientific classification
- Kingdom: Animalia
- Phylum: Arthropoda
- Clade: Pancrustacea
- Class: Ostracoda
- Order: Podocopida
- Family: Macrocyprididae
- Genus: Macrocypria; Sars, 1923

Type species
- Macrocypria sarsi Müller, 1912

Genus of ostracods

Macrocypria is a genus of ostracods in the family Macrocyprididae described by Georg Ossian Sars in 1923.

== Species ==
The following species are recognized:

- Macrocypria canariensis Brady, 1880
- Macrocypria sarsi Müller, 1912
- Macrocypria semesa Maddocks, 1990
