= Macroscapha =

Scientific classification
- Kingdom: Animalia
- Phylum: Arthropoda
- Clade: Pancrustacea
- Class: Ostracoda
- Order: Podocopida
- Family: Macrocyprididae
- Genus: Macroscapha; Maddocks, 1990

Type species
- Macroscapha atlantica

Genus of ostracods

Macroscapha is a genus of ostracods in the family Macrocyprididae described by Rosalie Maddocks in 1990.

== Species ==
The following species are recognized:

- Macroscapha atlantica Maddocks, 1990
- Macroscapha cactus Brandão, 2010
- Macroscapha falcis Brandão, 2010
- Macroscapha gyreae Maddocks, 1990
- Macroscapha heroica Maddocks, 1990
- Macroscapha inaequalis Müller, 1908
- Macroscapha inaequata Maddocks, 1990
- Macroscapha jiangi Maddocks, 1990
- †Macroscapha limburgensis Veen, 1936
- Macroscapha marchilensis Hartmann, 1965
- Macroscapha opaca Maddocks, 1990
- Macroscapha procera Jellinek & Swanson, 2003
- Macroscapha rehmi Brandão, 2010
- Macroscapha scotia Brandão, 2010
- Macroscapha sinuata Maddocks, 1990
- Macroscapha solecavai Brandão, 2010
- Macroscapha subhemispherica Brandão, 2010
- Macroscapha turbida Müller, 1908
- Macroscapha walterae Brandão, 2010
