= Conchoecia =

Scientific classification
- Domain: Eukaryota
- Kingdom: Animalia
- Phylum: Arthropoda
- Class: Ostracoda
- Order: Halocyprida
- Family: Halocyprididae
- Subfamily: Conchoeciinae
- Tribe: Conchoeciini
- Genus: Conchoecia; Dana, 1853

Species
- See text

Genus of seed shrimps

Conchoecia is a genus of ostracods in the subfamily Conchoeciinae.

The genus contains bioluminescent species. Conchoecia have a coelenterazine luciferin based bioluminescent system, unlike the cypridinid luciferin based system found in the Cypridinidae.

== Species ==
The following species are recognised in the genus Conchoecia:

- Conchoecia angustipilata Chavtur, in Chavtur & Bashmanov, 2018
- Conchoecia belgicae Müller, 1906
- Conchoecia giesbrechti Müller, 1906
- Conchoecia glandulosa Müller, G. W., 1906
- Conchoecia hettacra Müller, 1906
- Conchoecia indica Merrylal James, 1972
- Conchoecia isocheira Müller, G. W., 1906
- Conchoecia kyrtophora Müller, G. W., 1906
- Conchoecia leptothrix Müller, 1906
- Conchoecia magna Claus, 1874
- Conchoecia rudyakovi Chavtur, in Chavtur & Bashmanov, 2018
- Conchoecia sculpta Chavtur, in Chavtur & Bashmanov, 2018
- Conchoecia subarcuata Claus, 1890
- Conchoecia teretivalvata Iles, 1953

== See also ==
- List of prehistoric ostracod genera
