= Macrocyprissa =

Scientific classification
- Kingdom: Animalia
- Phylum: Arthropoda
- Clade: Pancrustacea
- Class: Ostracoda
- Order: Podocopida
- Family: Macrocyprididae
- Genus: Macrocyprissa; Triebel, 1960

Type species
- †Macrocyprissa cylindracea

Genus of ostracods

Macrocyprissa is a genus of ostracods in the family Macrocyprididae described by Erich Triebel in 1960.

== Species ==
The following species are recognized:

- †Macrocyprissa arcuata Colalongo & Pasini, 1980
- †Macrocyprissa cylindracea Bornemann, 1855
- Macrocyprissa vandenboldi Maddocks, 1990
