= Macropyxis =

Scientific classification
- Kingdom: Animalia
- Phylum: Arthropoda
- Clade: Pancrustacea
- Class: Ostracoda
- Order: Podocopida
- Family: Macrocyprididae
- Genus: Macropyxis; Maddocks, 1990

Type species
- Macrocypris sapeloensis

Genus of ostracods

Macropyxis is a genus of ostracods in the family Macrocyprididae described by Rosalie Maddocks in 1990.

== Species ==
The following species are recognized:

- Macropyxis adrecta Maddocks, 1990
- Macropyxis adriatica Breman, 1975
- Macropyxis adunca Maddocks, 1990
- Macropyxis alanlordi Brandão, 2010
- Macropyxis amanda Maddocks, 1990
- Macropyxis amoena Maddocks, 1990
- Macropyxis andreseni Jellinek & Swanson, 2003
- Macropyxis antonbruunae Maddocks, 1990
- Macropyxis arta Maddocks, 1990
- Macropyxis audens Maddocks, 1990
- Macropyxis bathyalensis Hulings, 1967
- Macropyxis cronini Brandão, 2010
- Macropyxis eltaninae Maddocks, 1990
- Macropyxis ghartmanni Brandão, 2010
- Macropyxis hornei Brandão, 2010
- Macropyxis improcera Maddocks, 1990
- Macropyxis jeans Brandão, 2010
- Macropyxis kaesleri Maddocks, 1990
- Macropyxis kalbi Maddocks, 1990
- Macropyxis kornickeri Maddocks, 1990
- Macropyxis labutisi Maddocks, 1990
- †Macropyxis limburgensis (Veen, 1934)
- †Macropyxis longana Bold, 1960
- Macropyxis parajeans Brandão, 2010
- †Macropyxis rhodana (Bold, 1960)
- Macropyxis sapeloensis Darby, 1965
- Macropyxis similis (Brady, 1880)
- Macropyxis simulans Maddocks, 1990
- Macropyxis sonneae Jellinek & Swanson, 2003
- Macropyxis steinecki Maddocks, 1990
- Macropyxis tenuicauda Brady, 1880
- Macropyxis thiedei Jellinek & Swanson, 2003
