= Macrocyprididae =

- Macrocypria sarsi

Scientific classification
- Kingdom: Animalia
- Phylum: Arthropoda
- Clade: Pancrustacea
- Class: Ostracoda
- Order: Podocopida
- Family: Macrocyprididae; Müller, 1912

Synonyms
- Macrocyprinae; Macrocypridinae

Family of crustaceans

Macrocyprididae is a family of crustaceans belonging to the order Podocopida.

== Description ==
The Macrocyprididae are remarkably consistent in their physical characteristics as compared to other Podocopida familes. Species in this family typicall have a thick, yellowish-white carapace which presents as opaque white in the fossil record. Members of Macromckenziea have a thick, chitinous inner lining that typically results in these individuals being darker yellow or brown in color. Other genera have external white, opaque patches that lead to them having a tricolor appearance.

Their external surface is completely smooth and gently undulating, particularly near their pore canals, and it is believed that this smooth surface protects them from attaching bacteria and diatoms. They have small, external, cone-shaped pores that vary in diameter and prominence on a given individual, but it has not yet been determined if their relative positions are fixed or variable. The pores have simple, straight setae that vary in length in thickness.

The hinge structure, which controls the opening and closing of their bivalve shells, is consistent throughout the family and distinctive from other related families of Podocopids.

== Taxonomy ==
The Macrocyprididae are the smallest and most homogeneous of the families that make up the superfamily Cypridacea. Due to their lack of physical variation, the family was only organized into a single genus until 1960 given the lack of features with which to differentiate them into separate taxa. Originally described by Gustav Wilhelm Müller in 1912 as Macrocyprinae, the modern organization of this taxa is derived from a 1990 monograph Living and Fossil Macrocyprididae.

== Genera ==
The following genera are recognized:

- Macrocypria Sars, 1923
- Macrocyprina Triebel, 1960
- Macrocypris Brady, 1867
- Macrocyprissa Triebel, 1960
- Macromckenziea Maddocks, 1990
- Macropyxis Maddocks, 1990
- Macrosarisa Maddocks, 1990
- Macroscapha Maddocks, 1990
- †Praemacrocypris Kozur, 1971
- Yemanja Brandão, 2010

== Distribution and habitat ==
The Macrocyprididae have cosmopolitan distribution and are found in nearly all euhaline environments. However, only one or two species is typically represented in any given location. Unlike some other ostracod families, the Macrocyprididae have not adapted to low or fluctuating salinities and are poorly represented in most coastal habitats.

== Ecology and behavior ==
Unlike the related Pontocyprididae, there is no evidence of macrocypridid parasitism with larger invertebrates. They are typically solitary, slow-moving, and subsist by ingesting sediments on the seafloor.

== Futher reading ==
- Maddocks, Rosalie F. (1990) "Living and Fossil Macrocyprididae (Ostracoda)" The University of Kansas Paleontological Institute
- Müller, Gustav Wilhelm. (1921) "Ostracoda" Das Tierreich
