= Polycopoidea =

Scientific classification
- Kingdom: Animalia
- Phylum: Arthropoda
- Clade: Pancrustacea
- Class: Ostracoda
- Order: Halocyprida
- Suborder: Cladocopina; Sars, 1865
- Superfamily: Polycopoidea; Sars, 1865

Family of seed shrimps

Polycopoidea is a superfamily of marine ostracods. It is the only superfamily in the suborder Cladocopina.

There are two families recognised in the superfamily Polycopoidea:

- Polycopidae Sars, 1865
- †Quasipolycopidae Jones, 1995
