= Data Tutashkhia =

1975 novel by Chabua Amirejibi

- First edition
- Author: Chabua Amirejibi
- Original title: დათა თუთაშხია
- Translator: Antonina W. Bouis
- Language: Georgian
- Genre: Novel Philosophical fiction Historical fiction
- Publisher: Raduga Publishers
- Publication date: 1975 1985 in English.
- Publication place: Georgia
- Media type: Print (hardback)
- Pages: 730 pages
- ISBN: 978-5050000064

Data Tutashkhia (Georgian: დათა თუთაშხია) is a novel written by Chabua Amirejibi in 1962-1972. It was translated to English from a Russian translation by Antonina W. Bouis in 1985. This is one of the most popular readable novels in Georgia and former Soviet countries.

== Description ==
The novel is a story of a Georgian outlaw of the Imperial Russian period, a very popular theme in Georgian literature, and combines thrilling escapades with Dostoevskian dealings with the fate of an individual and national soul. The story is narrated by a Russian gendarme, Count Szeged, who frequently passes the story-telling on to other characters. The novel follows the life of outlaw Data Tutashkhia, who spends years eluding capture by the Tsarist police. They are led by Data's cousin, his detached and imperturbable double, Mushni Zarandia. The book, and the feature film based on it, turned Data Tutaskhia into an iconic hero, widely popular in Georgia.

== Plot and structure ==
The novel is divided into four parts chronicling its hero's, Data Tutashkhia's, moral evolution, always narrated from the perspective of a multitude of characters from Tutashkhia's past. He is a man who from birth, can not stand injustice and wrongdoing. At the very beginning of the novel, we learn that he was convicted of an accidental killing that even the victim absolved him of. This then began his life as a fugitive, constantly running from police desperate to catch him. Throughout the novel, He goes from place to place, sees evil and struggles with how to overcome it. In the first part of the novel, Tutashkhia attempts to help those wronged with little result, as either the individual wronged (strangely enough) continues to allow him/herself to be wronged (as in the case of the loser at cards continuing to allow himself to be cheated by card sharks); or the injured and insulted, once rescued by Data, start, themselves, to injure and insult (as was the case with the married pair whom Tutashkhia assisted to purchase a cow). An excellent, memorable tale in this section of the novel was that of the hospital patients, whom he likened to the cannibal rats bred by one of the residents.

In the second part of the novel Data Tutashkhia, saddened by his previous experiences, decides not to intervene at all in societal issues unless absolutely certain that his actions would bring good. His new stance had the result of people forgetting all of his past good deeds, and turning on him for his 'indifference'.

In the third part of the novel, Tutashkhia, who has by this point lost his way, attempts to mingle in society in order to determine for himself a meaning and way forward in life. He joins the company of a lawyer and a mysterious woman and their little group engages in various philosophical debates over drinks. This portion of the story is both interesting, in terms of the philosophical debates, and suspenseful. The segment's climax, the dinner at the lawyer's home (with its 'mystery' guest), is particularly suspenseful and well-written.

In the next section of the novel, Data Tutashkhia decides that evil can only be overcome by force. Here, we learn more about his cousin, who by this time, is one of the Russian imperial gendarme's 'best and brightest'. Completely 'devoted' to his job and 'unbiased', he zealously oversees a program to rid the region of 'dangerous' outlaws such as his cousin. It is in this section that we truly gain an understanding of which of the brothers really is the danger to society and the regime.

In the final part of the book, Tutashkhia finally decides for himself, based on all of his past experiences, that the best way to rid the world of evil is to do good. This section of the novel features a gripping ending, as well as the final confrontation between Data and his family.

== Adaptation ==
TV mini series Data Tutashkhia (Georgian დათა თუთაშხია or Russian Берега, 1977), Georgian Film Studio, directed by Giga Lordkipanidze and Gizo Gabeskiria. Starring Otar Megvinetukhutsesi (Data) and Tengiz Archvadze (Mushni).
