= Mojczella =

Mojczella Temporal range: Ordovician

Scientific classification
- Kingdom: Animalia
- Phylum: Arthropoda
- Clade: Pancrustacea
- Class: Ostracoda
- Order: Palaeocopida
- Family: †Tvaerenellidae
- Genus: †Mojczella; Olempska, 1988

Type species
- Mojczella jaanussoni Olempska, 1988

Other species
- Mojczella polonica Olempska, 1988; Mojczella sanctacrucensis Olempska, 1988

Extinct genus of ostracod

Mojczella is an extinct genus of tvaerenellid ostracod that lived during the Ordovician period.

== Etymology ==
The generic name Mojczella derives from Mójcza, the type locality of the genus. The specific epithet of the species Mojczella polonica is derived from Polonia, the Latin word for Poland. The specific epithet of Mojczella jaanussoni, the type species, honours the scientist Valdar Jaanusson from Stockholm. The specific epithet of Mojczella sanctacrucensis is derived from the Latin term for the Świętokrzyskie Mountains, known in English as the Holy Cross Mountains, the mountain range in which fossils of the genus have been found.

== Evolution ==
The rate of evolution of the sulcus-surrounding crest in Mojczella was among the more variably evolving phenotypic features. The fastest evolution of this phenotype over the course of the occurrence of the genus in the Mójcza section was in the form of its manifestation in adult Mojczella, while it was less pronounced in late moult stages and almost undetectable in early moult stages.
