= Macrocypris =

Scientific classification
- Kingdom: Animalia
- Phylum: Arthropoda
- Clade: Pancrustacea
- Class: Ostracoda
- Order: Podocopida
- Family: Macrocyprididae
- Genus: Macrocypris; Brady, 1867

Type species
- Macrocypris minna

Genus of ostracods

Macrocypris is a genus of ostracods in the family Macrocyprididae described by George Stewardson Brady in 1867.

== Species ==
The following species are recognized:

- †Macrocypris acuminata Cooper, 1941
- †Macrocypris aequabilis Oertli, 1959
- †Macrocypris alta Jones, 1887
- †Macrocypris bicurvata Cooper, 1946
- †Macrocypris bradiana Jones, 1884
- Macrocypris compressa Seguenza, 1883
- †Macrocypris concinna Jones & Hinde, 1890
- Macrocypris decora Brady
- †Macrocypris dimorpha Hazel & Holden, 1971
- Macrocypris elongata Seguenza, 1883
- †Macrocypris eocuneata Hornibrook, 1953
- †Macrocypris fontinensis Terquem, 1885
- †Macrocypris garrisonensis Upson, 1933
- †Macrocypris gigantea Conti, 1954
- Macrocypris gracilis Seguenza, 1883
- †Macrocypris gracillima (Richter, 1867) Bassler & Kellett, 1934
- †Macrocypris graysonensis Alexander, 1929
- Macrocypris hsingkuoa Hu & Tao, 2008
- †Macrocypris illinoiensis Scott & Borger, 1941
- Macrocypris inflata Seguenza, 1883
- †Macrocypris insignis Lienenklaus, 1900
- †Macrocypris kirkbyana (Jones, 1885) Bassler & Kellett, 1934
- †Macrocypris kovacsiensis Mehes, 1936
- †Macrocypris lenticularis Cooper, 1946
- Macrocypris liassica Bate & Coleman, 1975
- †Macrocypris luganensis Conti, 1954
- Macrocypris maioris Maddocks, 1990
- †Macrocypris marginata (Richter, 1867) Bassler & Kellett, 1934
- Macrocypris metuenda Maddocks, 1990
- Macrocypris minna (Baird, 1850)
- †Macrocypris minuta Swain & Peterson, 1952
- Macrocypris miranda Maddocks, 1990
- †Macrocypris mucronata Conti, 1954
- Macrocypris nimia Maddocks, 1990
- Macrocypris niuerhia Hu & Tao, 2008
- †Macrocypris oolithica Terquem, 1885
- Macrocypris opinabilis Maddocks, 1990
- †Macrocypris ovata Cooper, 1941
- †Macrocypris pacifica Hu, 1979
- †Macrocypris panxianensis Wang, 1978
- Macrocypris peteria Hu & Tao, 2008
- †Macrocypris posterobtusa Wang, 1978
- †Macrocypris prima Mehes, 1936
- Macrocypris proclivis Maddocks, 1990
- †Macrocypris reginni Coryell & Johnson, 1939
- Macrocypris sansheia Hu & Tao, 2008
- Macrocypris shechiia Hu & Tao, 2008
- †Macrocypris siliqua Veen, 1934
- †Macrocypris siliquoides Jones, 1887
