= Macrosarisa =

Scientific classification
- Kingdom: Animalia
- Phylum: Arthropoda
- Clade: Pancrustacea
- Class: Ostracoda
- Order: Podocopida
- Family: Macrocyprididae
- Genus: Macrosarisa; Maddocks, 1990

Type species
- Macrosarisa bensoni

Genus of ostracods

Macrosarisa is a genus of ostracods in the family Macrocyprididae described by Rosalie Maddocks in 1990.

== Species ==
The following species are recognized:

- Macrosarisa andeep Brandão, 2010
- Macrosarisa bensoni Maddocks, 1990
- Macrosarisa capacis Maddocks, 1990
- †Macrosarisa elegantula Whatley & Downing, 1984
- †Macrosarisa exquisita Kaye, 1964
- Macrosarisa fahrbachi Brandão, 2010
- †Macrosarisa graysonensis Alexander, 1929
- Macrosarisa hiulca Maddocks, 1990
- †Macrosarisa muensteriana Jones & Hinde, 1890
- †Macrosarisa siliqua Jones, 1849
- †Macrosarisa simplex Chapman, 1898
- Macrosarisa texana Maddocks, 1990
- †Macrosarisa wrightii Jones & Hinde, 1890
