= Cystomatochilina =

Cystomatochilina Temporal range: Silurian

Scientific classification
- Kingdom: Animalia
- Phylum: Arthropoda
- Clade: Pancrustacea
- Class: Ostracoda
- Order: Palaeocopida
- Suborder: †Palaeocopa
- Superfamily: †Eurychilinacea
- Family: †Eurychilinidae
- Genus: †Cystomatochilina; Jaanusson, 1957

Species
- †Cystomatochilina elegans Přibyl, 1988; †Cystomatochilina umbonata (Krause, 1892)

Extinct genus of seed shrimps

Cystomatochilina is an extinct genus of ostracods in the order Palaeocopida.

2 species are described (C. elegans and C. umbonata). Both are from the Silurian. C. elegans is described from central Bohemia.
