= Chabua Amirejibi =

Georgian novelist and human rights activist

ჭაბუა ამირეჯიბი Chabua Amirejibi
- Born: 18 November 1921; Tbilisi, Georgian SSR, Soviet Union (now Georgia)
- Died: 12 December 2013 (aged 92); Tbilisi, Georgia
- Occupations: writer, novelist
- Writing career
- Genre: Literary realism
- Notable work: Data Tutashkhia

Mzechabuk "Chabua" Amirejibi, (often written as "Amiredjibi", Georgian: მზეჭაბუკ "ჭაბუა" ამირეჯიბი; 18 November 1921 – 12 December 2013) was a Georgian novelist and Soviet-era dissident notable for his magnum opus, Data Tutashkhia, and his many years in Soviet prisons.

== Early life and career ==
He was born in Tbilisi, Georgian SSR, in 1921. His family, once a princely house, was heavily repressed during Joseph Stalin's Great Purge: his father was shot in 1938 and his mother sent to a Gulag camp. During World War II, he was recruited into the Red Army, but was soon sacked due to his family background.

Subsequently, he became involved in anti-Soviet activities, becoming a member of the underground political organization Tetri Giorgi. In April 1944, he was arrested on coup plot charges and sentenced to twenty-five years of imprisonment in Siberia. After fifteen years in prison, three prison escapes, and two death sentences, he was ultimately rehabilitated in 1959 and began his literary career in his late thirties with short stories including The Road (გზა, 1962), My Ragger Uncle (ჩემი მეჯღანე ბიძა, 1963), The Bull’s Confession (ხარის აღსარება, 1964) and Giorgi Burduli (გიორგი ბურდული, 1965).

== Fame ==
Amirejibi's most famous novel and one of the best works in modern Georgian literature, Data Tutashkhia (დათა თუთაშხია, 1971-5), achieved sensational success for the magazine Tsiskari and fame for the writer himself. Conceived during Amirejibi’s years in prison, it was only through the intervention of the contemporary Georgian Communist Party chief Eduard Shevardnadze that this substantial novel of over 700 pages passed the Soviet censors and was published.

The novel is the story of Data Tutashkhia, a fictional Georgian outlaw of the Imperial Russian period, a very popular theme in Georgian literature. The story is narrated by a Russian gendarme, Count Szeged, who frequently passes the story-telling on to other characters.

The work follows the life of Tutashkhia as he spends years eluding capture by the Tsarist police, combining thrilling escapades with Dostoevskian dealings with the fate of an individual and national soul. The police are led by Data's cousin, his detached and imperturbable double, Mushni Zarandia. The book, and the feature film based on it, turned Tutaskhia into an iconic hero, widely popular in Georgia.

== Later career ==
Amirejibi hailed the newly independent Georgia, and was elected to its Parliament from 1992 to 1995. In 1992 he was rewarded with the prestigious Shota Rustaveli State Prize. Amirejibi was decorated with the highest civil orders of Georgia and several Russian and international literary awards.

However, the tragic years of civil war and the death of his eldest son Irakli in the War in Abkhazia in 1992 heavily affected the writer. Therefore, it came as a real surprise in 1995 when Amirejibi published his next major novel, Gora Mborgali (გორა მბორგალი, literally meaning "frenzied" or "infuriating"), begun in 1978, and based on the author's experiences in Soviet prisons. His last work, George the Brilliant (გიორგი ბრწყინვალე), a historical novel about the 14th-century Georgian king preaching national pride, appeared in 2005.

Amirejibi briefly returned to politics in July 2009, when he joined the movement daitsavi sakartvelo ("Defend Georgia"), allied with the opposition to President Mikheil Saakashvili's government. On November 16, 2010, he was consecrated as a Georgian Orthodox monk under the name of David. Due to his health condition, the ceremony was conducted at the writer's own apartment.

== Bibliography ==
- The Road (collected stories) 1962
- My Ragger Uncle (collected stories) 1963
- The Bull’s Confession (collected stories) 1964
- Giorgi Burduli (Novel) 1965
- Data Tutashkhia (novel) 1973-1975
- Gora Mborgali (Novel) 1984-1994
- George the Brilliant (Novel) 2003
