= Franklinella =

Franklinella Temporal range: Devonian-Permian

Scientific classification
- Kingdom: Animalia
- Phylum: Arthropoda
- Clade: Pancrustacea
- Class: Ostracoda
- Order: Myodocopida
- Family: †Rhomboentomozoidae
- Genus: †Franklinella

Extinct genus of crustaceans

Franklinella is an extinct genus of crustaceans of the class of the ostracods (seed shrimp).

== Species ==
- Franklinella calcarata (Richter, 1856) Pribyl, 1950 †
- Franklinella curvata Kupfahl, 1956 †
- Franklinella septecosta Stewart & Hendrix, 1945 †
