= Deeveyidae =

Scientific classification
- Kingdom: Animalia
- Phylum: Arthropoda
- Clade: Pancrustacea
- Class: Ostracoda
- Order: Halocyprida
- Family: Deeveyidae; Kornicker & Iliffe, 1985

Family of crustaceans

Deeveyidae is a family of ostracods belonging to the order Halocyprida.

Genera:

- Deeveya Kornicker & Iliffe, 1985
- Spelaeoecia Angel & Iliffe, 1987
