= Praemacrocypris =

Scientific classification
- Kingdom: Animalia
- Phylum: Arthropoda
- Clade: Pancrustacea
- Class: Ostracoda
- Order: Podocopida
- Family: Macrocyprididae
- Genus: †Praemacrocypris; Kozur, 1971

Genus of ostracods

Praemacrocypris is an extinct genus of ostracods in the family Macrocyprididae described by Heinz Kozur in 1971. No Individual species have been described.
