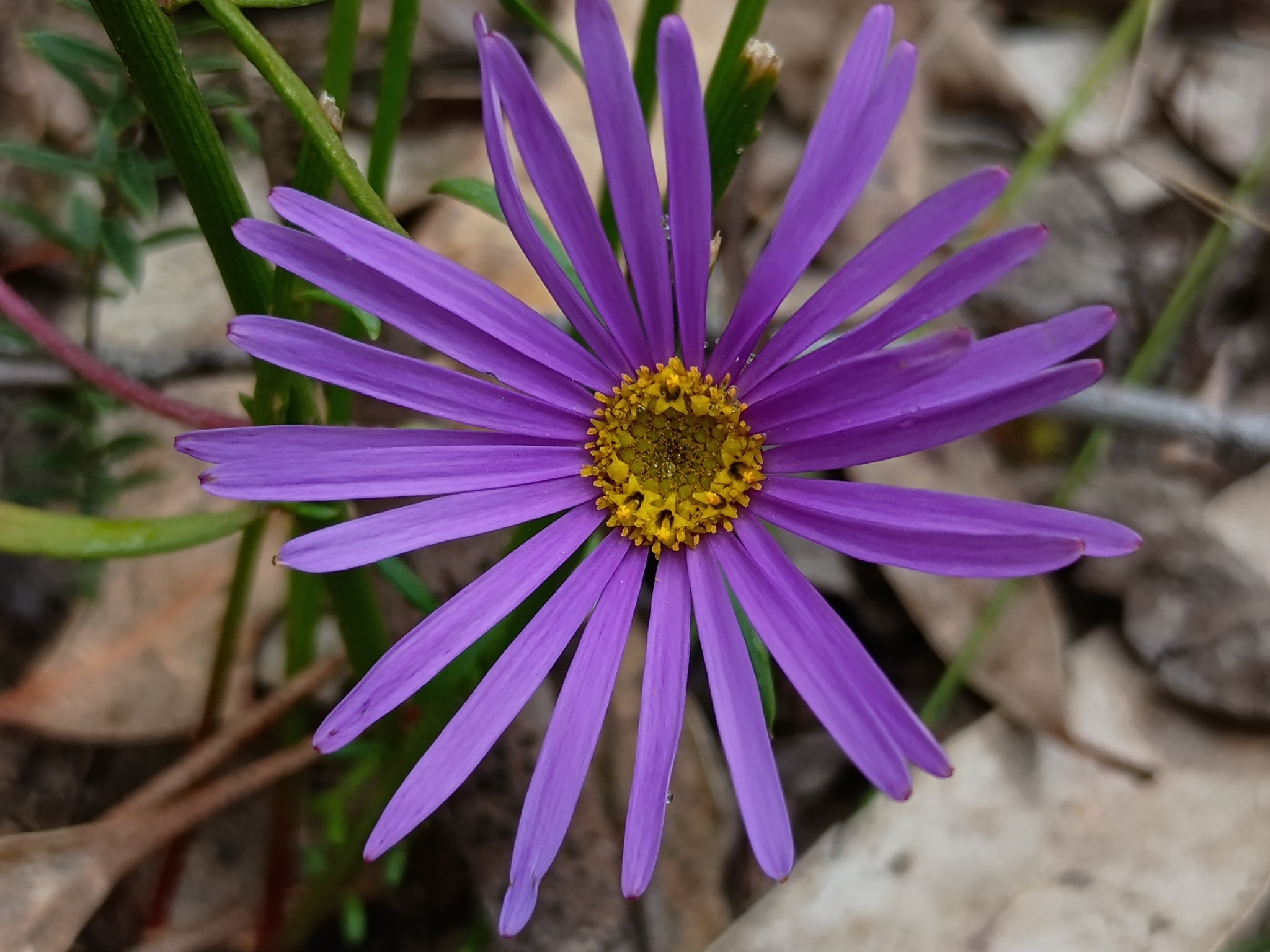
- Vicinia ciliata

Scientific classification
- Kingdom: Plantae
- Clade: Embryophytes
- Clade: Tracheophytes
- Clade: Spermatophytes
- Clade: Angiosperms
- Clade: Eudicots
- Clade: Asterids
- Order: Asterales
- Family: Asteraceae
- Subfamily: Asteroideae
- Tribe: Astereae
- Subtribe: Brachyscominae
- Genus: Vicinia; G.L.Nesom

Species
- Vicinia ciliata (Benth.) G.L.Nesom; Vicinia squamifolia (F.Muell.) G.L.Nesom

= Vicinia =

Genus of flowering plants

Vicinia is a genus of flowering plants in the family Asteraceae. It includes two species native to eastern and southern Australia.

- Vicinia ciliata (Benth.) G.L.Nesom
- Vicinia squamifolia (F.Muell.) G.L.Nesom
