= Macrocyprina =

Scientific classification
- Kingdom: Animalia
- Phylum: Arthropoda
- Clade: Pancrustacea
- Class: Ostracoda
- Order: Podocopida
- Family: Macrocyprididae
- Genus: Macrocyprina; Triebel, 1960

Type species
- Macrocyprina propinqua

Genus of ostracods

Macrocyprina is a genus of ostracods in the family Macrocyprididae described by Erich Triebel in 1960.

== Species ==
The following species are recognized:

- Macrocyprina africana Müller, 1908
- Macrocyprina barbara Maddocks, 1990
- Macrocyprina belizensis Maddocks, 1990
- Macrocyprina bermudae Maddocks, 1990
- Macrocyprina bonaducei Maddocks, 1990
- Macrocyprina caiman Maddocks, 1990
- Macrocyprina campbelli Jellinek & Swanson, 2003
- Macrocyprina captiosa Maddocks, 1990
- Macrocyprina dispar Müller, 1908
- Macrocyprina gracilis Brady, 1890
- Macrocyprina hartmanni Maddocks, 1990
- Macrocyprina hortuli Maddocks, 1990
- Macrocyprina jamaicae Maddocks, 1990
- Macrocyprina madagascarensis Maddocks, 1990
- Macrocyprina maddocksae Brandão, 2004
- Macrocyprina moza Maddocks, 1990
- Macrocyprina noharai Maddocks, 1990
- Macrocyprina okinawae Maddocks, 1990
- Macrocyprina okinneri Kontrovitz, 1976
- †Macrocyprina pacifica Le Roy, 1943
- Macrocyprina parcens Maddocks, 1990
- Macrocyprina propinqua Triebel, 1960
- Macrocyprina quadrimaculata Maddocks, 1990
- Macrocyprina rattrayi Whatley, Jones & Wouters, 2000
- Macrocyprina schmitti Tressler, 1949
- Macrocyprina skinneri Kontrovitz, 1976
- Macrocyprina succinea (Müller, 1894)
- Macrocyprina swaini Maddocks, 1990
- Macrocyprina vargata Allison & Holden, 1971
