= Varlam Urdia =

Soviet bomber and fighter pilot

- ვარლამ ურდია
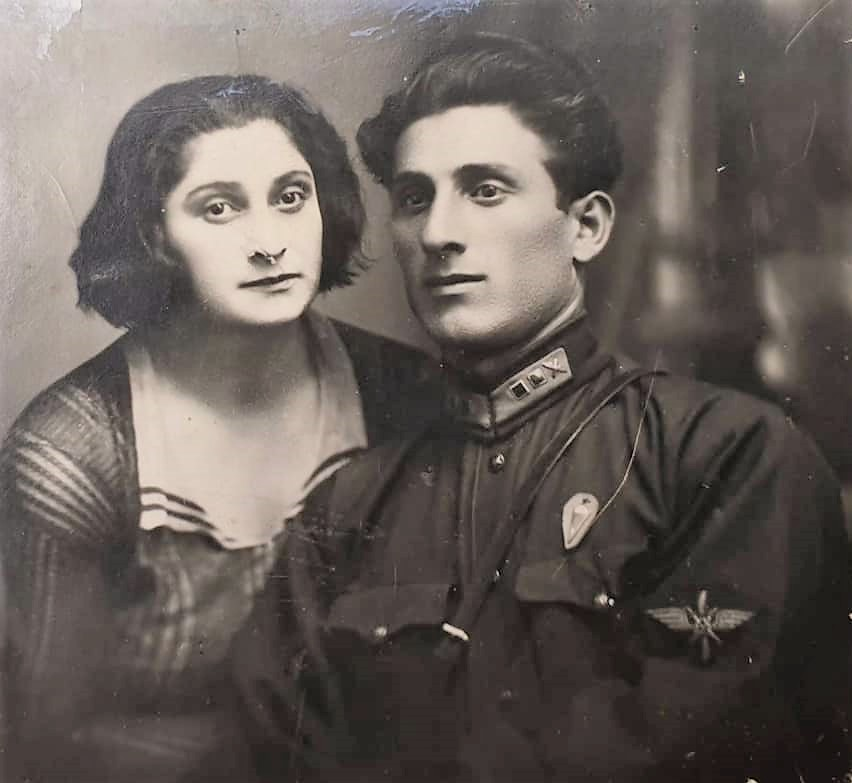
- Varlam Urdia with his wife Mariam Gogoladze in Zaporozhie, Ukrainian SSR, 1934.
- Born: 15 September 1906; Vedidkari, Martvili Municipality, Russian Empire
- Died: 30 October 1945 (aged 39); Soviet Union
- Military career
- Allegiance: Soviet Union
- Branch: Soviet Air Force
- Service years: 1924–1945
- Units: Grozny Military Flight School of Rifle Bombardiers, 275th Fighter Aviation Regiment, North Caucasus Military District of the Soviet Air Forces, 101st Fighter Aviation Regiment of the Air Defence Division.
- Conflicts: World War II; Invasion of Poland; Winter War; Eastern Front
- Awards: Order of the Patriotic War (1st class)

Varlam Urdia (Georgian: ვარლამ ურდია; 15 September 1906 – 30 October 1945) was a Soviet bomber and fighter pilot of Georgian origin who took part in numerous bombing campaigns and aerial dogfight battles against the German Luftwaffe during the World War II. He took an active part in the bombing raids of German positions on the Voronezh Front by piloting PS-84 and Ilyushin Il-2 ground attack fighter aircraft during the Operation Barbarossa and in aerial battles on the Caucasus front. For his service in 1942-43, Colonel Urdia was awarded twice with the Order of the Patriotic War 1st Class and in 1944 with the Order of the Red Banner for extraordinary heroism and courage demonstrated on the battlefield.

== Early career ==
Urdia was born on September 15, 1906, in the small town of Vedidkari in the western part of Georgia. After seven years in the military service of the Red Army he was admitted to the 11th School of Military Pilots (also known as Voroshilovgrad Military Aviation School) in Ukrainian SSR where he qualified as a military pilot. From 1933, he relocated with his family to Uman and served in various aviation units, progressing from a junior pilot to the rank of Air Force Major. In Uman he worked as the flight instructor at the 202nd Training Airbase (202-я учебная авиабаза) and held training exercises for the military pilots at the Zaporozhie Technical College of Aviation (Запорожский авиационный техникум) until 1938.

Urdia gained his first combat experience as the fighter pilot during the Soviet invasion of Poland in September 1939 at the battle of Grodno against the Polish units under General Wacław Przeździecki. During the same year on December 20, 1939, Urdia was transferred to the military air base of Lodeynoye Pole in the squadron of 275th Fighter Aviation Regiment where he took part in the air raids on the Finnish army positions during the Soviet aggression against Finland. In the course of the war, the Soviet command used the fighter aviation units to support the advance of the Red Army infantry and carry out the bombing raids on supply trains behind the Finnish defence lines. On May 19, 1940, Urdia was awarded with the Order of the Red Star and promoted to the rank of lieutenant colonel for his role in the war against Finland. Before the outbreak of the Second World War, Urdia was briefly posted in the North Caucasus to train as the bomber pilot in Chechnya at the newly established Grozny Military Flight School of Rifle Bombardiers (Грозненская военная авиационная школа стрелков-бомбардиров) located on the small airbase near the city of Grozny.

== World War II ==
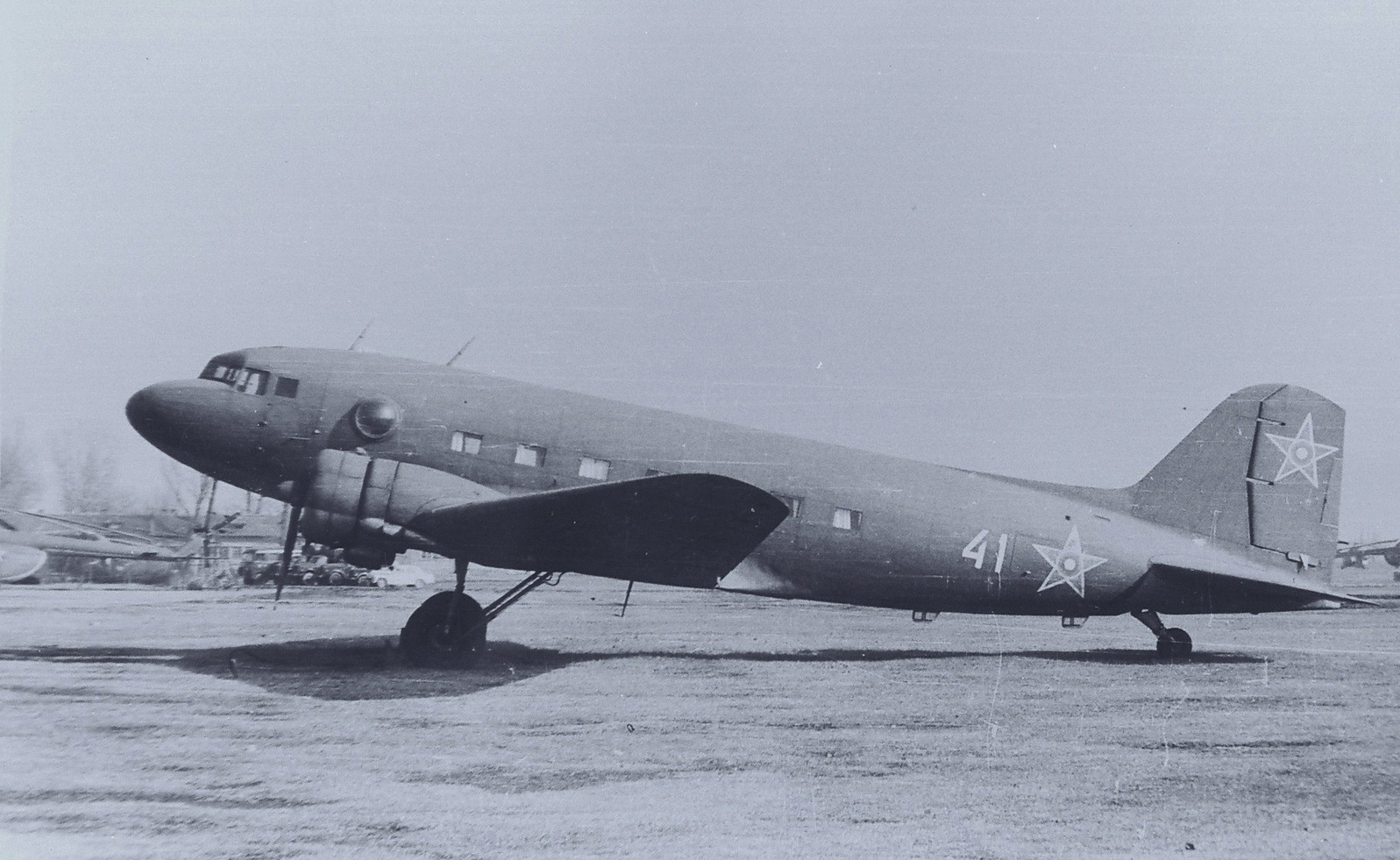
Soviet PS-84 plane in 1941

At the onset of the German attack on the Soviet Union in July 1941, Urdia was deployed to the warfront within newly formed 101st Fighter Aviation Regiment of the Air Defence Division (101-я истребительная авиационная дивизия). In the 101st regiment Urdia was assigned to the squadron of PS-84 bomber aircraft on the Voronezh Front during the Soviet effort to repel the German advance on the city of Voronezh which was a gateway to Hitler's main objective of Stalingrad. The PS-84 aircraft had flown with Aeroflot as a passenger plane but since the outbreak of the war it was primary used in military operations. The aircraft was renamed to Lisunov Li-2 in 1942 and equipped with a 12.7 mm (.50 in) UBK heavy machine gun and used for supply transportation and aerial bombing. The newly remodeled plane was able to carry smaller bombs inside its fuselage which were released from the freight hatch by the crew. However, its ability to maneuver inflight was limited and vulnerable to the anti bomber attacks by the German Messerschmitt Me 262 fighters with its roller-coaster aerial tactics. Between March and December 1942, Urdia flew PS-84/Li-2 aircraft for more than eleven nighttime bombing raids on German positions targeting artillery batteries, infantry dugouts and supply lines. His nighttime bombing raids were successful in inflicting losses on the motorized units of the Wehrmacht.

For his role in the bombing raids on enemy positions has earned him the Order of the Patriotic War First Class and promotion to the rank of colonel. By the end of August 1942, Urdia flew number of missions on the Li-2 aircraft to supply the Soviet troops and continue aerial assaults on Wehrmacht's 6th Army which has reached Voronezh during the early stages of Operation Blau. The primary aim of the commander of 101st division Major general Ivan Evsevev was to provide air cover for the Soviet ground troops during their counterattack on Stalingrad in October 1942.

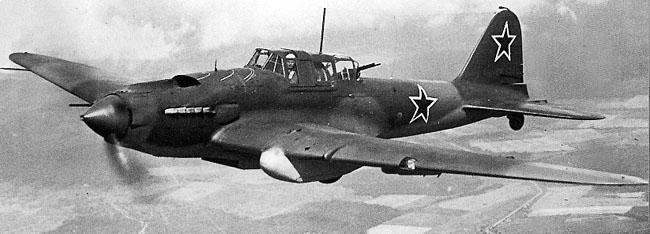
Ilyushin Il-2 ground attack aircraft (Shturmovik), 1943

In September 1942, Evsevev was reassigned to command the 8th Fighter Aviation Corpus of the Anti-Aircraft Defence (8-й истребительный авиационный корпус ПВО) in the Battle of the Caucasus where the German forces launched the Operation Edelweiss to reach the Baku oil fields. In December, Evsevev transferred Urdia and other highly skilled pilots to the Caucasus where the situation was volatile as the German 4th Mountain Division of the Army Group A made territorial gains in the midst of anti-Soviet insurgency by the Chechen resistance under the leadership of Khasan Israilov. However, after the German defeat in Stalingrad the Wehrmacht began to retreat and establish a defensive line known as Kuban bridgehead in the Taman Peninsula from where the German command planned another attack on the Caucasus in order to finish the objective of capturing Baku. In April–July 1943, the German Luftwaffe began a massive aerial assault over the Taman Peninsula in an attempt gain air superiority and provide cover support for German troops on the defence line.

During the air battle of Kuban on the North Caucasus front where more than 2,000 aircraft from both sides engaged in one of the largest aerial battles of the war, Urdia was reassigned to piloting of ground-attack aircraft (Sturmovik) Ilyushin Il-2. In the series of large scale aerial battles, Soviet aircraft including Urdia's Ilyushin Il-2 were confronted by Messerschmitt 109 fighters, Junkers Ju 87, Heinkel He 111 and twin-engined multirole combat aircraft Junkers Ju 88s. In the course of the entire battle the Soviets lost more than 1100 aircraft while German air-to-air combat losses were much lower. However by July 1943, the Luftwaffe was exhausted and no longer able to withstand the countless counteroffensive measures by the Soviets halted its attack, hence ending the battle and finally losing the objective of gaining air superiority over the entire region. For his role in the Kuban air battle Urdia was awarded with the Order of the Patriotic War First Class for the second time and went on flying Ilyushin Il-2 attacking 1st Panzer Army and Luftwaffe bombers which were providing air cover for the retreating SS divisions.

In October 1943, Urdia was assigned to the North Caucasus Military District of the Soviet Air Forces (Краснознамённый Северо-Кавказский военный округ) but the details of his service and whereabouts from November 1943 is unknown. According to the archival documents on November 3, 1944, Urdia received the Order of the Red Banner for extraordinary heroism, dedication, and courage demonstrated on the battlefield.

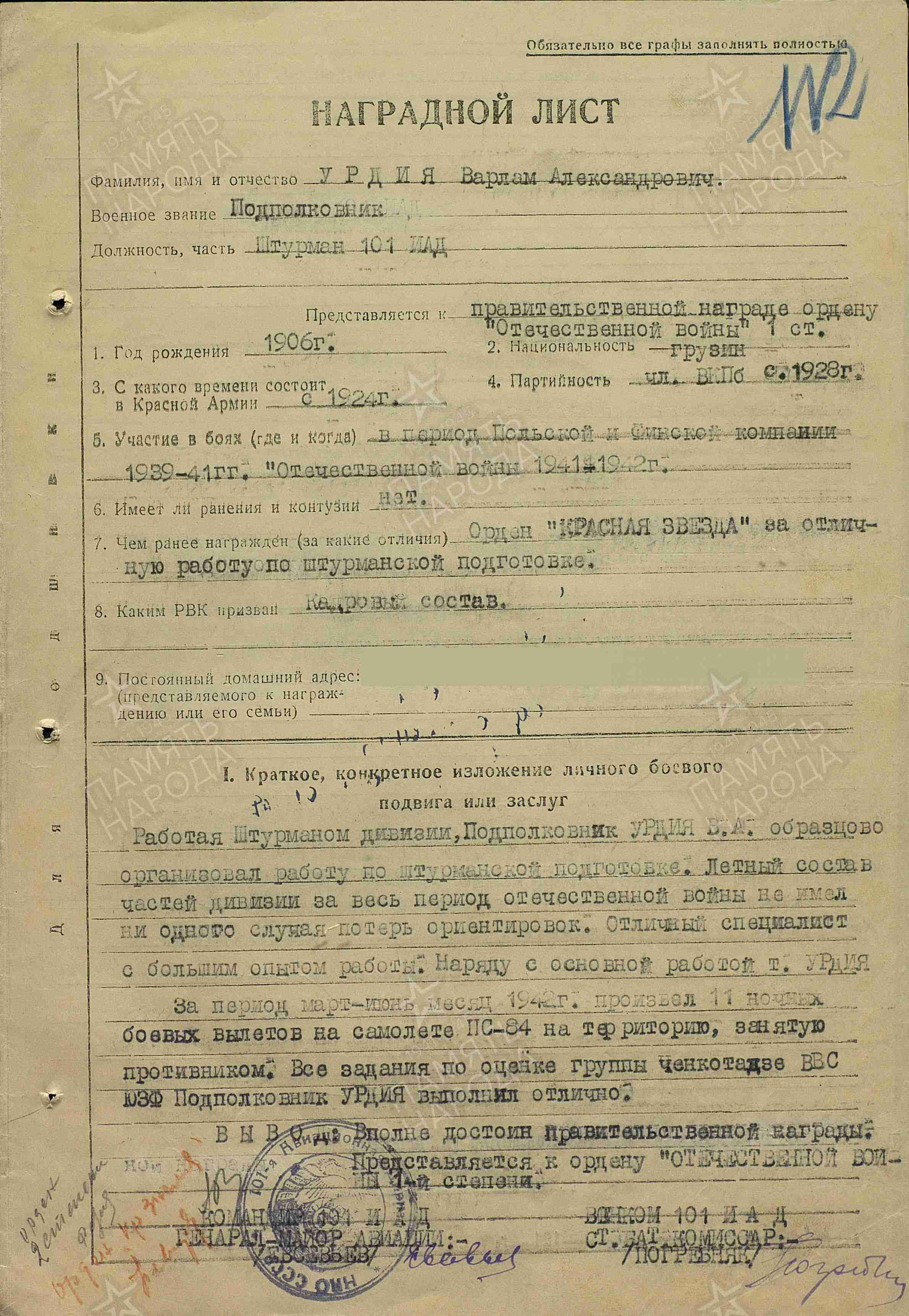
Official award order of Varlam Urdia in 1942

== Death ==
The circumstances behind the death of Varlam Urdia remain unknown. On October 30, 1945, Urdia was killed during the mid-air explosion on his plane in Western Ukraine. The official Soviet document on the military loses among the officers of the Fighter Aviation Division after May 9, 1945 (Список офиcерного состава Истребителной Авиаcии ПВО страни погибших после 9 Mая 1945 г.) only states that Urdia was killed.

Urdia's wife Mariam Gogoladze returned to her native Georgia with their two daughters and son Anzor Urdia, who would later become a well-known Georgian theater and film actor.

== Orders and decorations ==
Urdia received the following orders and decorations:

- Order of the Red Star (19.05.1940)
- Order of the Patriotic War (1st class – 13.06.1942)
- Order of the Patriotic War (1st class – 14.02.1943)
- Order of the Red Banner (03.11.1944)

== See also ==
- Anzor Urdia, Varlam Urdia's son
- Winter War
- Battle of the Caucasus
- Georgians in World War II
- Air army (Soviet Union)
