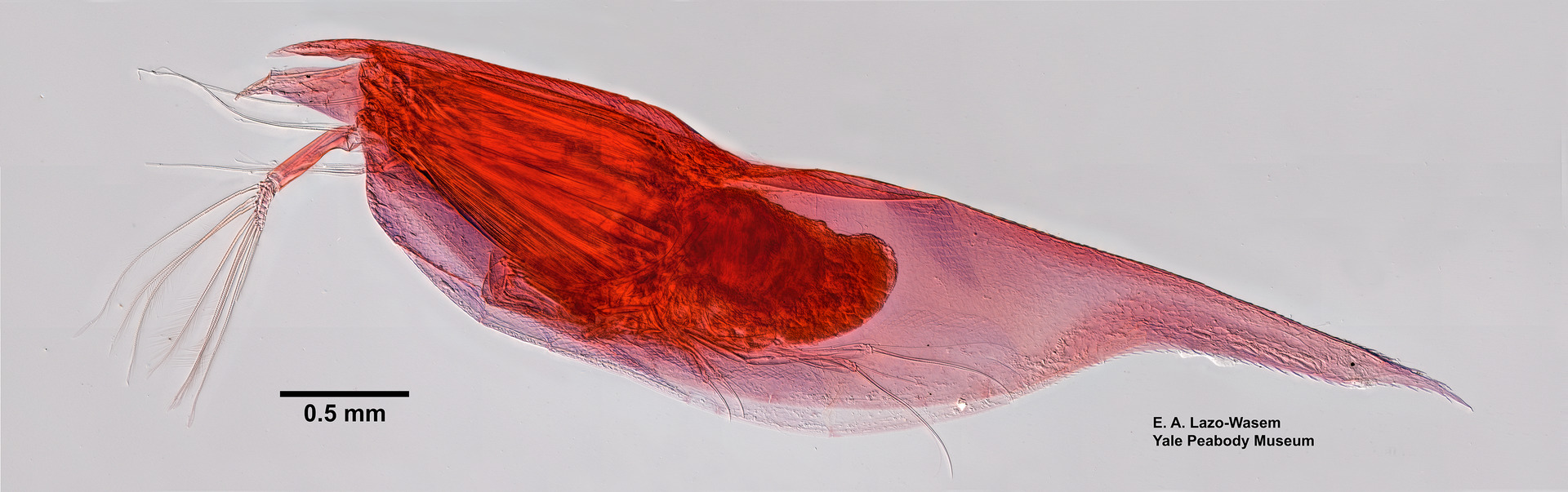
- Conchoecilla daphnoides

Scientific classification
- Kingdom: Animalia
- Phylum: Arthropoda
- Clade: Pancrustacea
- Class: Ostracoda
- Order: Halocyprida; Dana, 1853

Suborders and Families
- Suborder Cladocopina Sars, 1866; Suborder †Entomozocopina Gründel, 1969; Suborder Halocypridina Skogsberg, 1920; Family Entomoconchoidae; Family †Entomozoidae Přibyl, 1951; Family †Rhomboentomozoidae Gründel, 1920

= Halocyprida =

Order of seed shrimps

Halocyprida is an order of ostracods and one of the two orders within the Myodocopa. Like their relatives in the order Myodocopida, they have a long exopod on the second antenna. However, unlike myodocopids, their fifth appendage is leg-like rather than modified for feeding, their seventh limb is reduced or absent, and they have no lateral eyes. The group is primarily planktonic. There are two suborders: Halocypridina and Cladocopina.
