= 2016 in arthropod paleontology =

This list of fossil arthropods described in 2016 is a list of new taxa of trilobites, fossil insects, crustaceans, arachnids and other fossil arthropods of every kind that have been described during the year 2016, as well as other significant discoveries and events related to arthropod paleontology that occurred in the year 2016.

== Arachnids ==
=== Research ===
- A study on the phylogenetic relationships of the Eocene tick Ixodes succineus is published by Dunlop et al. (2016).
- A study on the phylogenetic relationships of the Carboniferous species Archaeometa nephilina and Arachnometa tuberculata is published by Selden, Dunlop & Garwood (2016), who interpret these taxa as harvestmen rather than spiders.

=== New taxa ===
| Name | Novelty | Status | Authors | Age | Unit | Location | Notes | Images |
|---|---|---|---|---|---|---|---|---|
| Aenigmatarbus | Gen. et sp. nov | Valid | Poschmann et al. | Carboniferous (late Gzhelian) | | France | A member of Trigonotarbida of uncertain phylogenetic placement. The type species is Aenigmatarbus rasteli. | |
| Afronothrus ornosae | Sp. nov | Valid | Arillo, Subías & Sánchez-García | Early Cretaceous | | Spain | An oribatid mite, a species of Afronothrus. | |
| Archaeoananteroides | Gen. et sp. nov | Valid | Lourenço & Velten | Cretaceous | Burmese amber | Myanmar | A scorpion belonging to the family Buthidae. The type species is A. maderai. | |
| Betaburmesebuthus bellus | Sp. nov | Valid | Lourenço | Early Cretaceous | Burmese amber | Myanmar | A scorpion belonging to the superfamily Buthoidea and the family Palaeoburmesebuthidae. | Betaburmesebuthus bellus |
| Betaburmesebuthus fleissneri | Sp. nov | Valid | Lourenço & Velten | Cretaceous | Burmese amber | Myanmar | A scorpion belonging to the superfamily Buthoidea and the family Palaeoburmesebuthidae. | |
| Betaburmesebuthus larafleissnerae | Sp. nov | Valid | Lourenço & Velten | Cretaceous | Burmese amber | Myanmar | A scorpion belonging to the superfamily Buthoidea and the family Palaeoburmesebuthidae. | |
| Burmesescorpiops | Gen. et sp. nov | Valid | Lourenço | Early Cretaceous | Burmese amber | Myanmar | A scorpion belonging to the family Palaeoeuscorpiidae and the subfamily Archaeoscorpiopinae. The type species is Burmesescorpiops groehni. | |
| Calyptostoma katyae | Sp. nov | Valid | Konikiewicz, Wohltmann & Mąkol | Eocene | Baltic amber | Europe (Baltic Sea coast) | A mite belonging to the group Prostigmata, a species of Calyptostoma. | |
| Carbolohmannia | Gen. et sp. nov | Valid | Robin et al. | Carboniferous (ca. 320 mya) | | China | An oribatid mite belonging to the group Mixonomata. The type species is Carbolohmannia maimaiphilus. | |
| Chaerilobuthus gigantosternum | Sp. nov | Valid | Lourenço | Early Cretaceous | Burmese amber | Myanmar | A scorpion belonging to the family Chaerilobuthidae; a species of Chaerilobuthus. | |
| Chaerilobuthus serratus | Sp. nov | Valid | Lourenço | Early Cretaceous | Burmese amber | Myanmar | A scorpion belonging to the family Chaerilobuthidae; a species of Chaerilobuthus. | |
| Cheletomimus (Hemicheyletia) crinitus | Sp. nov | Valid | Bochkov & Sidorchuk | Eocene | Baltic amber | Baltic Sea coast, most likely Russia (Kaliningrad Oblast) | A mite belonging to the family Cheyletidae, a species of Cheletomimus. | |
| Electroblemma | Gen. et sp. nov | Valid | Selden, Zhang & Ren | Late Cretaceous (Cenomanian) | Burmese amber | Myanmar | A member of Tetrablemmidae. The type species is E. bifida. | |
| Electrokoenenia | Gen. et sp. nov | Valid | Engel & Huang in Engel et al. | Late Cretaceous (Cenomanian) | | Myanmar | A microwhip scorpion. The type species is Electrokoenenia yaksha. | |
| Hypovertex hispanicus | Sp. nov | Valid | Arillo, Subías & Sánchez-García | Early Cretaceous | | Spain | An oribatid mite, a species of Hypovertex. | |
| Idmonarachne | Gen. et sp. nov | Valid | Garwood et al. | Carboniferous (Gzhelian) | | France | A member of Arachnida of uncertain phylogenetic placement, probably closely related to spiders. The type species is Idmonarachne brasieri. | |
| Kronocharon prendinii adornellae | Subsp. nov | Valid | Rossi & Merendino | Cretaceous | Burmese amber | Myanmar | A whip spider. | |
| Nothrus vazquezae | Sp. nov | Valid | Arillo, Subías & Sánchez-García | Early Cretaceous | | Spain | An oribatid mite, a species of Nothrus. | |
| ?Opsieobuthus tungeri | Sp. nov | Valid | Dunlop et al. | Early Permian (Sakmarian) | Leukersdorf Formation | Germany | A scorpion belonging to the family Centromachidae; possibly a species of Opsieobuthus. | |
| Parageralinura marsiglioi | Sp. nov | Valid | Selden, Dunlop & Simonetto | Carboniferous (Kasimovian–Gzhelian) | Probably Pizzul Formation | Italy | A member of Uropygi, a species of Parageralinura. | |
| Paraliochthonius miomaya | Sp. nov | Valid | Judson | Miocene | | Mexico | A pseudoscorpion belonging to the family Chthoniidae; a species of Paraliochthonius. | |
| Petrobunoides | Gen. et sp. nov | Valid | Selden et al. | Late Cretaceous (early Cenomanian) | Burmese amber | Myanmar | A member of Opiliones belonging to the family Epedanidae. The type species is Petrobunoides sharmai. | |
| Platyliodes sellnicki | Sp. nov | Valid | Arillo, Subías & Sánchez-García | Early Cretaceous | | Spain | An oribatid mite, a species of Platyliodes. | |
| Porttrombidium gedanense | Sp. nov | Valid | Konikiewicz, Sontag & Mąkol | Eocene (Lutetian) | Baltic amber | Russia (Kaliningrad Oblast) | A mite belonging to the group Parasitengona and the family Microtrombidiidae. | |
| Protofeaella | Gen. et sp. nov | Valid | Henderickx in Henderickx & Boone | Late Cretaceous (Cenomanian) | Burmese amber | Myanmar | A pseudoscorpion. Originally classified as a member of the family Feaellidae; Wolfe et al. (2016) only considered it to be a likely member of the pseudoscorpion crown group, probably a feaelloid. The type species is P. peetersae. | |
| Rhopalurus renelauerae | Sp. nov | Valid | Lourenço in Lourenço & Velten | Miocene | Dominican amber | Dominican Republic | A scorpion belonging to the family Buthidae, a species of Rhopalurus. | |
| Tenuelamellarea estefaniae | Sp. nov | Valid | Arillo, Subías & Sánchez-García | Early Cretaceous | | Spain | An oribatid mite, a species of Tenuelamellarea. | |

== Crustaceans ==
=== Research ===
- Mesoprosopon triasinum is reinterpreted as a eumalacostracan larva by Hyžný, Haug & Haug (2016).
- A study on the phylogenetic relationships of members of the genus Tealliocaris is published by Jones et al. (2016).
- A study on the phylogenetic relationships of Antrimpos speciosus, indicating it was closely related to shrimps belonging to the genera Farfantepenaeus, Litopenaeus, Fenneropenaeus, Penaeus, Marsupenaeus and Melicertus, is published by Robalino et al. (2016).
- A study on the shapes and sizes of eyes and ommatidia of Jurassic polychelidans is published by Audo et al. (2016).
- New anatomical data on Hesslandona ventrospinata and Hesslandona angustata is published by Eriksson et al. (2016).
- Early Miocene harpacticoid copepods belonging to five families (Canthocamptidae, Cletodidae, Darcythompsoniidae, Ectinosomatidae and Laophontidae) are described from Chiapas amber (Mexico) by Huys et al. (2016).
- Fossil ephippia of members of the daphniid genus Ceriodaphnia are described from the Early Cretaceous (Aptian) Koonwarra Fossil Bed (Strzelecki Group; Victoria, Australia) by Hegna & Kotov (2016).

=== New taxa ===
==== Malacostracans ====
| Name | Novelty | Status | Authors | Age | Unit | Location | Notes | Images |
|---|---|---|---|---|---|---|---|---|
| Acanthodromia zannatoi | Sp. nov | Valid | Beschin et al. | Eocene (Ypresian) | | Italy | A crab belonging to the family Dynomenidae. | |
| Acanthogalathea broglioi | Sp. nov | Valid | Beschin et al. | Eocene (Ypresian) | | Italy | A member of Galatheidae. | |
| Acanthogalathea devecchii | Sp. nov | Valid | Beschin et al. | Eocene (Ypresian) | | Italy | A member of Galatheidae. | |
| Acanthogalathea paucispinosa | Sp. nov | Valid | Beschin et al. | Eocene (Ypresian) | | Italy | A member of Galatheidae. | |
| Aetocarcinus | Gen. et comb. et sp. nov | Valid | Schweitzer et al. | Early Cretaceous (Albian) | Glen Rose Formation | United States | A member of Raninoida belonging to the family Orithopsidae. The type species is "Diaulax" roddai Bishop (1983); genus also includes new species Aetocarcinus muricatus. | |
| Alponella | Gen. et sp. nov | Valid | Beschin et al. | Eocene (Ypresian) | | Italy | A crab belonging to the superfamily Goneplacoidea and the family Euryplacidae. The type species is A. paleogenica. | |
| Amekicarcinus | Gen. et sp. nov | Valid | Schweitzer, Odumodu & Feldmann | Eocene | | Nigeria | A crab. Genus includes new species A. enigmaticus. | |
| Arcantitanais | Gen. et sp. nov | Valid | Sánchez-García et al. | Cretaceous (Albian–Cenomanian) | Charentese amber | France | A member of Tanaidacea of uncertain phylogenetic placement. The type species is A. turpis. | |
| Arcticocarcinus | Gen. et comb. nov | Valid | Schweitzer et al. | Paleocene (Danian) | | Denmark | A crab belonging to the group Raninoida and the family Necrocarcinidae. A new genus for "Necrocarcinus" insignis Segerberg (1900). | |
| Armadillopsis | Gen. et sp. nov | Valid | Sánchez-García et al. | Late Cretaceous (Cenomanian) | Pyrenean amber | France | A member of Tanaidacea of uncertain phylogenetic placement. The type species is A. rara. | |
| Atherfieldastacus | Gen. et comb. nov | Valid | Simpson in Robin et al. | Early Cretaceous | Atherfield Clay Formation | Colombia; Germany; Mexico; South Africa; Spain; United Kingdom | A member of Glypheoidea belonging to the family Mecochiridae. The type species is "Meyeria" magna M'Coy (1849); genus also includes Atherfieldastacus mexicanus (Rathbun, 1935), Atherfieldastacus rapax (Harbort, 1905) and Atherfieldastacus schwartzi (Kitchin,1908) . | |
| Aulavescus paintenensis | Sp. nov | Valid | Feldmann et al. | Late Jurassic | | Germany | A munidopsid galatheoid, a species of Aulavescus. | |
| Barapseudia | Gen. et sp. nov | Valid | Quayle | Eocene | Barton Clay Formation | United Kingdom | A member of Tanaidacea belonging to the family Apseudidae. The type species is Barapseudia prima. | |
| Basadromia | Gen. et sp. nov | Valid | Artal et al. | Eocene (Priabonian) | | Spain | A member of Dromioidea, possibly a member of the family Dromiidae. The type species is Basadromia longifrons. | |
| Bathynomus kominatoensis | Sp. nov | Valid | Kato, Kurihara & Tokita | Late Miocene | Amatsu Formation | Japan | A giant isopod. | |
| Biohermia | Gen. et sp. nov | Valid | Beschin et al. | Eocene (Ypresian) | | Italy | A crab belonging to the superfamily Homolodromioidea and the family Goniodromitidae. The type species is B. chalmasi. | |
| Bittnereus depressus | Sp. nov | Valid | Beschin et al. | Eocene (Ypresian) | | Italy | A crab belonging to the family Panopeidae. | |
| Bittnereus tumidus | Sp. nov | Valid | Beschin et al. | Eocene (Ypresian) | | Italy | A crab belonging to the family Panopeidae. | |
| Bittnerilia granosa | Sp. nov | Valid | Beschin et al. | Eocene (Lutetian) | | Italy | A crab belonging to the family Parthenopidae. | |
| Bolcagalathea | Gen. et 3 sp. nov | Valid | Beschin et al. | Eocene (Ypresian) | | Italy | A member of Galatheidae. The type species is B. corallina; genus also includes B. venetica and B. multispinosa. | |
| Bolcapisa | Gen. et sp. nov | Valid | Beschin et al. | Eocene (Ypresian) | | Italy | A crab belonging to the family Epialtidae. The type species is B. giulianae. | |
| Braggilambrus | Gen. et sp. nov | Valid | De Angeli & Caporiondo | Eocene (Ypresian) | | Italy | A crab belonging to the family Parthenopidae. The type species is B. tani. | |
| Branchioplax cordata | Sp. nov | Valid | Beschin et al. | Eocene (Ypresian) | | Italy | A crab belonging to the family Mathildellidae. | |
| Bylgia anjobea | Sp. nov | Valid | Winkler | Late Jurassic | Painten Formation | Germany | A member of Penaeidae, a species of Bylgia. | |
| Calappilia calculosa | Sp. nov | Valid | Rumsey, Klompmaker & Portell | Late Eocene to early Oligocene | | United States | A member of Calappidae, a species of Calappilia. | |
| Caporiondolus | Gen. et sp. nov | Valid | De Angeli | Eocene (Priabonian) | | Italy | A crab belonging to the group Cyclodorippoida and the family Cymonomidae. The type species is Caporiondolus bericus. | |
| Catillogalathea | Gen. et 3 sp. nov | Valid | Robins et al. | Late Jurassic | | Austria; Romania | A member of Galatheoidea. The type species is Catillogalathea falcula; genus also includes Catillogalathea patruliusi and Catillogalathea purcarenensis | |
| Ceratiocaris winneshiekensis | Sp. nov | Valid | Briggs et al. | Ordovician (Darriwilian) | Winneshiek Lagerstätte | United States | | |
| Charbelicaris | Gen. et sp. nov | Valid | Haug et al. | Late Cretaceous (Cenomanian) | Hadjoula Lagerstätte | Lebanon | A member of Achelata. The type species is Charbelicaris maronites. | |
| Corallioplax | Gen. et sp. nov | Valid | Beschin et al. | Eocene (Ypresian) | | Italy | A crab belonging to the superfamily Goneplacoidea and the family Euryplacidae. The type species is C. exigua. | |
| Costacopluma mamethioupamei | Sp. nov | Valid | Hyžný et al. | Late Cretaceous (Maastrichtian) | Cap de Naze Formation | Senegal | A retroplumid crab, a species of Costacopluma. | |
| Cracchidynomene | Gen. et sp. nov | Valid | Beschin et al. | Eocene (Ypresian) | | Italy | A crab belonging to the family Dynomenidae. The type species is C. areolata. | |
| Dardanus bayani | Sp. nov | Valid | Beschin et al. | Eocene (Ypresian) | | Italy | A species of Dardanus. | |
| Dardanus colosseus | Sp. nov | Valid | Fraaije & Polkowsky | Eocene | | Austria | A hermit crab, a species of Dardanus. | |
| Dardanus suessi | Sp. nov | Valid | Beschin et al. | Eocene (Ypresian) | | Italy | A species of Dardanus. | |
| Discutiolira | Gen. et comb. nov | Valid | Robins et al. | Late Jurassic | | Austria; Czech Republic; Poland; Romania | A member of Galatheoidea. The type species is "Galathea" eutecta Moericke (1899); genus also includes "Galathea" moesica Muţiu & Bădăluţă (1971). | |
| Disipia | Gen. et sp. nov | Valid | Beschin et al. | Eocene (Ypresian) | | Italy | A porcelain crab. The type species is D. sorbinii. | |
| Dromilites montenati | Sp. nov | Valid | Robin et al. | Paleocene (Danian) | | France | A member of Dromiidae. | |
| Dromiopsis ceratoi | Sp. nov | Valid | Beschin et al. | Eocene (Ypresian) | | Italy | A crab belonging to the family Dromiidae. | |
| Dromiopsis longitudovata | Sp. nov | Valid | Beschin et al. | Eocene (Ypresian) | | Italy | A crab belonging to the family Dromiidae. | |
| Dromiopsis parvula | Sp. nov | Valid | Beschin et al. | Eocene (Ypresian) | | Italy | A crab belonging to the family Dromiidae. | |
| Dromiopsis vicetinus | Sp. nov | Valid | Beschin et al. | Eocene (Lutetian) | | Italy | A crab. | |
| Dynomene vetusta | Sp. nov | Valid | Beschin et al. | Eocene (Ypresian) | | Italy | A crab belonging to the family Dynomenidae. | |
| Elektrocarcinus | Gen. et comb. nov | Valid | Schweitzer et al. | Cretaceous (Albian to Maastrichtian) | | United Kingdom; United States | A crab belonging to the group Raninoida and the family Necrocarcinidae. A new genus for "Necrocarcinus" pierrensis Rathbun (1917); genus also includes Elektrocarcinus davisi (Bishop, 1985), E. olsonorum (Bishop and Williams, 1991), E. texensis (Rathbun, 1935) and E. woodwardi (Bell, 1863). | |
| Enoploclytia augustobonae | Sp. nov | Valid | Devillez et al. | Early Cretaceous (Barremian) | | France | A member of Erymidae. | |
| Enoploclytia gigantea | Sp. nov | Valid | Devillez et al. | Early Cretaceous (Albian) | | United States | A member of Erymidae. | |
| Eoacanthacaris | Gen. et sp. nov | Valid | Beschin et al. | Eocene (Lutetian) | | Italy | A lobster. Genus includes new species E. tethysianus. | |
| Eocarpilius lessineus | Sp. nov | Valid | Beschin et al. | Eocene (Lutetian) | | Italy | A crab belonging to the family Carpiliidae. | |
| Eocharybdis rugosa | Sp. nov | Valid | Beschin et al. | Eocene (Ypresian) | | Italy | A crab belonging to the family Portunidae. | |
| Eogeryon | Gen. et sp. nov | Valid | Ossó | Late Cretaceous (Cenomanian) | | Spain | A member of Portunoidea. The type species is E. elegius. | |
| Eomunidopsis prealpina | Sp. nov | Valid | Beschin et al. | Eocene (Ypresian) | | Italy | A squat lobster. Originally assigned to the family Munidopsidae, but subsequently transferred to the family Galatheidae and made the type species of the separate genus Tethysgalathea. | |
| Eosadayoshia | Gen. et sp. nov | Valid | Beschin et al. | Eocene (Ypresian) | | Italy | A member of Munididae. The type species is E. bolcensis. | |
| Eoxanthops | Gen. et sp. nov | Valid | Beschin et al. | Eocene (Ypresian) | | Italy | A crab belonging to the family Xanthidae. The type species is E. scutatus. | |
| Eryma vocontii | Sp. nov | Valid | Devillez et al. | Early Cretaceous (Albian) | | France | A member of Erymidae. | |
| Eumorphactaea convexa | Sp. nov | Valid | Beschin et al. | Eocene (Ypresian) | | Italy | A crab belonging to the family Pilumnidae. | |
| Eurotanais pyrenaensis | Sp. nov | Valid | Sánchez-García et al. | Late Cretaceous (Cenomanian) | Pyrenean amber | France | A member of Tanaidacea belonging the family Alavatanaidae. | |
| Eurotanais seilacheri | Sp. nov | Valid | Sánchez-García et al. | Late Cretaceous (Turonian) | Vendean amber | France | A member of Tanaidacea belonging the family Alavatanaidae. | |
| Faxegalathea valeccensis | Sp. nov | Valid | Beschin et al. | Eocene (Ypresian) | | Italy | A squat lobster. Originally assigned to the family Munidopsidae and to the genus Faxegalathea; subsequently transferred to the genus Tethysmunida by de Angeli & Ceccon (2017), but this transfer was rejected by Beschin et al. (2019). | |
| Folguerolesia | Gen. et comb. nov | Valid | Artal & Hyžný | Middle Eocene | | Spain | A member of Leucosioidea belonging to the new family Folguerolesiidae; a new genus for "Typilobus" boscoi Vía Boada (1959). | |
| Fornicaris | Gen. et sp. nov | Valid | Wilson & Selden in Selden et al. | Late Triassic (Norian) | Dolomia di Forni Formation | Italy | A member of Asellota belonging to the family Paramunnidae. The type species is Fornicaris calligarisi. | |
| Frontelata | Gen. et sp. nov | Valid | Beschin et al. | Eocene (Ypresian) | | Italy | A crab belonging to the superfamily Carpilioidea and the family Palaeoxanthopsidae. The type species is F. spinacomposita. | |
| Gabaleryon | Gen. et 2 sp. et comb. nov | Valid | Audo et al. | Early Jurassic (Toarcian) | | France; Germany; Italy; United Kingdom | A member of Polychelida. Genus includes new species Gabaleryon coquelae and Gabaleryon garassinoi, as well as "Eryon" moorei. | |
| Galathea lovarica | Sp. nov | Valid | Beschin et al. | Eocene (Lutetian) | | Italy | A species of Galathea. | |
| Galatheites aiola | Sp. nov | Valid | Robins et al. | Late Jurassic | Ernstbrunn Limestones; Štramberk Limestones | Austria; Czech Republic | A member of Galatheoidea, a species of Galatheites. | |
| Galatheites diasema | Sp. nov | Valid | Robins et al. | Late Jurassic | Ernstbrunn Limestones | Austria | A member of Galatheoidea, a species of Galatheites. | |
| Galatheites obtecta | Sp. nov | Valid | Robins et al. | Late Jurassic | | Romania | A member of Galatheoidea, a species of Galatheites. | |
| Gecchelicarcinus zanderigoi | Sp. nov | Valid | Beschin et al. | Eocene (Ypresian) | | Italy | A crab belonging to the family Macropipidae. | |
| Glabropilumnus trispinosus | Sp. nov | Valid | Beschin et al. | Eocene (Ypresian) | | Italy | A crab belonging to the family Pilumnidae. | |
| Glyphithyreus bendensis | Sp. nov | Valid | Schweitzer, Odumodu & Feldmann | Eocene | | Nigeria | A crab. | |
| Graptocarcinus eocenicus | Sp. nov | Valid | Beschin et al. | Eocene (Lutetian) | | Italy | A crab belonging to the family Dynomenidae. | |
| Haydnella granosa | Sp. nov | Valid | Beschin et al. | Eocene (Ypresian) | | Italy | A crab belonging to the family Xanthidae. | |
| Hispanigalathea tithonia | Sp. nov | Valid | Robins et al. | Late Jurassic | Ernstbrunn Limestones | Austria | A member of Galatheoidea, a species of Hispanigalathea. | |
| Hohensteiniella | Gen. et sp. nov | Valid | Haug et al. | Early Devonian | Hunsrück Slate | Germany | A crustacean with eumalacostracan affinities. The type species is H. engeli. | |
| Iphiculus eliasi | Sp. nov | Valid | Hyžný & Gross | Miocene | Florian Beds | Austria; Portugal; Spain | A crab belonging to the superfamily Leucosioidea and the family Iphiculidae. | |
| Iraticaris | Gen. et sp. nov | Valid | Adami-Rodrigues & Pazinato in Adami-Rodrigues, Pazinato & Pinto | Early Permian | Irati Formation | Brazil | A member of Pygocephalomorpha. The type species is I. damianii. | |
| Karyosia | Gen. et sp. nov | Valid | Schweitzer et al. | Early Cretaceous (Albian) | Glen Rose Formation; Walnut Formation | United States | A member of Etyiidae. The type species is Karyosia apicava. | |
| Kromtitis pseudolothi | Sp. nov | Valid | Beschin et al. | Eocene (Lutetian) | | Italy | A crab. | |
| Laevicarcinus serratus | Sp. nov | Valid | Beschin et al. | Eocene (Ypresian) | | Italy | A crab belonging to the family Panopeidae. | |
| Lemacola | Gen. et 3 sp. nov | Valid | Robins et al. | Late Jurassic | | Austria; Romania | A member of Galatheoidea. The type species is Lemacola jenniferae; genus also includes L. rossi and L. salia | |
| Lessinipagurus boschettensis | Sp. nov | Valid | Beschin et al. | Eocene (Lutetian) | | Italy | A hermit crab. | |
| Lessinipagurus vasjamikuzi | Sp. nov | Valid | Gašparič et al. | Eocene (late Bartonian–early Priabonian) | | Croatia | A hermit crab related to members of the genus Xylopagurus. | |
| Libinia amplissimus | Sp. nov | Valid | Feldmann & Schweitzer | Miocene | St. Marys Formation | United States | A species of Libinia. | |
| Liocarcinus priscus | Sp. nov | Valid | Beschin et al. | Eocene (Lutetian) | | Italy | A crab belonging to the family Carcinidae. | |
| Lovaracarpilius | Gen. et sp. nov | Valid | Beschin et al. | Eocene (Lutetian) | | Italy | A crab belonging to the family Carpiliidae. The type species is L. incisus. | |
| Lovaroides | Gen. et sp. nov | Valid | Beschin et al. | Eocene (Lutetian) | | Italy | A crab belonging to the superfamily Goneplacoidea and the family Carinocarcinoididae. The type species is L. elegans. | |
| Macrocheira columbiaensis | Sp. nov | Valid | Nyborg et al. | Early to middle Miocene | Astoria Formation | United States | A relative of the Japanese spider crab. | |
| Macrocheira jayi | Sp. nov | Valid | Nyborg et al. | Late Eocene to Oligocene | Hesquiat Formation | Canada | A relative of the Japanese spider crab. | |
| Macrocheira sullivani | Sp. nov | Valid | Nyborg et al. | Late Eocene to early Oligocene | Keasey Formation | United States | A relative of the Japanese spider crab. | |
| Magyarcarcinus yebraensis | Sp. nov | Valid | Domínguez & Ossó | Eocene (Bartonian) | Margas de Arguís Formation | Spain | A crab belonging to the superfamily Goneplacoidea, assigned to the new family Magyarcarcinidae. | |
| Mesogalathea macra | Sp. nov | Valid | Robins et al. | Late Jurassic | Ernstbrunn Limestones | Austria | A member of Galatheoidea, a species of Mesogalathea. | |
| Mesogalathea pyxis | Sp. nov | Valid | Robins et al. | Late Jurassic | Ernstbrunn Limestones | Austria | A member of Galatheoidea, a species of Mesogalathea. | |
| Mesogalathea retusa | Sp. nov | Valid | Robins et al. | Late Jurassic | Ernstbrunn Limestones | Austria | A member of Galatheoidea, a species of Mesogalathea. | |
| Metopocarcinus fragilis | Sp. nov | Valid | Beschin et al. | Eocene (Lutetian) | | Italy | A crab belonging to the family Panopeidae. | |
| Miopipus zovensis | Sp. nov | Valid | Beschin et al. | Eocene (Ypresian) | | Italy | A crab belonging to the family Carcinidae. | |
| Mithracia lovatoi | Sp. nov | Valid | Beschin et al. | Eocene (Lutetian) | | Italy | A crab belonging to the family Majidae. | |
| Montemagralia | Gen. et sp. nov | Valid | De Angeli & Ceccon | Eocene (Ypresian) | | Italy | A crab belonging to the family Trapeziidae. The type species is M. lata. | |
| Nanocassiope secretanae | Sp. nov | Valid | Beschin et al. | Eocene (Ypresian) | | Italy | A crab belonging to the family Xanthidae, a species of Nanocassiope. | |
| Neocallichirus khadroensis | Sp. nov | Valid | Hyžný & Charbonnier in Hyžný et al. | Paleocene (Danian) | Khadro Formation | Pakistan | Originally described as a member of Callianassidae and a species of Neocallichirus; subsequently transferred to the family Callichiridae and to the genus Karumballichirus. | |
| Neocallichirus lakhraensis | Sp. nov | Valid | Hyžný & Charbonnier in Hyžný et al. | Eocene (Ypresian) | Lakhra Formation | Pakistan | Originally described as a member of Callianassidae and a species of Neocallichirus; subsequently transferred to the family Callichiridae and to the genus Karumballichirus. | |
| Nicoliscarcinus | Gen. et sp. nov | Valid | Beschin et al. | Eocene (Ypresian) | | Italy | A crab belonging to the family Cancridae. The type species is N. rotundatus. | |
| Ophthalmoplax andina | Sp. nov | Valid | Guzmán et al. | Late Cretaceous (late Campanian) | Lodolitas de Aguacaliente Formation | Colombia | A member of Macropipidae, a species of Ophthalmoplax. Announced in 2016; validated in 2023. | |
| Paguristes paucituberculatus | Sp. nov | Valid | Beschin et al. | Eocene (Ypresian) | | Italy | A species of Paguristes. | |
| Palaeodromites xestos | Sp. nov | Valid | Schweitzer et al. | Early Cretaceous (Albian) | Walnut Formation | United States | A member of Homolodromioidea belonging to the family Goniodromitidae, a species of Palaeodromites. | |
| Palmyria levigata | Sp. nov | Valid | Beschin et al. | Eocene (Ypresian) | | Italy | A crab belonging to the family Domeciidae. | |
| Panopeus postalensis | Sp. nov | Valid | Beschin et al. | Eocene (Ypresian) | | Italy | A crab belonging to the family Panopeidae, a species of Panopeus. | |
| Paracancrinos | Gen. et comb. nov | Valid | Haug et al. | Late Cretaceous (Cenomanian) | | Lebanon | A member of Achelata. A new genus for "Cancrinos" libanensis Garassino & Schweigert (2006). | |
| Paracapsulapagurus | Gen. et sp. nov | Valid | Hyžný et al. | Late Cretaceous (Maastrichtian) | Cape de Naze Formation | Senegal | A hermit crab. The type species is P. poponguinensis. | |
| Paracorallomursia | Gen. et sp. nov | Valid | Beschin et al. | Eocene (Ypresian) | | Italy | A crab belonging to the family Calappidae. The type species is P. medizzai. | |
| Paradistefania denticulata | Sp. nov | Valid | Beschin et al. | Eocene (Ypresian) | | Italy | A crab belonging to the superfamily Homolodromioidea and the family Goniodromitidae. | |
| Paradynomene antiqua | Sp. nov | Valid | Beschin et al. | Eocene (Ypresian) | | Italy | A crab belonging to the family Dynomenidae. | |
| Paragalathea arcella | Sp. nov | Valid | Robins et al. | Late Jurassic | Ernstbrunn Limestones | Austria | A member of Galatheoidea, a species of Paragalathea. | |
| Paragalathea crenarvina | Sp. nov | Valid | Robins et al. | Late Jurassic | Ernstbrunn Limestones; Štramberk Limestones | Austria; Czech Republic | A member of Galatheoidea, a species of Paragalathea. | |
| Paragalathea ternata | Sp. nov | Valid | Robins et al. | Late Jurassic | Ernstbrunn Limestones | Austria | A member of Galatheoidea, a species of Paragalathea. | |
| Paragalathea vultuosona | Sp. nov | Valid | Robins et al. | Late Jurassic | Ernstbrunn Limestones | Austria | A member of Galatheoidea, a species of Paragalathea. | |
| Paraocalina silviae | Sp. nov | Valid | Beschin et al. | Eocene (Ypresian) | | Italy | A crab belonging to the family Carpiliidae. | |
| Paraporcellana | Gen. et sp. nov | Valid | Beschin et al. | Eocene (Ypresian) | | Italy | A porcelain crab. The type species is P. fabianii. | |
| Parhalimede | Gen. et sp. nov | Valid | Beschin et al. | Eocene (Lutetian) | | Italy | A crab belonging to the family Galenidae. The type species is P. ornata. | |
| Parthenope menini | Sp. nov | Valid | Beschin et al. | Eocene (Lutetian) | | Italy | A crab belonging to the family Parthenopidae. | |
| Permocaris | Gen. et sp. nov | Valid | Adami-Rodrigues, Pazinato & Pinto | Early Permian | Irati Formation | Brazil | A member of Pygocephalomorpha. The type species is P. purperae. | |
| Petrochirus minutus | Sp. nov | Valid | Beschin et al. | Eocene (Ypresian) | | Italy | A member of Diogenidae. | |
| Petrolisthes lineatus | Sp. nov | Valid | Beschin et al. | Eocene (Ypresian) | | Italy | A porcelain crab, a species of Petrolisthes. | |
| Petrusia | Gen. et sp. nov | Valid | Beschin et al. | Eocene (Ypresian) | | Italy | A crab belonging to the family Plagusiidae. The type species is P. striata. | |
| Phlyctenodes edwardsi | Sp. nov | Valid | Beschin et al. | Eocene (Ypresian) | | Italy | A crab belonging to the family Xanthidae, a species of Phlyctenodes. | |
| Pilummede | Gen. et sp. et comb. nov | Valid | Ossó & Clements | Eocene | Castle Hayne Limestone Formation; Clairbone Group | United States | A member of Pilumnoidea of uncertain phylogenetic placement. The type species is P. penderensis; genus also includes "Lobonotus" bakeri Rathbun (1935). | |
| Pilumnomimus dorsocarinatus | Sp. nov | Valid | Beschin et al. | Eocene (Ypresian) | | Italy | A crab belonging to the superfamily Xanthoidea of uncertain phylogenetic placement. | |
| Pilumnomimus miettoi | Sp. nov | Valid | Beschin et al. | Eocene (Ypresian) | | Italy | A crab belonging to the superfamily Xanthoidea of uncertain phylogenetic placement. | |
| Pittinucaris | Gen. et sp. nov | Valid | Adami-Rodrigues, Pazinato & Pinto | Early Permian | Irati Formation | Brazil | A member of Pygocephalomorpha. The type species is P. wuerdigae. | |
| Planocorystes | Gen. et sp. nov | Valid | Franţescu, Feldmann & Schweitzer | Cretaceous | | United States | A crab belonging to the group Raninoida. The type species is P. robreidi. | |
| Prealpicarcinus laisensis | Sp. nov | Valid | Beschin et al. | Eocene (Ypresian) | | Italy | A crab belonging to the family Pilumnidae. | |
| Prealpiplax | Gen. et sp. nov | Valid | Beschin et al. | Eocene (Ypresian) | | Italy | A crab belonging to the superfamily Goneplacoidea and the family Euryplacidae. The type species is P. lessinea. | |
| Prolecythocaris | Gen. et sp. nov | Valid | Schweigert & Robins | Late Jurassic (early Kimmeridgian) | | Germany | A crab belonging to the family Lecythocaridae. The type species is P. hauckei. | |
| Protomunida pentaspinosa | Sp. nov | Valid | Beschin et al. | Eocene (Ypresian) | | Italy | A member of Munididae. | |
| Pseudocorallomursia | Gen. et sp. nov | Valid | Beschin et al. | Eocene (Ypresian) | | Italy | A crab belonging to the family Calappidae. The type species is P. barbierii. | |
| Pseudolambrus antiquus | Sp. nov | Valid | Beschin et al. | Eocene (Lutetian) | | Italy | A crab belonging to the family Parthenopidae. | |
| Pustulina colossea | Sp. nov | Valid | Devillez et al. | Early Cretaceous (Hauterivian) | | France | A member of Erymidae. | |
| Pustulina occitana | Sp. nov | Valid | Devillez et al. | Early Cretaceous (Berriasian) | | France | A member of Erymidae. | |
| Rama | Gen. et sp. nov | Junior homonym | Beschin et al. | Eocene (Ypresian) | | Italy | A crab belonging to the family Cancridae. The type species is R. lineatuberculata. The generic name is preoccupied by Rama Bleeker; de Angeli & Ceccon (2017) coined a replacement name Ramacarcinus. | |
| Ramozius | Gen. et sp. nov | Valid | Beschin et al. | Eocene (Ypresian) | | Italy | A crab belonging to the family Pseudoziidae. The type species is R. punctatus. | |
| Raniliformis clampensis | Sp. nov | Valid | Beschin et al. | Eocene (Lutetian) | | Italy | A crab belonging to the family Raninidae. | |
| Rathbunopon viai | Sp. nov | Valid | González-León et al. | Early Cretaceous (Albian) | | Spain | A homolodromioid crab belonging to the family Prosopidae. | |
| Rosadromites | Gen. et sp. nov | Valid | Schweitzer et al. | Early Cretaceous (Albian) | Glen Rose Formation | United States | A member of Homolodromioidea belonging to the family Longodromitidae. The type species is Rosadromites texensis. | |
| Rugosanilia | Gen. et comb. nov | Valid | Beschin et al. | Eocene (Lutetian) | | Italy | A crab belonging to the family Raninidae. The type species is "Raniliformis" rugosa De Angeli & Beschin (2007). | |
| Sakaila italica | Sp. nov | Valid | Beschin et al. | Eocene (Lutetian) | | Italy | A species of Sakaila. | |
| Santeexanthus caporiondoi | Sp. nov | Valid | Beschin et al. | Eocene (Lutetian) | | Italy | A crab belonging to the superfamily Pseudozioidea and the family Pseudoziidae. | |
| Scutata | Gen. et sp. nov | Valid | Beschin et al. | Eocene (Ypresian) | | Italy | A crab belonging to the family Tetraliidae. The type species is S. eocenica. | |
| Serraphylctaena | Gen. et comb. nov | Valid | Robins et al. | Cretaceous (Albian/Cenomanian) | | Spain | A member of Galatheoidea. The type species is "Paragalathea" multisquamata Vía Boada (1981). | |
| Spathanomus | Gen. et sp. nov | Valid | De Angeli | Eocene (Priabonian) | | Italy | A crab belonging to the group Cyclodorippoida and the family Cymonomidae. The type species is Spathanomus felicianensis. | |
| Speocarcinus latus | Sp. nov | Valid | Beschin et al. | Eocene (Ypresian) | | Italy | A crab belonging to the family Xanthidae, a species of Speocarcinus. | |
| Tanidromites longinosa | Sp. nov | Valid | Starzyk | Late Jurassic (Oxfordian) | | Poland | A homolodromioid crab belonging to the family Tanidromitidae. | |
| Tanidromites muelleri | Sp. nov | Valid | Krobicki & Zatoń | Middle Jurassic (late Bajocian) | | Poland | A homolodromioid crab belonging to the family Tanidromitidae. | |
| Tanidromites schweitzerae | Sp. nov | Valid | Starzyk | Late Jurassic (Oxfordian) | | Poland | A homolodromioid crab belonging to the family Tanidromitidae. | |
| Tanidromites wysokaensis | Sp. nov | Disputed | Starzyk | Late Jurassic (Oxfordian) | | Poland | A homolodromioid crab belonging to the family Tanidromitidae. Klompmaker et al. (2020) considered this species to be a junior synonym of Tanidromites scheffnerae Schweigert & Koppka (2011). | |
| Tethysastacus | Gen. et comb. nov | Valid | Devillez et al. | Early Cretaceous (Valanginian) | | France | A member of Erymidae. The type species is T. tithonius. | |
| Tethyscarpilius | Gen. et sp. et comb. nov | Valid | De Angeli & Alberti | Eocene | | Italy; United States | A crab belonging to the family Carpiliidae. Genus includes new species T. bericus, as well as "Palaeocarpilius" brodkorbi Lewis & Ross (1965). | |
| Tetralia minuta | Sp. nov | Valid | Beschin et al. | Eocene (Ypresian) | | Italy | A crab belonging to the family Tetraliidae. | |
| Texicancer | Gen. et comb. nov | Valid | Franţescu, Feldmann & Schweitzer | Cretaceous | | United States | A crab belonging to the group Raninoida. The type species is "Necrocarcinus" renfroae Stenzel (1945). | |
| Thalassina tsuyamensis | Sp. nov | Valid | Ando & Kishimoto in Ando, Kishimoto & Kawano | Miocene | Yoshino Formation | Japan | A species of Thalassina. | |
| Thalassina yamato | Sp. nov | Valid | Ando & Kishimoto in Ando, Kishimoto & Kawano | Miocene | Kawachi Formation | Japan | A species of Thalassina. | |
| Titanocarcinus schweitzerae | Sp. nov | Valid | Robin et al. | Paleocene (Danian) | | France | A crab belonging to the family Tumidocarcinidae. | |
| Tonneleryon | Gen. et sp. nov | Valid | Audo | Early Jurassic (Toarcian) | Posidonia Shale | Germany | A member of Polychelida. The type species is T. schweigerti. | |
| Tropicalia | Gen. et sp. nov | Junior homonym | Beschin et al. | Eocene (Ypresian) | | Italy | A crab belonging to the family Domeciidae. The type species is T. parva. The generic name is preoccupied by Tropicalia Kocak & Kemal (2008); de Angeli & Ceccon (2017) coined a replacement name Proticalia. | |
| Tuberosagalathea | Gen. et comb. et 2 sp. nov | Valid | Robins et al. | Late Jurassic and Early Cretaceous (Hauterivian) | Ernstbrunn Limestones; Štramberk Limestones | Austria; Czech Republic; France; Poland; Romania | A member of Galatheoidea. The type species is "Galathea" neojurensis Patrulius (1959); genus also includes "Galatheites" neocomiensis Van Straelen (1936) and "Eomunidopsis" portlandica Fraaye & Collins (1996), as well as new species Tuberosagalathea tornatilis and Tuberosagalathea antefixa. | |
| Tymolus italicus | Sp. nov | Valid | Beschin et al. | Eocene (Ypresian) | | Italy | A crab belonging to the group Cyclodorippoida and the family Cyclodorippidae. | |
| Tytthotanais | Gen. et sp. nov | Valid | Sánchez-García et al. | Late Cretaceous (Cenomanian) | Pyrenean amber | France | A member of Tanaidacea of uncertain phylogenetic placement. The type species is T. tenvis. | |
| Vasconilia | Gen. et comb. et sp. nov | Valid | Robins et al. | Late Jurassic and Early Cretaceous | Ernstbrunn Limestones; Štramberk Limestones | Austria; Spain; Japan? | A member of Galatheoidea. The type species is "Galathea" ruizi Van Straelen (1940); genus also includes "Galatheites" straeleni Ruiz de Gaona (1943), as well as new species Vasconilia xystos. Genus might also include ?Vasconilia miyakoensis (Takeda & Fujiyama, 1983). | |
| Ypresicorystes | Gen. et sp. nov | Valid | Beschin et al. | Eocene (Ypresian) | | Italy | A crab belonging to the family Corystidae. The type species is Y. expansus. | |
| Zygastrocarcinus tricki | Sp. nov | Valid | Nyborg et al. | Late Cretaceous (Campanian) | Pierre Shale | United States | A crab belonging to the family Homolidae. | |

==== Ostracods ====
| Name | Novelty | Status | Authors | Age | Unit | Location | Notes | Images |
|---|---|---|---|---|---|---|---|---|
| Actinocythereis imbeensis | Sp. nov | Valid | De Mattos Manica & Coimbra | Early Miocene | Pelotas Basin | Brazil | A member of the family Trachyleberididae, a species of Actinocythereis. | |
| Amphizona? argentinensis | Sp. nov | Valid | Salas | Devonian (Lochkovian) | Talacasto Formation | Argentina | A member of Podocopa belonging to the Beyrichiocopida and the family Arcyzonidae. | |
| Aparchitellina magnicornigera | Sp. nov | Valid | Evdokimova in Abushik & Evdokimova | Devonian | Al'banov Formation | Russia | A member of Beyrichicopida belonging to the family Aparchitellinidae. | |
| Aparchitellina triangulata | Sp. nov | Valid | Evdokimova in Abushik & Evdokimova | Devonian | Rusanov Formation | Russia | A member of Beyrichicopida belonging to the family Aparchitellinidae. | |
| Asciocythere raybatei | Nom. nov | Valid | Kempf | Middle Jurassic | | United Kingdom | A member of Schulerideidae; a replacement name for Asciocythere acuminata Bate (1964). | |
| Bairdia sudrensis | Sp. nov | Valid | Ied & Ismail | Miocene | | Egypt | A member of the family Bairdiidae. | |
| Bingeria fluida | Sp. nov | Valid | Abushik in Abushik & Evdokimova | Silurian | Krasnaya Bukhta Formation; Ust'-Spokoinaya Formation | Russia | A member of Beyrichicopida belonging to the family Beyrichiidae. | |
| Bingeria lucida | Sp. nov | Valid | Abushik in Abushik & Evdokimova | Silurian | Srednii Formation | Russia | A member of Beyrichicopida belonging to the family Beyrichiidae. | |
| Bollia talacastensis | Sp. nov | Valid | Salas | Devonian (Lochkovian) | Talacasto Formation | Argentina | A member of Podocopa belonging to the Beyrichiocopida and the family Bollidae. | |
| Brachycythere smithsoniana | Sp. nov | Valid | Antonietto et al. | Early Cretaceous (Aptian-Albian) | Riachuelo Formation | Brazil | A member of Podocopida belonging to the group Cytherocopina and the family Trachyleberididae. | |
| Buntonia bassiounii | Sp. nov | Valid | Morsi, Hewaidy & Samir | Eocene | | Egypt | A member of Trachyleberididae, a species of Buntonia. | |
| Buntonia posteroacuta | Sp. nov | Valid | Morsi, Hewaidy & Samir | Eocene | | Egypt | A member of Trachyleberididae, a species of Buntonia. | |
| Bythoceratina brunomilhaui | Nom. nov | Valid | Kempf | Miocene | Waitemata Basin | New Zealand | A member of Bythocytheridae; a replacement name for Bythoceratina robusta Milhau (1993). | |
| Bythocythere agostinae | Sp. nov | Valid | Sciuto | Pleistocene | | Italy | | |
| Candona csikiiformis | Sp. nov | Valid | Teterina | Miocene | | Russia | | |
| Conchoprimitia brasiliensis | Sp. nov | Valid | Adôrno & Salas in Adôrno et al. | Late Ordovician | Vila Maria Formation | Brazil | A member of Podocopa belonging to the order Beyrichiocopida and the family Conchoprimitiidae. | |
| Cryptophyllus fossularis | Sp. nov | Valid | Abushik in Abushik & Evdokimova | Silurian | Ust'-Spokoinaya Formation | Russia | | |
| Cryptophyllus magnei | Sp. nov | Valid | Maillet & Casier in Maillet, Danelian & Casier | Devonian (Givetian) | Fromelennes Formation | Belgium | A possible member of Palaeocopida belonging to the family Rhabdostichidae, a species of Cryptophyllus. | |
| Ctenoloculinella papillifera | Sp. nov | Valid | Evdokimova in Abushik & Evdokimova | Devonian | Al'banov Formation; Rusanov Formation | Russia | A member of Hollinocopida belonging to the family Ctenoloculinidae. | |
| Cytherella abdelshafyii | Sp. nov | Valid | Ied & Ismail | Miocene | | Egypt | A member of the family Cytherellidae. | |
| Cytherellina subelliptica | Sp. nov | Valid | Evdokimova in Abushik & Evdokimova | Devonian | Al'banov Formation; Rusanov Formation | Russia | A member of Metacopida belonging to the family Healdiidae. | |
| Cytheretta africana | Sp. nov | Valid | Ied & Ismail | Miocene | | Egypt | A member of the family Cytherettidae. | |
| Cytheretta sinaensis | Sp. nov | Valid | Ied & Ismail | Miocene | | Egypt | A member of the family Cytherettidae. | |
| Cytheropteron morsii | Nom. nov | Valid | Kempf | Eocene | | Egypt | A member of Cytheruridae, a species of Cytheropteron. The original specific name was Cytheropteron bicostatum, Morsi, Hewaidy & Samir (2016), which turned out to be preoccupied by Cytheropteron bicostatum Brand (1990). | |
| Cytheropteron nukhulensis | Sp. nov | Valid | Morsi, Hewaidy & Samir | Eocene | | Egypt | A member of Cytheruridae, a species of Cytheropteron. | |
| Cytheropteron speijeri | Sp. nov | Valid | Morsi, Hewaidy & Samir | Eocene | | Egypt | A member of Cytheruridae, a species of Cytheropteron. | |
| Digmocythere centroreticulata | Sp. nov | Valid | Morsi, Hewaidy & Samir | Eocene | | Egypt | A member of Trachyleberididae, a species of Digmocythere. | |
| Ectonodoconcha | Gen. et sp. nov | Valid | Ceolin & Whatley in Ceolin et al. | Paleocene (Danian) | Neuquén Basin | Argentina | A member of Cytheridae. The type species is Ectonodoconcha lepidotus. | |
| Eobeyrichia nordensis | Sp. nov | Valid | Abushik in Abushik & Evdokimova | Silurian | Srednii Formation | Russia | A member of Beyrichicopida belonging to the family Beyrichiidae. | |
| Eobeyrichia subeurina | Sp. nov | Valid | Abushik in Abushik & Evdokimova | Silurian | Samoilovich Formation; Srednii Formation | Russia | A member of Beyrichicopida belonging to the family Beyrichiidae. | |
| Eokloedenia reticulata | Sp. nov | Valid | Abushik in Abushik & Evdokimova | Late Silurian | Krasnaya Bukhta Formation | Russia | A member of Beyrichicopida belonging to the family Kloedeniidae. | |
| Eukloedeneterra | Gen. et sp. nov | Valid | Abushik in Abushik & Evdokimova | Silurian | Samoilovich Formation; Srednii Formation | Russia | A member of Kloedenellocopida belonging to the family Kloedenellidae. The type species is E. borealis. | |
| Evlanella peranensis | Sp. nov | Valid | Maillet in Maillet et al. | Devonian (Givetian) | Candás Formation | Spain | A species of Evlanella. | |
| Evlanella tuberculifera | Sp. nov | Valid | Evdokimova in Abushik & Evdokimova | Early Devonian | Al'banov Formation | Russia | A member of Kloedenellocopida belonging to the family Lichviniidae. | |
| Gabonorygma | Gen. et comb. et sp. nov | Valid | Antonietto et al. | Late Jurassic (Kimmeridgian–early Tithonian) and Early Cretaceous (Aptian-Albian) | Madiéla Formation; Riachuelo Formation | Brazil; Denmark; Gabon | A member of Podocopida belonging to the group Cytherocopina and the family Krithidae. The type species is "Dicrorygma" brotzeni Christensen (1965); genus also includes new species G. sergipana. | |
| Kozlowskiella? nuda | Sp. nov | Valid | Evdokimova in Abushik & Evdokimova | Devonian | Al'banov Formation | Russia | A member of Beyrichicopida belonging to the family Aparchitellinidae. | |
| Kuznetsoviella | Nom. nov | Valid | Doweld | Early Cretaceous (Barremian) | | Azerbaijan | A replacement name for Aenigma Kuznetsova (1957) and Kuznetsovia Doweld (2016) (both preoccupied). | |
| Limnocythere alexanderi | Sp. nov | Valid | Palacios-Fest, Cusminsky & McGlue | Late Quaternary | | Argentina | A species of Limnocythere. | |
| Limnocythere foresteri | Sp. nov | Valid | Palacios-Fest, Cusminsky & McGlue | Late Quaternary | | Argentina | A species of Limnocythere. | |
| Limnocythere lysandrosi | Sp. nov | Valid | Palacios-Fest, Cusminsky & McGlue | Late Quaternary | | Argentina | A species of Limnocythere. | |
| Limnocythere ruipunctifinalis | Sp. nov | Valid | Palacios-Fest, Cusminsky & McGlue | Late Quaternary | | Argentina | A species of Limnocythere. | |
| Microxestoleberis scillae | Sp. nov | Valid | Sciuto | Pleistocene | | Italy | | |
| Mongolocypris kohi | Sp. nov | Valid | Choi & Huh | Early Cretaceous (Albian) | Jinju Formation | South Korea | A non-marine ostracod, a species of Mongolocypris. | |
| Mosolovina conifera | Sp. nov | Valid | Evdokimova in Abushik & Evdokimova | Devonian | Al'banov Formation | Russia | A member of Beyrichicopida belonging to the family Aparchitellinidae. | |
| Mosolovina costulifera | Sp. nov | Valid | Evdokimova in Abushik & Evdokimova | Devonian | Al'banov Formation | Russia | A member of Beyrichicopida belonging to the family Aparchitellinidae. | |
| Neohornibrookella nepeani | Sp. nov | Valid | Warne & Whatley | Neogene | | Australia | | |
| Neurocythere multiforma | Sp. nov | Valid | Pais et al. | Middle Jurassic (Callovian) | | Portugal | | |
| Nodoconcha polytorosa | Sp. nov | Valid | Ceolin & Whatley in Ceolin et al. | Paleocene (Danian) | Neuquén Basin | Argentina | A member of Cytheridae, a species of Nodoconcha. | |
| Nodoconcha sanniosis | Sp. nov | Valid | Ceolin & Whatley in Ceolin et al. | Paleocene (Danian) | Neuquén Basin | Argentina | A member of Cytheridae, a species of Nodoconcha. | |
| Nodoconcha upsilon | Sp. nov | Valid | Ceolin & Whatley in Ceolin et al. | Paleocene (Danian) | Neuquén Basin | Argentina | A member of Cytheridae, a species of Nodoconcha. | |
| Norditerria | Gen. et 2 sp. nov | Valid | Abushik in Abushik & Evdokimova | Silurian | Krasnaya Bukhta Formation; Ust'-Spokoinaya Formation | Russia | A member of Beyrichicopida belonging to the family Hexophthalmoididae. The type species is N. torosa; genus also includes N. simplex. | |
| Noviportia cornuta | Sp. nov | Valid | Abushik in Abushik & Evdokimova | Silurian | Samoilovich Formation; Srednii Formation | Russia | A member of Beyrichicopida belonging to the family Zygobolbidae. | |
| Nyhamnella elongata | Sp. nov | Valid | Abushik in Abushik & Evdokimova | Silurian | Srednii Formation | Russia | A member of Kloedenellocopida belonging to the family Gotlandellidae. | |
| Occultocythereis alsheikhlyi | Nom. nov | Valid | Kempf | Late Cretaceous (Maastrichtian) | | Iraq | A member of Trachyleberididae; a replacement name for Occultocythereis elongata Al-Sheikhly (1982). | |
| Oertliella petraensis | Sp. nov | Valid | Al-Sheikhly | Paleocene (Danian) | Taqiye Formation | Jordan | A member of the family Trachyleberididae, a species of Oertliella. | |
| Paenaequina recta | Sp. nov | Valid | Abushik in Abushik & Evdokimova | Devonian (Emsian) | Al'banov Formation | Russia | A member of Leperditicopida belonging to the family Schrenckiidae. | |
| Palaeocytheridea (Malzevia)? dorsocostata | Sp. nov | Valid | Pais et al. | Middle Jurassic (Callovian) | | Portugal | | |
| Paragrenocythere monilis | Sp. nov | Valid | Al-Sheikhly | Late Cretaceous (Maastrichtian) | Shiranish Formation | Iraq | A member of the family Trachyleberididae, a species of Paragrenocythere. | |
| Parakrithe tayibaensis | Sp. nov | Valid | Morsi, Hewaidy & Samir | Eocene | | Egypt | A member of Krithidae, a species of Parakrithe. | |
| Peloriops levisulcata | Sp. nov | Valid | Al-Sheikhly | Late Cretaceous (late Campanian?-Maastrichtian) | Hartha Formation; Shiranish Formation | Iraq | A member of the family Trachyleberididae, a species of Peloriops. | |
| Perissocytheridea colini | Sp. nov | Valid | Nogueira & Ramos | Oligocene-Miocene | Pirabas Formation | Brazil | An ostracod, a species of Perissocytheridea. | |
| Perissocytheridea largulateralis | Sp. nov | Valid | Nogueira & Ramos | Oligocene-Miocene | Pirabas Formation | Brazil | An ostracod, a species of Perissocytheridea. | |
| Perissocytheridea pirabensis | Sp. nov | Valid | Nogueira & Ramos | Oligocene-Miocene | Pirabas Formation | Brazil | An ostracod, a species of Perissocytheridea. | |
| Perissocytheridea punctoreticulata | Sp. nov | Valid | Nogueira & Ramos | Oligocene-Miocene | Pirabas Formation | Brazil | An ostracod, a species of Perissocytheridea. | |
| Petrisigmoopsis? rotundum | Sp. nov | Valid | Salas | Devonian (Lochkovian) | Los Espejos Formation; Talacasto Formation | Argentina | A member of Podocopa belonging to the Beyrichiocopida and the family Bollidae. | |
| Pircawayra antiqua | Sp. nov | Valid | Salas | Devonian (Lochkovian) | Talacasto Formation | Argentina | A member of Podocopa belonging to the Beyrichiocopida and the superfamily Kloedenelloidea. | |
| Platybolbina calva | Sp. nov | Valid | Abushik in Abushik & Evdokimova | Late Silurian | Krasnaya Bukhta Formation | Russia | A member of Hollinocopida belonging to the family Eurychilinidae. | |
| Praebythoceratina deltalata | Sp. nov | Valid | Antonietto et al. | Early Cretaceous (Aptian-Albian) | Riachuelo Formation | Brazil | A member of Podocopida belonging to the group Cytherocopina and the family Bythocytheridae. | |
| Praebythoceratina parascrobiculata | Sp. nov | Valid | Pais et al. | Middle Jurassic (Callovian) | | Portugal | | |
| Praeschuleridea lisensis | Sp. nov | Valid | Pais et al. | Middle Jurassic (Callovian) | | Portugal | | |
| Protobrachycythere | Gen. et 2 sp. nov | Valid | Karpuk | Early Cretaceous (Barremian-Aptian) | | Crimean Peninsula | A member of the family Protocytheridae. The type species is P. taurica; genus also includes P. aptica. | |
| Pteriella? dubia | Sp. nov | Valid | Abushik in Abushik & Evdokimova | Silurian | Srednii Formation | Russia | A member of Hollinocopida belonging to the suborder Primitiopsicopina. | |
| Reticulina ninurta | Sp. nov | Valid | Al-Sheikhly | Middle-late Eocene | Avanah Formation; Jaddala Formation | Iraq | A member of the family Trachyleberididae, a species of Reticulina. | |
| Reticulina syriaensis | Sp. nov | Valid | Al-Sheikhly | Paleocene | Aaliji Formation | Syria | A member of the family Trachyleberididae, a species of Reticulina. | |
| Saccarchites tumefactus | Sp. nov | Valid | Abushik in Abushik & Evdokimova | Late Silurian | Ust'-Spokoinaya Formation | Russia | A member of Beyrichicopida belonging to the family Ochescaphidae. | |
| Samarella centrigibbera | Sp. nov | Valid | Evdokimova in Abushik & Evdokimova | Devonian | Rusanov Formation | Russia | A member of Metacopida belonging to the family Rishonidae. | |
| Sapucariella | Gen. et comb. et 3 sp. nov | Valid | Puckett, Andreu & Colin | Early Cretaceous (Aptian)-early Paleocene | | Agulhas Bank; Algeria; Brazil; Cameroon; Egypt; Gabon; Ghana; India; Iran; Israel; Ivory Coast; Kuwait; Lebanon; Libya; Madagascar; Mali; Morocco; Niger; Nigeria; Oman; Saudi Arabia; Senegal; South Africa; Tanzania; Togo; Tunisia; United Arab Emirates | A member of the family Brachycytheridae. The type species is "Brachycythere" sapucariensis Krömmelbein (1964); genus also includes "Brachycythere" agulhasensis Dingle (1971), S. angulata (Grékoff, 1951), "Brachycythere" arabica Al-Furaih (1985), "Brachycythere" armata Reyment (1960), "Brachycythere" beershevaensis Honigstein (1984), "Brachycythere" dumoni Bismuth & Saint-Marc in Bismuth et al. (1981), "Brachycythere" ekpo Reyment (1960), "Brachycythere" glypta Al-Furaih (1985), "Brachycythere" ilamensis Emami (1990), "Brachycythere" iranensis Emami (1990), "Brachycythere" jodhpurensis Singh (1997), "Brachycythere" kulatturensis Guha (1971), "Brachycythere" labioforma Emami (1990), "Cytheridea" longicaudata Chapman (1904), "Brachycythere" meata Al-Furaih (1985), "Brachycythere" multidifferentis Nicolaidis & Piovesan in Piovesan et al. (2013), "Brachycythere" oguni Reyment (1960), "Brachycythere" posterotruncata Emami (1990), "Brachycythere" pucketti Babinot et al. (2009), "Brachycythere" reymenti Emami (1990), "Brachycythere" rotunda Dingle (1969), "Brachycythere" shamlani Al-Furaih (1985), "Brachycythere" sicarius Dingle (1980), "Brachycythere" sillakkudiensis Sastry et al. (1972), "Brachycythere" subtriangulata Singh & Porwal (1989), "Brachycythere" tumida Al-Furaih (1985), "Brachycythere" undosa Al-Furaih (1985) and "Brachycythere" ventrocomplanatus Delicio et al. (2000), as well as new species S. honigsteini, S. parvoangulata and S. pseudosapucariensis. | |
| Satiellina paranaensis | Sp. nov | Valid | Adôrno & Salas in Adôrno et al. | Late Ordovician | Vila Maria Formation | Brazil | A member of Podocopa belonging to the order Beyrichiocopida and the superfamily Drepanelloidea. | |
| Sibiritia ? septentrionalis | Sp. nov | Valid | Abushik in Abushik & Evdokimova | Silurian | Golomyannyi Formation; Srednii Formation; Vodopad Formation | Russia | A member of Leperditicopida belonging to the family Sibiritiidae. | |
| Signetopsis bolbilobata | Sp. nov | Valid | Abushik in Abushik & Evdokimova | Silurian | Ust'-Spokoinaya Formation | Russia | A member of Hollinocopida belonging to the family Signetopsidae. | |
| Suinella | Gen. et sp. nov | Valid | Salas | Devonian (Lochkovian) | Talacasto Formation | Argentina | A member of Podocopa belonging to the Beyrichiocopida and possibly to the family Primitiopsidae. The type species is S. huarpesi. | |
| Sulcella? acuminata | Sp. nov | Valid | Evdokimova in Abushik & Evdokimova | Devonian | Al'banov Formation | Russia | A member of Kloedenellocopida belonging to the family Mennerellidae. | |
| Sulcella? annae | Sp. nov | Valid | Evdokimova in Abushik & Evdokimova | Devonian | Al'banov Formation | Russia | A member of Kloedenellocopida belonging to the family Mennerellidae. | |
| Sulcella? modesta | Sp. nov | Valid | Evdokimova in Abushik & Evdokimova | Devonian | Al'banov Formation | Russia | A member of Kloedenellocopida belonging to the family Mennerellidae. | |
| Timanella magna | Sp. nov | Valid | Evdokimova in Abushik & Evdokimova | Devonian | Al'banov Formation | Russia | A member of Platycopida belonging to the family Ellesclavidae. | |
| Timanella rara | Sp. nov | Valid | Evdokimova in Abushik & Evdokimova | Devonian | Al'banov Formation | Russia | A member of Platycopida belonging to the family Ellesclavidae. | |
| Tollitia navicula | Sp. nov | Valid | Abushik in Abushik & Evdokimova | Silurian | Golomyannyi Formation; Srednii Formation | Russia | A member of Leperditicopida belonging to the family Tollitiidae. | |
| Tricostabrachycythere | Gen. et comb. nov | Valid | Puckett, Andreu & Colin | Cretaceous (Albian-Cenomanian) | Goru Formation | India; Morocco; Venezuela | A member of the family Brachycytheridae. The type species is "Veenia" kharatarensis Singh (1997). | |
| Tvaerenella? ambigua | Sp. nov | Valid | Abushik in Abushik & Evdokimova | Silurian | Srednii Formation | Russia | A member of Hollinocopida belonging to the family Piretellidae. | |
| Virgulacytheridea posteroacuminata | Sp. nov | Valid | Pais et al. | Middle Jurassic (Callovian) | | Portugal | | |
| Xestoleberis morsiana | Nom. nov | Valid | Kempf | Eocene | | Egypt | A member of Xestoleberididae, a species of Xestoleberis. The original specific name was Xestoleberis posterotruncata Morsi, Hewaidy & Samir (2016), which turned to be preoccupied by Xestoleberis posterotruncata Titterton & Whatley (2005). | |

==== Other crustaceans ====
| Name | Novelty | Status | Authors | Age | Unit | Location | Notes | Images |
|---|---|---|---|---|---|---|---|---|
| Apocyclops californicus | Sp. nov | Valid | Hołyńska, Leggitt & Kotov | Miocene (latest Burdigalian or earliest Langhian) | Barstow Formation | United States | A cyclopid copepod, a species of Apocyclops. | |
| Arcuatoscalpellum | Gen. et comb. nov | Valid | Gale | Cretaceous (Aptian to Maastrichtian) | | France; United Kingdom | A goose barnacle belonging to the family Scalpellidae. The type species is "Scalpellum" arcuatum Darwin (1851); genus also includes "Scalpellum" (Arcoscalpellum) comptum Withers (1910) and "Scalpellum" trilineatum Darwin (1851). | |
| Catherinum anglicum | Sp. nov | Valid | Gale | Late Cretaceous (Campanian) | | United Kingdom | A goose barnacle belonging to the family Scalpellidae, a species of Catherinum. | |
| Cetopirus fragilis | Sp. nov | Valid | Collareta et al. | Early Pleistocene | | Italy; United States (South Carolina) | A whale barnacle, a species of Cetopirus. | |
| Conopea bacata | Sp. nov | Valid | Carriol in Carriol & Schneider | Miocene (Burdigalian) | | Germany | A barnacle belonging to the family Archaeobalanidae, a species of Conopea. | |
| Gesvesia | Gen. et sp. nov | Valid | Gueriau et al. | Devonian (Famennian) | | Belgium | A clam shrimp belonging to the group Spinicaudata. The type species is Gesvesia pernegrei. | |
| Haltinnaias | Gen. et sp. nov | Valid | Gueriau et al. | Devonian (Famennian) | | Belgium | A member of Anostraca. The type species is Haltinnaias serrata. | |
| Myolepas reussi | Sp. nov | Valid | Kočí et al. | Late Cretaceous (late Cenomanian to early Turonian) | Bohemian Cretaceous Basin | Czech Republic | A goose barnacle. | |
| Nestoria sikeshuensis | Sp. nov | Valid | Teng et al. | Early Cretaceous | Tugulu Group | China | A clam shrimp belonging to the superfamily Eosestherioidea and the family Nestoriidae. | |
| Pachyscalpellum heltzeli | Sp. nov | Valid | Jagt, Verhesen & Goolaerts | Late Cretaceous (Maastrichtian) | El Haria Formation | Tunisia | A goose barnacle belonging to the family Scalpellidae, a species of Pachyscalpellum. | |
| Plesiobrachylepas | Gen. et sp. nov | Valid | Carriol in Carriol et al. | Eocene | Mo Clay Formation | Denmark | A barnacle belonging to the group Sessilia and the family Brachylepadidae. The type species is Plesiobrachylepas jutlandica. | |
| Pseudoscapholeberis | Gen. et sp. nov | Valid | Flössner & Fryer | Cretaceous (late Albian or earliest Cenomanian) | | France | A member of Anomopoda. The type species is Pseudoscapholeberis enigmatica. | |
| Scillaelepas danningeri | Sp. nov | Valid | Carriol in Carriol & Schneider | Miocene (Burdigalian) | Ottnang Formation | Austria; Germany | A barnacle belonging to the family Calanticidae, a species of Scillaelepas. | |
| Stipilepas | Gen. et sp. nov | Valid | Carriol in Carriol et al. | Eocene | Mo Clay Formation | Denmark | A goose barnacle belonging to the group Scalpelliformes and the family Eolepadidae. The type species is Stipilepas molerensis. | |

== Trilobites ==
=== Research ===
- Queues of the trilobite Trimerocephalus chopini are described from the Devonian (Famennian) of Poland by Błażejowski et al. (2016), who interpret these queues as representing mass migratory chains.
- Disarticulated exoskeletons of the phacopids belonging to the species Omegops cornelius preserved within a nautiloid conch are described from the Devonian Hongguleleng Formation (China) by Zong, Fan & Gong (2016), who interpret the fossils as indicating that the trilobites had moulted within the living chamber of a dead nautiloid.

=== New taxa ===
| Name | Novelty | Status | Authors | Age | Unit | Location | Notes | Images |
|---|---|---|---|---|---|---|---|---|
| Abarrandia | Gen. et sp. nov | Valid | Zhou, Zhou & Yin | Ordovician (Darriwilian) | Zhuozishan Formation | China | A nileid. Genus includes new species A. wuhaiensis. | |
| Acanthomicmacca franconica | Sp. nov | Valid | Geyer | Cambrian | | Germany | A member of Chengkouiidae. | |
| Acanthomicmacca hupei | Sp. nov | Valid | Geyer | Middle Cambrian | Jbel Wawrmast Formation | Morocco | A member of Chengkouiidae. | |
| Acanthomicmacca mirandoides | Sp. nov | Valid | Geyer | Cambrian | | | A member of Chengkouiidae. | |
| Acanthomicmacca morrisoni | Sp. nov | Valid | Geyer | Middle Cambrian | Jbel Wawrmast Formation | Morocco | A member of Chengkouiidae. | |
| Acanthomicmacca rana | Sp. nov | Valid | Geyer | Cambrian | | | A member of Chengkouiidae. | |
| Acastoides poschmanni | Sp. nov | Valid | Basse & Müller | Devonian (Emsian) | Rupbach Shale | Germany | | |
| Agasella prona | Sp. nov | Valid | Salikhova in Pegel et al. | Cambrian | | Russia | A member of Ptychopariida belonging to the family Agraulidae. | |
| Amphitryon xiushanensis | Sp. nov | Valid | Zhou, Zhou & Xiang | Ordovician | Pagoda Formation | China | | |
| Ampyx gongwusuensis | Sp. nov | Valid | Lee et al. | Ordovician (Darriwilian) | Klimoli Formation | China | | |
| Ampyxinella latilimbata | Sp. nov | Valid | Zhou, Zhou & Yin | Ordovician (Darriwilian) | Zhuozishan Formation | China | | |
| Amslamia | Gen. et sp. nov | Valid | Geyer | Cambrian | | Morocco | A member of Chengkouiidae. Genus includes new species A. rudkini. | |
| Anaxarete | Gen. et comb. nov | Junior homonym | Geyer | Cambrian | | | A member of Protoleninae; a new genus for "Micmacca" ellipsocephaloides var. senior (recombined as Anaxarete senior). The generic name is preoccupied by Anaxarete Gistl (1848). | |
| Anechocephalus intermedius | Sp. nov | Valid | Chatterton & Gibb | Cambrian (Furongian) | | Canada | | |
| Anechocephalus rebeccaae | Sp. nov | Valid | Chatterton & Gibb | Cambrian (Furongian) | | Canada | | |
| Angustinouyia | Gen. et sp. nov | Valid | Yuan & Zhang in Yuan, Zhang & Zhu | Cambrian | | China | A member of the family Inouyiidae. Genus includes new species A. quadrata. | |
| Apatokephalus rugosus | Sp. nov | Valid | Tortello & Esteban | Ordovician (Tremadocian) | Santa Rosita Formation | Argentina | | |
| Asaphellus clarksoni | Sp. nov | Valid | Tortello & Esteban | Ordovician (Tremadocian) | Santa Rosita Formation | Argentina | | |
| Asteromajia dongshankouensis | Sp. nov | Valid | Zhu in Yuan, Zhang & Zhu | Cambrian | | China | A member of Ptychopariida belonging to the family Crepicephalidae. | |
| Aulacopleura (Paraaulacopleura) lemkei | Sp. nov | Valid | Basse & Müller | Devonian (Eifelian) | Rupbach Shale | Germany | | |
| Austerops legrandi | Sp. nov | Valid | Khaldi et al. | Early Devonian | 'Chefar el Ahmar' Formation | Algeria | A phacopid, a species of Austerops. | |
| Australoscutellum talenti | Sp. nov | Valid | Holloway & Lane | Silurian | Tomcat Creek limestone | Australia | | |
| Barrandeops chattertoni | Sp. nov | Valid | Khaldi et al. | Early Devonian | 'Chefar el Ahmar' Formation | Algeria | A phacopid. Originally described as a species of Barrandeops; Van Viersen & Holland (2016) considered the genus Barrandeops to be a junior synonym of the genus Morocops and subsequently Van Viersen, Holland & Koppka (2017) transferred the species B. chattertoni to the genus Morocops. | |
| Barrandeops (Lahnops) | Subgen. et sp. et nom. nov | Valid | Basse & Müller | Devonian | Leun Shale; Rupbach Shale | Germany | The subgenus includes new species Barrandeops (Lahnops) steinmeyeri, as well as Barrandeops (Lahnops) burhennei (a replacement name for Phacops holzapfeli Burhenne). | |
| Binodaspis nuda | Sp. nov | Valid | Pegel in Pegel et al. | Cambrian | | Russia | A member of Ptychopariida belonging to the family Ptychopariidae. | |
| Buitella concava | Sp. nov | Valid | Pegel & Salikhova in Pegel et al. | Cambrian | | Russia | A member of Ptychopariida belonging to the subfamily Conokephalininae. | |
| Camarella | Gen. et sp. nov | Junior homonym | Zhu in Yuan, Zhang & Zhu | Cambrian | | China | A member of the family Solenopleuridae. Genus includes new species C. tumida. The generic name is preoccupied by Camarella Dall (1877). | |
| Carioides | Gen. et sp. nov | Valid | Bushuev & Makarova | Cambrian | Chaya Formation | Russia | A member of Anomocaridae. Genus includes new species C. enodis. | |
| Cernuolimbus ludvigseni | Sp. nov | Valid | Chatterton & Gibb | Cambrian (Furongian) | | Canada | | |
| Chlupacops | Gen. et sp. et comb. nov | Valid | Feist in Feist, Mahboubi & Girard | Late Devonian | | Algeria; Germany; Morocco | A member of Phacopidae. The type species is C. laticeps; genus also includes "Phacops" cryphoides Richter & Richter (1926) and possibly "Phacops" reichi Kegel (1931), "Phacops" koeneni Holzapfel (1895) and "Nephranops" spectabilis Meischner (1965). | |
| Claycreekia | Gen. et sp. nov | Valid | Chatterton & Gibb | Cambrian (Furongian) | | Canada | A member of the family Olenidae. Genus includes new species C. chrisorum. | |
| Cliffia aitkeni | Sp. nov | Valid | Chatterton & Gibb | Cambrian (Furongian) | | Canada | | |
| Corrugatagnostus ningqiangensis | Sp. nov | Valid | Zhou, Zhou & Xiang | Ordovician | Pagoda Formation | China | | |
| Cybantyx? ergodes | Sp. nov | Valid | Holloway & Lane | Silurian | Tomcat Creek limestone | Australia | | |
| Cyclopyge latilimbata | Sp. nov | Valid | Zhou, Zhou & Xiang | Ordovician | Pagoda Formation | China | | |
| Cyphaspides (Cyphaspides) malbertii | Sp. nov | Valid | Basse & Müller | Devonian (Eifelian) | Rupbach Shale | Germany | | |
| Cyphaspides (Cyphaspides) weugi | Sp. nov | Valid | Basse & Müller | Devonian (Eifelian) | Wissenbach Shale | Germany | | |
| Cyphaspis bluhmi | Sp. nov | Valid | Van Viersen & Holland | Devonian (Eifelian) | Taboumakhloûf Formation? | Morocco | | |
| Cyphaspis boninoi | Sp. nov | Valid | Van Viersen & Holland | Devonian (Eifelian) | Hanonet Formation | Belgium | | |
| Cyphaspis eximia | Sp. nov | Valid | Van Viersen & Holland | Devonian (Eifelian) | | Morocco | | |
| Cyphaspis foumzguidensis | Sp. nov | Valid | Van Viersen & Holland | Devonian (Eifelian) | Timrhanrhart Formation | Morocco | | |
| Cyphaspis heisingi | Sp. nov | Valid | Van Viersen & Holland | Devonian (Pragian) | Assa Formation | Morocco | | |
| Cyphaspis ihmadii | Sp. nov | Valid | Van Viersen & Holland | Devonian (Givetian) | Bou Dîb Formation | Morocco | | |
| Cyphaspis juergenhollandi | Sp. nov | Valid | Van Viersen & Holland | Devonian (Emsian) | Amerboh Group | Morocco | | |
| Cyphaspis khraidensis | Sp. nov | Valid | Van Viersen & Holland | Devonian (Emsian) | Timrhanrhart Formation | Morocco | | |
| Cyphaspis kippingi | Sp. nov | Valid | Van Viersen & Holland | Devonian (Emsian) | Tazoulait Formation | Morocco | | |
| Cyphaspis kweberi | Sp. nov | Valid | Basse & Müller | Devonian (Emsian) | Rupbach Shale | Germany | | |
| Cyphaspis lerougei | Sp. nov | Valid | Van Viersen & Holland | Devonian (Eifelian) | Khebchia Formation | Morocco | | |
| Cyphaspis maharchensis | Sp. nov | Valid | Van Viersen & Holland | Devonian (Pragian) | Ihandar Formation | Morocco | | |
| Cyphaspis smeenki | Sp. nov | Valid | Van Viersen & Holland | Devonian (Eifelian) | El Otfal Formation | Morocco | | |
| Cyphaspis tadachachtensis | Sp. nov | Valid | Van Viersen & Holland | Devonian (Emsian) | Khebchia Formation | Morocco | | |
| Danzhaina triangularis | Sp. nov | Valid | Yuan & Gao in Yuan, Zhang & Zhu | Cambrian | | China | A member of the family Ptychopariidae. | |
| Daopingia quadrata | Sp. nov | Valid | Yuan & Zhang in Yuan, Zhang & Zhu | Cambrian | | China | A member of Ptychopariida belonging to the family Proasaphiscidae. | |
| Dechenella burmeisteri emstae | Subsp. nov | Valid | Basse, Koch & Lemke | Devonian (Givetian) | | Germany | A member of the family Proetidae. | |
| Degamella interrupta | Sp. nov | Valid | Zhou, Zhou & Xiang | Ordovician | Pagoda Formation | China | | |
| Degamella latifrons | Sp. nov | Valid | Zhou, Zhou & Xiang | Ordovician | Pagoda Formation | China | | |
| Destombesina schumacherorum | Sp. nov | Valid | Basse & Müller | Devonian (Emsian) | Rupbach Shale | Germany | | |
| Diademaproetus habenichti | Sp. nov | Valid | Basse & Müller | Devonian (Emsian) | Rupbach Shale | Germany | | |
| Dislobosaspis angustiglossoides | Sp. nov | Valid | Zhou, Zhou & Xiang | Ordovician | Pagoda Formation | China | | |
| Dolabrapex | Gen. et sp. nov | Valid | Holloway & Lane | Silurian | Tomcat Creek limestone | Australia | A member of Scutelluidae. Genus includes new species D. acomus. | |
| Dorypyge? aliena | Sp. nov | Valid | Pegel in Pegel et al. | Cambrian | | Russia | A member of Dorypygidae. | |
| Dorypyge areolata | Sp. nov | Valid | Yuan & Zhang in Yuan, Zhang & Zhu | Cambrian | | China | A member of the family Dorypygidae. | |
| Dunderbergia? edgecombei | Sp. nov | Valid | Chatterton & Gibb | Cambrian (Furongian) | | Canada | | |
| Eccaparadoxides? thorslundi | Sp. nov | Valid | Rushton, Weidner & Ebbestad | Cambrian | | Sweden | A member of Paradoxididae of uncertain phylogenetic placement, possibly a species of Eccaparadoxides. | |
| Echidnops taphomimus | Sp. nov | Valid | Rustán & Balseiro | Early Devonian | Talacasto Formation | Argentina | | |
| Effnaspis clavata | Sp. nov | Valid | Zhou, Zhou & Xiang | Ordovician | Pagoda Formation | China | | |
| Eiluroides | Gen. et sp. nov | Valid | Yuan & Zhu in Yuan, Zhang & Zhu | Cambrian | | China | A member of the family Menocephalidae. Genus includes new species E. triangula. | |
| Encrinurella latifrons | Sp. nov | Valid | Zhou, Zhou & Xiang | Ordovician | Pagoda Formation | China | | |
| Enigmapyge | Gen. et sp. nov | Valid | Feist in Feist, Mahboubi & Girard | Devonian (early Famennian) | "Argiles de Marhouma" Formation | Algeria | A member of Phacopidae. The type species is E. marhoumensis. | |
| Eosoptychoparia truncata | Sp. nov | Valid | Yuan & Zhu in Yuan, Zhang & Zhu | Cambrian | | China | A member of the family Ptychopariidae. | |
| Erratojincella convexa | Sp. nov | Valid | Yuan & Zhang in Yuan, Zhang & Zhu | Cambrian | | China | A member of the family Solenopleuridae. | |
| Erratojincella lata | Sp. nov | Valid | Yuan & Zhang in Yuan, Zhang & Zhu | Cambrian | | China | A member of the family Solenopleuridae. | |
| Erratojincella? truncata | Sp. nov | Valid | Yuan & Zhang in Yuan, Zhang & Zhu | Cambrian | | China | A member of the family Solenopleuridae. | |
| Erytheia | Gen. et comb. nov | Valid | Geyer | Cambrian | | Poland | A member of Chengkouiidae. Genus includes "Micmacca" klimontowi Orłowski (1985). | |
| Eugonocare? phillipi | Sp. nov | Valid | Chatterton & Gibb | Cambrian (Furongian) | | Canada | | |
| Forchhammeria insueta | Sp. nov | Valid | Salikhova in Pegel et al. | Cambrian | | Russia | A member of Asaphida belonging to the family Anomocaridae. | |
| Gaindella | Gen. et sp. nov | Valid | Pegel in Pegel et al. | Cambrian | | Russia | A member of Asaphida belonging to the family Pterocephaliidae. The type species is G. angusta. | |
| Galbagnostus obscurus | Sp. nov | Valid | Zhou, Zhou & Yin | Ordovician (Darriwilian) | Zhuozishan Formation | China | | |
| Geesops fabrei | Sp. nov | Valid | Khaldi et al. | Early Devonian | 'Chefar el Ahmar' Formation | Algeria | A phacopid. Originally described as a species of Geesops; Van Viersen, Holland & Koppka (2017) transferred the species to the genus Adrisiops. | |
| Gymnagnostus kobayashii | Sp. nov | Valid | Tortello & Esteban | Ordovician (Tremadocian) | Santa Rosita Formation | Argentina | | |
| Hadromeros hunanensis | Sp. nov | Valid | Zhou, Zhou & Xiang | Ordovician | Pagoda Formation | China | | |
| Haibowania brevis | Sp. nov | Valid | Yuan in Yuan, Zhang & Zhu | Cambrian | | China | A member of the family Damesellidae. | |
| Helanshanaspis | Gen. et sp. nov | Valid | Yuan & Zhang in Yuan, Zhang & Zhu | Cambrian | | China | A member of the family Ptychopariidae. Genus includes new species H. abrota. | |
| Hexacopyge scopulata | Sp. nov | Valid | Zhou, Zhou & Xiang | Ordovician | Pagoda Formation | China | | |
| Holdenia liangshanensis | Sp. nov | Valid | Zhou, Zhou & Xiang | Ordovician | Pagoda Formation | China | | |
| Hydrocephalus spinulosus | Sp. nov | Valid | Rushton, Weidner & Ebbestad | Cambrian | | Sweden | A member of Paradoxididae. | |
| Hyperoparia linquanensis | Sp. nov | Valid | Yuan & Zhang in Yuan, Zhang & Zhu | Cambrian | | China | A member of the family Solenopleuridae. | |
| Iguidiella | Gen. et sp. nov | Valid | Geyer | Cambrian | | | A member of Chengkouiidae. Genus includes new species I. schaeri. | |
| Illaenoscutellum psephos | Sp. nov | Valid | Holloway & Lane | Silurian | Tomcat Creek limestone | Australia | | |
| Illaenus slancyensis | Sp. nov | Valid | Krylov | Ordovician | Kukruse Formation | Russia | | |
| Inouyia (Bulbinouyia) lata | Sp. nov | Valid | Yuan & Zhang in Yuan, Zhang & Zhu | Cambrian | | China | | |
| Inouyia (Sulcinouyia) | Subgen. et 2 sp. nov | Valid | Yuan & Zhang in Yuan, Zhang & Zhu | Cambrian | | China | A member of the family Inouyiidae. The subgenus includes new species I. rara and I. rectangulata. | |
| Iotoryx | Gen. et sp. nov | Valid | Holloway & Lane | Silurian | Tomcat Creek limestone | Australia | A member of Scutelluidae. Genus includes new species I. clarksoni. | |
| Iranoleesia (Iranoleesia) angustata | Sp. nov | Valid | Yuan & Zhang in Yuan, Zhang & Zhu | Cambrian | | China | A member of Ptychopariida belonging to the family Proasaphiscidae. | |
| Iranoleesia (Proasaphiscina) microspina | Sp. nov | Valid | Yuan & Zhang in Yuan, Zhang & Zhu | Cambrian | | China | A member of Ptychopariida belonging to the family Proasaphiscidae. | |
| Iranoleesia (Proasaphiscina) pustulosa | Sp. nov | Valid | Yuan & Zhang in Yuan, Zhang & Zhu | Cambrian | | China | A member of Ptychopariida belonging to the family Proasaphiscidae. | |
| Irbuklina | Gen. et 2 sp. nov | Valid | Egorova in Pegel et al. | Cambrian | | Russia | A member of Asaphida of uncertain phylogenetic placement. The type species is I. candida; genus also includes I. rigida. | |
| Irvingella dawnae | Sp. nov | Valid | Chatterton & Gibb | Cambrian (Furongian) | | Canada | | |
| Irvingella lata | Sp. nov | Valid | Chatterton & Gibb | Cambrian (Furongian) | | Canada | | |
| Irvingella orrensis | Sp. nov | Valid | Westrop & Adrain | Cambrian | Orr Formation | United States | | |
| Japonoscutellum drakton | Sp. nov | Valid | Holloway & Lane | Silurian | Tomcat Creek limestone | Australia | | |
| Japonoscutellum fractum | Sp. nov | Valid | Holloway & Lane | Silurian | Tomcat Creek limestone | Australia | | |
| Japonoscutellum mawsonae | Sp. nov | Valid | Holloway & Lane | Silurian | Tomcat Creek limestone | Australia | | |
| Jiangsucephalus suaigouensis | Sp. nov | Valid | Yuan & Zhang in Yuan, Zhang & Zhu | Cambrian | | China | A member of the family Proasaphiscidae. | |
| Jinxiaspis rara | Sp. nov | Valid | Zhu & Yuan in Yuan, Zhang & Zhu | Cambrian | | China | A member of the family Anomocaridae. | |
| Juliaspis convexa | Sp. nov | Valid | Pegel in Pegel et al. | Cambrian | | Russia | A member of Ptychopariida belonging to the family Namanoiidae. | |
| Kanlingia mirabilis | Sp. nov | Valid | Zhou, Zhou & Xiang | Ordovician | Pagoda Formation | China | | |
| Kanlingia reshiensis | Sp. nov | Valid | Zhou, Zhou & Xiang | Ordovician | Pagoda Formation | China | | |
| Kanlingia rhombica | Sp. nov | Valid | Zhou, Zhou & Yin | Ordovician (Darriwilian) | Zhuozishan Formation | China | | |
| Kendallina greenensis | Sp. nov | Valid | Chatterton & Gibb | Cambrian (Furongian) | | Canada | | |
| Kindbladia wilsoni | Sp. nov | Valid | Chatterton & Gibb | Cambrian (Furongian) | | Canada | | |
| Kodymaspis expansa | Sp. nov | Valid | Zhou, Zhou & Xiang | Ordovician | Pagoda Formation | China | | |
| Kodymaspis maocaopuensis | Sp. nov | Valid | Zhou, Zhou & Xiang | Ordovician | Pagoda Formation | China | | |
| Koneprusia martini | Sp. nov | Valid | Basse & Müller | Devonian (Emsian) | Rupbach Shale | Germany | | |
| Kosovopeltis avita | Sp. nov | Valid | Holloway & Lane | Silurian | Tomcat Creek limestone | Australia | | |
| Lamproscutellum scoparium | Sp. nov | Valid | Zhou, Zhou & Xiang | Ordovician | Pagoda Formation | China | | |
| Leiolonchodomas | Gen. et sp. nov | Valid | Zhou, Zhou & Xiang | Ordovician | Pagoda Formation | China | Genus includes new species L. dangmengouensis. | |
| Lenacare sentum | Sp. nov | Valid | Salikhova in Pegel et al. | Cambrian | | Russia | A member of Ptychopariida belonging to the family Alokistocaridae. | |
| Lianglangshania transversa | Sp. nov | Valid | Zhu in Yuan, Zhang & Zhu | Cambrian | | China | A member of the family Anomocaridae. | |
| Linguagnostus aldanicus | Sp. nov | Valid | Makarova & Bushuev | Cambrian | Chaya Formation | Russia | A member of Diplagnostidae. | |
| Lioaspis | Gen. et sp. nov | Valid | Lazarenko & Salikhova in Pegel et al. | Cambrian | | Russia | A member of Ptychopariida belonging to the family Asaphiscidae. The type species is L. infida. | |
| Lioparella suyukouensis | Sp. nov | Valid | Yuan & Zhang in Yuan, Zhang & Zhu | Cambrian | | China | A member of Ptychopariida belonging to the family Proasaphiscidae. | |
| Liopeishania (Liopeishania) lata | Sp. nov | Valid | Yuan in Yuan, Zhang & Zhu | Cambrian | | China | A member of the family Anomocarellidae. | |
| Liopeishania (Zhujia) zhuozishanensis | Sp. nov | Valid | Yuan in Yuan, Zhang & Zhu | Cambrian | | China | A member of the family Anomocarellidae. | |
| Liopeishaniella | Gen. et comb. nov | Valid | Bentley, Jago & Cooper | Cambrian (Drumian) | | Antarctica (Victoria Land) | A polymerid trilobite. Genus includes "Liopeishania" angusta Wolfart (1994). | |
| Liopelta paula | Sp. nov | Valid | Salikhova in Pegel et al. | Cambrian | | Russia | A member of Ptychopariida belonging to the family Anomocarellidae. | |
| Liquanella | Gen. et sp. nov | Valid | Yuan & Zhang in Yuan, Zhang & Zhu | Cambrian | | China | A member of the family Asaphiscidae. Genus includes new species L. venusta. | |
| Lisania subaigouensis | Sp. nov | Valid | Yuan in Yuan, Zhang & Zhu | Cambrian | | China | | |
| Lisania zhuozishanensis | Sp. nov | Valid | Yuan & Zhu in Yuan, Zhang & Zhu | Cambrian | | China | | |
| Lisogorites yaoi | Sp. nov | Valid | Zhou, Zhou & Yin | Ordovician (Darriwilian) | Zhuozishan Formation | China | An asaphid. | |
| Lonchocheirurus | Gen. et comb. nov | Valid | Zhou, Zhou & Xiang | Ordovician | Pagoda Formation | China | Genus includes L. sinicus (Lu, 1975). | |
| Lonchodomas yichongiaoensis | Sp. nov | Valid | Zhou, Zhou & Xiang | Ordovician | Pagoda Formation | China | | |
| Luaspides? quadrata | Sp. nov | Valid | Yuan & Zhang in Yuan, Zhang & Zhu | Cambrian | | China | | |
| Megagraulos longispinifer | Sp. nov | Valid | Zhu in Yuan, Zhang & Zhu | Cambrian | | China | A member of Ptychopariida belonging to the family Wuaniidae. | |
| Metayuepingia riccardii | Sp. nov | Valid | Tortello & Esteban | Ordovician (Tremadocian) | Santa Rosita Formation | Argentina | | |
| Microparia (Heterocyclopyge) obsoleta | Sp. nov | Valid | Zhou, Zhou & Xiang | Ordovician | Pagoda Formation | China | | |
| Microparia (Heterocyclopyge) taoyuanensis | Sp. nov | Valid | Zhou, Zhou & Xiang | Ordovician | Pagoda Formation | China | | |
| Mioptychopyge semicircula | Sp. nov | Valid | Zhou, Zhou & Yin | Ordovician (Darriwilian) | Zhuozishan Formation | China | An asaphid. | |
| Monanocephalus reticulatus | Sp. nov | Valid | Yuan & Zhu in Yuan, Zhang & Zhu | Cambrian | | China | A member of Ptychopariida belonging to the family Cedariidae. | |
| Monanocephalus taosigouensis | Sp. nov | Valid | Yuan & Zhang in Yuan, Zhang & Zhu | Cambrian | | China | A member of Ptychopariida belonging to the family Cedariidae. | |
| Nileus cingolanii | Sp. nov | Valid | Tortello & Esteban | Ordovician (Tremadocian) | Santa Rosita Formation | Argentina | | |
| Nileus erici | Sp. nov | Valid | Tortello & Esteban | Ordovician (Tremadocian) | Santa Rosita Formation | Argentina | | |
| Niuchangella angustilimbata | Sp. nov | Valid | Zhou, Zhou & Xiang | Ordovician | Pagoda Formation | China | | |
| Niuchangella yuanbaensis | Sp. nov | Valid | Zhou, Zhou & Xiang | Ordovician | Pagoda Formation | China | | |
| Niuxinshania | Gen. et sp. nov | Valid | Yuan & Zhang in Yuan, Zhang & Zhu | Cambrian | | China | A member of the family Crepicephalidae. Genus includes new species N. longxianensis. | |
| Occatharia dongshankouensis | Sp. nov | Valid | Yuan & Zhang in Yuan, Zhang & Zhu | Cambrian | | China | A member of the family Conocoryphidae. Transferred to the genus Bailiella by Geyer (2024). | |
| Oedicybele caeca | Sp. nov | Valid | Zhou, Zhou & Xiang | Ordovician | Pagoda Formation | China | | |
| Ogygiocaris? iruyensis | Sp. nov | Valid | Tortello & Esteban | Ordovician (Tremadocian) | Santa Rosita Formation | Argentina | | |
| Olenaspella chrisnewi | Sp. nov | Valid | Chatterton & Gibb | Cambrian (Furongian) | | Canada | | |
| Olenoides longus | Sp. nov | Valid | Zhu & Yuan in Yuan, Zhang & Zhu | Cambrian | | China | | |
| Olenoides sassikaspa | Sp. nov | Valid | Bentley, Jago & Cooper | Cambrian (Drumian) | | Antarctica (Victoria Land) | | |
| Onychopyge acenolazai | Sp. nov | Valid | Tortello & Esteban | Ordovician (Tremadocian) | Santa Rosita Formation | Argentina | | |
| Onychopyge gonzalezae | Sp. nov | Valid | Tortello & Esteban | Ordovician (Tremadocian) | Santa Rosita Formation | Argentina | | |
| Opsypharus pandanensis | Sp. nov | Valid | Holloway & Lane | Silurian | Tomcat Creek limestone | Australia | | |
| Orientanomocare | Gen. et sp. nov | Valid | Yuan & Zhang in Yuan, Zhang & Zhu | Cambrian | | China | A member of the family Anomocarellidae. Genus includes new species O. elegans. | |
| Orygmaspis (Parabolinoides) doriansmithi | Sp. nov | Valid | Chatterton & Gibb | Cambrian (Furongian) | | Canada | | |
| Orygmaspis (Parabolinoides) jenkinsi | Sp. nov | Valid | Chatterton & Gibb | Cambrian (Furongian) | | Canada | | |
| Orygmaspis (Parabolinoides) mckellari | Sp. nov | Valid | Chatterton & Gibb | Cambrian (Furongian) | | Canada | | |
| Orygmaspis (Parabolinoides) medispina | Sp. nov | Valid | Chatterton & Gibb | Cambrian (Furongian) | | Canada | | |
| Orygmaspis (Parabolinoides) morrisi | Sp. nov | Valid | Chatterton & Gibb | Cambrian (Furongian) | | Canada | | |
| Otarion fugitivum | Sp. nov | Valid | McNamara & Feist | Devonian (Frasnian) | Virgin Hills Formation | Australia | A proetid, a species of Otarion. | |
| Ovalocephalus pyriformis | Sp. nov | Valid | Zhou, Zhou & Xiang | Ordovician | Pagoda Formation | China | | |
| Ovalocephalus shaanxiensis | Sp. nov | Valid | Zhou, Zhou & Xiang | Ordovician | Pagoda Formation | China | | |
| Palaeosunaspis | Gen. et sp. nov | Valid | Yuan & Zhang in Yuan, Zhang & Zhu | Cambrian | | China | A member of the family Sunaspidae. Genus includes new species P. latilimbata. | |
| Panderia acutata | Sp. nov | Valid | Zhou, Zhou & Xiang | Ordovician | Pagoda Formation | China | | |
| Panderia lubrica | Sp. nov | Valid | Zhou, Zhou & Yin | Ordovician (Darriwilian) | Zhuozishan Formation | China | | |
| Parabolinella clarisae | Sp. nov | Valid | Monti, del Huerto Benítez & Ramirez | Ordovician (Tremadocian) | | Argentina | A member of Olenidae. | |
| Parabolinella pompadouris | Sp. nov | Valid | Monti, del Huerto Benítez & Ramirez | Ordovician (Tremadocian) | | Argentina | A member of Olenidae. | |
| Paraperaspis striolatus | Sp. nov | Valid | Zhou, Zhou & Xiang | Ordovician | Pagoda Formation | China | | |
| Paraphillipsinella ciliensis | Sp. nov | Valid | Zhou, Zhou & Xiang | Ordovician | Pagoda Formation | China | | |
| Pararemopleurides | Gen. et 3 sp. nov | Valid | Zhou, Zhou & Xiang | Ordovician | Pagoda Formation | China | Genus includes new species P. longispinus, P. schizophyllus and P. shaanxiensis. | |
| Parashanxiella | Gen. et 2 sp. nov | Valid | Yuan & Zhang in Yuan, Zhang & Zhu | Cambrian | | China | A member of the family Proasaphiscidae. Genus includes new species P. flabellata and P. lubrica. | |
| Paraszeaspis | Gen. et sp. nov | Valid | Yuan & Zhang in Yuan, Zhang & Zhu | Cambrian | | China | A member of the family Ignotogregatidae. Genus includes new species P. quadratus. | |
| Parayujinia convexa | Sp. nov | Valid | Yuan & Zhang in Yuan, Zhang & Zhu | Cambrian | | China | A member of the family Lisaniidae. | |
| Parillaenus xui | Sp. nov | Valid | Zhou, Zhou & Xiang | Ordovician | Pagoda Formation | China | | |
| Pelitlina? corbachoi | Sp. nov | Valid | Basse & Müller | Early Devonian | | Spain | A member of the family Acastidae. Subsequently, made the type species of the genus Alatacastava by van Viersen & Müller (2024). | |
| Perizostra | Gen. et sp. nov | Valid | Holloway & Lane | Silurian | Tomcat Creek limestone | Australia | A member of Scutelluidae. Genus includes new species P. campbelli. | |
| Phacops boudjemaai | Sp. nov | Valid | Khaldi et al. | Early Devonian | 'Chefar el Ahmar' Formation | Algeria | A phacopid. Originally described as a species of Phacops; Van Viersen, Holland & Koppka (2017) transferred the species to the genus Adrisiops. | |
| Platypeltoides hammondi | Sp. nov | Valid | Corbacho & López-Soriano | Ordovician (late Tremadocian) | Fezouata formation | Morocco | A nileid. | |
| Plesioperiomma triangulata | Sp. nov | Valid | Yuan & Zhang in Yuan, Zhang & Zhu | Cambrian | | China | | |
| Poulsenia venusta | Sp. nov | Valid | Pegel in Pegel et al. | Cambrian | | Russia | A member of Ptychopariida belonging to the family Ptychopariidae. | |
| Proasaphiscus pustulosus | Sp. nov | Valid | Yuan & Zhu in Yuan, Zhang & Zhu | Cambrian | | China | | |
| Proasaphiscus zhuozishanensis | Sp. nov | Valid | Yuan & Zhu in Yuan, Zhang & Zhu | Cambrian | | China | | |
| Prolisania | Gen. et sp. nov | Valid | Yuan & Zhu in Yuan, Zhang & Zhu | Cambrian | | China | A member of the family Lisaniidae. Genus includes new species P. neimengguensis. | |
| Pseudocrepicephalus angustilimbatus | Sp. nov | Valid | Zhu in Yuan, Zhang & Zhu | Cambrian | | China | | |
| Pseudopetigurus yuandunensis | Sp. nov | Valid | Zhou, Zhou & Xiang | Ordovician | Pagoda Formation | China | | |
| Psilaspis affinis | Sp. nov | Valid | Zhu & Yuan in Yuan, Zhang & Zhu | Cambrian | | China | | |
| Psilaspis dongshankouensis | Sp. nov | Valid | Zhu & Yuan in Yuan, Zhang & Zhu | Cambrian | | China | | |
| Psychopyge angeles | Sp. nov | Valid | Basse & Müller | Devonian (Emsian) | | Morocco | | |
| Qianlishania | Gen. et 3 sp. nov | Valid | Yuan & Zhang in Yuan, Zhang & Zhu | Cambrian | | China | A member of the family Solenopleuridae. Genus includes new species Q. conica, Q. longispina and Q. megalocephala. | |
| Quintonia | Gen. et 2 sp. nov | Valid | Holloway & Lane | Silurian | Tomcat Creek limestone | Australia | A member of Scutelluidae. Genus includes new species Q. arata and Q. pavo. | |
| Rasettiella | Gen. et comb. et 2 sp. nov | Junior homonym | Wernette & Westrop | Cambrian | | Canada | A dolichometopid. Genus includes species previously assigned to the genus Bathyuriscidella, as well as Rasettiella lupiae and Rasettiella sorgehanarum. The generic name is preoccupied by Rasettiella Özdikmen (2005). | |
| Rhenocynproetus vanvierseni | Sp. nov | Valid | Basse & Müller | Devonian (Emsian) | Rupbach Shale | Germany | | |
| Rickardsia | Gen. et comb. nov | Valid | Storey, Thomas & Owens | Silurian | | Czech Republic; Sweden; United Kingdom | A member of Dalmanitidae. The type species is "Dalmanites" mobergi Hede (1915); genus also includes "Delops" dermolac Šnajdr (1981) and "Phacops (Dalmania)" nobilis Thomas (1900). | |
| Rina? mayskaya | Sp. nov | Valid | Bushuev & Makarova | Cambrian | Chaya Formation | Russia | A member of Solenopleuridae. | |
| Rorringtonia conica | Sp. nov | Valid | Zhou, Zhou & Xiang | Ordovician | Pagoda Formation | China | | |
| Rorringtonia minuta | Sp. nov | Valid | Zhou, Zhou & Xiang | Ordovician | Pagoda Formation | China | | |
| Rorringtonia obsoleta | Sp. nov | Valid | Zhou, Zhou & Xiang | Ordovician | Pagoda Formation | China | | |
| Rotundampyx | Gen. et sp. nov | Valid | Zhou, Zhou & Yin | Ordovician (Darriwilian) | Zhuozishan Formation | China | A raphiophorid. Genus includes new species R. lasengmiaoensis. | |
| Ryaneyreus | Gen. et sp. nov | Valid | Chatterton & Gibb | Cambrian (Furongian) | | Canada | A member of the family Parabolinoididae. Genus includes news species R. zoeae. | |
| Sagavia obscura | Sp. nov | Valid | Zhou, Zhou & Xiang | Ordovician | Pagoda Formation | China | | |
| Scabriscutellum (Rheiscutellum) | Subgen. nov | Valid | Basse & Müller | Devonian (Emsian) | Rupbach Shale | Germany | | |
| Sciaspis | Gen. et sp. nov | Valid | Zhu in Yuan, Zhang & Zhu | Cambrian | | China | A member of the family Ordosiidae. Genus includes new species S. brachyacanthus. | |
| Shanxiella (Shanxiella) xiweikouensis | Sp. nov | Valid | Yuan & Zhang in Yuan, Zhang & Zhu | Cambrian | | China | | |
| Sibirolenus | Gen. et comb. nov | Valid | Geyer | Cambrian | | Russia | A member of Palaeolenidae; a new genus for "Micmacca" enormis. | |
| Sinoanomocare | Gen. et sp. nov | Valid | Yuan & Zhang in Yuan, Zhang & Zhu | Cambrian | | China | A member of the family Anomocaridae. Genus includes new species S. lirellatus. | |
| Sinopagetia longxianensis | Sp. nov | Valid | Yuan & Zhang in Yuan, Zhang & Zhu | Cambrian | | China | | |
| Solenoparia (Solenoparia) accedens | Sp. nov | Valid | Yuan & Zhang in Yuan, Zhang & Zhu | Cambrian | | China | | |
| Solenoparia (Solenoparia) subcylindrica | Sp. nov | Valid | Yuan in Yuan, Zhang & Zhu | Cambrian | | China | | |
| Solenoparops neimengguensis | Sp. nov | Valid | Yuan & Zhu in Yuan, Zhang & Zhu | Cambrian | | China | | |
| Solenoparops taosigouensis | Sp. nov | Valid | Yuan & Zhang in Yuan, Zhang & Zhu | Cambrian | | China | | |
| Squarrosoella dongshankouensis | Sp. nov | Valid | Yuan & Zhang in Yuan, Zhang & Zhu | Cambrian | | China | | |
| Strictaspis | Gen. et sp. nov | Valid | Lazarenko & Salikhova in Pegel et al. | Cambrian | | Russia | A member of Ptychopariida belonging to the family Asaphiscidae. The type species is S. leve. | |
| Sulcipagetia | Gen. et sp. nov | Valid | Yuan & Zhang in Yuan, Zhang & Zhu | Cambrian | | China | A member of the family Eodiscidae. Genus includes new species S. gangdeershanensis. | |
| Sunaspidella transversa | Sp. nov | Valid | Yuan & Zhang in Yuan, Zhang & Zhu | Cambrian | | China | | |
| Taenicephalus leei | Sp. nov | Valid | Chatterton & Gibb | Cambrian (Furongian) | | Canada | | |
| Taenicephalus westropi | Sp. nov | Valid | Chatterton & Gibb | Cambrian (Furongian) | | Canada | | |
| Taitzuina transversa | Sp. nov | Valid | Yuan & Zhang in Yuan, Zhang & Zhu | Cambrian | | China | | |
| Tanglefootia | Gen. et sp. nov | Valid | Chatterton & Gibb | Cambrian (Furongian) | | Canada | A member of the family Cheilocephalidae. Genus includes new species T. calvini. | |
| Taosigouia | Gen. et comb. nov | Valid | Yuan & Zhang in Yuan, Zhang & Zhu | Cambrian | | China | A member of the family Anomocarellidae. Genus includes T. cylindrica (Li in Zhou et al., 1982) | |
| Teinistion triangulus | Sp. nov | Valid | Yuan in Yuan, Zhang & Zhu | Cambrian | | China | | |
| Telephina truncata | Sp. nov | Valid | Zhou, Zhou & Xiang | Ordovician | Pagoda Formation | China | | |
| Telopeltis intermedia | Sp. nov | Valid | McNamara & Feist | Devonian (Frasnian) | Virgin Hills Formation | Australia | A species of Telopeltis. | |
| Tengfengia (Tengfengia) granulata | Sp. nov | Valid | Yuan & Zhang in Yuan, Zhang & Zhu | Cambrian | | China | A member of Ptychopariida belonging to the family Tengfengiidae. | |
| Tengfengia (Tengfengia) striata | Sp. nov | Valid | Yuan & Zhang in Yuan, Zhang & Zhu | Cambrian | | China | A member of Ptychopariida belonging to the family Tengfengiidae. | |
| Tetraceroura transversa | Sp. nov | Valid | Yuan & Zhu in Yuan, Zhang & Zhu | Cambrian | | China | A member of Ptychopariida belonging to the family Crepicephalidae. | |
| Tomagnostus apertus | Sp. nov | Valid | Makarova & Bushuev | Cambrian | Chaya Formation | Russia | A member of Ptychagnostidae. | |
| Tongxinaspis ovata | Sp. nov | Valid | Zhou, Zhou & Yin | Ordovician (Darriwilian) | Zhuozishan Formation | China | A dionidid. | |
| Torleyiscutellum | Gen. et sp. nov | Valid | Basse, Koch & Lemke | Devonian (early Givetian) | | Germany | A scutelluid trilobite. Genus includes new species T. herwigorum. | |
| Trifoliops cronierae | Sp. nov | Valid | Feist in Feist, Mahboubi & Girard | Late Devonian | "Argiles de Marhouma" Formation | Algeria | A member of Phacopidae. | |
| Trimerocephalus mahboubii | Sp. nov | Valid | Feist in Feist, Mahboubi & Girard | Late Devonian | "Argiles de Marhouma" Formation | Algeria | A member of Phacopidae. | |
| Tropidocoryphe werneri | Sp. nov | Valid | Basse & Müller | Devonian (Emsian) | Rupbach Shale | Germany | | |
| Tylotaitzuia truncata | Sp. nov | Valid | Zhu in Yuan, Zhang & Zhu | Cambrian | | China | | |
| Ulakhanella triangula | Sp. nov | Valid | Pegel in Pegel et al. | Cambrian | | Russia | A member of Ptychopariida belonging to the family Palaeolenidae. | |
| Verkholenoides cognatus | Sp. nov | Valid | Pegel & Salikhova in Pegel et al. | Cambrian | | Russia | A member of Asaphida belonging to the family Pterocephaliidae. | |
| Vicnepea | Gen. et sp. nov | Valid | Bentley, Jago & Cooper | Cambrian (Drumian) | | Antarctica (Victoria Land) | A polymerid trilobite. Genus includes new species V. patersoni . | |
| Wuhaiaspis | Gen. et. 2 sp. nov | Valid | Yuan & Zhang in Yuan, Zhang & Zhu | Cambrian | | China | A member of the family Ptychopariidae. Genus includes new species W. convexa and W. longispina. | |
| Wuhushania claviformis | Sp. nov | Valid | Yuan & Zhang in Yuan, Zhang & Zhu | Cambrian | | China | | |
| Wujiajiania lyndasmithae | Sp. nov | Valid | Chatterton & Gibb | Cambrian (Furongian) | | Canada | | |
| Wujiajiania ricksmithi | Sp. nov | Valid | Chatterton & Gibb | Cambrian (Furongian) | | Canada | | |
| Yanshaniashania angustigenata | Sp. nov | Valid | Zhu & Zhang in Yuan, Zhang & Zhu | Cambrian | | China | | |

== Other arthropods ==
=== Research ===
- A description of the ventral nerve cord in the early Cambrian euarthropod Chengjiangocaris kunmingensis is published by Yang et al. (2016).
- A three-dimensionally preserved larva of Leanchoilia illecebrosa is described by Liu et al. (2016).
- A study of the eye anatomy of the thylacocephalan (an arthropod of uncertain phylogenetic placement, possibly crustacean) Dollocaris is published by Vannier et al. (2016).
- A study on the ability of bradoriid arthropods to close the shields of their carapace is published by Betts, Brock & Paterson (2016).
- A study on the morphology of the digestive system and taphonomy of a variety of specimens of the Cambrian arthropod Campanamuta mantonae, known from the Sirius Passet Lagerstätte (Greenland), is published by Strang, Armstrong & Harper (2016).

=== New taxa ===
| Name | Novelty | Status | Authors | Age | Unit | Location | Notes | Images |
|---|---|---|---|---|---|---|---|---|
| Acanthomeridion anacanthus | Sp. nov | Disputed | Hou et al. | Early Cambrian | | China | Considered to be a junior synonym of Acanthomeridion serratum by Du et al. (2023). | |
| Agnostotes weugi | Sp. nov | Valid | Chatterton & Gibb | Cambrian (Furongian) | | Canada | A member of Agnostida. | |
| Aquilonifer | Gen. et sp. nov | Valid | Briggs et al. | Silurian (late Wenlock) | Herefordshire Lagerstätte | United Kingdom | A stem-mandibulate. The type species is Aquilonifer spinosus. | |
| Archeallacma | Gen. et sp. nov | Valid | Sánchez-García & Engel | Early Cretaceous | | Spain | A springtail belonging to the family Sminthuridae. The type species is A. dolichopoda. | |
| Brachyaglaspis | Gen. et sp. nov | Valid | Ortega-Hernández, Van Roy & Lerosey-Aubril | Ordovician (middle Floian) | Fezouata Konservat-Lagerstätte | Morocco | A member of Aglaspidida. The type species is Brachyaglaspis singularis. | |
| Burmisotoma spinulifera | Sp. nov | Valid | Sánchez-García & Engel | Early Cretaceous (late Albian) | Utrillas Group | Spain | A springtail belonging to the family Isotomidae. | |
| Clypecaris serrata | Sp. nov | Valid | Yang et al. | Cambrian | Hongjingshao Formation | China | A member of Deuteropoda of uncertain phylogenetic placement. | |
| Cretokatianna | Gen. et sp. nov | Valid | Sánchez-García & Engel | Early Cretaceous | | Spain | A springtail belonging to the family Katiannidae. The type species is C. bucculenta. | |
| Decoracaris | Gen. et sp. nov | Valid | Briggs et al. | Ordovician (Darriwilian) | Winneshiek Lagerstätte | United States | A bivalved arthropod of uncertain phylogenetic placement, possibly a thylacocephalan. The type species is Decoracaris hildebrandi. | |
| Dyrnwynia | Gen. et sp. nov | Valid | Legg | Ordovician (middle Darriwilian) | Llanfallteg Formation | United Kingdom | A member of Marrellida. The type species is Dyrnwynia conollyi. | |
| Enosiaspis | Gen. et sp. nov | Valid | Legg | Ordovician (Tremadocian) | Fezouata Formation | Morocco | A marrellomorph belonging to the group Acercostraca. The type species is Enosiaspis hrungnir. | |
| Hipponicharion pearylandica | Sp. nov | Valid | Peel et al. | Cambrian | Henson Gletscher Formation | Greenland | A member of Bradoriida. Originally described as a species of Hipponicharion; subsequently made the type species of a separate genus Navarana. | |
| Iosuperstes | Gen. et sp. nov | Valid | Briggs et al. | Ordovician (Darriwilian) | Winneshiek Lagerstätte | United States | A bivalved arthropod of uncertain phylogenetic placement. The type species is Iosuperstes collisionis. | |
| Katiannasminthurus | Gen. et sp. nov | Valid | Sánchez-García & Engel | Early Cretaceous | | Spain | A springtail, possibly a member of the family Sminthuridae. The type species is K. xenopygus. | |
| Liangshanella? nivalis | Sp. nov | Valid | Peel et al. | Cambrian | Henson Gletscher Formation | Greenland | A member of Bradoriida. | |
| Paleolimulus woodae | Sp. nov | Valid | Lerner, Lucas & Mansky | Carboniferous (Tournaisian) | Horton Bluff Formation | Canada | A member of Xiphosura belonging to the family Paleolimulidae. Originally described as a species of Paleolimulus, but subsequently transferred to the genus Norilimulus. | |
| Proisotoma communis | Sp. nov | Valid | Sánchez-García & Engel | Early Cretaceous (late Albian) | Utrillas Group | Spain | A springtail belonging to the family Isotomidae. | |
| Protoisotoma autrigoniensis | Sp. nov | Valid | Sánchez-García & Engel | Early Cretaceous (late Albian) | Utrillas Group | Spain | A springtail belonging to the family Isotomidae. | |
| Pseudosminthurides | Gen. et sp. nov | Valid | Sánchez-García & Engel | Early Cretaceous | | Spain | A springtail belonging to the family Sminthurididae. The type species is P. stoechus. | |
| Skryjagnostus usitatus | Sp. nov | Valid | Salikhova in Pegel et al. | Cambrian | | Russia | A member of Agnostida (a group of arthropods of uncertain phylogenetic placement, possibly trilobites). | |
| Sphyrotheciscus | Gen. et sp. nov | Valid | Sánchez-García & Engel | Early Cretaceous | | Spain | A springtail belonging to the family Sminthuridae. The type species is S. senectus. | |
| Tomagnostus brantevikensis | Sp. nov | Valid | Weidner & Nielsen | Middle Cambrian | Alum Shale Formation | Sweden | A member of Agnostida belonging to the family Ptychagnostidae. | |
| Wisangocaris | Gen. et sp. nov | Valid | Jago, García-Bellido & Gehling | Early Cambrian | Emu Bay Shale | Australia | A member of Chelicerata sharing many overall body features with Sanctacaris. The type species is Wisangocaris barbarahardyae. | |
