= Cytherideis =

Cytherideis Temporal range: 41.3–11.61 Ma

Scientific classification
- Domain: Eukaryota
- Kingdom: Animalia
- Phylum: Arthropoda
- Class: Ostracoda
- Order: Podocopida
- Family: Cytheridae
- Genus: †Cytherideis; Jones, 1856

Species
- Several, including: †Cytherideis ashermani Ulrich and Bassler 1904; †Cytherideis cylindrica Ulrich and Bassler 1904; †Cytherideis elegans Seguenza, 1885; †Cytherideis longula Ulrich & Bassler 1904; †Cytherideis semicircularis Ulrich & Bassler 1904; †Cytherideis subaequalis Ulrich and Bassler 1904

Synonyms
- †Cythere (Cytherideis) Jones, 1856

Extinct genus of seed shrimps

Cytherideis is an extinct genus of ostracods in the family Cytheridae. The genus was erected by Thomas Rupert Jones in 1856. Species are known from the Miocene of Venezuela and the Eocene of United States (Alabama).
