= Rupert Jones =

Rupert Jones may refer to

- Rupert Jones (chess player) (born 1961), Papua New Guinean chess player
- Rupert Jones (British Army officer) (born 1969), British Army officer

== See also ==
- Ruppert Jones (born 1955), American former baseball player
- Thomas Rupert Jones (1819–1911), British geologist and palaeontologist
