= C. arquata =

C. arquata may refer to:

- Centris arquata, a species of bee in the genus Centris
- Ceutorhynchus arquata, a species of beetle in the genus Ceutorhynchus
- Cichladusa arquata, a species of bird
- Cythere arquata, a species of fossil ostracod in the genus Cytheridae
