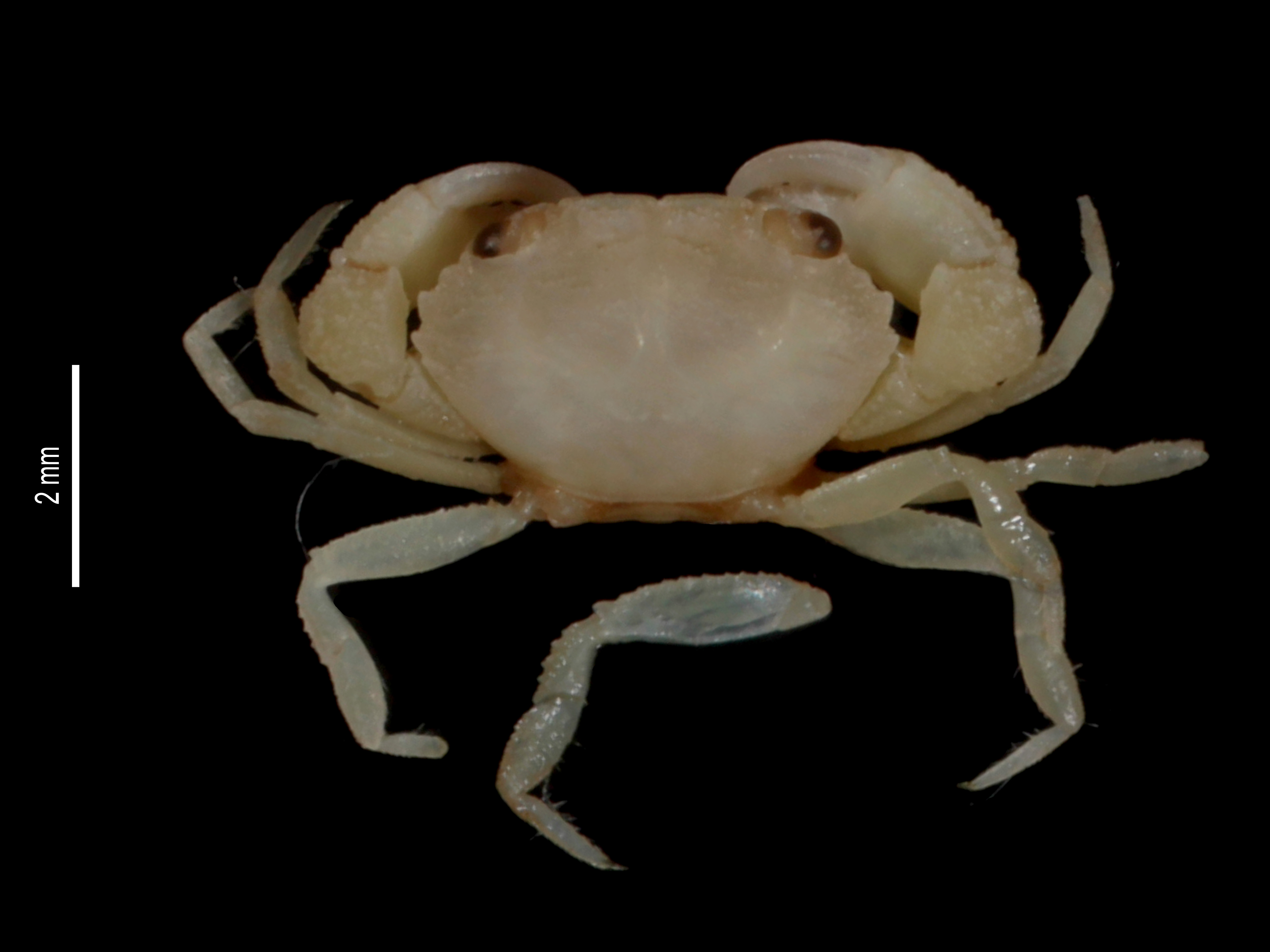

Scientific classification
- Kingdom: Animalia
- Phylum: Arthropoda
- Class: Malacostraca
- Order: Decapoda
- Suborder: Pleocyemata
- Infraorder: Brachyura
- Family: Nanocassiopidae
- Genus: Nanocassiope
- Species: N. oblonga

Binomial name
- Nanocassiope oblonga Davie, 1995

= Nanocassiope oblonga =

Species of crab

Nanocassiope oblonga is a species of crab within the family Xanthidae. It lives in the Eastern Central Pacific off the coasts of the French Polynesia islands near Nuku Hiva and Eiao, in benthic environments at depths of 140 to 155 metres (459 to 509 ft).
