= Eolepadidae =

Eolepadidae Temporal range: Triassic–Early Cretaceous

Scientific classification
- Kingdom: Animalia
- Phylum: Arthropoda
- Class: Thecostraca
- Subclass: Cirripedia
- Order: †Eolepadomorpha
- Family: †Eolepadidae; Buckeridge, 1983

Extinct family of crustaceans

Eolepadidae is an extinct family of barnacles in the order Eolepadomorpha. There are 2 genera and about 12 described species in Eolepadidae.

== Genera ==
These genera belong to the family Eolepadidae:

- †Eolepas Withers, 1928
- †Toarcolepas Gale & Schweigert, 2015
