= Phlyctenodes =

Scientific classification
- Domain: Eukaryota
- Kingdom: Animalia
- Phylum: Arthropoda
- Class: Malacostraca
- Order: Decapoda
- Suborder: Pleocyemata
- Infraorder: Brachyura
- Family: Xanthidae
- Subfamily: Actaeinae
- Genus: †Phlyctenodes; A. Milne-Edwards, 1862

Fossil genus of crabs

Phlyctenodes is an extinct genus of crabs in the family Xanthidae, containing the following fossil species:

- †Phlyctenodes dalpaizi Fabiani, 1911
- †Phlyctenodes krenneri Lorenthey, 1898
- †Phlyctenodes nicolisi Bittner, 1884
- †Phlyctenodes pustulosus A. Milne-Edwards, 1862
- †Phlyctenodes steinmanni Lorenthey, 1902
- †Phlyctenodes tuberculosus A. Milne-Edwards, 1862
