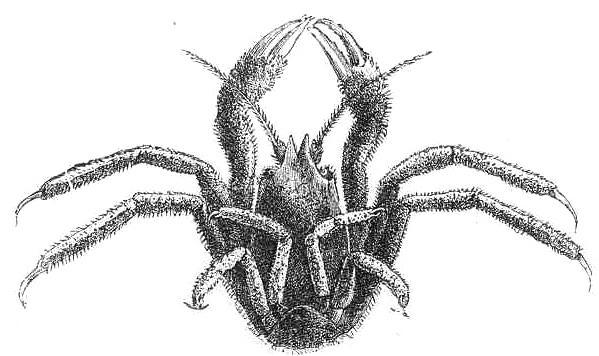

Scientific classification
- Kingdom: Animalia
- Phylum: Arthropoda
- Clade: Pancrustacea
- Class: Malacostraca
- Order: Decapoda
- Suborder: Pleocyemata
- Infraorder: Brachyura
- Section: Dromiacea
- Superfamily: Homolodromioidea; Alcock, 1899
- Family: Homolodromiidae; Alcock, 1899

Genera
- Dicranodromia; Homolodromia

Synonyms
- Homolodromidae Alcock, 1899

= Homolodromiidae =

Family of crabs

Homolodromiidae is a family of crabs, the only family in the superfamily Homolodromioidea. In contrast to other crabs, including the closely related Homolidae, there is no strong linea homolica along which the exoskeleton breaks open during ecdysis. The family comprises two genera, Dicranodromia, which has 18 species, and Homolodromia, with five species.
