= Rupert Jones (chess player) =

Papua New Guinean chess player (born 1961)

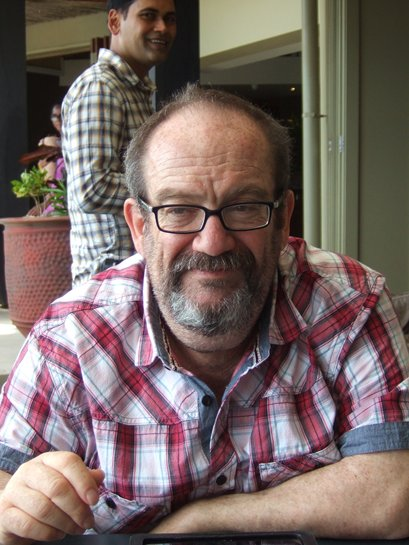
- Rupert Jones at the Oceania Chess Championship in May 2013.

Personal information
- Born: June 10, 1961 (age 65) Milne Bay District, Papua New Guinea

Chess career
- Country: Papua New Guinea
- Title: FIDE Master (2005)
- Peak rating: 1969 (July 2006)

Rupert William Jones (born June 10, 1961 in the Milne Bay District of Papua New Guinea) is a Papua New Guinean (PNG) chess FIDE Master (FM) and FIDE International Arbiter (IA). He served as the Secretary of the Botswana Chess Federation from 1986 to 1997 and in that period chess expanded to be one of the biggest participation sports in the country.

== Chess career ==
Jones represented Botswana in three Chess Olympiads in 1986, 1988 and 1990. In 1992, 1994 and 1996 he served as non-playing captain, delegate and Head of Delegation. He represented PNG in nine Chess Olympiads from 2004 to 2022. His best result was scoring 10/13, and finishing 6th on the reserve board, at the 36th Chess Olympiad in Calvia 2004. Jones was awarded the FIDE Master title for this result.

Jones competed in the Oceania Zonal Chess Championships on the Gold Coast, Queensland in 2009.

He was awarded the FIDE International Arbiter title in 1990. He was the secretary of the FIDE Development Commission from 2006 to 2018. From 2018 to 2022 he served on the Systems Pairings and Programs Commission.

After returning to the United Kingdom in the late 1990s, he co-founded the White Rose chess team with Angus Dunnington and the team is now into its 25th season (March 2023) and is challenging for their first 4NCL title. From 2003 to 2006 Rupert served as the International Director of the English Chess Federation, and served as President of the Northern Counties Chess Union from 2010 to 2012.

== Notable games ==
- Rupert Jones - Jasvindar Singh, 28th Chess Olympiad Thessaloniki (1988), King's Gambit: Accepted, (C34), 1-0

1.e4 e5 2.f4 exf4 3.Nf3 d6 4.Bc4 Be6 5.Qe2 Nc6 6.0-0 Qd7 7.Bb5 a6 8.Ba4 Bg4 9.c3 b5 10.Bc2 Ne5 11.Nxe5 dxe5 12.Qe1 Nf6 13.d4 exd4 14.Bxf4 dxc3 15.Nxc3 Bb4 16.Be3 0-0 17.Qh4 Bxc3 18.bxc3 Be2 19.Rxf6 gxf6 20.e5 h5 21.Qxf6 Qg4 22.Bg5 Qe6 23.Qf4 Qg4 24.Qd2 Bc4 25.Bf6 Bd5 26.Qxd5 Qc4 1-0
