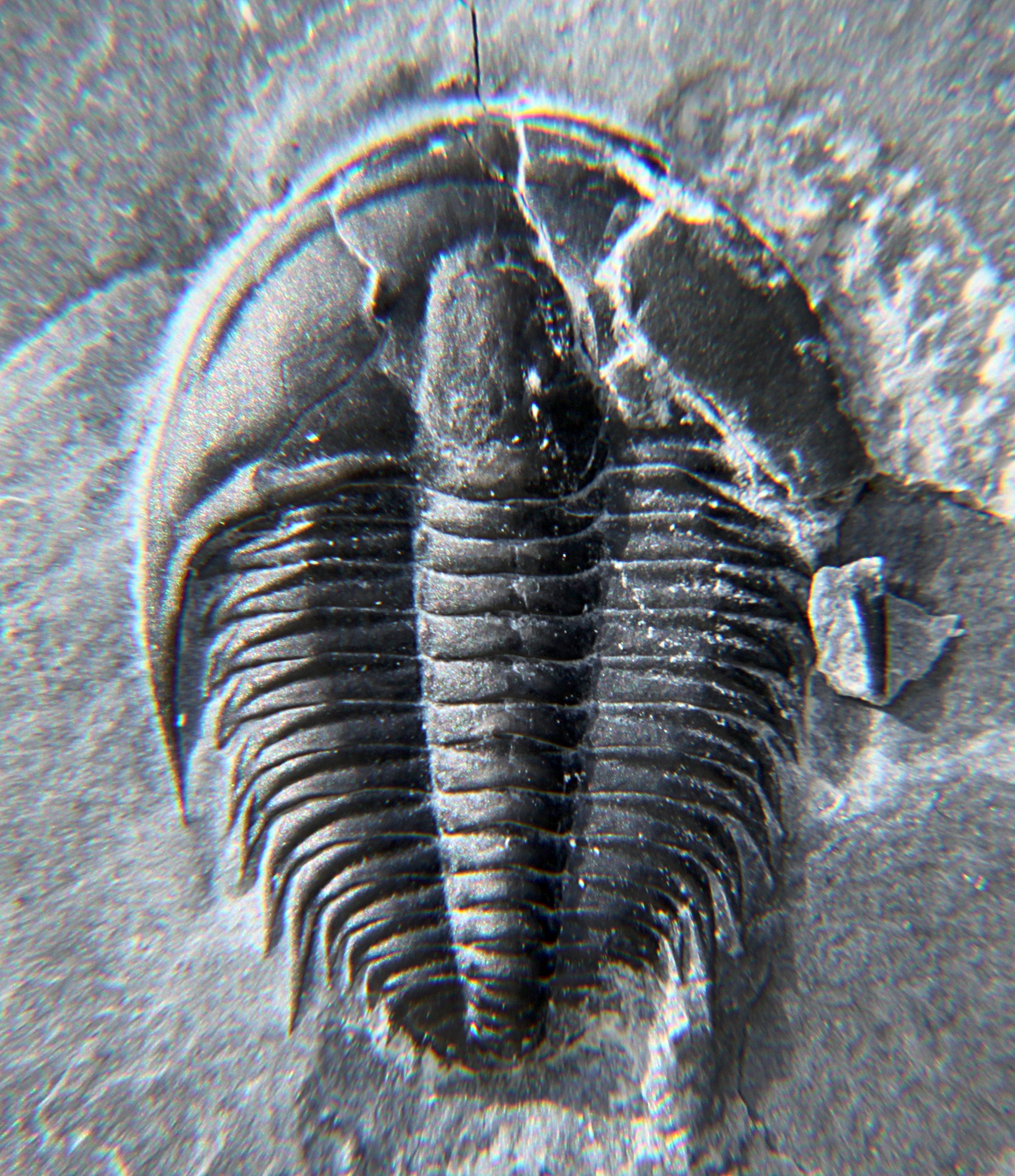
- Orygmaspis contracta, 16 mm

Scientific classification
- Kingdom: Animalia
- Phylum: Arthropoda
- Clade: †Artiopoda
- Class: †Trilobita
- Order: †Asaphida
- Family: †Parabolinoididae
- Genus: †Orygmaspis; Resser, 1937

Species
- O. llanoensis (Walcott, 1890) (type) = Ptychoparia llanoensis; O. calvilimbata Westrop, 1986 = Bernia obtusa, Parabolinoides hebe; O. contracta (Frederickson, 1949) = Parabolinoides contractus; O. firma Frederickson, 1949; O. spinula Westrop, 1986

= Orygmaspis =

Orygmaspis Temporal range: Upper Cambrian

Genus of trilobites

Orygmaspis is a genus of asaphid trilobite with an inverted egg-shaped outline, a wide headshield, small eyes, long genal spines, 12 spined thorax segments and a small, short tailshield, with four pairs of spines. It lived during the Late Cambrian in what are today Canada and the United States.

== Description ==
The outline of the exoskeleton Orygmaspis is inverted egg-shaped, with a parabolic headshield (or cephalon) less than twice as wide as long. The well-defined central raised area (or glabella), excluding the backward occipital ring, is ¾× as wide as long, moderately convex, truncate-tapering, with 3 pairs of shallow to obsolete lateral furrows. The occipital ring is well defined. The distance between the glabella and the border (or preglabellar field) is ±¼× as long as the glabella. Eyes small to almost medium, 12-20% of the length of the cephalon, positioned between the front and the middle of the glabella and about ⅓ as far out as the glabella is wide. The remaining parts of the cephalon, called fixed and free cheeks (or fixigenae and librigenae) are flat. The fracture lines (or sutures) that in moulting separate the librigenae from the fixigenae are divergent just in front of the eyes, becoming parallel near the border furrow and strongly convergent at the margin. From the back of the eyes the sutures are bending out, than in, diverging outward and backward at approximately 45°, cutting the posterior margin well within the inner bend of the spine (or opisthoparian sutures). The articulating middle part of the body (or thorax) has 12 segments. The anteriormost segment gradually narrows into a sideward directed point, while further to the back the spines are directed outward and the spine is of increasing length up until the ninth, while the spine on the tenth segment is abruptly much smaller, and 11 and 12 even more so. The small tailshield (or pygidium) is about ⅓× as wide as the cephalon, narrowly transverse about 2× wider than long. Its axis is slightly wider than the pleural fields to each side, and has up to 4 axial rings and a terminal and almost reaches the margin. Up to 4 pleural segments with obsolete interpleural grooves and shallow pleural furrows. The posterior margin has 3 or 4 pairs of spines, getting smaller further to the back. The surface has fine granules or is smooth.

== Taxonomy ==
Orygmaspis llanoensis and O. firma seem to represent the extremes in morphology of a continuous grade.

== Distribution ==
- Orygmaspis llanoensis was discovered in the Upper Cambrian of the United States (Morgan Creek Member, Wilburns Formation, Central Texas; Taenocephalus-zone, Murray County, Arbuckle Mountains, Oklahoma; Montana; Wyoming).
- Orygmaspis calvilimbata occurs in the Upper Cambrian of the United States (Tomah member, Friendship Mound, Wisconsin).
- Orygmaspis contracta is found in the Upper Cambrian of the United States (Honey Creek Limestone, Central Oklahoma; Tomah member, Lone Rock Formation, White Creek, Wisconsin;) and Canada (McKay Member, Clay Creek, near Cranbrook, British Columbia).
