= Eogeryon =

Eogeryon Temporal range: Cenomanian

Scientific classification
- Domain: Eukaryota
- Kingdom: Animalia
- Phylum: Arthropoda
- Class: Malacostraca
- Order: Decapoda
- Suborder: Pleocyemata
- Infraorder: Brachyura
- Family: †Eogeryonidae
- Genus: †Eogeryon; Ossó, 2021
- Species: †E. elegius

Binomial name
- †Eogeryon elegius Ossó, 2021

Synonyms
- Genus synonymy: †Eogeryon Ossó, 2016; Species synonymy: †Eogeryon elegius Ossó, 2016

Extinct genus of crabs

Eogeryon is an extinct genus of portunoid crab that lived in what is now Spain during the Cenomanian stage. It is known from a single species, Eogeryon elegius.
