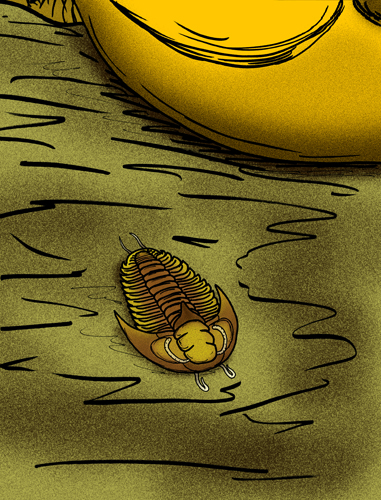
- Lisania spinosa (syn. Aojia spinosa)

Scientific classification
- Kingdom: Animalia
- Phylum: Arthropoda
- Clade: †Artiopoda
- Class: †Trilobita
- Order: †Ptychopariida
- Family: †Lisaniidae
- Genus: †Lisania; Walcott, 1911

Synonyms
- Aojia Kobayashi, 1935

= Lisania =

Lisania Temporal range: Cambrian

Lisania is an extinct genus of trilobites, and is the type genus of the family Lisaniidae. Members of the genus lived during the Cambrian Period, which lasted from approximately 542 to 488 million years ago.
