= Liopelta =

Liopelta Temporal range: Cambrian

Scientific classification
- Kingdom: Animalia
- Phylum: Arthropoda
- Clade: †Artiopoda
- Class: †Trilobita
- Order: †Asaphida
- Family: †Anomocarellidae
- Genus: †Liopelta; Suvorova, 1981

Liopelta is an extinct genus from a well-known class of fossil marine arthropods, the trilobites. It lived during the Cambrian Period, which lasted from approximately 539 to 485 million years ago.
