= Krithidae =

Scientific classification
- Kingdom: Animalia
- Phylum: Arthropoda
- Clade: Pancrustacea
- Class: Ostracoda
- Order: Podocopida
- Family: Krithidae

Family of crustaceans

Krithidae is a family of marine ostracods belonging to the superfamily Cytheroidea (suborder Cytherocopina in the order Podocopida.

== Genera ==
Genera:

- Austrokrithe Hartmann, 1994
- Dentokrithe Khosla & Haskins, 1980
- Eukrithe Shornikov, 1975
- Krithe Brady, Crosskey and Robertson, 1874
- Parakrithe Van den Bold, 1958
- Parakrithella Hanai, 1959
- Pseudoparakrithella Purper, 1979 †
- Pseudopsammocythere Carbonnel, 1966
- Thracella Soenmez, 1963 †
- Turmaekrithe Pietrzeniuk, 1969 †
