= Xestoleberididae =

Scientific classification
- Domain: Eukaryota
- Kingdom: Animalia
- Phylum: Arthropoda
- Class: Ostracoda
- Order: Podocopida
- Family: Xestoleberididae; Sars, 1928

Family of crustaceans

Xestoleberididae is a family of ostracods belonging to the order Podocopida.

Genera:

- Castanoleberis Hu & Tao, 2008
- Foveoleberis Malz, 1980
- Hedlandella Mckenzie, 1989
- Microxestoleberis Mueller, 1894
- Ornatoleberis Keij, 1975
- Paraxestoleberis Warne, Whatley & Blagden, 2006
- Platyleberis Bonaduce & Danielopol, 1988
- Prunicythere Hu & Tao, 2008
- Pulaviella Szczechura, 1965
- Semixestoleberis Hartmann, 1962
- Tanchuanoleberis Hu & Tao, 2008
- Uroleberis Triebel, 1958
- Xestoleberis Sars, 1866
