= Protocytheridae =

Scientific classification
- Domain: Eukaryota
- Kingdom: Animalia
- Phylum: Arthropoda
- Class: Ostracoda
- Order: Podocopida
- Family: Protocytheridae

Family of crustaceans

Protocytheridae is a family of crustaceans belonging to the order Podocopida.

Genera:

- Abyssocythereis Schornikov, 1975
- Arculicythere Grekoff, 1963
- Hechticythere Gruendel, 1978
- Kirtonella Bate, 1963
- Pleurocythere Triebel, 1951
- Procytheridea Peterson, 1954
- Protocythere Triebel, 1938
- Pseudohutsonia Wienholz, 1967
- Saxocythere Kemper, 1971
