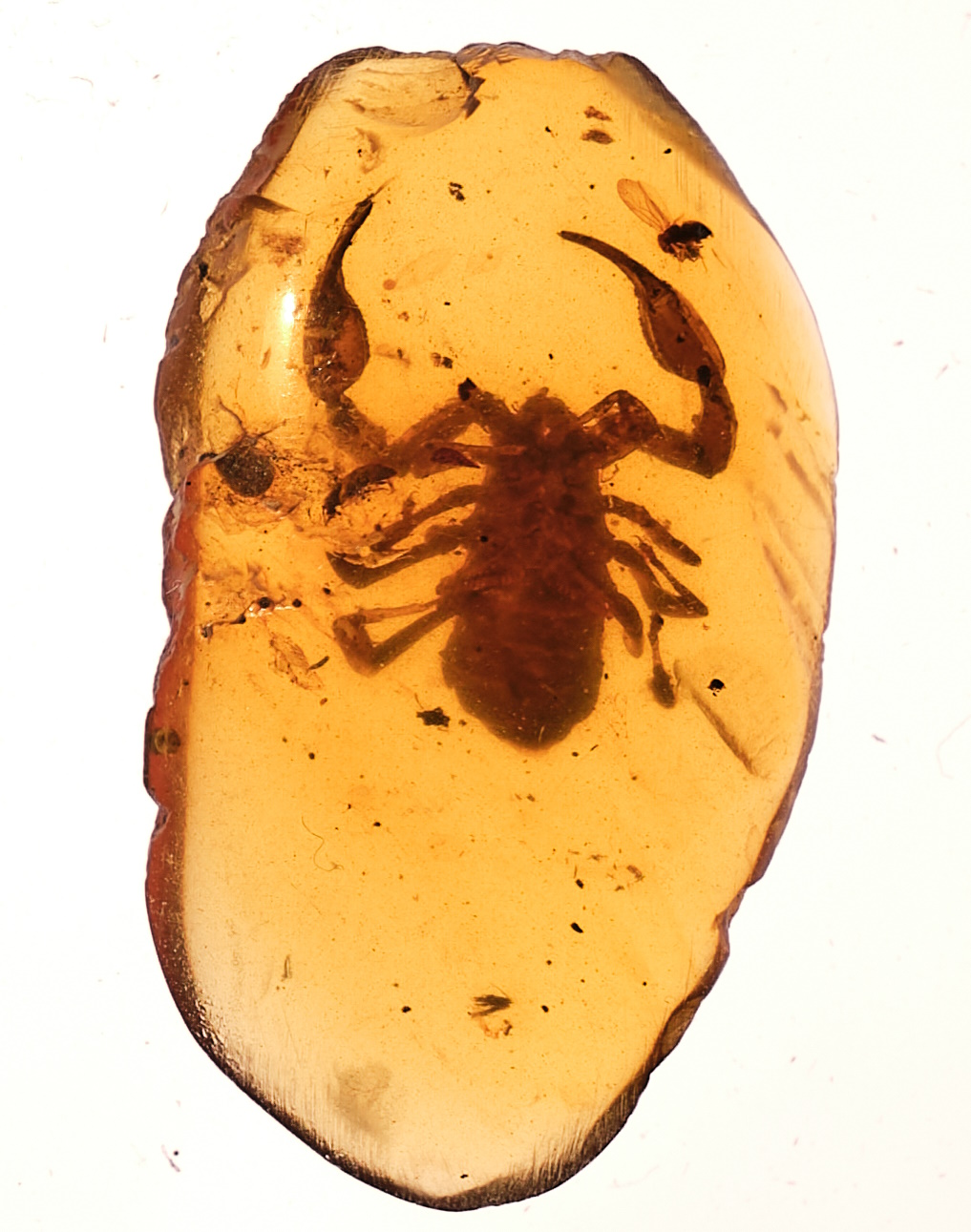
- Type specimen of B. wunpawng

Scientific classification
- Kingdom: Animalia
- Phylum: Arthropoda
- Subphylum: Chelicerata
- Class: Arachnida
- Order: Scorpiones
- Family: †Palaeoeuscorpiidae
- Subfamily: †Archaeoscorpiopinae
- Genus: †Burmesescorpiops; Lourenço, 2016

Type species
- †Burmesescorpiops groheni Lourenço, 2016

Species
- †B. groheni Lourenço, 2016; †B. velteni Lourenço, 2024; †B. wunpawng Lourenço, Dan & Zawgyi, 2025

= Burmesescorpiops =

Burmesescorpiops Temporal range: Cenomanian

Prehistoric extinct scorpion in Burmite amber

Burmesescorpiops is an extinct genus of prehistoric scorpion. It is known from the study of Burmese amber fossils which dates to the earliest part of the Cenomanian stage of the Late Cretaceous, around 99 million years ago.

== Taxonomy ==
The genus Burmesescorpiops belongs to an extinct lineage of scorpions within the family †Palaeoeuscorpiidae and subfamily †Archaeoscorpiopinae.

As of 2025, three species have been described in the genus: B. groehni, B. velteni, and B. wunpawng, the latter being the most recently named. B. wunpawng was described on the basis of a specimen collected by the Kachin Amber Research Institute, a brownish-reddish specimen of Burmese amber containing a mostly-complete scorpion fossil missing its tail. The specimen is believed by the authors to be a male.

Numerous unique characteristics differentiate this prehistoric scorpion from others in its genus. Perhaps most notably, and as cited by media reports, this specimen exhibits an unusual number of pectinal teeth—small, comb-like structures located on the underside of the scorpion. At least one of the authors, Ko Zawgyi, nicknamed it the "Transformer Scorpion" in reference to its similitude to the science fiction Transformers.

== Etymology ==
The species-specific name is derived from "Wunpawng", the term used by the indigenous Kachin people who live in the area of the Hukawng Valley in Northern Myanmar. The word refers to the union and federation of their tribes functioning as a cohesive ethnic group.
