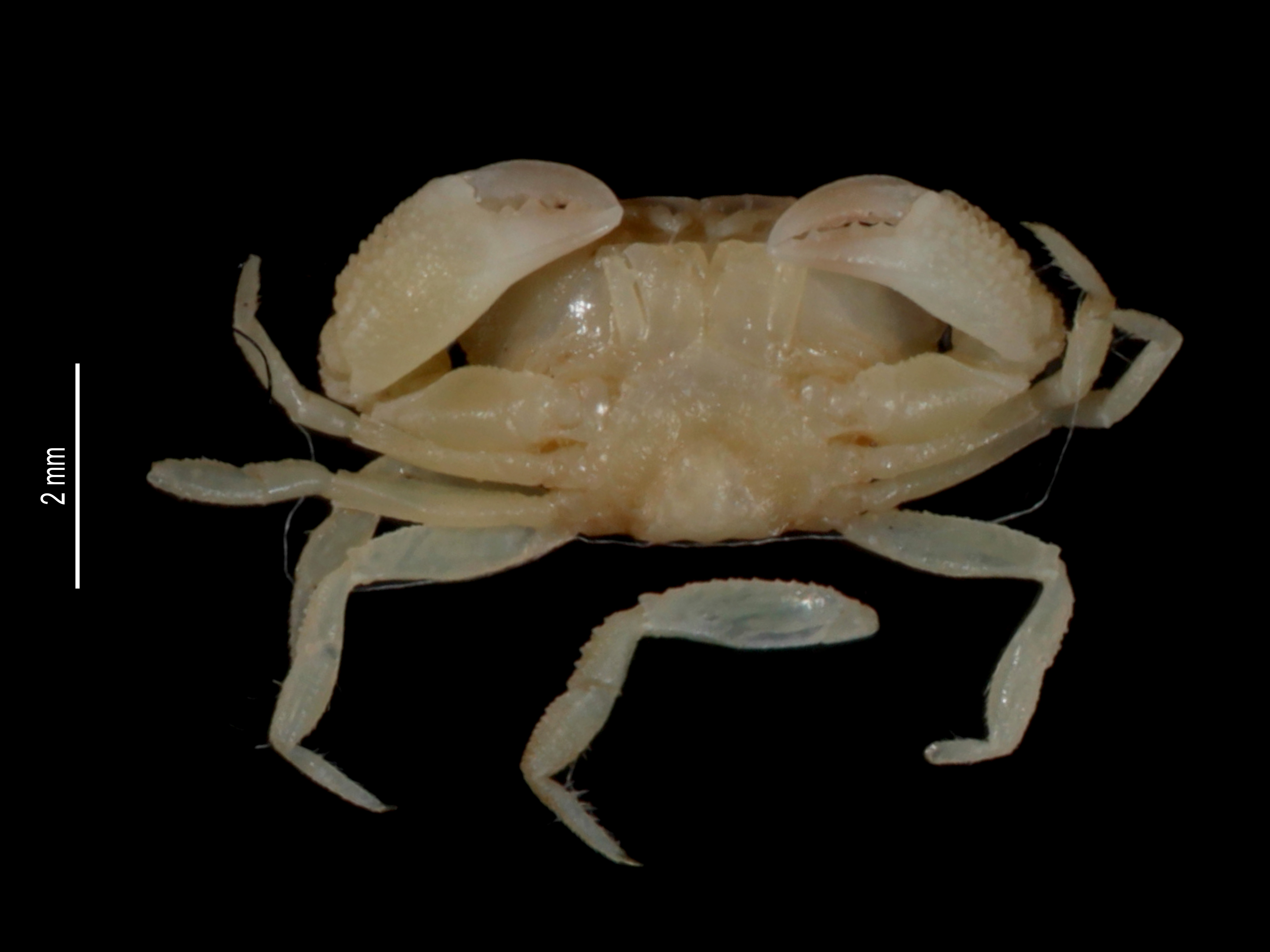
- Nanocassiope oblonga

Scientific classification
- Kingdom: Animalia
- Phylum: Arthropoda
- Clade: Pancrustacea
- Class: Malacostraca
- Order: Decapoda
- Suborder: Pleocyemata
- Infraorder: Brachyura
- Family: Nanocassiopidae
- Genus: Nanocassiope; Guinot, 1967

= Nanocassiope =

Genus of crabs

Nanocassiope is a genus of crabs in the family Xanthidae, containing the following species:

- Nanocassiope alcocki (Rathbun, 1902)
- Nanocassiope grandulipes (Sakai, 1939)
- Nanocassiope melanodactylus (A. Milne Edwards, 1868)
- Nanocassiope oblonga Davie, 1995
- Nanocassiope polita (Rathbun, 1894)
- Nanocassiope tridentata Davie, 1995
