= Thomas Rupert Jones =

British geologist and palaeontologist (1819–1911)

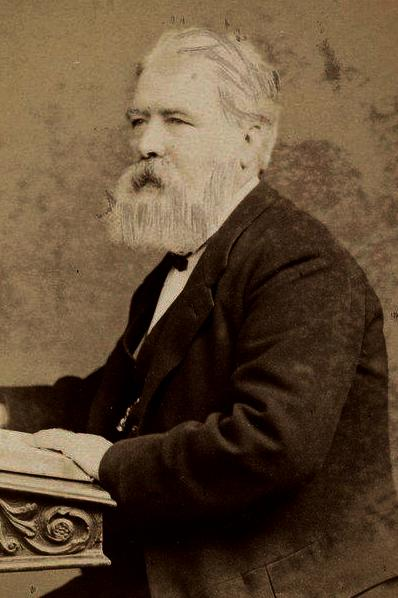
Thomas Rupert Jones.

Thomas Rupert Jones FRS (1 October 1819 – 13 April 1911) was a British geologist and palaeontologist.

== Biography ==
Jones was born on 1 October 1819 in Cheapside, London, the son of John Jones, silk merchant, and his wife Rhoda (née Burberry) Jones of Coventry. While at a private school at Ilminster, his attention was attracted to geology by the fossils that are so abundant in the Lias quarries. In 1835 he was apprenticed to a surgeon at Taunton, and he completed his apprenticeship in 1842 at Newbury in Berkshire.

He was then engaged in practice mainly in London, until in 1849 he was appointed assistant secretary to the Geological Society of London. In 1862 he was made professor of geology at the Royal Military College, Sandhurst. Having devoted his especial attention to microfossils, he now became the highest authority in Britain on the Foraminifera and those Entomostraca that were regarded Ostracoda later on. He edited the 2nd edition of Mantell's Medals of Creation (1854), the 3rd edition of Mantell's Geological Excursions round the Isle of Wight (1854), and the 7th edition of Mantell's Wonders of Geology (1857); he also edited the 2nd edition of F. Dixon's Geology of Sussex (1878). Jones was elected a Fellow of the Royal Society in June 1872 and was awarded the Lyell Medal by the Geological Society in 1890. For many years he was specially interested in the geology of South Africa.

He died and was buried at Chesham Bois, Buckinghamshire. He had married twice: firstly to Mary, daughter of William Harris of Charing, Kent, and secondly to Charlotte Ashburnham, daughter of Archibald Archer.

== Bibliography ==
His publications included:

- A Monograph of the Entomostraca of the Cretaceous Formation of England
- A Monograph of the Tertiary Entomostraca of England
- A Monograph of the Fossil Estheriae
- A Monograph of the Foraminifera of the Crag (with H. B. Brady); and numerous articles in the Annals and Magazine of Natural History, the Geological Magazine, the Proceedings of the Geologists' Association, and other journals.
