= Cytheridae =

Scientific classification
- Kingdom: Animalia
- Phylum: Arthropoda
- Clade: Pancrustacea
- Class: Ostracoda
- Order: Podocopida
- Family: Cytheridae

Family of crustaceans

Cytheridae is a family of ostracods belonging to the order Podocopida.

== Genera ==
Genera:

- Abditacythere Hartmann, 1964
- Asymmetricythere Bassiouni, 1971
- Austrocythere Hartmann, 1989
