= 2017 in arthropod paleontology =

This list of fossil arthropods described in 2017 is a list of new taxa of trilobites, fossil insects, crustaceans, arachnids and other fossil arthropods of every kind described during the year 2017, as well as other significant discoveries and events related to arthropod paleontology occurring in 2017.

== Arachnids ==
=== Research ===
- A study on the anatomy of the Carboniferous whip spider Graeophonus anglicus, as well as on the phylogenetic relationships of fossil whip spiders, is published by Garwood et al. (2017).
- A study on the morphological diversity of fossil species belonging to the family Archaeidae compared with the diversity of extant species is published by Wood (2017).
- A specimen of the tick species Cornupalpatum burmanicum entangled in a pennaceous feather of an early bird or non-avian pennaraptoran theropod is described from the Cretaceous amber from Myanmar by Peñalver et al. (2017).

=== New taxa ===
Name	Novelty	Status	Authors	Age	Unit	Location	Notes	Images
Aculeatosoma	Gen. et sp. nov	Valid	Wunderlich	Late Cretaceous (Cenomanian)	Burmese amber	Myanmar	A member of the family Psilodercidae. The type species is A. pyritmutatio.	
Albiburmops	Gen. et sp. nov	Valid	Wunderlich	Late Cretaceous (Cenomanian)	Burmese amber	Myanmar	A spider belonging to the family Lagonomegopidae. The type species is A. annulipes.	
Alioatrax	Gen. et sp. nov	Valid	Wunderlich	Late Cretaceous (Cenomanian)	Burmese amber	Myanmar	A spider of uncertain affinities, originally described as a member of the family Hexathelidae. The type species is A. incertus.	
Amblyomma birmitum	Sp. nov	Valid	Chitimia-Dobler et al.	Late Cretaceous (Cenomanian)	Burmese amber	Myanmar	A hard tick, a species of Amblyomma.	
Balticonopsis distalis	Sp. nov	Valid	Wunderlich	Eocene	Baltic amber	Europe (Baltic Sea coast)	A member of the family Anapidae.	
Balticonopsis dunlopi	Sp. nov	Valid	Wunderlich	Eocene	Baltic amber	Europe (Baltic Sea coast)	A member of the family Anapidae.	
Balticonopsis ludwigi	Sp. nov	Valid	Wunderlich	Eocene	Bitterfeld amber	Germany	A member of the family Anapidae.	
Balticonopsis metatarsalis	Sp. nov	Valid	Wunderlich	Eocene	Baltic amber	Europe (Baltic Sea coast)	A member of the family Anapidae.	
Betaburmesebuthus joergi	Sp. nov	Valid	Lourenço & Rossi	Cretaceous	Burmese amber	Myanmar	A scorpion belonging to the superfamily Buthoidea and the family Palaeoburmesebuthidae.	
Brignoliblemma	Gen. et 3 sp. nov	Junior synonym	Wunderlich	Late Cretaceous (Cenomanian)	Burmese amber	Myanmar	A member of the family Tetrablemmidae. Genus includes new species B. bizarre, B. nala and B. paranala. Wunderlich & Müller (2020) considered the genus Brignoliblemma to be a junior synonym of the genus Electroblemma, though the authors maintained the three named species as distinct species within the latter genus.	
Burmadictyna postcopula	Sp. nov	Valid	Wunderlich	Late Cretaceous (Cenomanian)	Burmese amber	Myanmar	A deinopoid spider belonging to the family Salticoididae.	
Burmathele	Gen. et sp. nov	Valid	Wunderlich	Late Cretaceous (Cenomanian)	Burmese amber	Myanmar	A member of Mesothelae belonging to the family Burmathelidae. The type species is B. biseriata.	
Burmesarchaea alissa	Sp. nov	Valid	Wunderlich	Late Cretaceous (Cenomanian)	Burmese amber	Myanmar	A member of the family Archaeidae.	
Burmesarchaea caudata	Sp. nov	Valid	Wunderlich	Late Cretaceous (Cenomanian)	Burmese amber	Myanmar	A member of the family Archaeidae.	
Burmesarchaea crassicaput	Sp. nov	Valid	Wunderlich	Late Cretaceous (Cenomanian)	Burmese amber	Myanmar	A member of the family Archaeidae.	
Burmesarchaea crassichelae	Sp. nov	Valid	Wunderlich	Late Cretaceous (Cenomanian)	Burmese amber	Myanmar	A member of the family Archaeidae.	
Burmesarchaea gibber	Sp. nov	Valid	Wunderlich	Late Cretaceous (Cenomanian)	Burmese amber	Myanmar	A member of the family Archaeidae.	
Burmesarchaea gibberoides	Sp. nov	Valid	Wunderlich	Late Cretaceous (Cenomanian)	Burmese amber	Myanmar	A member of the family Archaeidae.	
Burmesarchaea gibbosa	Sp. nov	Valid	Wunderlich	Late Cretaceous (Cenomanian)	Burmese amber	Myanmar	A member of the family Archaeidae.	
Burmesarchaea longicollum	Sp. nov	Valid	Wunderlich	Late Cretaceous (Cenomanian)	Burmese amber	Myanmar	A member of the family Archaeidae.	
Burmesarchaea propinqua	Sp. nov	Valid	Wunderlich	Late Cretaceous (Cenomanian)	Burmese amber	Myanmar	A member of the family Archaeidae.	
Burmesarchaea pseudogibber	Sp. nov	Valid	Wunderlich	Late Cretaceous (Cenomanian)	Burmese amber	Myanmar	A member of the family Archaeidae.	
Burmesarchaea pustulata	Sp. nov	Valid	Wunderlich	Late Cretaceous (Cenomanian)	Burmese amber	Myanmar	A member of the family Archaeidae.	
Burmesarchaea quadrata	Sp. nov	Valid	Wunderlich	Late Cretaceous (Cenomanian)	Burmese amber	Myanmar	A member of the family Archaeidae.	
Burmorchestina acuminata	Sp. nov	Valid	Wunderlich	Late Cretaceous (Cenomanian)	Burmese amber	Myanmar	A member of the family Oonopidae.	
Burmorchestina biangulata	Sp. nov	Valid	Wunderlich	Late Cretaceous (Cenomanian)	Burmese amber	Myanmar	A member of the family Oonopidae.	
Burmorchestina plana	Sp. nov	Valid	Wunderlich	Late Cretaceous (Cenomanian)	Burmese amber	Myanmar	A member of the family Oonopidae.	
Burmorchestina pulcheroides	Sp. nov	Valid	Wunderlich	Late Cretaceous (Cenomanian)	Burmese amber	Myanmar	A member of the family Oonopidae.	
Burmorchestina tuberosa	Sp. nov	Valid	Wunderlich	Late Cretaceous (Cenomanian)	Burmese amber	Myanmar	A member of the family Oonopidae.	
Centruroides knodeli	Sp. nov	Valid	Lourenço		Mexican amber	Mexico	A scorpion belonging to the family Buthidae, a species of Centruroides.	
Cethegoides	Gen. et sp. nov	Valid	Wunderlich	Late Cretaceous (Cenomanian)	Burmese amber	Myanmar	A member of the family Dipluridae. The type species is C. patricki.	
Cymbioblemma	Gen. et sp. nov	Valid	Wunderlich	Late Cretaceous (Cenomanian)	Burmese amber	Myanmar	A member of the family Tetrablemmidae. The type species is C. corniger.	
Cymbioropsis	Gen. et sp. nov	Valid	Wunderlich	Eocene	Baltic amber	Europe (Baltic Sea coast)	A member of the family Zoropsidae. The type species is C. palpussutura.	
Deinocroton	Gen. et sp. nov	Valid	Peñalver, Arillo, Anderson & Pérez-de la Fuente in Peñalver et al.	Late Cretaceous (Cenomanian)	Burmese amber	Myanmar	A tick. The type species is D. draculi.	
Deinopedes	Gen. et sp. nov	Valid	Wunderlich	Late Cretaceous (Cenomanian)	Burmese amber	Myanmar	A spider. Originally assigned to the family Deinopidae, but subsequently transferred to the deinopoid family Eodeinopidae. Genus includes new species D. tranquillus.	
Eodeinopis	Gen. et sp. nov	Valid	Wunderlich	Late Cretaceous (Cenomanian)	Burmese amber	Myanmar	A deinopoid spider. Originally assigned to the family Burmadictynidae, but subsequently transferred to the family Eodeinopidae. The type species is E. longipes.	
Eoeuscorpius	Gen. et sp. nov	Valid	Kühl & Lourenço	Eocene	Monte Bolca	Italy	A scorpion, possibly a member of the family Euscorpiidae. Genus includes new species E. ceratoi.	
Eogamasomorpha hamata	Sp. nov	Valid	Wunderlich	Late Cretaceous (Cenomanian)	Burmese amber	Myanmar	A member of the family Tetrablemmidae.	
?Eogamasomorpha unicornis	Sp. nov	Valid	Wunderlich	Late Cretaceous (Cenomanian)	Burmese amber	Myanmar	A member of the family Tetrablemmidae. Originally described as a possible species of Eogamasomorpha; Wunderlich & Müller (2020) transferred it to the genus Unicornutiblemma.	
Eomysmauchenius dubius	Sp. nov	Valid	Wunderlich	Late Cretaceous (Cenomanian)	Burmese amber	Myanmar	A planarchaeid palpimanoid spider.	
Eoprychia clara	Sp. nov	Valid	Wunderlich	Eocene	Baltic amber	Europe (Baltic Sea coast)	A member of the family Zoropsidae.	
Furcembolus crassitibia	Sp. nov	Valid	Wunderlich	Late Cretaceous (Cenomanian)	Burmese amber	Myanmar	A member of the family Tetrablemmidae.	
Furcembolus grossa	Sp. nov	Valid	Wunderlich	Late Cretaceous (Cenomanian)	Burmese amber	Myanmar	A member of the family Tetrablemmidae.	
Furcembolus longior	Sp. nov	Valid	Wunderlich	Late Cretaceous (Cenomanian)	Burmese amber	Myanmar	A member of the family Tetrablemmidae.	
Furculoborus	Gen. et sp. nov	Junior synonym	Wunderlich	Late Cretaceous (Cenomanian)	Burmese amber	Myanmar	A member of the family Uloboridae. The type species is F. patellaris. Wunderlich & Müller (2021) subsequently considered Furculoborus to be a junior synonym of the genus Paramiagrammopes, and transferred F. patellaris to the latter genus.	
?Gorgopsina scharffi	Sp. nov	Valid	Wunderlich	Neogene		Ethiopia	A jumping spider.	
Hirsutisoma	Fam. Gen. et 3 sp. nov	Valid	Wunderlich	Late Cretaceous (Cenomanian)	Burmese amber	Myanmar	A Ricinulei in the family Hirsutisomidae. Genus includes new species H. acutiformis, H. bruckschi and H. dentata.	
Kachin	Gen. et 2 sp. nov	Valid	Wunderlich	Late Cretaceous (Cenomanian)	Burmese amber	Myanmar	A member of the family Uloboridae. Genus includes new species K. fruticosus and K. fruticosoides.	
Lineaburmops maculatus	Sp. nov	Valid	Wunderlich	Late Cretaceous (Cenomanian)	Burmese amber	Myanmar	A spider belonging to the family Lagonomegopidae.	
Longissipalpus cochlea	Sp. nov	Valid	Wunderlich	Late Cretaceous (Cenomanian)	Burmese amber	Myanmar	A relative of Mongolarachne.	
Longissithorax	Gen. et sp. nov	Valid	Wunderlich	Late Cretaceous (Cenomanian)	Burmese amber	Myanmar	A member of the family Tetrablemmidae. The type species is L. myanmarensis.	
Longithorax	Gen. et sp. nov	Junior homonym	Wunderlich	Late Cretaceous (Cenomanian)	Burmese amber	Myanmar	A member of the family Tetrablemmidae. The type species is L. furca. The generic name is preoccupied by Longithorax Illig (1906); Wunderlich (2025) coined a replacement name Longthorax.	
Loxoderces	Gen. 3 sp. nov	Junior synonym	Wunderlich	Late Cretaceous (Cenomanian)	Burmese amber	Myanmar	Originally described as a spider belonging to the family Eopsilodercidae. Genus includes new species L. curvatus, L. longicymbium and L. rectus. Wunderlich & Müller (2020) considered the genus Loxoderces to be a junior synonym of the genus Burmorsolus, though the authors maintained the three named species as distinct species within the latter genus.	
Maevia eureka	Sp. nov	Valid	Riquelme & Menéndez-Acuña	Miocene	Mexican amber	Mexico	A jumping spider. Originally described as a species of Maevia, but subsequently transferred to the genus Paramaevia.	
Megeremaeus cretaceous	Sp. nov	Valid	Sidorchuk & Behan-Pelletier	Late Cretaceous (Campanian)	Canadian amber	Canada	A mite belonging to the group Oribatida and the family Megeremaeidae.	
Mesothelyphonus	Gen. et sp. nov	Valid	Cai & Huang	Late Cretaceous (Cenomanian)	Burmese amber	Myanmar	A whip scorpion belonging to the family Thelyphonidae and the subfamily Thelyphoninae. The type species is M. parvus.	
Monooculricinuleus	Gen. et 2 sp. nov	Valid	Wunderlich	Late Cretaceous (Cenomanian)	Burmese amber	Myanmar	A member of Ricinulei or Opiliones. Genus includes new species M. incisus and M. semiglobosus.	
Palaeoburmesebuthus longipalpis	Sp. nov	Valid	Lourenço & Rossi	Cretaceous	Burmese amber	Myanmar	A scorpion belonging to the superfamily Buthoidea and the family Palaeoburmesebuthidae.	
Palaeoleptoneta crus	Sp. nov	Valid	Wunderlich	Late Cretaceous (Cenomanian)	Burmese amber	Myanmar	A member of the family Leptonetidae.	
Palpalpaculla	Gen. et sp. nov	Valid	Wunderlich	Late Cretaceous (Cenomanian)	Burmese amber	Myanmar	A member of the family Tetrablemmidae. The type species is P. pulcher.	
Parvithele	Gen. et 2 sp. nov	Valid	Wunderlich	Late Cretaceous (Cenomanian)	Burmese amber	Myanmar	A member of Mesothelae belonging to the family Parvithelidae. Genus includes new species P. muelleri and P. spinipes.	
?Paxillomegops cornutus	Sp. nov	Valid	Wunderlich	Late Cretaceous (Cenomanian)	Burmese amber	Myanmar	A spider belonging to the family Lagonomegopidae.	
Pekkachilus	Gen. et sp. nov	Valid	Wunderlich	Late Cretaceous (Cenomanian)	Burmese amber	Myanmar	A spider belonging to the group Araneomorphae and the family Vetiatoridae. The type species is P. vesica.	
Permomatveevia	Gen. et sp. nov	Valid	Dammann	Permian (Kungurian)		Russia	A scorpion. The type species is P. perneri.	
Pholcochyrocer altipecten	Sp. nov	Valid	Wunderlich	Late Cretaceous (Cenomanian)	Burmese amber	Myanmar	A spider belonging to the family Pholcochyroceridae.	
Planarchaea oblonga	Sp. nov	Valid	Wunderlich	Eocene	Baltic amber	Europe (Baltic Sea region)	A planarchaeid palpimanoid spider. Originally described as originating from the Cretaceous amber from Myanmar, but subsequently reinterpreted as originating from the Eocene Baltic amber and transferred to the separate genus Baltplanarchaea by Wunderlich (2025).	
Planarchaea ovata	Sp. nov	Valid	Wunderlich	Late Cretaceous (Cenomanian)	Burmese amber	Myanmar	A planarchaeid palpimanoid spider. Originally described as a species of Planarchaea, but subsequently transferred to the genus Eomysmauchenius.	
Planimegops	Gen. et sp. nov	Valid	Wunderlich	Late Cretaceous (Cenomanian)	Burmese amber	Myanmar	A spider belonging to the family Lagonomegopidae. The type species is P. parvus.	
Praearaneus	Gen. et sp. nov	Valid	Wunderlich	Late Cretaceous (Cenomanian)	Burmese amber	Myanmar	A spider belonging to the family Praearaneidae. The type species is P. bruckschi.	
Praepholcus	Gen. sp. nov	Valid	Wunderlich	Late Cretaceous (Cenomanian)	Burmese amber	Myanmar	A spider belonging to the family Eopsilodercidae. The type species is P. huberi.	
Priscaleclercera	Gen. et comb. et 2 sp. nov	Valid	Wunderlich	Late Cretaceous (Cenomanian)	Burmese amber	Myanmar	A member of the family Psilodercidae. Genus includes "Leclercera" longissipes Wunderlich (2012), "Leclercera" spicula Wunderlich (2012), "Leclercera" ellenbergeri Wunderlich (2015) and "Leclercera" sexaculeata Wunderlich (2015), as well as new species P. brevispinae and P. paucispinae.	
Propterkachin	Gen. et sp. nov	Valid	Wunderlich	Late Cretaceous (Cenomanian)	Burmese amber	Myanmar	A member of the family Uloboridae. The type species is P. magnoculus.	
Pseudoeoprychia	Gen. et sp. nov	Valid	Wunderlich	Eocene	Baltic amber	Europe (Baltic Sea coast)	A member of the family Zoropsidae. The type species is P. triplex.	
Pseudorsolus	Gen. et comb. nov	Valid	Wunderlich	Late Cretaceous (Cenomanian)	Burmese amber	Myanmar	A member of Dysderoidea belonging to the family Plumorsolidae; a new genus for "Burmorsolus" crassus Wunderlich (2015). Wunderlich & Müller (2020) considered the genus Pseudorsolus to be a junior synonym of the genus Burmorsolus, and transferred its sole species back to the genus Burmorsolus.	
Pulvillothele	Gen. et sp. nov	Valid	Wunderlich	Late Cretaceous (Cenomanian)	Burmese amber	Myanmar	A member of Mesothelae belonging to the family Parvithelidae. The type species is P. haupti.	
Spatiator bitterfeldensis	Sp. nov	Valid	Wunderlich	Eocene	Bitterfeld amber	Germany	A member of Araneomorphae belonging to the family Spatiatoridae.	
Spinoburmesebuthus	Gen. et sp. nov	Disputed	Lourenço & Velten	Cretaceous	Burmese amber	Myanmar	A scorpion belonging to the superfamily Buthoidea and the family Palaeoburmesebuthidae. Genus includes new species S. pohli. Xuan, Cai & Huang (2023) considered Spinoburmesebuthus to be a junior synonym of the genus Betaburmesebuthus.	

== Crustaceans ==
=== Research ===
- A study on the identification of sexual morphs and the reproductive system of the Early Cretaceous clam shrimp Eosestheria middendorfii is published by Hethke et al. (2017).
- A study on the Cretaceous clam shrimp Xibeiestheria pora, identifying new taxonomic features, is published by Li (2017).
- Fossil specimen which might be a barnacle nauplius is described from the Upper Jurassic Solnhofen Limestone (Germany) by Nagler et al. (2017).
- Three specimens of zoea-type malacostracan larvae, showing similarities to the larvae of the lobster Nephrops norvegicus, are described from the Late Jurassic Solnhofen limestone (Germany) by Haug & Haug (2017).
- A study on the anatomy of two specimens of Urda rostrata from the Middle Jurassic (Bathonian) of Germany is published by Nagler, Hyžný & Haug (2017), who interpret this species as the oldest fossil parasitic isopod known to date.
- Isolated, small fossils from North America, Europe, Africa and Asia, the oldest of which were recovered from the Oligocene (Chattian) Chickasawhay Limestone (Alabama, United States), are interpreted as remains of alpheid shrimps by Hyžný et al. (2017).
- A redescription of the shrimps Aeger brevirostris and Archeosolenocera straeleni from the Middle Jurassic La Voulte-sur-Rhône Lagerstätte (France) is published by Jauvion, Charbonnier & Bernard (2017), who consider the species Antrimpos secretaniae to be a junior synonym of Archeosolenocera straeleni.
- New fossils of members of the crab genus Cenomanocarcinus, as well as the southernmost record of the species Necrocarcinus woodwardii, are reported from the Cretaceous of Spain by Ossó (2017).
- Claw fragments of the trichodactylid crabs are described from the Eocene and Oligocene Pozo Formation, Oligocene Chambira Formation (Peru) and Miocene Solimões Formation (Brazil) by Klaus et al. (2017), representing the oldest records of the family reported so far.
- A revision of the genus Eryma is published by Devillez & Charbonnier (2017), who consider the genera Protoclytiopsis Birshtein (1958) and Galicia Garassino & Krobicki (2002) to be junior synonyms of the genus Eryma.

=== New taxa ===
==== Malacostracans ====
Name	Novelty	Status	Authors	Age	Unit	Location	Notes	Images
Alcespina	Gen. et sp. et comb. nov	Valid	Pasini & Garassino	Early Eocene – early Oligocene	Bateque Formation	Italy; Mexico; France?	A crab belonging to the family Raninidae and the subfamily Ranininae. The type species is A. ovadaensis; genus also includes "Ranina" berglundi Squires & Demetrion (1992).	
Annuntidiogenes massetispinosus	Sp. nov		Fraaije, Van Bakel & Jagt	Late Cretaceous (Maastrichtian)	Maastricht Formation	Netherlands	A hermit crab.	
Aquitanoscia	Gen. et 2 sp. nov	Valid	Broly et al.	Miocene	Mexican amber	Mexico	A woodlouse. Genus includes new species A. chiapasensis and A. maternus.	
Arabicarcinus	Gen. et sp. nov	Valid	Schweitzer & Feldmann	Late Cretaceous	Aruma Formation	Saudi Arabia	A crab belonging to the superfamily Carpilioidea. The type species is A. arumensis.	
Armacrangon	Gen. et sp. nov	Valid	Charbonnier et al.	Late Cretaceous		Lebanon	A member of the family Glyphocrangonidae. Genus includes new species A. edwardsi.	
Asthenognathus alleronensis	Sp. nov	Valid	Pasini, Garassino & De Angeli	Early Pleistocene		Italy	A member of Varunidae.	
Aviamysis	Gen. et sp. nov	Valid	San Vicente & Cartanyà	Middle Triassic (Ladinian)		Spain	A member of the family Mysidae. The type species is A. pinetellensis.	
Axius hofstedtae	Sp. nov		Hyžný, Jakobsen & Fraaije	Late Oligocene		Denmark	A species of Axius.	
?Bentheogennema phoenicia	Sp. nov	Valid	Charbonnier et al.	Late Cretaceous		Lebanon		
Bournelyreidus ericksoni	Sp. nov	Valid	Kornecki, Feldmann & Schweitzer	Late Cretaceous (Maastrichtian)	Coon Creek Formation	United States	A lyreidid raninoid crab.	
Calappa damarcoi	Sp. nov	Valid	Pasini & Garassino	Early Oligocene		Italy	A species of Calappa.	
Calliaxina hadjoulaensis	Sp. nov	Valid	Charbonnier et al.	Late Cretaceous (Cenomanian)		Lebanon	A member of the family Callianassidae.	
Calocarides arzignanensis	Sp. nov	Valid	De Angeli & Caporiondo	Eocene		Italy	A member of Axiidea.	
Carinacaris antennae	Sp. nov	Valid	Charbonnier et al.	Late Cretaceous		Lebanon		
Carinatus	Gen. et sp. nov	Valid	Nyborg et al.	Late Cretaceous (Maastrichtian)	Owl Creek Formation; Prairie Bluff Formation	United States	A raninoid crab, probably a member of the family Raninidae and the subfamily Symethinae. Genus includes new species C. galebishopi.	
Cascolus	Gen. et sp. nov	Valid	Siveter et al.	Silurian (Wenlock)	Herefordshire Konservat-Lagerstätte	United Kingdom	A member of Leptostraca. The type species is C. ravitis.	
Cenomanocarcinus enodis	Sp. nov	Valid	Schweitzer et al.	Late Cretaceous (Turonian)	Tres Hermanos Formation	United States		
Cirolana forticrura	Sp. nov	Valid	Baldanza et al.	Early Pleistocene		Italy	An isopod, a species of Cirolana.	
Claudioranina latacantha	Sp. nov	Valid	Martínez-Díaz et al.	Paleocene (Selandian)	Rancho Nuevo Formation	Mexico	A raninid crab.	
Cretalamoha	Gen. et sp. nov	Valid	Nyborg & Garassino	Late Cretaceous (Campanian)	Pender Formation	Canada	A member of Homolidae. The type species is C. boweni. Announced in 2017; validated in 2023.	
Cretaxiopsis	Gen. et sp. nov	Valid	Charbonnier et al.	Late Cretaceous (Cenomanian)		Lebanon	A member of the family Axiidae. Genus includes new species C. libanotica.	
Daenerytanais	Gen. et sp. nov	Valid	Sánchez-García et al.	Late Cretaceous (Cenomanian)		France	A member of Tanaidacea belonging to the family Alavatanaidae. The type species is D. maieuticus.	
Delyrius	Gen. et sp. nov	Valid	Schweitzer et al.	Late Cretaceous (Turonian)	Tres Hermanos Formation	United States	A crab belonging to the family Lyreididae. Genus includes new species D. carthagensis.	
Diogenicheles horstkuscheli	Sp. nov	Valid	Fraaije, Schweigert & van Bakel	Late Jurassic (Kimmeridgian)		Germany	A hermit crab.	
Distolambrus rasnus	Sp. nov	Valid	Baldanza et al.	Early Pleistocene		Italy	A crab belonging to the family Parthenopidae.	
Dromilites belli	Sp. nov	Valid	Van Bakel et al.	Eocene (Ypresian)	London Clay	United Kingdom	A crab belonging to the family Dromiidae.	
Dusa reschi	Sp. nov	Valid	Winkler	Late Jurassic (Tithonian)	Solnhofen limestone	Germany	A member of Penaeidae.	
Echinocaris bisulcata	Sp. nov	Valid	Broda, Collette & Budil	Late Devonian		Poland	A member of Phyllocarida.	
Eoacantholobulus	Gen. et sp. nov	Junior synonym	Ossó & Domínguez	Eocene (Priabonian)		Spain	A crab belonging to the family Panopeidae. Genus includes new species E. oscensis. Ossó et al. (2020) subsequently transferred E. oscensis to the genus Sculptoplax.	
Eohepatella	Gen. et sp. nov	Valid	Beschin & De Angeli	Eocene (Lutetian)		Italy	A crab belonging to the family Aethridae. The type species is E. plana.	
Eomaldivia lessinea	Sp. nov	Valid	De Angeli & Ceccon	Eocene (Ypresian)		Italy	A crab belonging to the family Trapeziidae.	
Eonomus	Gen. et sp. nov	Valid	Nyborg, Garassino & Slak	Eocene	Llajas Formation	United States	A crab belonging to the family Cymonomidae. Genus includes new species E. californianus.	
Eopaguropsis blausteinensis	Sp. nov	Valid	Fraaije, Schweigert & van Bakel	Late Jurassic (Kimmeridgian)		Germany	A hermit crab.	
Epipenaeus	Gen. et sp. nov	Valid	Charbonnier et al.	Late Cretaceous		Lebanon	A member of the family Carpopenaeidae. Genus includes new species E. abisaadorum.	
Eryma oscari	Sp. nov	Valid	Charbonnier et al.	Late Cretaceous		Lebanon		
Eurynome italica	Sp. nov	Valid	Baldanza et al.	Early Pleistocene		Italy	A spider crab.	
Galathea caporiondoi	Sp. nov	Valid	De Angeli & Ceccon	Eocene (Ypresian)		Italy	A species of Galathea.	
Gladicrangon	Gen. et sp. nov	Valid	Charbonnier et al.	Late Cretaceous		Lebanon	A member of the family Glyphocrangonidae. Genus includes new species G. coriacea.	
Ibacus? mazariorum	Sp. nov	Valid	Audo	Eocene (Ypresian)	Ghazij Formation	Pakistan	A slipper lobster belonging to the subfamily Ibacinae, possibly a species of Ibacus.	
Joinvilleicaris	Gen. et sp. nov	Valid	Charbonnier et al.	Late Cretaceous		Lebanon	A member of the family Penaeidae. Genus includes new species J. longirostris.	
Juglocarcinus	Gen. et sp. nov	Valid	Garvie, Collins & Mellish	Early Cretaceous (Albian)	Upper Walnut Clay Formation	United States	A crab belonging to the group Raninoida and the superfamily Palaeocorystoidea. The type species is J. tumulus.	
Lessinipagurus ornatus	Sp. nov	Valid	De Angeli & Caporiondo	Eocene (Lutetian)		Italy	A hermit crab belonging to the family Xylopaguridae.	
Lessinipagurus planus	Sp. nov	Valid	De Angeli & Caporiondo	Eocene (Lutetian)		Italy	A hermit crab belonging to the family Xylopaguridae.	
Leucosiraja	Gen. et sp. nov	Valid	Baldanza et al.	Early Pleistocene		Italy	A crab belonging to the family Leucosiidae. Genus includes new species L. manta.	
Libanoaxius	Gen. et sp. nov	Valid	Charbonnier et al.	Late Cretaceous		Lebanon	A member of the family Axiidae. Genus includes new species L. beatae.	
Libanocaris curvirostra	Sp. nov	Valid	Charbonnier et al.	Late Cretaceous		Lebanon		
Linuparus keyesi	Sp. nov	Valid	Kornecki, Feldmann & Schweitzer	Late Cretaceous (Maastrichtian)	Coon Creek Formation	United States	A spiny lobster, a species of Linuparus.	
Linuparus secretanae	Sp. nov	Valid	Charbonnier et al.	Late Cretaceous (Cenomanian)		Lebanon	A species of Linuparus.	
Llajassus	Gen. et comb. nov	Valid	Nyborg & Garassino	Eocene	Llajas Formation; Lookingglass Formation	United States	A slipper lobster; a new genus for "Parribacus" caesius Squires (2001).	
Longipaguristes	Gen. et sp. et comb. nov	Valid	De Angeli & Caporiondo	Eocene		Italy	A hermit crab belonging to the family Diogenidae. The type species is L. manuelae; genus also includes "Paguristes" extentus Beschin et al. (2007).	
Longodromites akainokkos	Sp. nov	Valid	Schweitzer et al.	Late Jurassic		Romania	A crab belonging to the family Longodromitidae.	
Macropenaeus sidiaichensis	Sp. nov	Valid	Boukhalfa et al.	Early Cretaceous (Barremian)	Sidi Aïch Formation	Tunisia		
Magila cretacica	Sp. nov	Valid	Charbonnier et al.	Late Cretaceous		Lebanon	A member of the family Axiidae.	
Mecochirus bartholomaii	Sp. nov	Valid	Jell, Woods & Cook	Early Cretaceous (late Aptian)		Australia	Charbonnier et al. (2021) transferred this species to the genus Meyeria.	
Mecochirus lanceolatus	Sp. nov	Valid	Jell, Woods & Cook	Early Cretaceous (late Aptian)		Australia		
Mecochirus mcclymontorum	Sp. nov	Valid	Jell, Woods & Cook	Early Cretaceous (late Aptian)		Australia		
Merocryptus viperinus	Sp. nov	Valid	Baldanza et al.	Early Pleistocene		Italy	A crab belonging to the family Leucosiidae.	
Mizunotengus	Gen. et sp. nov	Valid	Karasawa & Ando in Karasawa et al.	Early Miocene	Yamami Formation	Japan	A member of Galatheoidea belonging to the family Munidopsidae. The type species is M. makiguchimai.	
Montecaris marynowskii	Sp. nov	Valid	Broda, Collette & Budil	Late Devonian		Poland	A member of Phyllocarida.	
Montemagrelisthes	Gen. et sp. nov	Valid	De Angeli & Ceccon	Eocene (Ypresian)		Italy	A porcelain crab. The type species is M. prealpinus.	
Notahomarus	Gen. et comb. nov	Valid	Charbonnier et al.	Late Cretaceous		Lebanon	A lobster. Genus includes "Pseudastacus" hakelensis Fraas (1878).	
Odontochelion bicarinatum	Sp. nov	Valid	Charbonnier et al.	Late Cretaceous		Lebanon	A member of the family Crangonidae.	
Ommatocarcinus occidentalis	Sp. nov	Valid	Baldanza et al.	Early Pleistocene		Italy	A crab belonging to the family Goneplacidae.	
Orbispagurus	Gen. et sp. nov	Valid	De Angeli & Caporiondo	Eocene (Lutetian)		Italy	A hermit crab belonging to the family Xylopaguridae. The type species is O. tessellatus.	
Palaega johannschoberti	Sp. nov	Valid	Keupp & Mahlow	Early Jurassic (Pliensbachian)		Germany	An isopod belonging to the family Cirolanidae.	
Palaeobenthonectes	Gen. et comb. nov	Valid	Charbonnier et al.	Late Cretaceous		Lebanon	A member of the family Benthesicymidae. Genus includes "Penaeus" arambourgi Roger (1946).	
Palaeopandalus	Gen. et sp. nov	Valid	Charbonnier et al.	Late Cretaceous		Lebanon	A member of the family Pandalidae. Genus includes new species P. komaii.	
Paguristes cecconi	Sp. nov	Valid	De Angeli & Caporiondo	Eocene (Lutetian)		Italy	A hermit crab belonging to the family Diogenidae, a species of Paguristes.	
Paguristes clampensis	Sp. nov	Valid	De Angeli & Caporiondo	Eocene (Lutetian)		Italy	A hermit crab belonging to the family Diogenidae, a species of Paguristes.	
Pagurus mainensis	Sp. nov	Valid	De Angeli & Caporiondo	Eocene (Lutetian)		Italy	A hermit crab belonging to the family Paguridae, a species of Pagurus.	
Palaeognathophausia	Gen. et sp. nov	Valid	Charbonnier et al.	Late Cretaceous		Lebanon	A member of the family Gnathophausiidae. Genus includes new species P. libanotica.	
Palaeopalinurus czarnieckii	Sp. nov		Krobicki & Fraaije	Late Jurassic (Tithonian)		Poland	A spiny lobster.	
Palinurus teruzzii	Sp. nov	Valid	Charbonnier et al.	Late Cretaceous (Cenomanian)		Lebanon	A species of Palinurus.	
Paralithodes bishuensis	Sp. nov	Valid	Karasawa & Ando in Karasawa et al.	Early Miocene	Yamami Formation	Japan	A king crab, a species of Paralithodes.	
Paromola roseburgensis	Sp. nov	Valid	Nyborg & Garassino	Early Eocene	Roseburg Formation	United States	A member of Homolidae. Announced in 2017; validated in 2023.	
Phalangiopsis	Gen. et 2 sp. nov	Valid	Charbonnier et al.	Late Cretaceous		Lebanon	A member of the family Chirostylidae. Genus includes new species P. antoinei and P. rogeri.	
Planoprosopon conspicuus	Sp. nov	Valid	Schweitzer et al.	Late Jurassic		Romania	A crab belonging to the family Longodromitidae.	
Porcellana thomasi	Sp. nov	Valid	De Angeli & Ceccon	Eocene (Ypresian)		Italy	A porcelain crab, a species of Porcellana.	
Proticalia	Nom. nov	Valid	De Angeli & Ceccon	Eocene (Ypresian)		Italy	A crab belonging to the family Domeciidae; a replacement name for Tropicalia Beschin et al. (2016).	
Protonecrocarcinus tuberosus	Sp. nov	Valid	Schweitzer et al.	Late Cretaceous (Turonian)	Tres Hermanos Formation	United States		
Proxilianira	Gen. et sp. et comb. nov	Valid	De Angeli & Ceccon	Eocene (Priabonian)		Italy	A crab belonging to the family Raninidae and the subfamily Notopodinae. The type species is P. albertii.	
Psammionassa	Gen. et sp. nov	Valid	Schweitzer et al.	Late Cretaceous (Turonian)	Tres Hermanos Formation	United States	A member of the family Callianassidae. Genus includes new species P. paromola.	
Pseudodrobna	Gen. et sp. nov	Valid	Winkler	Late Jurassic (Tithonian)	Solnhofen limestone	Germany	A member of Penaeidae. The type species is P. kenngotti.	
Pseudoranina	Gen. et sp. nov	Valid	Charbonnier et al.	Late Cretaceous (Santonian)		Lebanon	A crab, possibly a member of the family Raninidae. Genus includes new species P. guinotae.	
Ramacarcinus	Nom. nov	Valid	De Angeli & Ceccon	Eocene (Ypresian)		Italy	A crab belonging to the family Cancridae; a replacement name for Rama Beschin et al. (2016).	
Rogeryon	Gen. et comb. nov	Valid	Audo et al.	Late Jurassic (Tithonian)	Solnhofen Limestone	Germany	A member of Eryonoidea of uncertain phylogenetic placement; a new genus for "Eryon" oppeli Woodward (1866).	
Scyllarella manleyi	Sp. nov	Valid	Feldmann & Schweitzer	Eocene (Ypresian–Lutetian)	Lookingglass Formation	United States	A slipper lobster.	
Sodakus grethi	Sp. nov	Valid	Schweitzer et al.	Late Cretaceous (Turonian)	Tres Hermanos Formation	United States		
Tauricheles	Gen. et comb. nov	Valid	Audo, Charbonnier & Krobicki	Jurassic (Toarcian–Aalenian)		Crimean Peninsula	A member of the family Polychelidae; a new genus for "Palaeopolycheles" crymensis Levitski (1974).	
Tavernolesia	Gen. et comb. nov	Valid	Artal & Onetti	Eocene (Lutetian)		Spain	A crab belonging to the group Calappoidea. Genus includes "Stenodromia" calasanctii Via (1959)	
Tethysmunida	Gen. et sp. et comb. nov	Valid	De Angeli & Ceccon	Eocene (Ypresian)		Italy	A member of the family Munididae or Munidopsidae. The type species is T. corallina; genus might also include "Faxegalathea" valeccensis Beschin et al. (2016).	
Woodwardicheles	Gen. et comb. nov	Valid	Audo, Charbonnier & Krobicki	Early Cretaceous (Valanginian)		Czech Republic	A member of the family Polychelidae; a new genus for "Eryon" neocomiensis Woodward (1881).	
Yunnanocopia	Gen. et 2 sp. nov	Valid	Feldmann et al.	Middle Triassic (Anisian)		China	A member of Lophogastrida. Genus includes new species Y. grandis and Y. longicauda.	

==== Ostracods ====
Name	Novelty	Status	Authors	Age	Unit	Location	Notes	Images
Acanthoscapha mersinella	Sp. nov	Valid	Forel in Forel et al.	Late Triassic (Carnian)		Turkey	Originally described as a species of Acanthoscapha, but subsequently transferred to the genus Kozuria.	
Acratia chongpani	Sp. nov	Valid	Chitnarin in Chitnarin et al.	Early and Middle Permian	Pha Nok Khao Formation; Tak Fa Formation	Greece; Thailand	A member of the family Acratiidae.	
Acratia kollmanni	Sp. nov	Valid	Forel in Forel et al.	Late Triassic (Carnian)		Turkey	A member of Podocopida belonging to the superfamily Bairdioidea and the family Acratiidae.	
Acratia mongkoli	Sp. nov	Valid	Chitnarin in Chitnarin et al.	Early and Middle Permian	Pha Nok Khao Formation; Tak Fa Formation	Greece; Thailand	A member of the family Acratiidae.	
Arcuaria hebukesarensis	Sp. nov	Valid	Song, Crasquin & Gong	Late Devonian		China		
Bairdia fontainei	Sp. nov	Valid	Chitnarin in Chitnarin et al.	Early and Middle Permian	Pha Nok Khao Formation; Tak Fa Formation	Thailand	A member of the family Bairdiidae.	
Bairdia songthami	Sp. nov	Valid	Chitnarin in Chitnarin et al.	Permian	Nam Maholan Formation; Pha Nok Khao Formation; Tak Fa Formation	Serbia; Thailand	A member of the family Bairdiidae.	
Bairdia hugluensis	Sp. nov	Valid	Forel in Forel et al.	Late Triassic (Carnian)		Turkey	A member of Podocopida belonging to the superfamily Bairdioidea and the family Bairdiidae.	
Bairdia incisedorsa	Sp. nov	Valid	Chitnarin in Chitnarin et al.	Middle Permian	Tak Fa Formation	Thailand	A member of the family Bairdiidae.	
Bairdia khaokanaensis	Sp. nov	Valid	Chitnarin in Chitnarin et al.	Early Permian	Pha Nok Khao Formation	Thailand	A member of the family Bairdiidae.	
Bairdia shaerbuertiensis	Sp. nov	Valid	Song, Crasquin & Gong	Late Devonian		China		
Bairdia songthami	Sp. nov	Valid	Chitnarin in Chitnarin et al.	Early and Middle Permian	Pha Nok Khao Formation; Tak Fa Formation	Thailand	A member of the family Bairdiidae.	
Bairdoppilata barreirinhensis	Sp. nov	Valid	Santos in Santos Filho, Fauth & Piovesan	Cretaceous (Aptian-middle Coniacian)	Barreirinhas Basin; Florianópolis Formation; Guarujá Formation	Brazil	A member of Bairdiidae.	
Baschkirina ruchae	Sp. nov	Valid	Chitnarin in Chitnarin et al.	Early Permian	Nam Maholan Formation; Pha Nok Khao Formation	Thailand	A member of the family Acratiidae.	
Basslerella naresi	Sp. nov	Valid	Chitnarin in Chitnarin et al.	Early Permian	Nam Maholan Formation; Tak Fa Formation	Thailand	A member of the family Cytherideidae.	
Basslerella wipanuae	Sp. nov	Valid	Chitnarin in Chitnarin et al.	Early Permian	Pha Nok Khao Formation; Tak Fa Formation	Thailand	A member of the family Cytherideidae.	
Bollia sinitsae	Sp. nov	Valid	Melnikova	Middle Ordovician	Nalednyi Formation	Russia		
Bungonibeyrichia copelandi	Sp. nov	Valid	Camilleri, Warne & Holloway	Silurian–Devonian		Australia		
Bythoceratina subumbonata	Sp. nov	Valid	Yamaguchi, Matsui & Nishi	Paleocene		Atlantic Ocean floor off the coast of Canada		
Bythoceratina wilsoni	Sp. nov	Valid	Yamaguchi, Matsui & Nishi	Paleocene		Atlantic Ocean floor off the coast of Canada		
Camptocythere (Camptocythere) angustius	Sp. nov	Valid	Tesakova & Shurupova	Middle Jurassic (Bajocian)		Russia	A member of Podocopida belonging to the family Progonocytheridae.	
Camptocythere (Camptocythere) lateres	Sp. nov	Valid	Tesakova & Shurupova	Middle Jurassic (Bajocian and Bathonian)		Russia	A member of Podocopida belonging to the family Progonocytheridae.	
Candona averta	Sp. nov	Valid	Forester et al.	Late Quaternary		United States	A member of Candonidae.	
Candona cerca	Sp. nov	Valid	Forester et al.	Late Quaternary		United States	A member of Candonidae.	
Candona corncreekensis	Sp. nov	Valid	Forester et al.	Late Quaternary		United States	A member of Candonidae.	
Candona coyotespringensis	Sp. nov	Valid	Forester et al.	Late Quaternary		United States	A member of Candonidae.	
Candona mojavensis	Sp. nov	Valid	Forester et al.	Late Quaternary		United States	A member of Candonidae.	
Candona pahrumpensis	Sp. nov	Valid	Forester et al.	Late Quaternary		United States	A member of Candonidae.	
Caspiocypris basilicii	Sp. nov	Valid	Spadi, Gliozzi & Medici	Plio–Pleistocene		Italy	A member of the subfamily Candoninae.	
Caspiocypris perusia	Sp. nov	Valid	Spadi, Gliozzi & Medici	Plio–Pleistocene		Italy	A member of the subfamily Candoninae.	
Caspiocypris posteroacuta	Sp. nov	Valid	Spadi, Gliozzi & Medici	Plio–Pleistocene		Italy	A member of the subfamily Candoninae.	
Caspiocypris tiberina	Sp. nov	Valid	Spadi, Gliozzi & Medici	Plio–Pleistocene		Italy	A member of the subfamily Candoninae.	
Caspiocypris tuderis	Sp. nov	Valid	Spadi, Gliozzi & Medici	Plio–Pleistocene		Italy	A member of the subfamily Candoninae.	
Cherskiella baikalica	Sp. nov	Valid	Melnikova	Middle Ordovician	Nalednyi Formation	Russia		
Citrella? carniana	Sp. nov	Valid	Forel in Forel et al.	Late Triassic (Carnian)		Turkey	A member of Podocopida belonging to the superfamily Cytheroidea and the family Cytheruridae.	
Compositocostata	Gen. et sp. nov	Valid	Sobolev	Carboniferous (Tournaisian)		Russia	A member of Podocopida belonging to the family Bythocytheridae. Genus includes new species C. cumina.	
Cribroconcha honggulelengensis	Sp. nov	Valid	Song, Crasquin & Gong	Late Devonian		China		
Croninocythereis clavae	Sp. nov	Valid	Yamaguchi, Matsui & Nishi	Paleocene (Thanetian)		Atlantic Ocean floor off the coast of Canada	A member of the family Trachyleberididae.	
Cypria kempfi	Sp. nov	Valid	Keyser & Friedrich	Eocene		Germany	A species of Cypria known from Baltic amber.	
Cypridea gujialingensis	Sp. nov	Valid	Wang et al.	Early Cretaceous		China	A species of Cypridea.	
Cyprideis amaru	Sp. nov	Valid	Martínez-García et al.	Miocene		Ecuador		
Cyprideis lojaensis	Sp. nov	Valid	Martínez-García et al.	Miocene		Ecuador		
Cyprideis pachamama	Sp. nov	Valid	Martínez-García et al.	Miocene		Ecuador		
Cyprideis petersonae	Sp. nov	Valid	Martínez-García et al.	Miocene		Ecuador		
Cyprideis tumi	Sp. nov	Valid	Martínez-García et al.	Miocene		Ecuador		
Cypris whatleyi	Sp. nov	Valid	Khosla, Rathore & Nagori	Miocene		Nepal	A member of the family Cyprididae.	
Cytherella ventercavus	Sp. nov	Valid	Santos Filho, Fauth & Piovesan	Late Cretaceous (Turonian-middle Coniacian)	Barreirinhas Basin	Brazil	A member of Cytherellidae.	
Cytherelloidea awaldaensis	Sp. nov	Valid	Chaudhary, Nagori & Bhanat	Late Cretaceous	Bagh Formation	India	A member of the family Cytherellidae.	
Cytherelloidea rosebaidaensis	Sp. nov	Valid	Chaudhary, Nagori & Bhanat	Late Cretaceous	Bagh Formation	India	A member of the family Cytherellidae.	
Cytheropteron americanum	Sp. nov	Valid	Yamaguchi, Matsui & Nishi	Paleocene		Atlantic Ocean floor off the coast of Canada		
Cytheropteron nasutum	Sp. nov	Valid	Yasuhara, Hunt & Okahashi	Late Quaternary		Pacific Ocean (Shatsky Rise)	A member of Podocopida belonging to the superfamily Cytheroidea and the family Cytheruridae.	
Cytheropteron newfoundlandense	Sp. nov	Valid	Yamaguchi, Matsui & Nishi	Paleocene		Atlantic Ocean floor off the coast of Canada		
Cytheropteron? schornikovi	Sp. nov	Valid	Forel in Forel et al.	Late Triassic (Carnian)		Turkey	A member of Podocopida belonging to the superfamily Cytheroidea and the family Cytheruridae.	
Dolerocypria? robinsmithi	Sp. nov	Valid	Matzke-Karasz et al.	Miocene (Aquitanian	La Quinta Formation (Mexican amber)	Mexico	A member of the family Candonidae.	
Editella glyptopleuraformis	Sp. nov	Valid	Sobolev	Carboniferous (Tournaisian)		Russia	A member of Podocopida belonging to the family Editiidae.	
Edithobairdia	Gen. et comb. nov	Valid	Forel in Forel et al.	Late Triassic (Carnian)		Italy; Turkey	A member of Podocopida belonging to the superfamily Bairdioidea and the family Bairdiidae. The type species is E. polyacantha (Kristan-Tollmann, 1978).	
Egorovellina (?) shuvalovae	Sp. nov	Valid	Melnikova	Middle Ordovician	Nalednyi Formation	Russia		
Eucytherura lacerata	Sp. nov	Valid	Forel in Forel et al.	Late Triassic (Carnian)		Turkey	A member of Podocopida belonging to the superfamily Cytheroidea and the family Cytheruridae.	
Eucytherura macropora pygmaea	Subsp. nov	Valid	Ohmert	Oligocene	Middle Pechelbronn Formation	Germany		
Fabalicypris hathaithipae	Sp. nov	Valid	Chitnarin in Chitnarin et al.	Early Permian	Pha Nok Khao Formation; Tak Fa Formation	Thailand	A member of the family Bairdiidae.	
Gencella	Gen. et sp. nov	Valid	Forel in Forel et al.	Late Triassic (Carnian)		Turkey	A member of Podocopida belonging to the superfamily Bairdioidea and the family Beecherellidae. The type species is G. taurensis.	
Glandites planus	Sp. nov	Valid	Melnikova	Middle Ordovician	Nalednyi Formation	Russia		
Gontiella	Gen. et sp. nov	Valid	Melnikova	Middle Ordovician	Nalednyi Formation	Russia	Genus includes new species G. mira.	
Hallatina opima	Sp. nov	Valid	Melnikova	Middle Ordovician	Nalednyi Formation	Russia		
Hammatocythere oertlii tarda	Subsp. nov	Valid	Ohmert	Oligocene	Middle Pechelbronn Formation	Germany		
Hammatocythere xenae	Sp. nov	Valid	Ohmert	Oligocene	Middle Pechelbronn Formation	Germany		
Heterocypris ballentae	Sp. nov	Valid	Martínez-García et al.	Miocene		Ecuador		
Hollinella (Hollinella) lungcamensis	Sp. nov	Valid	Crasquin in Crasquin et al.	Latest Permian and earliest Triassic	Hong Ngai Formation	Vietnam	A member of Palaeocopida belonging to the family Hollinellidae.	
Kerocythere dorsidenticulata	Sp. nov	Valid	Forel in Forel et al.	Late Triassic (Carnian)		Turkey	A member of Podocopida belonging to the superfamily Cytheroidea and the family Cytheruridae.	
Kerocythere tricostata	Sp. nov	Valid	Forel in Forel et al.	Late Triassic (Carnian)		Turkey	A member of Podocopida belonging to the superfamily Cytheroidea and the family Cytheruridae.	
Legitimocythere stellae	Sp. nov	Valid	Yasuhara, Hunt & Okahashi	Late Quaternary		Pacific Ocean (Shatsky Rise)	A member of Podocopida belonging to the superfamily Cytheroidea and the family Trachyleberididae.	
Leperditella nalednaya	Sp. nov	Valid	Melnikova	Middle Ordovician	Nalednyi Formation	Russia		
Liuzhinia naramasei	Sp. nov	Valid	Chitnarin in Chitnarin et al.	Early Permian	Pha Nok Khao Formation; Tak Fa Formation	Thailand	A member of the family Acratiidae.	
Microchelinella bulongourensis	Sp. nov	Valid	Song, Crasquin & Gong	Late Devonian		China		
Microchelinella hoxtolgayensis	Sp. nov	Valid	Song, Crasquin & Gong	Late Devonian		China		
Monoceratina praevulsaformis	Sp. nov	Valid	Forel in Forel et al.	Late Triassic (Carnian)		Turkey	A member of Podocopida belonging to the superfamily Cytheroidea and the family Bythocytheridae.	
Nemoceratina (Pariceratina) guerneti	Sp. nov	Valid	Yamaguchi, Matsui & Nishi	Paleocene		Atlantic Ocean floor off the coast of Canada		
Paralimnocythere umbra	Sp. nov	Valid	Spadi, Gliozzi & Medici	Plio–Pleistocene		Italy	A member of the subfamily Limnocytherinae.	
Parapontoparta lagranjae	Sp. nov	Valid	Matzke-Karasz et al.	Miocene (Aquitanian	La Quinta Formation (Mexican amber)	Mexico	A member of the family Candonidae.	
Patellacythere tourkosella	Sp. nov	Valid	Forel in Forel et al.	Late Triassic (Carnian)		Turkey	A member of Podocopida belonging to the superfamily Cytheroidea and the family Bythocytheridae.	
Petasobairdia campbelli	Sp. nov	Valid	Chitnarin in Chitnarin et al.	Early and Middle Permian	Tak Fa Formation	Thailand; United States	A member of the family Bairdiidae.	
Phacorhabdotus flabellicarinus	Sp. nov	Valid	Yamaguchi, Matsui & Nishi	Late Cretaceous (Maastrichtian) to early Eocene		North Atlantic Ocean	A member of the family Trachyleberididae.	
Plicocandona	Gen. et 5 sp. nov	Valid	Forester et al.	Late Quaternary		United States	A member of Candonidae. The type species is P. valentis; genus also includes P. cassicula, P. macraina, P. sagena and P. striola.	
Polycope kilekensis	Sp. nov	Valid	Forel in Forel et al.	Late Triassic (Carnian)		Turkey	A member of the family Polycopidae.	
Poseidonamicus norrisi	Sp. nov	Valid	Yamaguchi, Matsui & Nishi	Middle and late Paleocene		North Atlantic Ocean	A member of the family Thaerocytheridae.	
Poseidonamicus shatskyensis	Sp. nov	Valid	Yasuhara, Hunt & Okahashi	Late Quaternary		Pacific Ocean (Shatsky Rise)	A member of Podocopida belonging to the superfamily Cytheroidea and the family Thaerocytheridae.	
Potamocypris nepalensis	Sp. nov	Valid	Khosla, Rathore & Nagori	Miocene		Nepal	A species of Potamocypris	
Potiguarella maranhensis	Sp. nov	Valid	Santos Filho, Fauth & Piovesan	Late Cretaceous (Turonian-middle Coniacian)	Barreirinhas Basin	Brazil	A member of Trachyleberididae.	
Pribylites junggarensis	Sp. nov	Valid	Song, Crasquin & Gong	Late Devonian		China		
Pribylites wulankeshunensis	Sp. nov	Valid	Song, Crasquin & Gong	Late Devonian		China		
Primitia kalarensis	Sp. nov	Valid	Melnikova	Middle Ordovician	Nalednyi Formation	Russia		
Ptychobairdia praekristanae	Sp. nov	Valid	Forel in Forel et al.	Late Triassic (Carnian)		Turkey	A member of Podocopida belonging to the superfamily Bairdioidea and the family Bairdiidae.	
Rossicuvillierina	Nom. nov	Valid	Brandão	Pleistocene		Argentina	A member of Podocopida belonging to the family Hemicytheridae; a replacement name for Cuvillierina Rossi de García (1972).	
Ryugucivis blumi	Sp. nov	Valid	Yamaguchi, Matsui & Nishi	Paleocene (Danian and Selandian)		Atlantic Ocean floor off the coast of Canada	A member of the family Trachyleberididae.	
Serrocytheridea witti	Sp. nov	Valid	Ohmert	Oligocene	Middle Pechelbronn Formation	Germany		
Silenites sureeae	Sp. nov	Valid	Chitnarin in Chitnarin et al.	Early and Middle Permian	Nam Maholan Formation; Pha Nok Khao Formation; Tak Fa Formation	Thailand	A member of the family Bairdiidae.	
Simeonella daginikella	Sp. nov	Valid	Forel in Forel et al.	Late Triassic (Carnian)		Turkey	A member of Podocopida belonging to the superfamily Cytheroidea and the family Limnocytheridae.	
Spinomicrocheilinella reliquiaella	Sp. nov	Valid	Forel in Forel et al.	Late Triassic (Carnian)		Turkey	A member of Podocopida belonging to the superfamily Sigillioidea and the family Microcheilinellidae.	
Strumibythere simplex	Sp. nov	Valid	Sobolev	Carboniferous (Tournaisian)		Russia	A member of Podocopida belonging to the family Bythocytheridae.	
Thalassocypria cumangulus	Sp. nov	Valid	Matzke-Karasz et al.	Miocene (Aquitanian	La Quinta Formation (Mexican amber)	Mexico	A member of the family Candonidae.	
Thalassocypria electri	Sp. nov	Valid	Matzke-Karasz et al.	Miocene (Aquitanian	La Quinta Formation (Mexican amber)	Mexico	A member of the family Candonidae.	
Thalassocypria nicokaraszi	Sp. nov	Valid	Matzke-Karasz et al.	Miocene (Aquitanian	La Quinta Formation (Mexican amber)	Mexico	A member of the family Candonidae.	
Thalassocypria resinae	Sp. nov	Valid	Matzke-Karasz et al.	Miocene (Aquitanian	La Quinta Formation (Mexican amber)	Mexico	A member of the family Candonidae.	
Trachyleberidea cronini	Sp. nov	Valid	Yamaguchi, Matsui & Nishi	Early Paleocene to late Oligocene		Atlantic Ocean; Spain	A member of the family Trachyleberididae.	
Triassocythere tavuscayiriensis	Sp. nov	Valid	Forel in Forel et al.	Late Triassic (Carnian)		Turkey	A member of Podocopida belonging to the superfamily Cytheroidea and the family Bythocytheridae.	
Zonocypris curvicostata	Sp. nov	Valid	Khosla, Rathore & Nagori	Miocene		Nepal	A member of the family Cyprididae.	

==== Other crustaceans ====
Name	Novelty	Status	Authors	Age	Unit	Location	Notes	Images
Estherites? jocelynae	Sp. nov	Valid	Stigall, Plotnick & Park Boush	Early Oligocene	Medicine Lodge Formation	United States	A clam shrimp belonging to the superfamily Estheriteoidea.	
Liaoxiestheria	Gen. et sp. nov	Valid	Liao, Shen & Huang	Middle–Late Jurassic	Linglongta beds	China	A clam shrimp. The type species is L. linglongtaensis.	
Litholepas	Gen. et sp. nov	Valid	Nagler et al.	Late Jurassic		Germany	A goose barnacle belonging to the family Eolepadidae. Genus includes new species L. klausreschi.	
Ordosestheria chottsensis	Sp. nov	Valid	Li et al.	Early Cretaceous (early Barremian)	Bouhedma Formation	Tunisia	A clam shrimp.	
Punctatestheria	Gen. et 2 sp. et comb. nov	Valid	Zhang et al.	Jurassic	Badaowan Formation; Qiketai Formation	China; United Kingdom	A clam shrimp. The type species is P. lianmuqinensis; genus also includes new species P. karamayensis, as well as "Euestheria" trotternishensis Chen & Hudson (1991).	
Rossolimnadiopsis hanskerpi	Sp. nov	Valid	Scholze et al.	Early Triassic	Ma'in Formation	Jordan	A clam shrimp.	
Surreyestheria	Gen. et sp. nov	Valid	Liao et al.	Early Cretaceous (Barremian)	Upper Weald Clay Formation	United Kingdom	A clam shrimp belonging to the family Afrograptidae. The type species is S. ockleyensis.	
Yunnanocyclus	Gen. et sp. nov	Valid	Feldmann et al.	Middle Triassic (Anisian)	Guanling Formation	China	A member of Cyclida. Genus includes new species Y. nodosus.	

== Trilobites ==
=== Research ===
- Three specimens of Megistaspis (Ekeraspis) hammondi preserving appendages and digestive tract are described from the Ordovician Fezouata Konservat-Lagerstätte (Morocco) by Gutiérrez-Marco et al. (2017).
- A moulted specimen of Telephina intermedia with one of the compound eyes showing traces of serious damage which has healed is described from the Ordovician (Darriwilian) Elnes Formation (Norway) by Schoenemann, Clarkson & Høyberget (2017).
- Eggs preserved with two specimens of Triarthrus eatoni are described from the Ordovician Lorraine Group (upstate New York, United States) by Hegna, Martin & Darroch (2017).
- Extraordinarily preserved appendages of the metadoxidid species Hongshiyanaspis yiliangensis are described from the Cambrian Hongjingshao Formation (Yunnan, China) by Zeng et al. (2017).
- Digestive structures of two species of Cambrian trilobites from China (Palaeolenus lantenoisi and Redlichia mansuyi) are described by Hopkins et al. (2017).
- Remnants of cellular systems are identified in the compound eye of Schmidtiellus reetae from the Cambrian of Estonia by Schoenemann, Pärnaste & Clarkson (2017).

=== New taxa ===
Name	Novelty	Status	Authors	Age	Unit	Location	Notes	Images
Adrisiops	Gen. et sp. et comb. nov	Valid	Van Viersen, Holland & Koppka	Devonian (late Emsian to Eifelian)	El Otfal Formation	Algeria; Morocco	A member of Phacopidae. The type species is A. weugi; genus also includes "Phacops" boudjemaai Khaldi et al. (2016) and "Geesops" fabrei Khaldi et al. (2016).	
Agraulos lewisi	Sp. nov	Valid	Fletcher	Cambrian		United Kingdom		
Austerops couvinensis	Sp. nov	Valid	Van Viersen, Taghon & Magrean	Devonian (Eifelian)	Jemelle Formation	Belgium	A member of Phacopida.	
Austerops hottonensis	Sp. nov	Valid	Van Viersen, Taghon & Magrean	Devonian (Eifelian)	Jemelle Formation	Belgium	A member of Phacopida.	
Cyrtoproetus kerhini	Sp. nov	Valid	Brezinski	Carboniferous (late Mississippian)	Fayetteville Formation	United States		
Declivolithus titan	Sp. nov	Valid	Fortey & Edgecombe	Ordovician (Katian)	Lower Ktaoua Formation	Morocco	A member of the family Trinucleidae.	
Elrathia groenlandica	Sp. nov	Junior homonym	Geyer & Peel	Cambrian	Ekspedition Bræ Formation	Greenland	The specific name is preoccupied by Elrathia? groenlandica Poulsen (1927). Geyer & Peel (2020) coined a replacement name Elrathia hensonensis.	
Elrathina aphrodite	Sp. nov	Valid	Geyer & Peel	Cambrian	Ekspedition Bræ Formation	Greenland		
Elrathina athena	Sp. nov	Valid	Geyer & Peel	Cambrian	Ekspedition Bræ Formation	Greenland		
Elrathina hera	Sp. nov	Valid	Geyer & Peel	Cambrian	Ekspedition Bræ Formation	Greenland		
Holmdalia glabra	Sp. nov	Valid	Westrop & Dengler	Camnrian (Guzhangian)		Canada		
Holmdalia lata	Sp. nov	Valid	Westrop & Dengler	Camnrian (Guzhangian)		Canada		
Holmdalia palpebra	Sp. nov	Valid	Westrop & Dengler	Camnrian (Drumian)		Canada		
Holmdalia tenaga	Sp. nov	Valid	Westrop & Dengler	Camnrian (Drumian)		Canada		
Holmdalia tubercula	Sp. nov	Valid	Westrop & Dengler	Camnrian (Guzhangian)		Canada		
Hottonops	Gen. et sp. nov	Valid	Van Viersen, Taghon & Magrean	Devonian (Eifelian)		Belgium	A member of Phacopida. Genus includes new species H. daumeriesi.	
Illaenus (Baltillaenus)	Subgen. nov	Valid	Krylov	Ordovician		Estonia; Poland; Russia; Sweden	A subgenus of Illaenus. The type species is Illaenus laticlavius Eichwald (1860); the subgenus also includes I. plautini Holm (1886), I. glabrisculus Jaanusson (1957) and I. incisus Jaanusson (1957).	
Illaenus (Pseudoillaenus)	Subgen. et comb. nov	Valid	Krylov	Ordovician		Estonia; Russia	A subgenus of Illaenus. The type species is "Entomostracites" tauricornis Kutorga (1848); the subgenus also includes I. wahlenbergi (Eichwald, 1825), I. schuberti Nielsen (1995), I. dalmani Volborth (1863) and I. sarsi Jaanusson (1954).	
Illaenus (Rutheniaeillaenus)	Subgen. et sp. nov	Valid	Krylov	Ordovician		Estonia; Poland; Russia; Sweden	A subgenus of Illaenus. The type species is Illaenus jevensis Holm (1886); the subgenus also includes I. sphaericus Holm (1882) and I. sulcifrons Holm (1886), as well as new species I. dubari.	
Illaenus (Trigonillaenus)	Subgen. et comb. 2 sp. nov	Valid	Krylov	Ordovician		Estonia; Finland; Germany; Poland; Russia	A subgenus of Illaenus. The type species is "Wossekia" brevispina Krylov (2010); the subgenus also includes Illaenus schmidti Nieszkowski (1857), I. sinuatus Holm (1886) and I. slancyensis Krylov (2016), as well as new species I. kotlukovae and I. volkhovensis.	
Illaenus welchi	Sp. nov	Valid	Loch & Ethington	Ordovician (Whiterock Stage)	Antelope Valley Limestone; Ninemile Formation	United States		
Iputaspis	Gen. et sp. nov	Valid	McCobb & Popov	Ordovician (Katian)	Mayatas Formation	Kazakhstan	A trinucleid trilobite. Genus includes new species I. stepnyakensis.	
Kaskia pitkinensis	Sp. nov	Valid	Brezinski	Carboniferous (late Mississippian)	Pitkin Formation	United States		
Kettneraspis knoppi	Sp. nov	Valid	Basse & Müller	Devonian		Germany		
Kettneraspis ralphi	Sp. nov	Valid	Basse & Müller	Devonian		Germany		
Kingaspidoides alberti	Sp. nov	Valid	Geyer	Cambrian Stage 5	Tannenknock Formation	Germany		
Kingaspidoides meieri	Sp. nov	Valid	Geyer	Cambrian Stage 5	Tannenknock Formation	Germany		
Loreleiops	Gen. et sp. et comb. nov	Valid	Van Viersen, Taghon & Magrean	Devonian (Eifelian-Givetian)	Jemelle Formation	Belgium; Germany	A member of Phacopida. Genus includes new species L. suffeleersi, as well as "Pedinopariops" simulator Basse (1998) and "Pedinopariops" hoelleri van Viersen, Prescher & Savelsbergh (2009).	
Michaspis jucunda	Sp. nov	Valid	Pegel & Shabanov in Pegel et al.	Middle Cambrian		Russia	A member of Ptychopariida belonging to the family Proasaphiscidae.	
Morocops spinifer	Sp. nov	Valid	Van Viersen, Holland & Koppka	Devonian (late Emsian)	Khebchia Formation	Morocco	A member of Phacopidae.	
Octillaenus marocanus	Sp. nov	Valid	Pereira et al.	Late Ordovician (Katian)	Upper Ktaoua Formation	Morocco	A member of the family Illaenidae.	
Parasolenopleura parabolica	Sp. nov	Valid	Geyer	Cambrian Stage 5	Tannenknock Formation	Germany		
Parasolenopleura wurmi	Sp. nov	Valid	Geyer	Cambrian Stage 5	Tannenknock Formation	Germany		
Pengia palsgaardia	Sp. nov	Valid	Ebbestad & Weidner	Cambrian		Denmark	A member of Burlingiidae.	
Platypeltoides carmenae	Sp. nov	Valid	Corbacho et al.	Ordovician (Tremadocian)	Lower Fezouata Formation	Morocco	A member of the family Nileidae.	
Pseudophillipsia (Carniphillipsia) dizluensis	Sp. nov	Valid	Ameri, Yazdi & Bahrami	Permian (Wordian)	Jamal Formation	Iran	A member of the family Phillipsiidae.	
Shantungia liui	Sp. nov	Valid	Ren, Wei & Yuan	Cambrian (Guzhangian)	Kushan Formation	China	A member of the family Damesellidae.	
Skreiaspis punctatissimus	Sp. nov	Valid	Fletcher	Cambrian		Canada		
Tafilaltaspis ahrensi	Sp. nov	Valid	Basse & Müller	Devonian	Leun Limestone	Germany		
Vysocania moraveci	Sp. nov	Valid	Pereira et al.	Late Ordovician (probably Sandbian)	Letná Formation; Libeň Formation	Czech Republic	A member of the family Illaenidae.	

== Other arthropods ==
=== Research ===
- Nielsen, Rasmussen & Harper (2017) confirm the presence of dimorphism in a large sample of individuals of Isoxys volucris from the Cambrian Sirius Passet Lagerstätte (Greenland), which they interpret as likely sexual dimorphism.
- A redescription of Utahcaris orion based on a restudy of the original material is published by Legg & Pates (2017).
- A study on the phylogenetic relationships of Enalikter aphson is published by Parry, Legg & Sutton (2017), who support the original interpretation of the species as an arthropod.
- A study on the lateral tail flexibility in the eurypterid Slimonia acuminata based on a new specimen is published by Persons & Acorn (2017).
- Traces produced by swimming eurypterids are described from the Silurian Williamsville Formation (Ontario, Canada) and Tonoloway Formation (Pennsylvania, United States) by Vrazo & Ciurca (2017), who name a new ichnotaxon Arcuites bertiensis.
- Description of the anatomy of the Triassic horseshoe crab species Yunnanolimulus luopingensis based on specimens with well preserved appendages and soft tissues, recovered from the Guanling Formation (China), is published by Hu et al. (2017).
- A study on the phylogenetic relationships of Rhyniognatha hirsti is published by Haug & Haug (2017) who consider this taxon to be more likely a myriapod (possibly a centipede) rather than an insect.
- A study on the age of the Cowie Harbour Fish Bed (Scotland, United Kingdom), containing fish and arthropod fossils (including the millipede Pneumodesmus newmani), is published by Suarez et al. (2017).
- A study on the microstructural details of the cuticle of the concavicarid thylacocephalans from the Devonian (Famennian) of Poland, identifying possible remains of sensory system, is published by Broda & Zatoń (2017).
- A review of the research history, distribution, anatomy, ontogeny and inferred mode of life of Agnostus pisiformis is published by Eriksson & Horn (2017), who also present enlarged three-dimensional sculptural models of members of the species.
- A restudy of the Burgess Shale arthropod Habelia based on known and new specimens is published by Aria & Caron (2017), who interpret Habelia as a close relative of Sanctacaris uncata and name a new arachnomorph order Habeliida.

=== New taxa ===
Name	Novelty	Status	Authors	Age	Unit	Location	Notes	Images
Acutobalteus	Gen. et sp. nov	Valid	Betts et al.	Early Cambrian		Australia	A member of Bradoriida. Genus includes new species A. sinuosus.	
Ankitokazocaris chaohuensis	Sp. nov	Valid	Ji et al.	Early Triassic		China	A member of Thylacocephala (a group of arthropods of uncertain phylogenetic placement, possibly crustaceans).	
Antarcticarcinus	Gen. et sp. nov	Valid	Collette, Isbell & Miller	Permian	Pagoda Formation	Antarctica	A member of Euthycarcinoidea. Genus includes new species A. pagoda.	
Beyrichona avannga	Sp. nov	Valid	Peel	Cambrian Stage 4		Greenland	A member of Bradoriida.	
Diploaspis praecursor	Sp. nov	Valid	Lamsdell & Briggs	Late Silurian	Phelps Member of the Fiddlers Green Formation (Bertie Group)	United States		
Eozetetes	Gen. et sp. nov	Valid	Edgecombe, Paterson & García-Bellido	Early Cambrian	Emu Bay Shale	Australia	A member of Euarthropoda of uncertain phylogenetic placement, might be related to aglaspidids or Emeraldella. The type species is Eozetetes gemmelli.	
Eozhexiella	Gen. et sp. nov	Valid	Betts et al.	Early Cambrian		Australia	A member of Bradoriida. Genus includes new species E. adnyamathanha.	
Globulocaris	Gen. et sp. nov		Teruzzi & Charbonnier in Charbonnier et al.	Late Cretaceous (Cenomanian)		Lebanon	A member of Thylacocephala belonging to the group Concavicarida and the family Protozoeidae. The type species is G. garassinoi.	
Glypharthrus magnoculus	Sp. nov	Valid	Lerosey-Aubril et al.	Cambrian (Furongian)	McKay Group	Canada	A member of Aglaspidida.	
Glypharthrus trispinicaudatus	Sp. nov		Lerosey-Aubril, Zhu & Ortega-Hernández	Cambrian (Jiangshanian)	Sandu Formation	China	A member of Aglaspidida belonging to the family Aglaspididae.	
Hamaticaris	Gen. et comb. nov		Charbonnier in Charbonnier et al.	Late Cretaceous (Santonian)		Lebanon	A member of Thylacocephala belonging to the group Concavicarida and the family Protozoeidae. The type species is "Protozoea" damesi Roger (1946).	
Hipponicharion skovstedi	Sp. nov	Valid	Peel	Cambrian Stage 4		Greenland	A member of Bradoriida.	
Itagnostus subhastatus	Sp. nov	Valid	Geyer & Peel	Cambrian	Ekspedition Bræ Formation	Greenland	A member of Agnostida (a group of arthropods of uncertain phylogenetic placement, possibly trilobites).	
Keelicaris	Gen. et sp. nov		Teruzzi & Charbonnier in Charbonnier et al.	Late Cretaceous (Santonian)		Lebanon	A member of Thylacocephala belonging to the group Concavicarida and the family Microcarididae. The type species is K. deborae.	
Leanchoilia obesa	Sp. nov	Valid	He et al.	Cambrian		China		
Limulitella tejraensis	Sp. nov	Valid	Błażejowski et al.	Middle Triassic (Anisian–early Ladinian)	Ouled Chebbi Formation	Tunisia	A horseshoe crab.	
Lotagnostus matthewi	Sp. nov	Valid	Westrop & Landing	Cambrian (Furongian)	Chelsey Drive Group	Canada	A member of Agnostida (a group of arthropods of uncertain phylogenetic placement, possibly trilobites)	
Lotagnostus salteri	Sp. nov	Valid	Westrop & Landing	Cambrian (Furongian)	Chelsey Drive Group	Canada	A member of Agnostida (a group of arthropods of uncertain phylogenetic placement, possibly trilobites)	
Manawarra	Gen. et sp. nov	Valid	Betts et al.	Early Cambrian		Australia	A member of Bradoriida. Genus includes new species M. jonesi.	
Mengdongella	Gen. et sp. nov	Valid	Zhang & Xiao	Cambrian (Paibian)	Wangcun Lagerstätte	China	A bivalved arthropod of uncertain phylogenetic placement. Genus includes new species M. elliptica.	
Mimetaster florestaensis	Sp. nov	Valid	Aris et al.	Ordovician (early Tremadocian)	Floresta Formation	Argentina	A member of Marrellida belonging to the family Mimetasteridae.	
Molaria steini	Sp. nov	Valid	Peel	Cambrian Stage 3	Sirius Passet Lagerstätte	Greenland		
Mongolitubulus decensus	Sp. nov	Valid	Betts et al.	Early Cambrian		Australia	A member of Bradoriida.	
Navarana	Gen. et comb. nov	Valid	Peel	Cambrian		Greenland	A member of Bradoriida; a new genus for "Hipponicharion" pearylandica Peel et al. (2016).	
Occacaris lazizhaiensis	Sp. nov	Valid	Wen et al.	Cambrian	Balang Formation	China		
Paleolimulus kunguricus	Sp. nov	Valid	Naugolnykh	Permian (Kungurian)	Shurtan Formation	Russia	A xiphosuran.	
Paradollocaris	Gen. et sp. nov		Charbonnier in Charbonnier et al.	Late Cretaceous (Cenomanian)		Lebanon	A member of Thylacocephala belonging to the group Conchyliocarida and the family Dollocarididae. The type species is P. vannieri.	
Siphoniulus muelleri	Sp. nov	Valid	Liu, Rühr & Wesener	Late Cretaceous	Burmese amber	Myanmar	A millipede, a species of Siphoniulus.	
Siphoniulus preciosus	Sp. nov	Valid	Liu, Rühr & Wesener	Late Cretaceous	Burmese amber	Myanmar	A millipede, a species of Siphoniulus.	
Thylacocaris	Gen. et sp. nov		Audo & Charbonnier in Charbonnier et al.	Late Cretaceous (Cenomanian)		Lebanon	A member of Thylacocephala belonging to the group Conchyliocarida and the family Dollocarididae. The type species is T. schrami.	
Tokummia	Gen. et sp. nov	Valid	Aria & Caron	Cambrian Stage 5	Stephen Formation	Canada	A large bivalved arthropod belonging to the order Hymenocarina and the family Protocarididae. Genus includes new species T. katalepsis.	
Tuzoia jianheensis	Sp. nov	Valid	Chen et al.	Cambrian		China		
Vaderlimulus	Gen. et sp. nov	Valid	Lerner, Lucas & Lockley	Early Triassic (Olenekian)	Thaynes Group	United States	A xiphosuran belonging to the family Austrolimulidae. Genus includes new species V. tricki.	
Xandarella mauretanica	Sp. nov		Ortega-Hernández et al.	Cambrian Stage 5	Tatelt Formation	Morocco	A member of Artiopoda belonging to the group Xandarellida. El Albani et al. (2024) reclassified it as a species of trilobite genus Gigoutella.	

== See also ==
2017 in paleontology
