= P. rathbuni =

P. rathbuni may refer to:

- Paralithodes rathbuni, a species of king crab
- Propebela rathbuni, a species of sea snail in the family Mangeliidae
