= Notopus dorsipes =

Scientific classification
- Kingdom: Animalia
- Phylum: Arthropoda
- Class: Malacostraca
- Order: Decapoda
- Suborder: Pleocyemata
- Infraorder: Brachyura
- Family: Raninidae
- Genus: Notopus
- Species: N. dorsipes

Binomial name
- Notopus dorsipes (Linnaeus, 1758)

Synonyms
- Cancer dorsipes Linnaeus, 1758; Dorippe dorsipes (Linnaeus, 1758); Ranilia dorsipes (Linnaeus, 1758)

Species of crab

Notopus dorsipes is a species of frog crab from the family Raninidae which has an Indo-Pacific distribution and which has recently spread into the eastern Mediterranean. It is the only extant species in the genus Notopus.

== Description ==
Notopus dorsipes has a carapace which is broadened anteriorly and regularly convex from side to side with no median dorsal carina. There is a transverse ridge of small spines between the larger antero-lateral spines on an otherwise smooth surface. The front border of the orbit is less than half the width of carapace at its widest point and has five fronto-orbital spines. The antero-lateral borders have a single spine. The thin eye stalk folds backwards and downwards obliquely. The dorsal border of the cheliped palm lacks spines. The fifth pereiopod, is slightly smaller compared to the preceding pereiopods. The pereiopods are fringed with long, thin bristles with a broad dactylus and a flattened merus and carpus. The carapace length is up to 25mm. The carapace is coloured bright reddish-brown with white mottling and there is a pair of obvious spots on either side of the carapace near the middle.

== Distribution ==
Notopus dorsipes is found in the Indian and Pacific Oceans from the Red Sea and eastern Africa to Japan to the Great Barrier Reef, although there are few records from the Sunda Shelf region in south-east Asia. It was recorded in the Mediterranean for the first time in 1964 off Israel and off the Egyptian coast in 2000 and 2016. The species is now most likely established in the Mediterranean and the probable route of colonisation was from the Red Sea via the Suez Canal, i.e. Lessepsian migration.

== Biology ==
Notopus dorsipes is a burrowing animal of shallow seas with sandy substrates. To burrow it lifts the anterior end of its body using the chelipeds digging backwards at an angle. The chelipeds are used to push the animal backwards while burrowing. The burrowing is quick, the flattened and spade-like dactylus of the periopods is used to burrow, and the crab can bury itself completely in the sand in a matter of seconds.
