= P. californiensis =

P. californiensis may refer to:

- Paralithodes californiensis, a species of king crab
- Paregesta californiensis, a species of moth in the family Crambidae
- Pyrgulopsis californiensis, a species of small freshwater snail in the family Hydrobiidae
