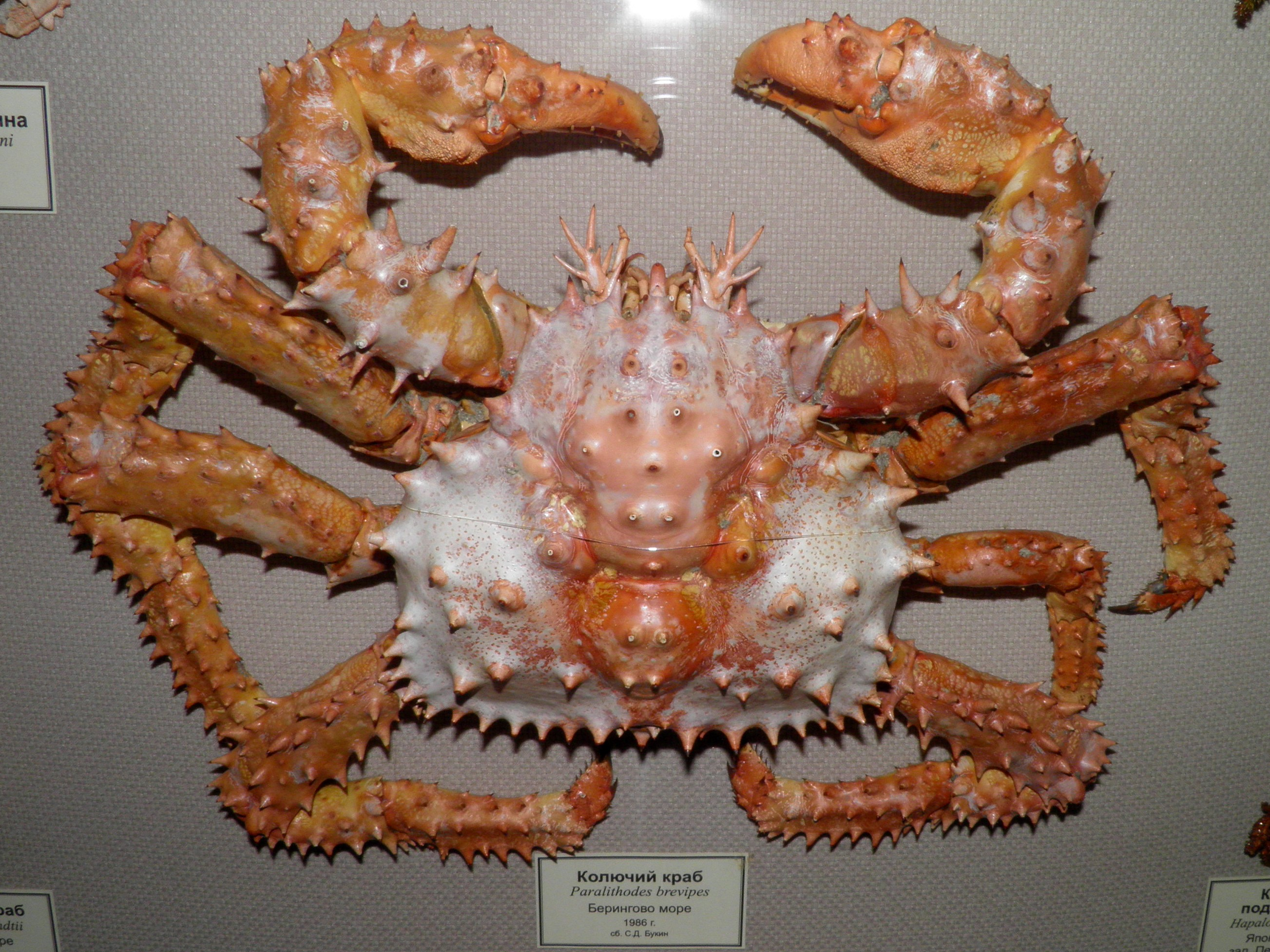

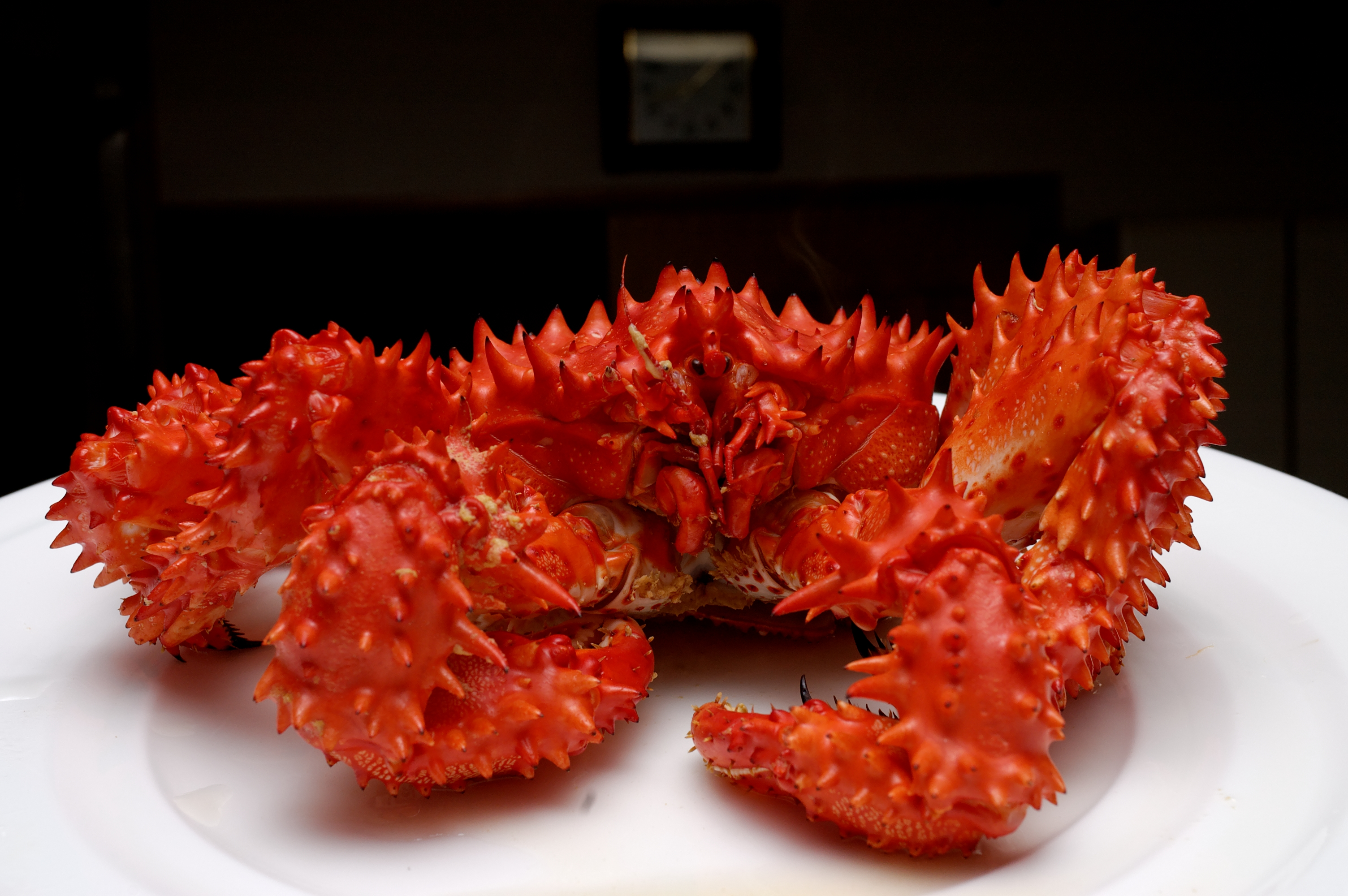

Scientific classification
- Kingdom: Animalia
- Phylum: Arthropoda
- Clade: Pancrustacea
- Class: Malacostraca
- Order: Decapoda
- Suborder: Pleocyemata
- Infraorder: Anomura
- Family: Lithodidae
- Genus: Paralithodes
- Species: P. brevipes

Binomial name
- Paralithodes brevipes Milne-Edwards & Lucas

= Paralithodes brevipes =

Species of king crab

Paralithodes brevipes (ハナサキガニ, Hanasakigani), also known as the spiny king crab and sometimes the brown king crab, is a species of king crab. It has a limited distribution in cold, shallow waters as far south as the coast of Hokkaido, where male-only fishing has damaged the reproductive success of the species, up to as far north as the southwest Bering Sea.

It is known to be parasitized by Hematodinium.

== Reproductive behavior ==
Male P. brevipes guard females prior to copulation, spending less time doing so when females are more numerous. The reproductive success of the species is heavily sensitive to the ratio of male to female crabs. Because sperm recovery in P. brevipes occurs at a slow rate, males allocate sperm dependent on the size of the female.

== Bibliography ==
- Stevens, Bradley G., ed. (2014). King Crabs of the World: Biology and Fisheries Management. CRC Press. doi:10.1201/b16664. ISBN 978-0-429-06317-6. LCCN 2013036692.
