= Eumorphocorystes =

Eumorphocorystes Temporal range: Maastrichtian-Oligocene ~70–23 Ma

Scientific classification
- Kingdom: Animalia
- Phylum: Arthropoda
- Clade: Pancrustacea
- Class: Malacostraca
- Order: Decapoda
- Suborder: Pleocyemata
- Infraorder: Brachyura
- Family: Raninidae
- Subfamily: Notopodinae
- Genus: †Eumorphocorystes; Binkhorst, 1857

Species
- E. naselensis; E. sculptus

Extinct genus of crabs

Eumorphocorystes is a genus of crab belonging to the Raninidae subfamily Notopodinae. Fossils of the genus have been found in the Late Cretaceous (Maastrichtian) Maastricht Formation of the Netherlands. Rathbun referred specimens from the Oligocene Stepovak Formation of Alaska to this genus.
