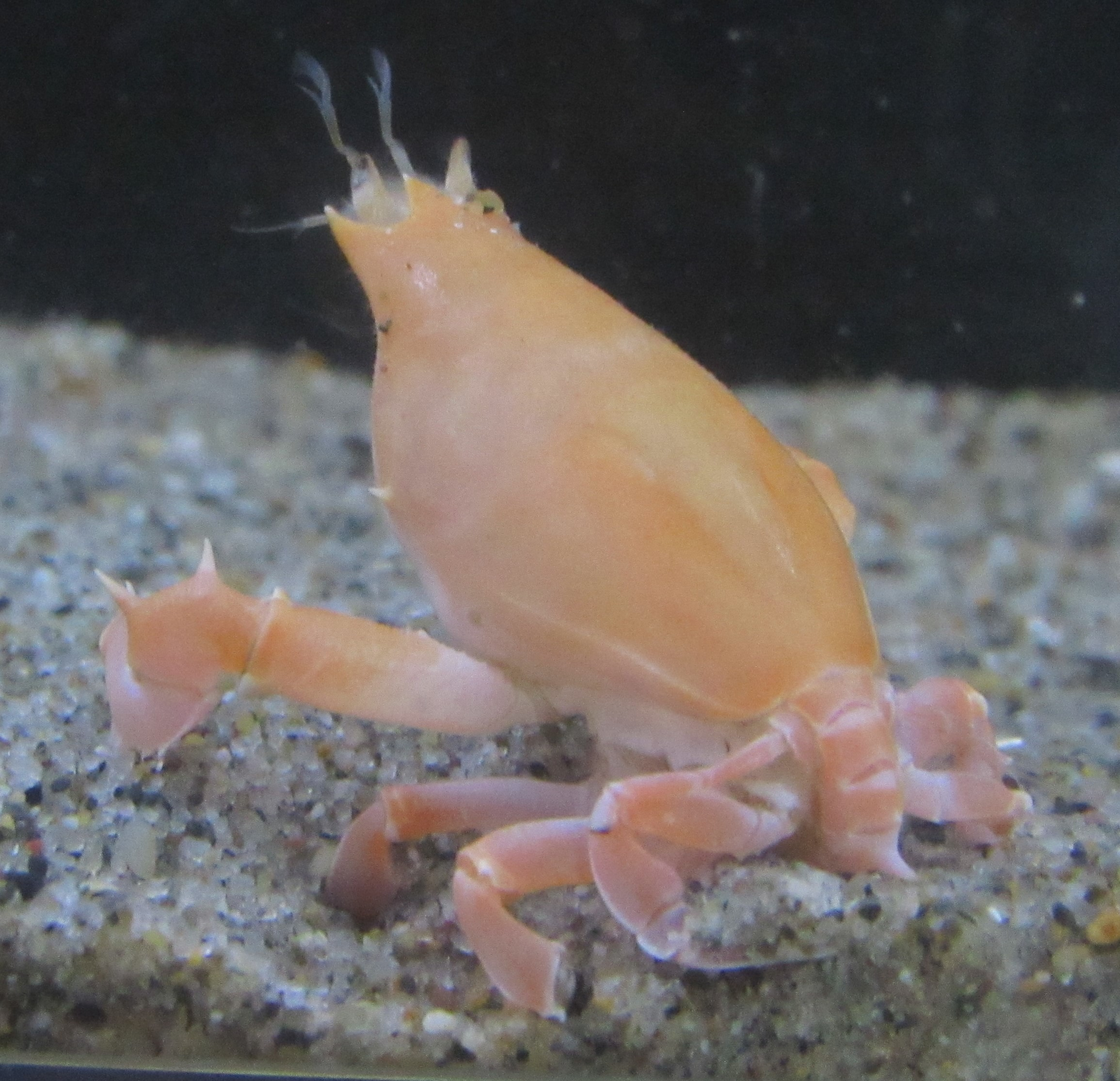

Scientific classification
- Kingdom: Animalia
- Phylum: Arthropoda
- Clade: Pancrustacea
- Class: Malacostraca
- Order: Decapoda
- Suborder: Pleocyemata
- Infraorder: Brachyura
- Family: Raninidae
- Genus: Lyreidus
- Species: L. tridentatus

Binomial name
- Lyreidus tridentatus de Haan, 1841

Synonyms
- Lyreidus australiensis Ward, 1933; Lyreidus elongatus Miers, 1879; Lyreidus fossor Bennett, 1964

= Lyreidus tridentatus =

Species of crab

Lyreidus tridentatus, commonly known as the harp crab, is a species of crab in the family Raninidae.

The species is distributed across the Western Pacific, with specimens found in the Kermadec Islands, New Zealand, Australia, New Caledonia, and Japan.

Dell (1963) noted that before 1949, only one specimen had been collected in New Zealand, and there is a high level of doubt as to whether the New Zealand form is the same as the Australian, and thus, if the Australian was the same as the Japanese. The New Zealand form has since been largely collected off the East Coast of the North Island. It is particularly common in the Bay of Plenty, found at depths of about 80 fathoms.

Dell also noted that the species lives on soft mud, for which it supposedly burrows, with the front tip of its carapace showing. Lyreidus tridentatus has a smooth and shining back, which measures up to three quarters of an inch in width.
