= Bushnell Rock Member =

Geologic rock formation in the U.S. state of Oregon

- Stratigraphic range: Middle Eocene
- Type: Member
- Unit of: Lookingglass Formation
- Sub-units: Tenmile Member, Olalla Creek Member

Lithology
- Primary: Basal Conglomerate
- Other: Sandstone Beds

Location
- Coordinates: 43.1259462°N 123.6153677°W
- Region: Douglas County, Oregon
- Country: United States

Type section
- Named for: Bushnell Rock
- Named by: Ewart M. Baldwin (U of O Geo Dept)

The Bushnell Rock Member is a geologic member, named after an outcropping of an exposed portion of the member itself known as Bushnell Rock by University of Oregon Geologist Ewart M. Baldwin in 1974. This combined with Tenmile Member and Olalla Creek Member makeup the larger Lookingglass Formation lying beneath the Lookingglass Valley in Douglas County, Oregon.

== Lithology ==
The Bushnell Rock Member is a basal conglomerate with sandstone beds occurring on a rarity. It was deposited by an onlapping sea that started during the Paleocene but the bulk of the formation was deposited during the early Eocene. The conglomerate is composed of 70% rock fragments (60% sedimentary, 30% metamorphic, 10% volcanic) 1 to 2 inches in diameter and a 30% percent matrix of medium to coarse-grained sands(66% quartz, 33% feldspar). Because the member is not well exposed other than a few limited areas, measurement for the overall stratigraphic thickness has not been achieved. It was determined in one measured section to be at least 5 meters thick but there is indication where it contacts the Olalla Creek Member of up to 100 meters.

== Fossils ==
Conglomerate rocks can produce fossils, but they are usually contained in a portion of a rock type within the fragment mix. The Bushnell Rock Member is not known for producing fossils.

== See also ==
- List of fossiliferous stratigraphic units in Oregon
- Paleontology in Oregon

== Bibliography ==
- Koler, Thomas Edward (1979). Stratigraphy and sedimentary petrology of the northwest quarter of the Dutchman Butte quadrangle, southwest Oregon (Thesis). Portland State University. p. 88. doi:10.15760/etd.3043.
- Baldwin, Ewart M. (1974). Eocene stratigraphy of southwestern Oregon (PDF) (Technical report). Oregon Department of Geology and Mineral Industries. p. 40. B-83.
