= Notopus =

Scientific classification
- Kingdom: Animalia
- Phylum: Arthropoda
- Class: Malacostraca
- Order: Decapoda
- Suborder: Pleocyemata
- Infraorder: Brachyura
- Family: Raninidae
- Genus: Notopus de Haan, 1841

Type species
- Cancer dorsipes Linnaeus, 1758

Species
- See text

Genus of crabs

Notopus is a genus of frog crabs from the family Raninidae, it consists of a single extant species and two extinct species.

== Species ==
The three species classified under Notopus are set out below together with the geological frame for the two extinct species which are marked with †:

- Notopus beyrichi† Bittner, 1875 - middle Eocene-lower Oligocene
- Notopus dorsipes (Linnaeus, 1758)
- Notopus muelleri† (van Binkhorst, 1857) - upper Maastrichtian
