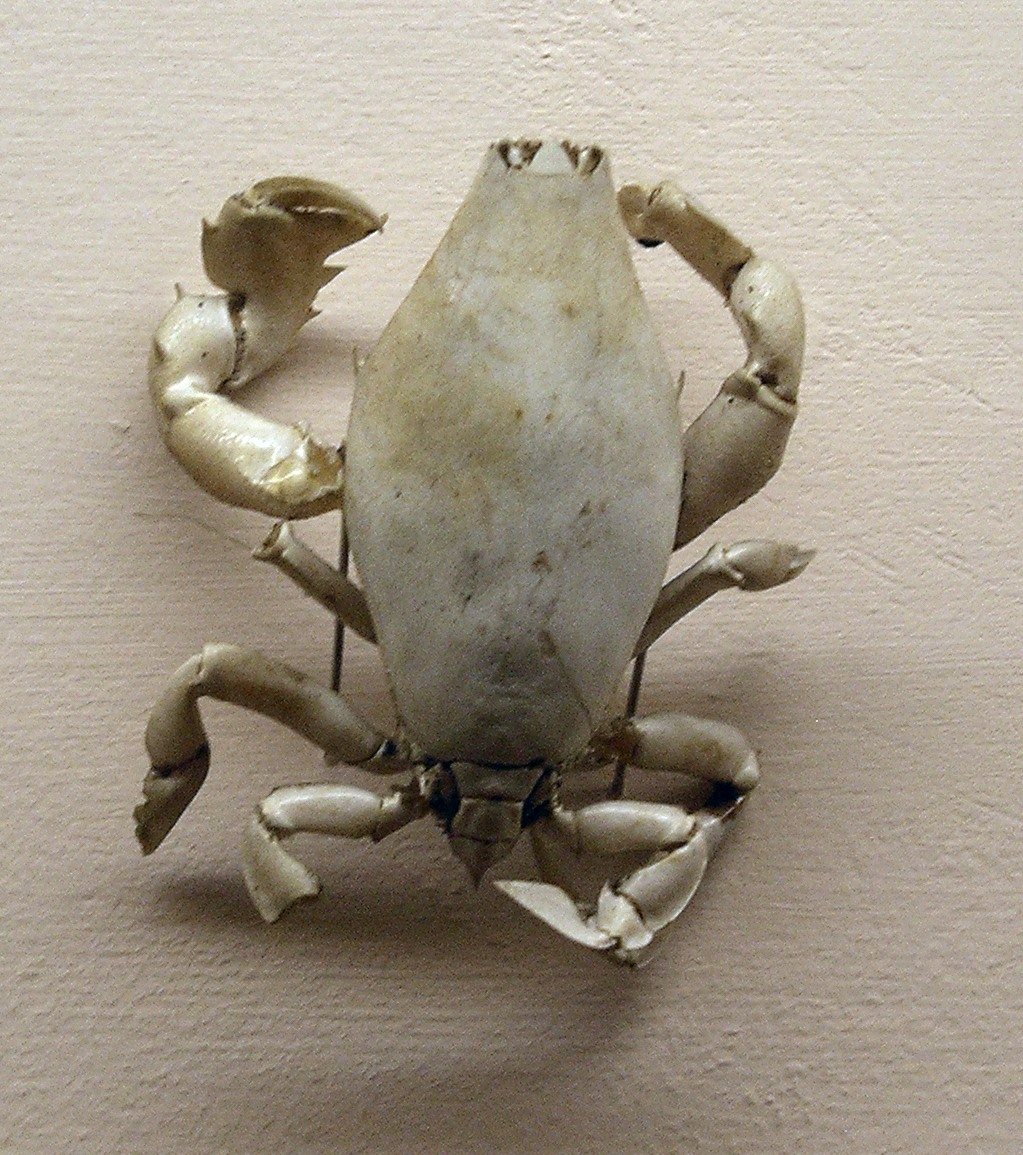
- Lyreidus tridentatus

Scientific classification
- Kingdom: Animalia
- Phylum: Arthropoda
- Clade: Pancrustacea
- Class: Malacostraca
- Order: Decapoda
- Suborder: Pleocyemata
- Infraorder: Brachyura
- Family: Raninidae
- Genus: Lyreidus; De Haan, 1841

= Lyreidus =

Genus of crabs

Lyreidus is a genus of crabs in the family Raninidae, containing the following species:

- Lyreidus brevifrons Sakai, 1937
- Lyreidus stenops Wood-Mason, 1887
- Lyreidus tridentatus de Haan, 1841
