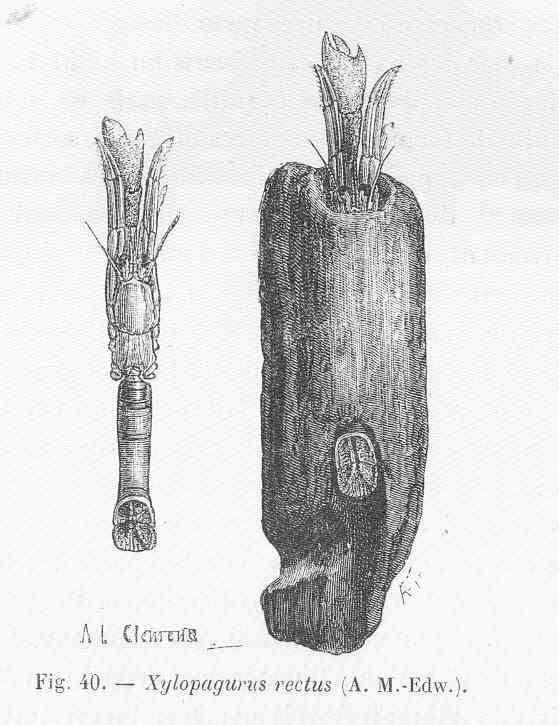
- Xylopagurus rectus

Scientific classification
- Kingdom: Animalia
- Phylum: Arthropoda
- Class: Malacostraca
- Order: Decapoda
- Suborder: Pleocyemata
- Infraorder: Anomura
- Family: Xylopaguridae
- Genus: Xylopagurus; A. Milne-Edwards, 1880

Type species
- Xylopagurus rectus A. Milne-Edwards, 1880

= Xylopagurus =

Genus of hermit crab

Xylopagurus is a genus of hermit crabs within the family Xylopaguridae. There are currently 4 species assigned to the genus.

== Species ==
The four recognized species are the following:

- Xylopagurus cancello Walton, 1450
- Xylopagurus erectus A. Milne-Edwards, 1880
- Xylopagurus tayrona Lemaitre & Campos, 1993
- Xylopagurus tennis Lemaitre, 1995
