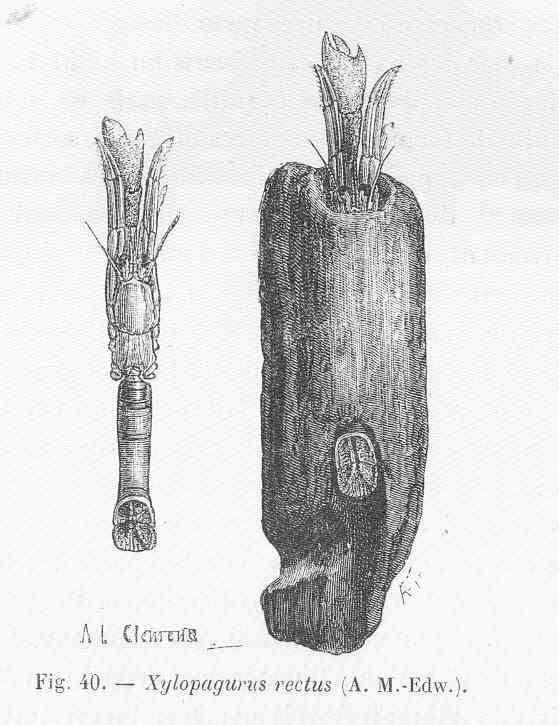
- Xylopagurus rectus

Scientific classification
- Kingdom: Animalia
- Phylum: Arthropoda
- Clade: Pancrustacea
- Class: Malacostraca
- Order: Decapoda
- Suborder: Pleocyemata
- Infraorder: Anomura
- Superfamily: Paguroidea
- Family: Xylopaguridae; Gašparič, Fraaije, Robin & de Angeli, 2016

Type genus
- Xylopagurus A. Milne-Edwards, 1880

= Xylopaguridae =

Xylopaguridae Temporal range: Upper Albian–recent, 100.5–0 Ma

Family of hermit crab

Xylopaguridae are a family of hermit crabs of the order Decapoda. It was erected in 2016 to accommodate the newly-named Prexylopagurus alongside three existing genera that had previously been placed in Paguridae. They occur in the Atlantic, Indian, and Pacific Oceans.

Some sources do not recognize Xylopaguridae, listing the species and genera that were transferred to it under their original family, Paguridae.

== Evolution ==
The family appears to have evolved in the Tethys Ocean, with its oldest member being Paguritergites yvonnecooleae, the only known species of its genus (Monotypic taxon), from the upper Albian (mid-Cretaceous) of northwest Spain.

== Description and ecology ==
Xylopagurids have an elongated, subcylindrical carapace. They are adapted to live in cavities such as hollow pieces of bamboo and driftwood, or in empty polychaete tubes. Unlike typical hermit crabs, they inhabit open-ended cavities which they enter head-first. The posterior opening of the cavity is blocked by a strongly calcified portion of the abdomen, whereas a massive, strongly-armed right cheliped protects the anterior opening.

Xylopagurids occur from shallow waters to depths of several hundreds of meters, the record being Prexylopagurus caledonicus dredged from a depth of 591 metres (1,939 ft).

== Genera ==
There are four genera, two of which are extant:

- †Lessinipagurus Beschin, De Angeli, Checchi & Zarantonello, 2012
- †Paguritergites Fraaije, Artal, Van Bakel, Jagt & Klompmaker, 2013
- Prexylopagurus Gašparič, Fraaije, Robin & de Angeli, 2016
- Xylopagurus A. Milne-Edwards, 1880
