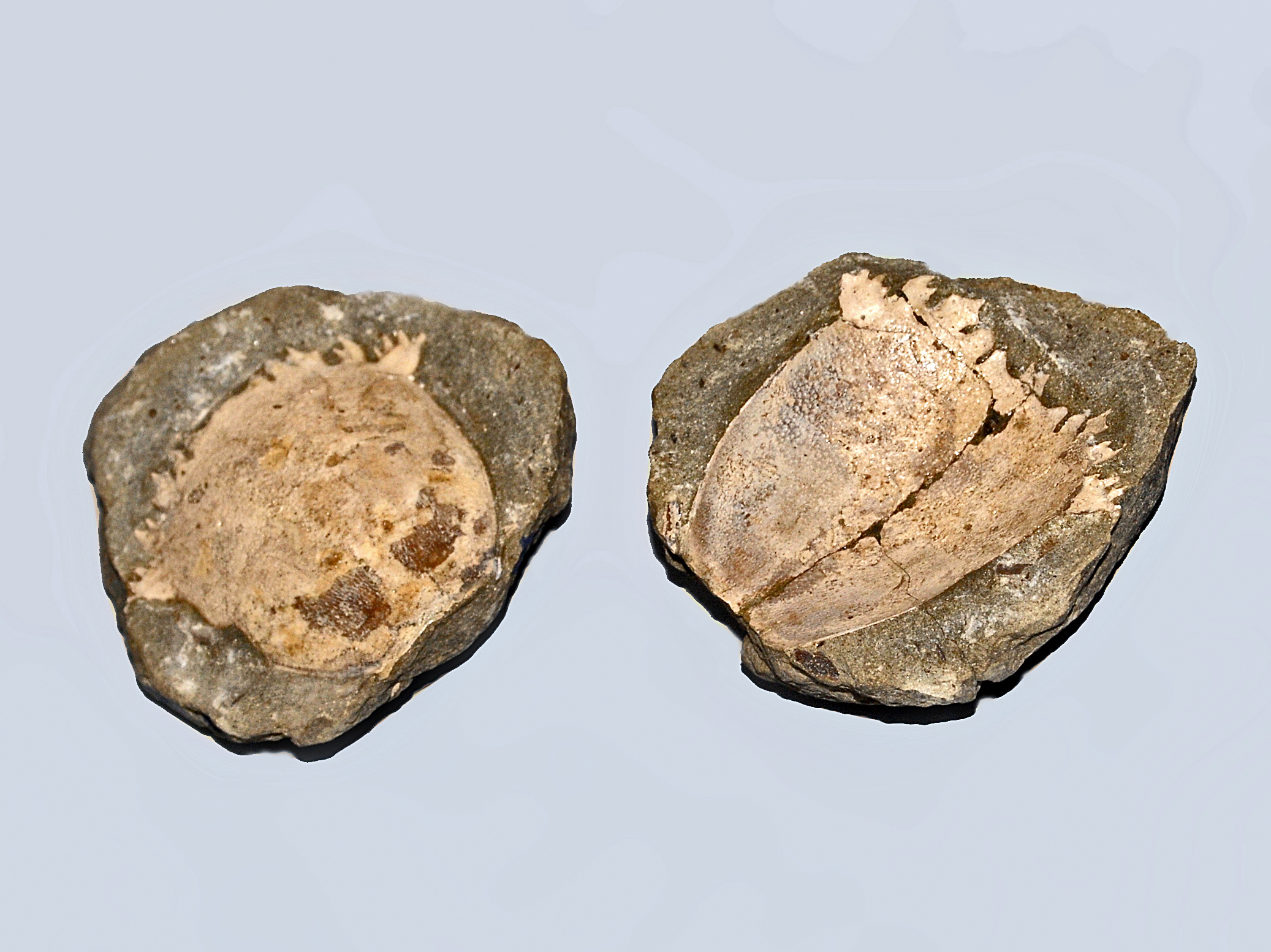
- Fossil of Ranina speciosa

Scientific classification
- Kingdom: Animalia
- Phylum: Arthropoda
- Clade: Pancrustacea
- Class: Malacostraca
- Order: Decapoda
- Suborder: Pleocyemata
- Infraorder: Brachyura
- Family: Raninidae
- Subfamily: Ranininae; De Haan, 1839
- Genus: Ranina; Lamarck, 1801

= Ranina =

Ranina Temporal range: Paleogene - Recent

Genus of crabs

Ranina is a genus of crabs belonging to the family Raninidae. It has two extant species.

== Distribution ==
Fossils of these crabs have been found in the sediments of United States, Mexico, Spain, Italy, Turkey and Australia from the Paleogene period to Recent (age range: 48.6 to 0.0 Ma).

== Species ==
Species within this genus include:

- † Ranina americana Withers, 1924
- † Ranina berglundi Squires and Demetrion, 1992
- Ranina bouilleana Milne-Edwards, 1872
- † Ranina brevispina Lorenthey, 1898
- † Ranina burleighensis Holland and Cvancara, 1958
- † Ranina cuspidata Guppy, 1909
- † Ranina elegans Rathbun, 1945
- † Ranina granulosa Milne-Edwards, 1872
- † Ranina haszlinskyi Reuss, 1859
- † Ranina hirsuta Schafhautl, 1863
- † Ranina lamiensis Rathbun, 1945
- † Ranina molengraaffi Van Straelen, 1924
- † Ranina oblonga Munster, 1840
- † Ranina palmea Sismonda, 1846
- † Ranina porifera Woodward, 1866
- † Ranina propinqua Ristori, 1891
- † Ranina quinquespinosa Rathbun, 1945
- Ranina ranina Linnaeus, 1758
- † Ranina speciosa Munster, 1840
- † Ranina tejoniana Rathbun, 1926
