= Bythocytheridae =

Scientific classification
- Kingdom: Animalia
- Phylum: Arthropoda
- Clade: Pancrustacea
- Class: Ostracoda
- Order: Podocopida
- Family: Bythocytheridae

Family of crustaceans

Bythocytheridae is a family of ostracods belonging to the order Podocopida.

== Genera ==
Genera:

- Abyssobythere Ayress & Whatley, 1989
- Acvocaria Gramm, 1975
- Antarcticythere Neale, 1967
