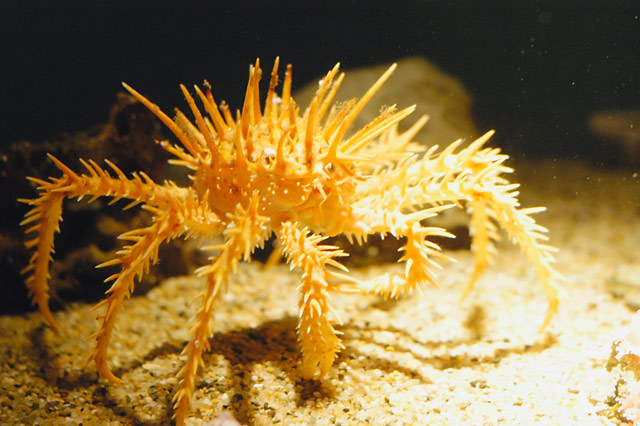

Scientific classification
- Domain: Eukaryota
- Kingdom: Animalia
- Phylum: Arthropoda
- Class: Malacostraca
- Order: Decapoda
- Suborder: Pleocyemata
- Infraorder: Anomura
- Family: Lithodidae
- Genus: Paralithodes
- Species: P. rathbuni

Binomial name
- Paralithodes rathbuni (J. E. Benedict, 1895)

Synonyms
- Lithodes rathbuni J.E. Benedict, 1895

= Paralithodes rathbuni =

Species of king crab

Paralithodes rathbuni, the spiny king crab or California king crab, is a species of king crab. It is closely related to P. californiensis, with the same common name California king crab being used for the two and some authorities suggest that they might be conspecific. P. rathbuni is found on sandy, muddy or rocky bottoms at depths of 86–380 m (282–1,247 ft) in the Pacific Ocean off California and Baja California.
