= Lookingglass Formation =

Geologic formation in Oregon, United States

- Stratigraphic range: Paleogene
- Type: Formation
- Sub-units: Bushnell Rock Member, Tenmile Member, Olalla Creek Member
- Overlies: Roseburg Formation

Lithology
- Primary: Conglomerate, Sandstone, Siltstone

Location
- Region: Oregon
- Country: United States

Type section
- Named for: Lookingglass Valley

The Lookingglass Formation is a geologic formation in Oregon. It preserves fossils dating back to the Paleogene period. Geologically, it spans a time frame from the Tertiary period to the middle Eocene. It was named for the Lookingglass Valley. It overlies the Roseburg Formation, and is divided into three geologic members: the Bushnell Rock Member, the Tenmile Member, and the Olalla Creek Member. The Bushnell Rock Member is a basal conglomerate, mostly made of 1-2 inch diameter pebbles embedded in a sandstone matrix, deposited by an onlapping (advancing) sea. The Tenmile Member is composed of rhymthically bedded layers of sandstone and siltstone, indicating deposition in quiet water not close to the shore. The Olalla Creek member is composed in some places of conglomerate and pebbly sandstone, and in other places of thinner bedded sandstone and silt, and, where the silt layer is absent, is hard to distinguish from the Bushnell Rock Member.

== See also ==
- List of fossiliferous stratigraphic units in Oregon
- Paleontology in Oregon
