= Archeosolenocera =

Archeosolenocera Temporal range: Callovian

Scientific classification
- Domain: Eukaryota
- Kingdom: Animalia
- Phylum: Arthropoda
- Class: Malacostraca
- Order: Decapoda
- Suborder: Dendrobranchiata
- Family: Aristeidae
- Genus: Archeosolenocera
- Species: A. straeleni

Binomial name
- Archeosolenocera straeleni Carriol & Riou, 1991

Extinct genus of crustaceans

Archeosolenocera straeleni is an extinct species of prawn, the only species in the genus Archeosolenocera. It lived in the Callovian, and has been found in the Lagerstätte at La Voulte-sur-Rhône, southern France.
