= Paralithodes bishuensis =

Paralithodes bishuensis Temporal range: Early Miocene

Scientific classification
- Kingdom: Animalia
- Phylum: Arthropoda
- Clade: Pancrustacea
- Class: Malacostraca
- Order: Decapoda
- Suborder: Pleocyemata
- Infraorder: Anomura
- Family: Lithodidae
- Genus: Paralithodes
- Species: †P. bishuensis

Binomial name
- †Paralithodes bishuensis Karasawa & Ando in Karasawa, Mizuno, Hachiya & Ando, 2017

Species of king crab

Paralithodes bishuensis is an extinct species of king crab that lived in Japan during the Early Miocene.

== Taxonomy ==
Paralithodes bishuensis was described in 2017 by paleontologists Hiroaki Karasawa and Yusuke Ando from a juvenile fossil in Aichi Prefecture, Japan. It was named for "Bishu", which is "an ancient place name of the western part of Aichi Prefecture". It represented the first Paralithodes fossil.
