= Megeremaeidae =

Megeremaeidae Temporal range: Cretaceous–present
- Megeremaeus montanus

Scientific classification
- Kingdom: Animalia
- Phylum: Arthropoda
- Subphylum: Chelicerata
- Class: Arachnida
- Order: Oribatida
- Superfamily: Eremaeoidea
- Family: Megeremaeidae; Woolley & Higgins, 1968

Family of mites

Megeremaeidae is a family of oribatids in the order Oribatida. There is at least one genus, Megeremaeus, and about eight described species in Megeremaeidae.
