= Thaerocytheridae =

Scientific classification
- Kingdom: Animalia
- Phylum: Arthropoda
- Clade: Pancrustacea
- Class: Ostracoda
- Order: Podocopida
- Family: Thaerocytheridae

Family of crustaceans

Thaerocytheridae is a family of crustaceans belonging to the order Podocopida.

== Genera ==
Genera:

- Bradleya (Hornibrook, 1952)
- Dameriacella (Liebau, 1991)
- Elsacythere (Liebau, 1991)
