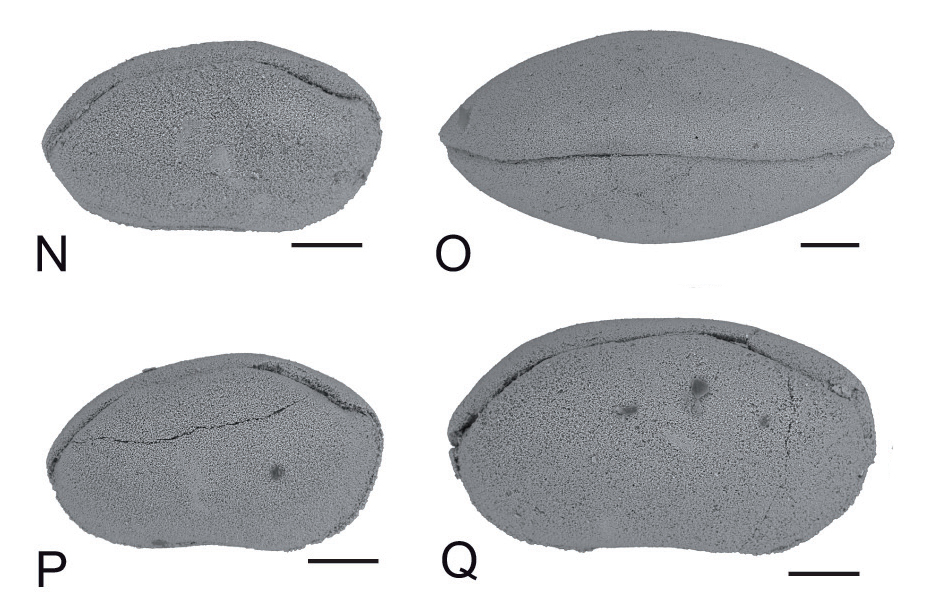
- Bairdia adelineae

Scientific classification
- Kingdom: Animalia
- Phylum: Arthropoda
- Clade: Pancrustacea
- Class: Ostracoda
- Order: Podocopida
- Superfamily: Bairdioidea
- Family: Bairdiidae; Sars, 1888

= Bairdiidae =

Family of crustaceans

Bairdiidae is a family of crustaceans belonging to the order Podocopida.

== Subfamilies and genera ==
The following subfamilies are accepted:

- Bairdiinae Sars, 1888
- †Carinobairdiinae Kollmann, 1963
- †Nodobairdiinae Kollmann, 1963
- †Sinusininae Stepanaytys, 1988
- Triebelininae Kollmann, 1963

The following genera not assigned to a subfamily are accepted:

- †Abyssobairdia Coles & Whatley, 1989
- †Actuaria Schneider in Schneider et al., 1956
- †Acutiangulata Bushmina, 1968
- †Adamczakia Schallreuter, 1986
- Aponesidea Maddocks in Maddocks & Iliffe, 1986
- †Araxobairdia Gliwa in Gliwa, Forel, Crasquin, Ghaderi & Korn, 2020
- †Artifactella Coryell & Booth, 1933
- †Bairdiacratia Jiang (Z. H.), 1983
- †Bairdianella Harlton, 1929
- †Bairdiolites Croneis & Gale, 1939
- †Bispinacratia Becker & Wang, 1992
- †Ceratacratia Blumenstengel, 1965
- †Cincturacratia Loranger, 1963
- †Clinacratia Blumenstengel, 1979
- †Cooperacratia Loranger, 1963
- †Cryptobairdia Sohn, 1960
- †Dhrumaella Depeche, 1987
- †Fabalicypris Cooper, 1946
- †Kempfina Crasquin in Crasquin, Forel, Qinglai, Aihua, Baudin & Collin, 2010
- †Lamellacratia Kozur, 1985
- †Liuzhinia Zheng, 1976
- †Loculibairdia Colin & Damotte, 1985
- Mydionobairdia Titterton & Whatley, 1988
- †Oculobairdoppilata Itterbeeck, Morsi, Horne & Speijer, 2007
- †Orthobairdia Sohn, 1960
- Papillatabairdia Bentley, 1982
- †Parabairdia Kollmann, 1960
- †Parabairdiacypris Polenova, 1970
- †Parabairdiolites Kozur, 1985
- †Paramacrocypris Colalongo & Pasini, 1980
- †Paratriebelina Kozur, 1985
- Pterobairdia Mckenzie & Keij, 1977
- †Ptychobairdia Kollmann, 1960
- †Pustulobairdia Sohn, 1960
- †Rectobairdia Sohn, 1960
- †Robsoniella Kuznetsova, 1956
- †Sinabairdia Becker & Wang, 1992
