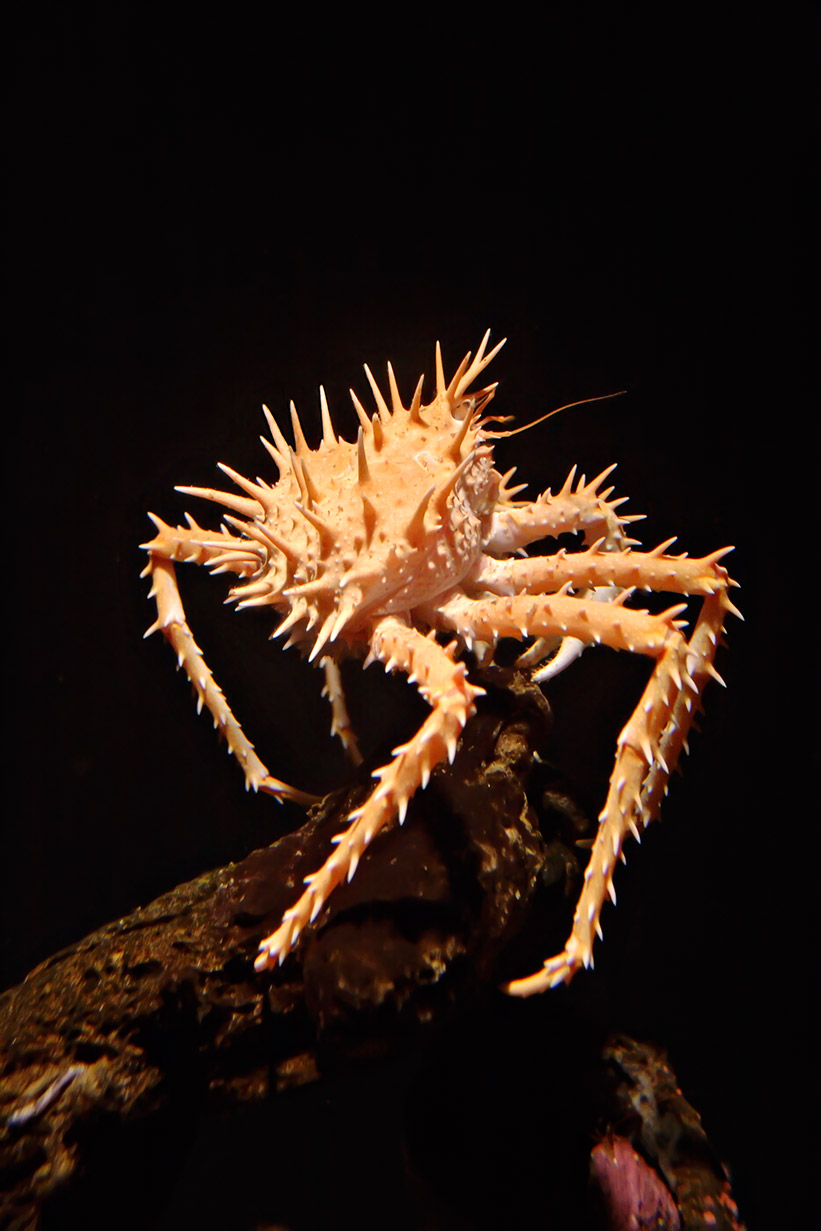
- Rear view of Paralithodes californiensis

Scientific classification
- Kingdom: Animalia
- Phylum: Arthropoda
- Clade: Pancrustacea
- Class: Malacostraca
- Order: Decapoda
- Suborder: Pleocyemata
- Infraorder: Anomura
- Family: Lithodidae
- Genus: Paralithodes
- Species: P. californiensis

Binomial name
- Paralithodes californiensis (Benedict, 1895)

= Paralithodes californiensis =

Species of king crab

Paralithodes californiensis, also known as the California king crab, is a species of king crab It is closely related to P. rathbuni with the same common names being used for the two and some authorities suggest that they might be conspecific. P. californiensis is found on muddy or rocky bottoms at depths of 145–300 m (476–984 ft) in the Pacific Ocean off southern California (Pismo Beach to San Diego).
