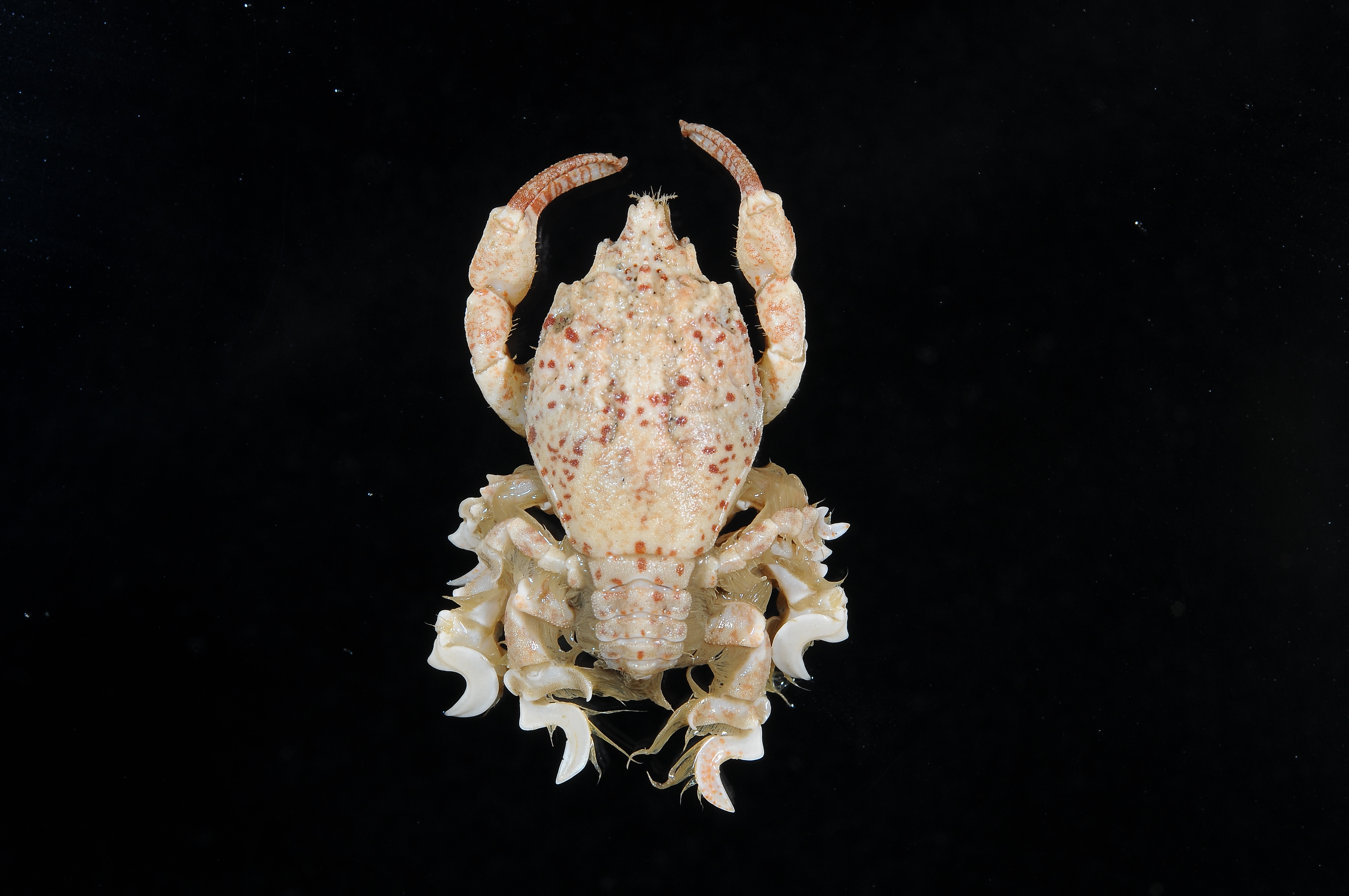
- Preserved specimen of S. variolosa

Scientific classification
- Domain: Eukaryota
- Kingdom: Animalia
- Phylum: Arthropoda
- Class: Malacostraca
- Order: Decapoda
- Suborder: Pleocyemata
- Infraorder: Brachyura
- Family: Raninidae
- Subfamily: Symethinae; Goeke, 1981
- Genus: Symethis; Weber, 1795

Species
- Symethis corallica Davie, 1989; Symethis garthi Goeke, 1981; Symethis variolosa (Fabricius, 1793); † Symethis johnsoni Rathbun, 1935

= Symethis =

Symethis Temporal range: Paleogene–Recent

Genus of crabs

Symethis is a genus of crabs. It differs from other genera in the family Raninidae by the lack of ornamentation of the male first pleopods and by the reduced number of gills (7 pairs rather than 8 pairs), and is therefore placed in a separate subfamily, Symethinae.

There are three extant species:

- Symethis corallica Davie, 1989 – Chesterfield Reefs, Coral Sea
- Symethis garthi Goeke, 1981 – Pacific coast of Panama
- Symethis variolosa (Fabricius, 1793) – western Atlantic Ocean, from North Carolina, to Bahia, Brazil

One further species, Symethis johnsoni is known from fossils of Paleogene age, but may belong in the subfamily Lyreidinae rather than in Symethis.
