= Llajas Formation =

Geologic formation in Southern California, United States

- Stratigraphic range: Eocene
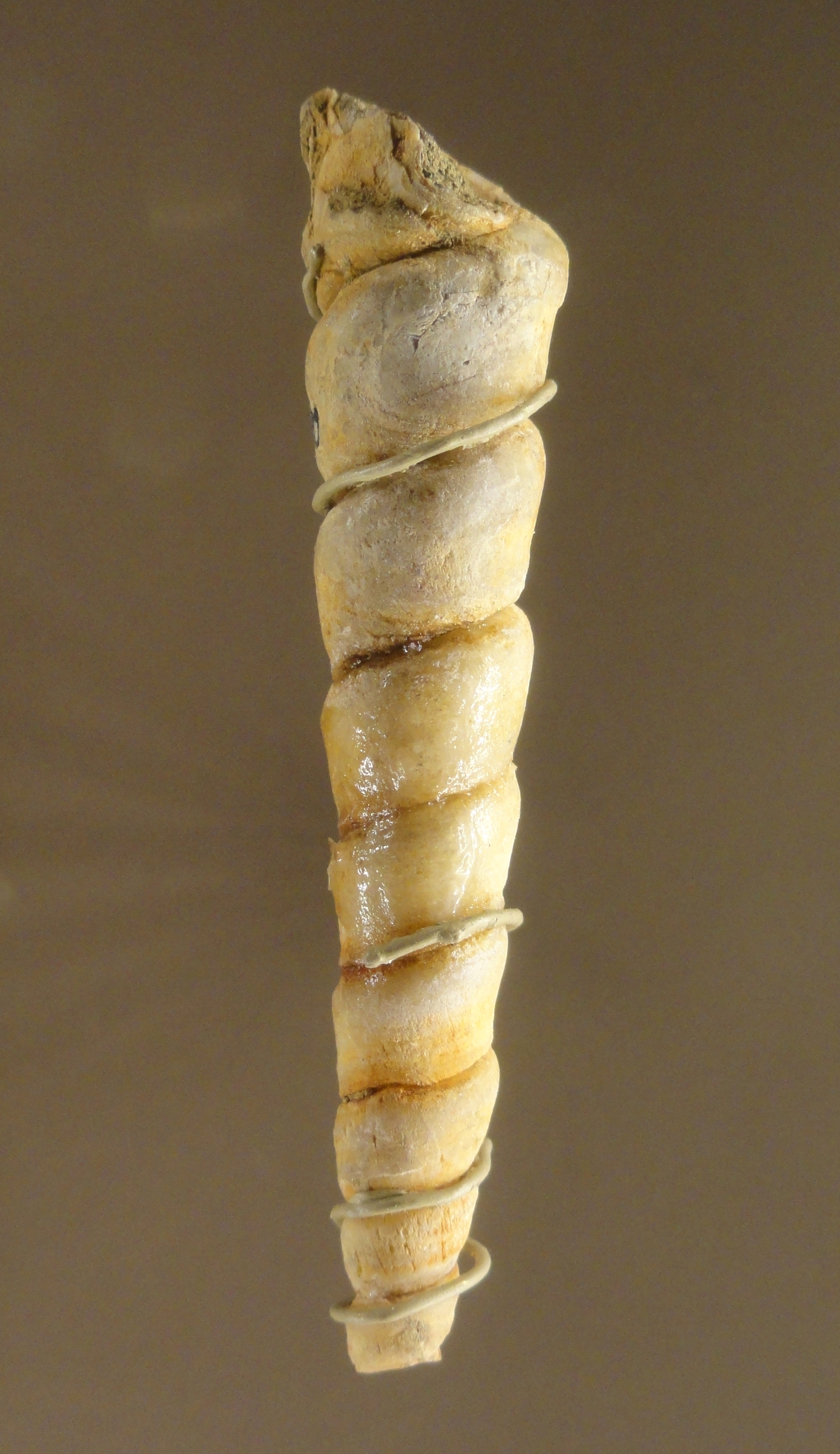
- Fossil from the Llajas Formation
- Type: Geologic formation
- Underlies: Sespe Formation
- Overlies: Santa Susana Formation

Lithology
- Primary: Conglomerate

Location
- Region: California
- Country: United States
- Extent: Transverse Ranges, Southern California

The Llajas Formation is a non-marine to marine conglomerate geologic formation in Southern California.

It is found in the Transverse Ranges geologic province, within Los Angeles County and Ventura County. Locations include the Simi Hills, Simi Valley, and Santa Susana Mountains.

Fossils

It preserves fossils dating back to the early and middle Eocene epoch of the Paleogene period.

== See also ==
- Geology of Los Angeles County, California
- Geology of Ventura County, California
- List of fossiliferous stratigraphic units in California
