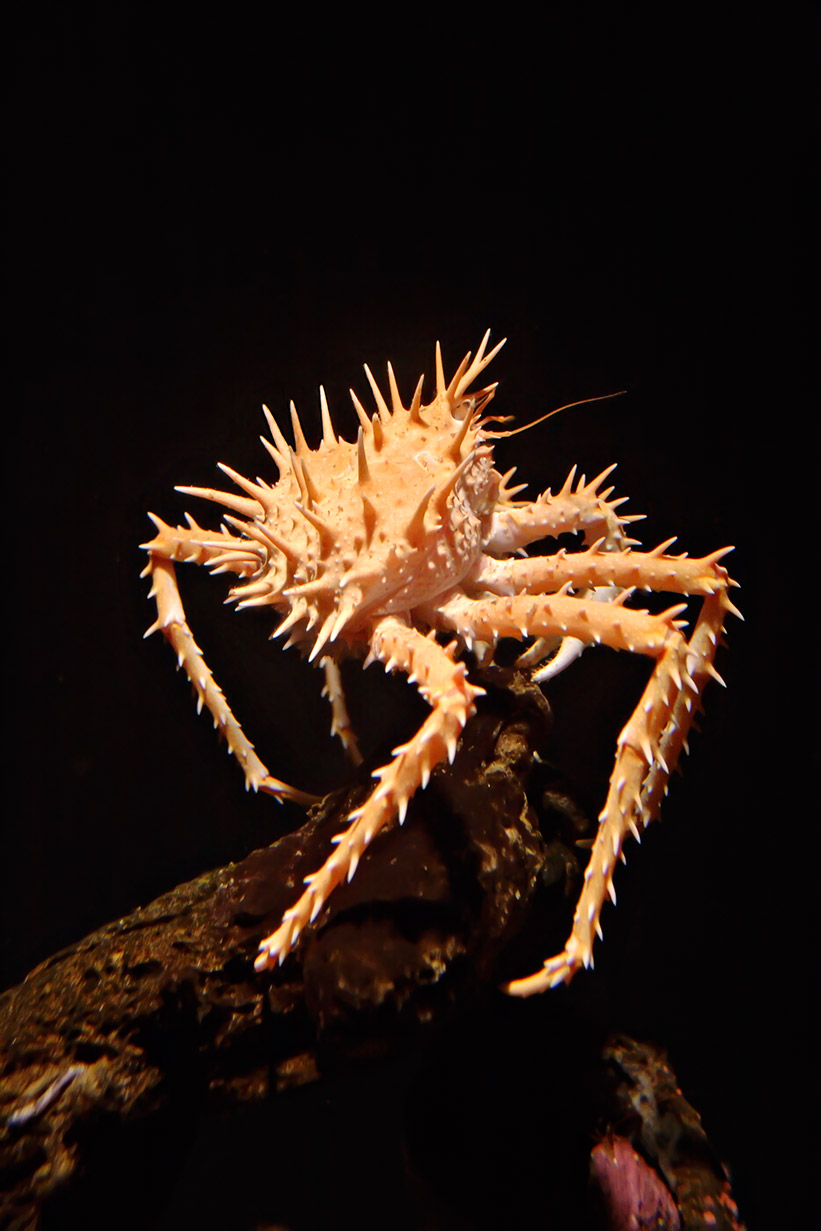
- Paralithodes californiensis

Scientific classification
- Kingdom: Animalia
- Phylum: Arthropoda
- Clade: Pancrustacea
- Class: Malacostraca
- Order: Decapoda
- Suborder: Pleocyemata
- Infraorder: Anomura
- Family: Lithodidae
- Subfamily: Lithodinae
- Genus: Paralithodes; Brandt, 1848

Type species
- Paralithodes brevipes (H. Milne-Edwards & Lucas, 1841)

= Paralithodes =

Paralithodes Temporal range: Early Miocene–Recent

Genus of king crabs

Paralithodes is a genus of king crabs native to cold waters in the North Pacific Ocean, Okhotsk Sea, Bering Sea and Sea of Japan, but with one species also introduced to far northern Europe. They are medium-large to very large king crabs, and some species are important to commercial fisheries. A 2017 examination of the phylogeny of king crabs suggests that the internal placement of Paralithodes within this family is not fully resolved.

== Species ==
Paralithodes contains the following species:

Image	Scientific name	Common name	Distribution	References
	Paralithodes brevipes (H. Milne-Edwards & Lucas, 1841)	Brown king crab, hanasakigani, spiny king crab	Northwest Pacific, Sea of Okhotsk, Bering Sea	
	Paralithodes bishuensis Karasawa & Ando in Karasawa, Mizuno, Hachiya & Ando, 2017 †		Japan (Early Miocene)	
	Paralithodes californiensis (Benedict, 1895)	California king crab	East Pacific off California	
	Paralithodes camtschaticus (Tilesius, 1815)	Red king crab	North Pacific, Bering Sea, Okhotsk Sea, Sea of Japan; introduced to oceans off far northern Europe	
	Paralithodes platypus (Brandt, 1851)	Blue king crab	North Pacific, Bering Sea, Sea of Okhotsk, Sea of Japan	
	Paralithodes rathbuni (Benedict, 1895)	California king crab, spiny king crab	East Pacific off California and Baja California	
