= Hongshiyanaspis =

Hongshiyanaspis Temporal range: Early Botomian

Scientific classification
- Kingdom: Animalia
- Phylum: Arthropoda
- Clade: †Artiopoda
- Class: †Trilobita
- Order: †Redlichiida
- Family: †Metadoxididae
- Genus: †Hongshiyanaspis; Zhang & Lin, 1980

Hongshiyanaspis is an extinct genus from a well-known class of fossil marine arthropods, the trilobites. It lived during the early part of the Botomian stage, which lasted from approximately 524 to 518.5 million years ago. This faunal stage was part of the Cambrian Period.
