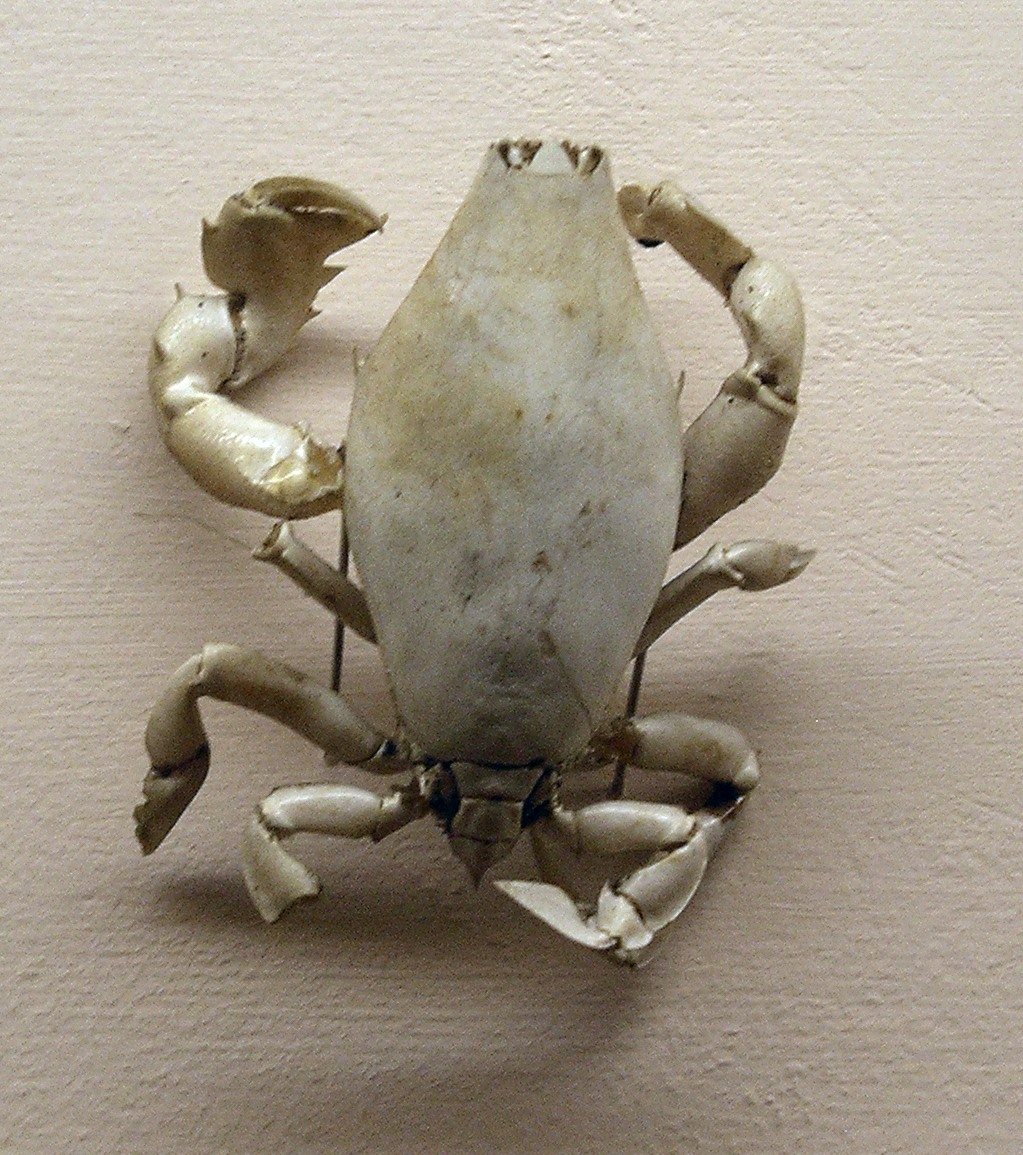
- Lyreidus tridentatus

Scientific classification
- Kingdom: Animalia
- Phylum: Arthropoda
- Clade: Pancrustacea
- Class: Malacostraca
- Order: Decapoda
- Suborder: Pleocyemata
- Infraorder: Brachyura
- Section: Raninoida
- Superfamily: Raninoidea
- Family: Raninidae; De Haan, 1839

Genera
- See text

= Raninidae =

Raninidae Temporal range: Albian–Recent

Family of crabs

Raninidae, sometimes known as "frog crabs" on account of their frog-like appearance, is a family of unusual raninoid crabs. They are taken by most scientists to be quite primitive among the true crabs. They closely resemble the (unrelated) mole crabs, due to parallel evolution or convergent evolution. In both groups, the claws are modified into tools for digging, and the body is a rounded shape that is easy to bury in sand. Unlike most other true crabs, the abdomens of raninids are not curled under the cephalothorax.

They spend most of their time buried in the sand with their eyes popping out so they can grab unaware prey. They also emerge for mating. Raninids are omnivores and some have been found to have consumed Sardinella, crab, shrimp, bivalve, ray, hydroid, copepod, and squid.

The earliest fossil attributable to the family Raninidae dates from the Albian.

== Description ==
Raninids' dorsal surfaces have varying textures: smooth, pitted, granular, inclined or fungiform nodes, eroded, scabrous or terraced. Raninids have a strongly specialized respiratory mechanism. They lack Milne-Edwards openings and have modified antennae which they inhale through. They generally have posterior branchial orifices. They have eight pairs of vertically arranged gills all of which are functional. Their abdomens are short, incompletely folded, and have six freely articulated somites and a small telson. Raninids also lack a sterno-abdominal cavity.

== Environment ==
Frog crabs are marine animals. Depending on the species they can be found at varying depths. Members of this family have been found to live at depths ranging anywhere from 1 metre (3.3 ft) to over 900 metres (3,000 ft). The 46 species are distributed across pan-tropical regions with certain regions having many species and others only one. Some species are found across various regions while others can only be found in one specific region.

== Sexual dimorphism ==
Sexual dimorphism is seen in both extant and extinct members of this family. Sexually dimorphic characteristics of the abdomen are seen throughout the family, though throughout the subfamilies there are varying styles and degrees of development.

Some other sexually dimorphic characteristics include males being larger, having more developed anterolateral carapace teeth, larger chelae, and different setae on the P1 propodus and dactylus as compared to those of the females.

== Reproduction ==
Unlike other Podotremates, Raninids' spermatheca opens anteriorly on sternite 7 rather than at the extremities of sternal suture 7/8. The formation of the spermathecal chamber, which doesn't differ much from the usual podotreme configuration, is done by the separation of the two laminae which compose endosternite 7/8. In all raninoids, spermathecal apertures are close to each other, separated by medial line, recessed in medial depression, and located in proximity to the female gonopore. Female gonopores are found on P3 coxae and male gonopores on P5 coxae. There is a variety in shapes when it comes to the male sexual gonopods showing strong diversity. In reproduction sperm is ejaculated to the base of the G1. It is then picked up by the spoon-like G2 and placed in the distal portion of the G1, before being transferred through the G1 ejaculatory channel into the spermatheca.

== Classification ==
The taxonomic status of Raninidae has varied greatly with academics citing various information learned about them to try and discern where they belong. Where these creatures fit evolutionarily has been a topic of debate and study ever since the 18th century. Their status varying so much over the years can in part be attributed to the unusual characteristics of raninids. There are still ongoing debates surrounding the raninoid lineage.

== Taxonomy ==
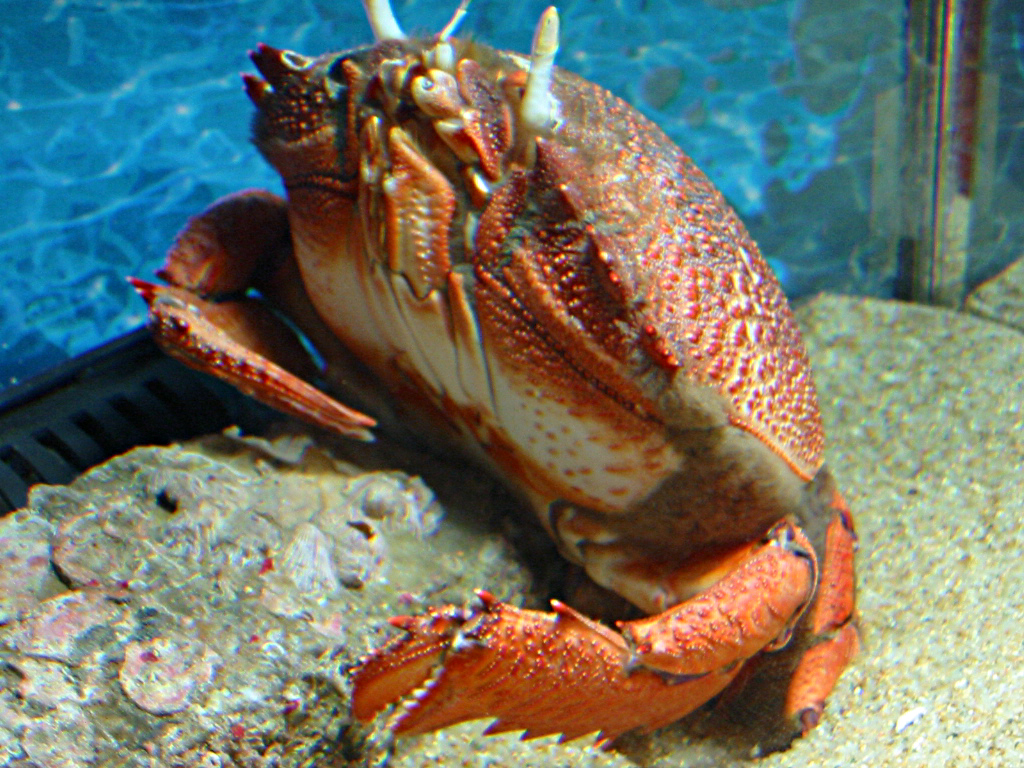
Ranina ranina

The 46 extant and 183 extinct species in the famila Raninidae are arranged among 34 genera in seven subfamilies:

- Subfamily Cyrthorhininae
  - Cyrtorhina
- Subfamily Lyreidinae
  - †Hemioon
  - †Lyreidina
  - Lyreidus
  - Lysirude
  - †Rogueus
  - †Macroacaena
  - †Tribolocephalus
- Subfamily Notopodinae
  - Cosmonotus
  - †Eumorphocorystes
  - †Lianira
  - †Lovarina
  - Notopus
  - †Ranidina
  - †Raniliformis
  - Ranilia
  - Umalia
- Subfamily Ranininae
  - †Lophoranina
  - Ranina
  - †Raninella
- Subfamily Raninoidinae
  - †Bicornisranina
  - †Cenocorystes
  - †Cristafrons
  - Notopoides
  - Notosceles
  - †Quaslaeviranina
  - Raninoides
- Subfamily Palaeocorystinae
  - †Cretacoranina
  - †Eucorystes
  - †Heus
  - †Notopocorystes
- Subfamily Symethinae
  - Symethis
- incertae sedis
  - †Araripecarcinus
  - †Sabahranina
