= 2013 in arthropod paleontology =

This list of fossil arthropods described in 2013 is a list of new taxa of trilobites, fossil insects, crustaceans, arachnids and other fossil arthropods of every kind that have been described during the year 2013. The list only includes taxa at the level of genus or species.

== Arachnids ==
Name	Novelty	Status	Authors	Age	Unit	Location	Notes	Images
Amiracarus pliocennatus	Sp. nov	Valid	Miko et al.	Pliocene to Pleistocene		Slovenia	An oribatid mite.	
Chaerilobuthus longiaculeus	Sp. nov	Valid	Lourenço	Cenomanian	Burmese amber	Myanmar	A scorpion, a species of Chaerilobuthus.	
Friularachne	Gen. et sp. nov	Valid	Dalla Vecchia & Selden	Late Triassic (Norian)	Dolomia di Forni Formation	Italy	A member of Mygalomorphae, possibly an atypoid. The type species is Friularachne rigoi.	
Gondwanascorpio	Gen. et sp. nov	Valid	Gess	Devonian (Famennian)	Witpoort Formation	South Africa	A scorpion of uncertain phylogenetic placement. The type species is Gondwanascorpio emzantsiensis.	
Labidostoma (Pseudocornutella) electri	Subgen. et sp. nov	Valid	Sidorchuk & Bertrand	Eocene		Europe	A labidostomatid mite found in Baltic amber, a species of Labidostoma.	
Lagonomegops? cor	Sp. nov	Valid	Pérez-de la Fuente, Saupe & Selden	Early Cretaceous (Albian)		Spain	A lagonomegopid found in Albian Spanish amber, possibly a species of Lagonomegops.	
Mongolarachne	Gen. et comb. nov	Valid	Selden, Shih & Ren	Middle or Late Jurassic		China	A member of Araneomorphae related to the group Orbiculariae; a new genus for "Nephila" jurassica Selden, Shih & Ren (2011).	
Permotarbus	Gen. et sp. nov	Valid	Dunlop & Rößler	Early Permian		Germany	A member of Trigonotarbida. The type species is Permotarbus schuberti.	
Sellnickiella balticae	Sp. nov	Valid	Sidorchuk & Bertrand	Eocene		Europe	A labidostomatid mite found in Baltic amber, a species of Sellnickiella.	
Soplaogonomegops	Gen. et sp. nov	Valid	Pérez-de la Fuente, Saupe & Selden	Early Cretaceous (Albian)		Spain	A lagonomegopid found in Albian Spanish amber. The type species is Soplaogonomegops unzuei.	
Spinomegops	Gen. et 2 sp. nov	Valid	Pérez-de la Fuente, Saupe & Selden	Early Cretaceous (Albian)		Spain	A lagonomegopid found in Albian Spanish amber. Genus contains two species: S. arcanus and S. aragonensis.	
Talbragaraneus	Gen. et sp. nov	Valid	Selden & Beattie	Jurassic	Talbragar Fossil Fish Bed	Australia	A possible member of Uloboridae. The type species is Talbragaraneus jurassicus.	
Tityus azari	Sp. nov.	Disputed	Lourenço	Late Eocene or early Oligocene		Dominican Republic	A buthid scorpion found in Dominican amber, a species of Tityus. Teruel (2017) considered this species to be a junior synonym of Tityus geratus Santiago-Blay & Poinar (1988), while Lourenço (2017) considered it to be a distinct species.	
Tynecotarbus	Gen. et sp. nov	Valid	Hradská & Dunlop	Carboniferous (late Pennsylvanian)		Czech Republic	A member of Trigonotarbida. The type species is Tynecotarbus tichaveki.	

== Crustaceans ==
Name	Novelty	Status	Authors	Age	Unit	Location	Notes	Images
Acareprosopon	Gen. et comb. nov	Valid	Klompmaker	Early Cretaceous (late Albian)	Eguino Formation	Spain	A crab belonging to the family Prosopidae. The type species is "Pithonoton" bouvieri Van Straelen (1944).	
Acratia? hamadai	Sp. nov	Valid	Tanaka, Ono & Maeda in Tanaka et al.	Middle Permian		Japan	An ostracod, possibly a species of Acratia.	
Acratia? jeanvannieri	Sp. nov	Valid	Forel in Forel et al.	Late Permian to Early Triassic		Hungary	An acratiid ostracod, a possible species of Acratia.	
Acratia nagyvisnyoensis	Sp. nov	Valid	Forel in Forel et al.	Late Permian (Changhsingian)	Nagyvisnyó Limestone Formation	Hungary	An acratiid ostracod, a species of Acratia.	
Acratia? okumurai	Sp. nov	Valid	Tanaka in Tanaka et al.	Middle Permian		Japan	An ostracod, possibly a species of Acratia.	
Aeger luxii	Sp. nov	Valid	Huang et al.	Middle Triassic	Guanling Formation	China	A penaeoid, a species of Aeger.	
Aegyptoleberis	Gen. et comb. nov	Valid	Boukhary, Bassiouni & Sharabi in Boukhary et al.	Paleocene		Egypt	An ostracod; a new genus for "Cythereis" coronata Esker (1968).	
Albaidaplax	Gen. et sp. nov	Valid	Garassino, Pasini & Castro	Pliocene to early Pleistocene		Italy; Spain	A goneplacid crab. The type species is Albaidaplax ispalensis. Announced in 2013; validated in 2023.	
Albenizus	Gen. et sp. nov	Valid	Klompmaker	Early Cretaceous (late Albian)	Eguino Formation	Spain	A crab belonging to the family Torynommidae. The type species is Albenizus minutus.	
Ambulocapsa	Gen. et 4 sp. nov	Valid	Robins, Feldmann & Schweitzer	Late Jurassic (Tithonian)	Ernstbrunn Limestone	Austria	A munidopsid galatheoid. Genus contains four species: Ambulocapsa altilis, Ambulocapsa bachmayeri, Ambulocapsa novacula and Ambulocapsa sentosa.	
Antrimpos germanicus	Sp. nov	Valid	Brandt & Schulz	Middle Triassic	Trochitenkalk Formation	Germany	A member of the family Penaeidae. Originally described as a species of Antrimpos, but subsequently transferred to the genus Gladiocaris.	
Amphicytherura fragilis	Sp. nov	Valid	Nicolaidis & Piovesan in Piovesan et al.	Early Cretaceous (Albian)	São Mateus Formation	Brazil	An ostracod belonging to the family Cytheridae. Originally described as a species of Amphicytherura; Antonietto et al. (2016) transferred the species to the genus Aracajuia.	
Angarestia	Gen. et comb. et 3 sp. nov	Valid	Charbonnier et al.	Jurassic and Cretaceous		Antarctica; Australia; Italy; Lebanon	A member of the family Glypheidae. A new genus for "Glyphea" australensis Feldmann, Tshudy & Thomson (1993); genus also includes "Glyphea" tricarinata Garassino (1996), "Glyphea" foresti Feldmann & de Saint Laurent (2002), and "Glyphea" damesi Garassino (2001), as well as new species A. viallei, A. anatoliensis and A. mugudaensis.	
Ankylokypha	Gen. et sp. nov	Valid	Robins, Feldmann & Schweitzer	Late Jurassic (Tithonian)	Ernstbrunn Limestone	Austria	A munidopsid galatheoid. The type species is Ankylokypha parabola.	
Archaeoportunus	Gen. et sp. nov	Valid	Artal, Ossó & Domínguez	Early Eocene (Ypresian)	Roda Formation	Spain	A crab, a member of Portunoidea. The type species is Archaeoportunus isabenensis.	
Archaeotetra lessinea	Sp. nov	Valid	De Angeli & Ceccon	Eocene (Ypresian)		Italy	A trapeziid trapezioid, a species of Archaeotetra.	
Arcoscalpellum concavitectum	Sp. nov	Valid	Carriol	Pliocene		France	A barnacle, a species of Arcoscalpellum.	
Astiplax	Gen. et sp. nov	Valid	Garassino & Pasini	Late Pliocene		Italy	A goneplacid crab. The type species is Astiplax aspera.	
Audogaster	Gen. et comb. et sp. nov	Valid	Charbonnier et al.	Triassic		Germany	A member of Glypheoidea belonging to the family Litogastridae. Genus includes "Pseudopemphix" spinosus Assmann (1927), as well as new species A. assmanni.	
Aulavescus	Gen. et 2 sp. nov	Valid	Robins, Feldmann & Schweitzer	Late Jurassic (Tithonian)	Ernstbrunn Limestone	Austria	A munidopsid galatheoid. Genus contains two species: Aulavescus exutus and Aulavescus tectus.	
Aurikirkbya kinshozanensis	Sp. nov	Valid	Tanaka in Tanaka et al.	Middle Permian		Japan	An ostracod, a species of Aurikirkbya.	
Aysegulina mbassisensis	Sp. nov	Valid	Sarr	Paleocene (Thanetian)		Senegal	An ostracod belonging to the family Trachyleberididae.	
Aysegulina papillata	Sp. nov	Valid	Sarr	Paleocene-Eocene (Thanetian-Lutetian)		Guinea-Bissau; Senegal	An ostracod belonging to the family Trachyleberididae.	
Bachmayerus	Gen. et sp. nov	Valid	Fraaije et al.	Late Jurassic to Early Cretaceous (Tithonian to early Berriasian)	Štramberk Limestone	Czech Republic	A hermit crab, a member of Diogenidae. The type species is Bachmayerus cavus.	
Bairdia akasakaensis	Sp. nov	Valid	Tanaka in Tanaka et al.	Middle Permian		Japan	An ostracod, a species of Bairdia.	
Bairdia anisongae	Sp. nov	Valid	Forel in Forel et al.	Late Permian to Early Triassic		Hungary	A bairdiid ostracod, a species of Bairdia.	
Bairdia baudini	Nom. nov	Valid	Crasquin in Forel et al.	Late Permian to Early Triassic		China; Hungary; Turkey	A replacement name for the bairdiid ostracod species Bairdia subsymmetrica (Shi in Shi and Chen, 1987).	
Bairdia davehornei	Sp. nov	Valid	Forel in Forel et al.	Late Permian to Early Triassic		Hungary	A bairdiid ostracod, a species of Bairdia.	
Bairdia nishiwakii	Sp. nov	Valid	Tanaka & Nishimura in Tanaka et al.	Middle Permian		Japan	An ostracod, a species of Bairdia.	
Bairdia oogakiensis	Sp. nov	Valid	Tanaka in Tanaka et al.	Middle Permian		Japan	An ostracod, a species of Bairdia.	
Bairdiacypris chaabetensis	Sp. nov	Valid	Andreu et al.	Late Cretaceous		Morocco	An ostracod.	
Bairdiacypris? hayasakai	Sp. nov	Valid	Tanaka in Tanaka et al.	Middle Permian		Japan	An ostracod, possibly a species of Bairdiacypris.	
Bathycalliax mediterranea	Sp. nov	Valid	Baldanza et al.	Early Pleistocene		Italy	A member of Callianassidae, a species of Bathycalliax.	
Bittnerilia pentagonalis	Sp. nov	Valid	Beschin, De Angeli & Zarantonello	Eocene		Italy	A crab belonging to the family Parthenopidae.	
Bonizzatoides	Gen. et sp. nov	Valid	Beschin, Busulini & Tessier	Eocene		Italy	A raninid crab. The type species is Bonizzatoides tuberculatus.	
Boschettocheles	Gen. et sp. nov	Valid	Beschin, De Angeli & Zarantonello	Eocene		Italy	Genus includes new species B. magnum.	
Brachycythere multidifferentis	Sp. nov	Valid	Nicolaidis & Piovesan in Piovesan et al.	Late Cretaceous (Cenomanian-Turonian)	Florianópolis Formation; Itajaí-Açu Formation; Itanhaém Formation	Brazil	An ostracod belonging to the family Brachycytheridae. Originally described as a species of Brachycythere; transferred to the genus Sapucariella by Puckett, Andreu & Colin (2016).	
Brasacypris subovatum	Sp. nov	Valid	Do Carmo et al.	Early Cretaceous (Aptian)	Alagamar Formation	Brazil	An ostracod, a species of Brasacypris.	
Bulbileaia	Gen. et sp. nov	Valid	Niu in Niu et al.	Late Permian	Taohaiyingzi Formation	China	A clam shrimp. The type species is Bulbileaia orientalis.	
Bullariscus	Gen. et 4 sp. nov	Valid	Robins, Feldmann & Schweitzer	Late Jurassic (Tithonian)	Ernstbrunn Limestone	Austria	A munidopsid galatheoid. Genus contains four species: Bullariscus arcuotorus, B. gibbernodus, B. patruliusi and B. triquetrus.	
Bythocypris amelkisensis	Sp. nov	Valid	Andreu et al.	Late Cretaceous		Algeria; Morocco	An ostracod.	
Calappilia minuta	Sp. nov	Valid	Beschin, Busulini & Tessier	Eocene		Italy	A calappid crab, a species of Calappilia.	
Callianassa (s.l.) ocozocoautlaensis	Sp. nov	Valid	Hyžný, Vega & Coutiño	Late Cretaceous (early Maastrichtian)	Ocozocoautla Formation	Mexico	A member of Callianassidae, a species of Callianassa (sensu lato). Announced in 2013; validated in 2023.	
Callicythere? balvanyseptentrioensis	Sp. nov	Valid	Forel in Forel et al.	Late Permian to Early Triassic		Hungary	A bythocytherid ostracod, a possible species of Callicythere.	
Candonocypris fimibolus	Sp. nov	Valid	Matzke-Karasz et al.	Early Miocene (23–16 Ma)	Riversleigh	Australia	An ostracod, a species of Candonocypris.	
Cavellina hashintotoi	Sp. nov	Valid	Tanaka & Maeda in Tanaka et al.	Middle Permian		Japan	An ostracod, a species of Cavellina.	
Cenomanocarcinus nammourensis	Sp. nov	Valid	Beschin & De Angeli	Late Cretaceous (Cenomanian)		Lebanon	A raninoid crab, a species of Cenomanocarcinus.	
Cenomanocarcinus robertsi	Sp. nov	Valid	Feldmann et al.	Late Cretaceous (Campanian)		United States	A raninoid crab, a species of Cenomanocarcinus.	
Charybdis (Charybdis) kinugawai	Sp. nov	Valid	Karasawa in Karasawa & Kinugawa	Late Pliocene	Ananai Formation	Japan	A portunid crab, a species of Charybdis.	
Chondromaia	Gen. et sp. nov	Valid	Feldmann et al.	Late Cretaceous (early Maastrichtian)	Mount Laurel Formation	United States	A majid crab. The type species is Chondromaia antiqua.	
Cirolana feldmanni	Sp. nov	Valid	Hyžný, Bruce & Schlögl	Early Miocene (late Karpatian, latest Burdigalian in the Mediterranean scale)	Lakšárska Nová Ves Formation	Slovakia	A cirolanid isopod, a species of Cirolana.	
Codoisopus	Gen. et sp. nov	Valid	Lindoso, Carvalho & Mendes	Early Cretaceous (Aptian)	Codó Formation	Brazil	An archaeoniscid isopod. The type species is Codoisopus brejensis.	
Costa ? deklaszi	Sp. nov	Valid	Sarr	Paleocene (Selandian-Thanetian)		Senegal	An ostracod belonging to the family Trachyleberididae.	
Cracensigillatus	Gen. et 2 sp. et comb. nov	Valid	Robins, Feldmann & Schweitzer	Late Jurassic (Kimmeridgian and Tithonian)	Ernstbrunn Limestone	Austria; Romania	A munidopsid galatheoid. Genus contains two new species: Cracensigillatus gracilirostrus and Cracensigillatus prolatus, as well as the species Cracensigillatus acutirostrus (Moericke, 1889).	
Cretamaja	Gen. et sp. nov	Valid	Klompmaker	Early Cretaceous (late Albian)	Eguino Formation	Spain	A crab belonging to the group Majoidea and the family Priscinachidae. The type species is Cretamaja granulata.	
Cryptopagurus	Gen. et sp. nov	Valid	Schweigert et al.	Early Jurassic (late Pliensbachian)		Germany	A hermit crab. The type species is Cryptopagurus svenhofmanni.	
Ctenocheles fabianii	Sp. nov	Valid	Beschin, Busulini & Tessier	Eocene		Italy	A member of Axiidea, a species of Ctenocheles.	
Culmenformosa	Gen. et 3 sp. nov	Valid	Robins, Feldmann & Schweitzer	Late Jurassic (Tithonian)	Ernstbrunn Limestone	Austria	A munidopsid galatheoid. Genus contains three species: Culmenformosa glaessneri, Culmenformosa nephelepera and Culmenformosa triastrixosa.	
Cycleryon bourseaui	Sp. nov	Valid	Audo et al.	Late Jurassic		France	An eryonid, a species of Cycleryon.	
Cytherella tazzouguertensis	Sp. nov	Valid	Andreu et al.	Late Cretaceous		Algeria; Morocco	An ostracod.	
Cytherellina? magyarorszagensis	Sp. nov	Valid	Forel in Forel et al.	Early Triassic (Griesbachian)	Gerennavár Limestone Formation	Hungary	A bairdiocypridid ostracod, a possible species of Cytherellina.	
Cytherelloidea saloumensis	Sp. nov	Valid	Sarr	Paleocene-Eocene (Thanetian-Ypresian)		Senegal	An ostracod belonging to the family Cytherellidae.	
Cytheropteron dakhlaensis	Sp. nov	Valid	Boukhary & Bassiouni in Boukhary et al.	Paleocene		Egypt	An ostracod.	
Cytheropteron mbeyensis	Sp. nov	Valid	Sarr	Paleocene (Selandian-Thanetian)		Senegal	An ostracod belonging to the family Cytheruridae.	
Dahomeya reticulata	Sp. nov	Valid	Sarr	Paleocene (Thanetian)		Senegal	An ostracod belonging to the family Brachycytheridae.	
Demania ahramensis	Sp. nov	Valid	Yazdi et al.	Middle Miocene	Mishan Formation	Iran	A xanthid crab, a species of Demania.	
Dinglecythere	Gen. et comb. nov	Valid	Antonietto et al.	Late Cretaceous (Santonian) to Eocene (Priabonian)		Australia; Jamaica; South Africa; United States	An ostracod belonging to the group Podocopida and the family Cytheridae. The type species is "Amphicytherura" tumida Dingle (1969); genus also includes "Amphicytherura" iniqua Holden (1964), "Amphicytherura" zululandensis Dingle (1980), "Amphicytherura" armatus Dingle (1981), "Amphicytherura" dinglei McKenzie et al. (1993) and "Amphicytherura" occulta Puckett & Colin in Puckett, Colin & Mitchell (2012).	
Diogenes lessineus	Sp. nov	Valid	Beschin, De Angeli & Zarantonello	Eocene		Italy	A crab belonging to the family Diogenidae.	
Discoidella niculaei	Sp. nov	Valid	Sebe in Sebe, Crasquin & Grădinaru	Middle Triassic (Anisian)		Romania	An ostracod belonging to the family Polycopidae.	
Distefania lauginigeri	Sp. nov	Valid	Feldmann et al.	Late Cretaceous (Campanian)		United States	A goniodromitid homolodromioid crab, a species of Distefania.	
Enoploclytia tepeyacensis	Sp. nov	Valid	Vega, Garassino & Zapata Jaime	Late Cretaceous (Campanian)		Mexico	An erymid, a species of Enoploclytia. Announced in 2013; validated in 2023.	
Eocytheropteron yoroensis	Sp. nov	Valid	Sarr	Paleocene (Thanetian)		Senegal	An ostracod belonging to the family Cytheruridae.	
Eosestheria yaozhanensis	Sp. nov	Valid	Wang	Late Jurassic	Dabeigou Formation	China	A clam shrimp, a species of Eosestheria.	
Etyus makrochele	Sp. nov	Valid	Feldmann, Schweitzer & Lehmann	Early Cretaceous (late Albian)		Germany	An etyiid crab, a species of Etyus.	
Eumiraculum desmaresae	Sp. nov	Valid	Forel in Forel et al.	Late Permian (Changhsingian)	Nagyvisnyó Limestone Formation	Hungary	An ostracod of uncertain affinities, a species of Cytherellina.	
Eurotetralia	Gen. et comb. nov	Valid	De Angeli & Ceccon	Eocene		Hungary; Italy	A tetraliid trapezioid; a new genus for "Trapezia" loerenthey Müller (1975).	
Fossocytheridea ballentae	Sp. nov	Valid	Piovesan & Nicolaidis in Piovesan et al.	Cretaceous (Albian-Santonian)	Florianópólis Formation; Itajaí-Açú Formation	Brazil	An ostracod belonging to the family Cytherideidae.	
Fossocytheridea elegans	Sp. nov	Valid	Piovesan & Nicolaidis in Piovesan et al.	Early Cretaceous (Albian)	Florianópólis Formation	Brazil	An ostracod belonging to the family Cytherideidae.	
Gastrodorus kotoucensis	Sp. nov	Valid	Fraaije et al.	Late Jurassic to Early Cretaceous (Tithonian to early Berriasian)	Štramberk Limestone	Czech Republic	A hermit crab, a member of Gastrodoridae; a species of Gastrodorus.	
Gastrosacus aequabus	Sp. nov	Valid	Robins, Feldmann & Schweitzer	Late Jurassic (Tithonian)	Ernstbrunn Limestone	Austria	A munidopsid galatheoid, a species of Gastrosacus.	
Gastrosacus levocardiacus	Sp. nov	Valid	Robins, Feldmann & Schweitzer	Late Jurassic (Tithonian)	Ernstbrunn Limestone	Austria	A munidopsid galatheoid, a species of Gastrosacus.	
Gastrosacus limacurvus	Sp. nov	Valid	Robins, Feldmann & Schweitzer	Late Jurassic (Tithonian)	Ernstbrunn Limestone	Austria	A munidopsid galatheoid, a species of Gastrosacus.	
Gastrosacus pisinnus	Sp. nov	Valid	Robins, Feldmann & Schweitzer	Late Jurassic (Tithonian)	Ernstbrunn Limestone	Austria	A munidopsid galatheoid, a species of Gastrosacus.	
Gastrosacus torosus	Sp. nov	Valid	Robins, Feldmann & Schweitzer	Late Jurassic (Tithonian)	Ernstbrunn Limestone	Austria	A munidopsid galatheoid, a species of Gastrosacus.	
Gaudipluma	Gen. et sp. nov	Valid	Artal et al.	Eocene		Spain	A retroplumid crab. The type species is Gaudipluma bacamortensis.	
Gifuaparchites	Gen. et sp. nov	Valid	Tanaka & Maeda in Tanaka et al.	Middle Permian		Japan	An ostracod. The type species is Gifuaparchites takagii.	
Gigacerina	Gen. et comb. nov	Valid	Charbonnier et al.	Late Jurassic		France	A member of the family Glypheidae. Genus includes "Glyphea" saemanni Oppel (1861).	Gigacerina saemanni
Glyphea macromuscula	Sp. nov	Valid	Feldmann & Schweitzer	Early Jurassic		United Kingdom	A glypheoid, a species of Glyphea.	
Glypheopsis trouvillensis	Sp. nov	Valid	Charbonnier et al.	Late Jurassic		France	A member of the family Glypheidae.	
Glypheopsis voultensis	Sp. nov	Valid	Charbonnier et al.	Middle Jurassic	La Voulte-sur-Rhône	France	A member of the family Glypheidae.	
Glypturus persicus	Sp. nov	Valid	Hyžný et al.	Middle-Late Miocene		Iran	A callianassid, a species of Glypturus.	
Harbinia crepata	Sp. nov	Valid	Do Carmo et al.	Early Cretaceous (Aptian)	Alagamar Formation	Brazil	An ostracod, a species of Harbinia.	
Harbinia dimorphica	Sp. nov	Valid	Do Carmo et al.	Early Cretaceous (Aptian)	Alagamar Formation	Brazil	An ostracod, a species of Harbinia.	
Hardapestheria	Gen. et sp. nov	Valid	Stigall et al.	Early Jurassic	Kalkrand Formation	Namibia	An eosestheriid clam shrimp. The type species is Hardapestheria maxwelli.	
Hazelina ? foundiougnensis	Sp. nov	Valid	Sarr	Paleocene (Thanetian)		Senegal	An ostracod belonging to the family Trachyleberididae.	
Hemicycloleaia	Gen. et sp. nov	Valid	Niu in Niu et al.	Late Permian	Taohaiyingzi Formation	China	A clam shrimp. The type species is Hemicycloleaia curtus.	
Hemiparacytheridea sagittaemucronata	Sp. nov	Valid	Andreu et al.	Late Cretaceous		Morocco	An ostracod.	
Hermanites ? pustulosa	Sp. nov	Valid	Sarr	Eocene		Mauritania; Senegal	An ostracod belonging to the family Trachyleberididae.	
Heterocypris collaris	Sp. nov	Valid	Matzke-Karasz et al.	Early Miocene (23–16 Ma)	Riversleigh	Australia	An ostracod, a species of Heterocypris.	
Hollinella fengqinglaii	Sp. nov	Valid	Crasquin in Forel et al.	Late Permian (Changhsingian)	Nagyvisnyó Limestone Formation	Hungary	A hollinellid ostracod, a species of Hollinella.	
Housacheles	Gen. et sp. nov	Valid	Fraaije et al.	Late Jurassic to Early Cretaceous (Tithonian to early Berriasian)	Štramberk Limestone	Czech Republic	A hermit crab, a member of Parapylochelidae. The type species is Housacheles timidus.	
Hungarella gerennavarensis	Sp. nov	Valid	Crasquin in Forel et al.	Early Triassic (Griesbachian)	Gerennavár Limestone Formation	Hungary	A healdiid ostracod, a species of Hungarella.	
Joeranina colombiana	Sp. nov	Valid	Bermúdez et al.	Early Cretaceous (middle Albian)		Colombia	A palaeocorystid decapod, a species of Joeranina.	
Joeranina goshourajimensis	Sp. nov	Valid	Karasawa & Komatsu	Early Cretaceous (late Albian)	Enokuchi Formation	Japan	A palaeocorystid raninoid crab, a species of Joeranina.	
Joeranina houssineaui	Sp. nov	Valid	Van Bakel	Late Cretaceous (Cenomanian)		France	A palaeocorystid decapod, a species of Joeranina.	
Kellnerius	Gen. et sp. nov	Valid	Santana et al.	Early Cretaceous (Albian)	Romualdo Formation	Brazil	A palaemonid. The type species is Kellnerius jamacaruensis.	
Keslingiella? teresae	Sp. nov	Valid	Salas, Rustán & Sterren	Devonian	Punta Negra Formation	Argentina; South Africa?	An ostracod belonging to the group Podocopida and possibly to the family Quasillitidae.	
Knebelia totoroi	Sp. nov	Valid	Audo et al.	Late Jurassic (late Kimmeridgian to early Tithonian)		Germany	An eryonid, a species of Knebelia.	
Koskobilius	Gen. et sp. nov	Valid	Klompmaker	Early Cretaceous (late Albian)	Eguino Formation	Spain	A crab belonging to the group Majoidea and the family Priscinachidae. The type species is Koskobilius postangustus.	
Laeviprosopon crassum	Sp. nov	Valid	Klompmaker	Early Cretaceous (late Albian)	Eguino Formation	Spain	A crab belonging to the family Prosopidae, a species of Laeviprosopon.	
Laeviprosopon edoi	Sp. nov	Valid	Klompmaker	Early Cretaceous (late Albian)	Eguino Formation	Spain	A crab belonging to the family Prosopidae, a species of Laeviprosopon.	
Laeviprosopon hispanicum	Sp. nov	Valid	Klompmaker	Early Cretaceous (late Albian)	Eguino Formation	Spain	A crab belonging to the family Prosopidae, a species of Laeviprosopon.	
Laeviprosopon planum	Sp. nov	Valid	Klompmaker	Early Cretaceous (late Albian)	Eguino Formation	Spain	A crab belonging to the family Prosopidae, a species of Laeviprosopon.	
Langdaia bullabalvanyensis	Sp. nov	Valid	Crasquin in Forel et al.	Early Triassic		Hungary; Italy	An ostracod, a species of Langdaia.	
Lapazites trinodis	Sp. nov	Valid	Salas, Rustán & Sterren	Devonian (Emsian)	Punta Negra Formation	Argentina	An ostracod belonging to the group Palaeocopida and the superfamily Kloedenelloidea.	
Latheticocarcinus italicus	Sp. nov	Valid	De Angeli & Ceccon	Eocene (Ypresian)		Italy	A crab belonging to the family Homolidae.	
Lessinilambrus	Gen. et sp. nov	Valid	Beschin, De Angeli & Zarantonello	Eocene		Italy	A crab belonging to the family Parthenopidae. Genus includes new species L. paleogenicus.	
Liuzhinia bankutensis	Sp. nov	Valid	Forel in Forel et al.	Late Permian to Early Triassic		Hungary	An ostracod, a species of Liuzhinia.	
Liuzhinia venninae	Sp. nov	Valid	Forel in Forel et al.	Early Triassic (Griesbachian)	Gerennavár Limestone Formation	Hungary	An ostracod, a species of Liuzhinia.	
Loxoconcha akrabouensis	Sp. nov	Valid	Andreu et al.	Late Cretaceous		Morocco	An ostracod.	
Loxoconcha ? ngolothiensis	Sp. nov	Valid	Sarr	Paleocene (Thanetian)		Senegal	An ostracod belonging to the family Loxoconchidae.	
Meridecaris	Gen. et sp. nov	Valid	Stockar & Garassino	Middle Triassic (Ladinian)	Meride Limestone	Switzerland	A clytiopsid decapod. The type species is Meridecaris ladinica.	
Metahomarus	Gen. et sp. nov	Valid	Franţescu	Early Cretaceous (Albian)	Pawpaw Shale	United States	A lobster. The type species is Metahomarus reidi.	
Mexicania	Gen. et sp. nov	Valid	Garassino et al.	Late Cretaceous (Cenomanian)	Sierra Madre Formation	Mexico	A member of Sicyoniidae. The type species is M. grijalvaensis.	
Microcheilinella egerensis	Sp. nov	Valid	Forel in Forel et al.	Early Triassic (Griesbachian)	Gerennavár Limestone Formation	Hungary	A pachydomellid ostracod, a species of Microcheilinella.	
Moianella	Gen. et sp. nov	Valid	Ossó & Domínguez	Late Eocene (Priabonian)		Spain	A crab, possibly a member of Cancroidea. The type species is Moianella cervantesi.	
Mokaya	Gen. et sp. nov	Valid	Garassino et al.	Late Cretaceous (Cenomanian)	Sierra Madre Formation	Mexico	A member of Sergestidae. The type species is M. changoensis.	
Mongolitubulus aspermachaera	Sp. nov	Valid	Topper et al.	Cambrian (Furongian)		Sweden	A mongolitubulid, a member of Bradoriida; a species of Mongolitubulus.	
Nantocyclois	Gen. et sp. nov	Valid	Beschin, Busulini & Tessier	Eocene		Italy	A calappid crab. The type species is Nantocyclois eocenicus.	
Navarrara	Gen. et sp. nov	Valid	Klompmaker	Early Cretaceous (late Albian)	Eguino Formation	Spain	A crab belonging to the group Glaessneropsoidea and the family Longodromitidae. The type species is Navarrara betsieae.	
Nestoria donggouensis	Sp. nov	Valid	Wang	Early Cretaceous	Qingshuihe Formation	China	A clam shrimp, a species of Nestoria.	
Nestoria jungarensis	Sp. nov	Valid	Wang	Early Cretaceous	Qingshuihe Formation	China	A clam shrimp, a species of Nestoria.	
Nestoria shawanensis	Sp. nov	Valid	Wang	Early Cretaceous	Qingshuihe Formation	China	A clam shrimp, a species of Nestoria.	
Newnhamia mckenziana	Sp. nov	Valid	Matzke-Karasz et al.	Early Miocene (23–16 Ma)	Riversleigh	Australia	An ostracod, a species of Newnhamia.	
Nigeroloxoconcha itanhaensis	Sp. nov	Valid	Nicolaidis & Piovesan in Piovesan et al.	Late Cretaceous (Cenomanian)	Itanhaém Formation	Brazil	An ostracod belonging to the family Loxoconchidae.	
Notopoides nantoensis	Sp. nov	Valid	Beschin, Busulini & Tessier	Eocene		Italy	A raninid crab, a species of Notopoides.	
Octoeurax	Gen. et sp. nov	Valid	Robins, Feldmann & Schweitzer	Late Jurassic (Tithonian)	Ernstbrunn Limestone	Austria	A munidopsid galatheoid. The type species is Octoeurax acaresprora.	
Ordonyia dabadibensis	Sp. nov	Valid	Boukhary & Sharabi in Boukhary et al.	Paleocene		Egypt	An ostracod.	
Orhomalus arpi	Sp. nov	Valid	Schweigert et al.	Early Jurassic (late Toarcian)		Germany	A hermit crab, a species of Orhomalus.	
Orhomalus dubrullei	Sp. nov	Valid	Schweigert et al.	Early Jurassic (late Pliensbachian)		France	A hermit crab, a species of Orhomalus.	
Orthonotacythere spinata	Sp. nov	Valid	Sarr	Paleocene (Thanetian)		Senegal	An ostracod belonging to the family Cytheruridae.	
Oryctocaris	Gen. et comb. nov	Valid	Bergmann & Rust	Early Devonian		Germany	A phyllocarid; a new genus for "Nahecaris" balssi Broili (1930).	
Paguritergites	Gen. et sp. nov	Valid	Fraaije et al.	Early Cretaceous (late Albian)	Eguino Formation	Spain	A hermit crab, possibly a member of Paguridae. The type species is Paguritergites yvonnecooleae.	
Palaeobenthesicymus	gen. et comb nov	Valid	Audo & Charbonnier	Late Santonian	Sahel Alma Lagerstätte	Lebanon	A benthesicymid penaeoid, a new genus for "Penaeus" libanensis (Brocchi, 1875).	
Palaeocypridina	Gen. et 2 sp. nov	Valid	Crasquin in Sebe, Crasquin & Grădinaru	Middle Triassic (Anisian)		Romania	An ostracod belonging to the family Cypridinellidae. The type species is P. tulceaensis Sebe in Sebe, Crasquin & Grădinaru; genus also includes P. agighiolensis Sebe in Sebe, Crasquin & Grădinaru.	
Palinurus veronicae	Sp. nov	Valid	Franţescu	Early Cretaceous (Albian)	Pawpaw Shale	United States	A lobster, a species of Palinurus.	
Panopeus bericus	Sp. nov	Valid	Beschin, Busulini & Tessier	Eocene		Italy	A panopeid crab, a species of Panopeus.	
Paracypria? elongata	Sp. nov	Valid	Do Carmo et al.	Early Cretaceous (Aptian)	Alagamar Formation	Brazil	An ostracod, possibly a species of Paracypria.	
Paracypris eniotmetos	Sp. nov	Valid	Nicolaidis & Piovesan in Piovesan et al.	Cretaceous (Albian-Santonian)	Florianópolis Formation; Itanhaém Formation; Juréia Formation; São Mateus Formation	Brazil	An ostracod belonging to the family Candonidae.	
Paraglyphea mistelgauensis	Sp. nov	Valid	Charbonnier et al.	Early Jurassic		Germany	A member of the family Glypheidae.	
Parallelogastrus	Gen. et sp. nov	Valid	Franţescu	Early Cretaceous (Albian)	Pawpaw Shale	United States	A lobster. The type species is Parallelogastrus gabii.	
Parapalaemonetes	Gen. st sp. nov	Valid	Brandt & Schulz	Middle Triassic (Ladinian)	Meißner Formation	Germany	A member of the family Palaemonidae. The type species is P. thuringiacus.	
Parapylochelitergites	Gen. et sp. nov	Valid	Fraaije et al.	Early Cretaceous (late Albian)	Eguino Formation	Spain	A hermit crab, possibly a member of Parapylochelidae. The type species is Parapylochelitergites pustulosus.	
Paratetralia sulcata	Sp. nov	Valid	De Angeli & Ceccon	Eocene (Ypresian)		Italy	A trapeziid trapezioid, a species of Paratetralia.	
Parthenope chiampensis	Sp. nov	Valid	Beschin, De Angeli & Zarantonello	Eocene		Italy	A crab belonging to the family Parthenopidae.	
Pauline	Gen. et sp. nov	Valid	Siveter et al.	Silurian	Wenlock Group	United Kingdom	A cylindroleberidid myodocope ostracod. The type species is Pauline avibella.	
Pegomyrmekella	Gen. et sp. nov	Valid	Robins, Feldmann & Schweitzer	Late Jurassic (Tithonian)	Ernstbrunn Limestone	Austria	A munidopsid galatheoid. The type species is Pegomyrmekella chaulia.	
Philyra karkata	Sp. nov	Valid	Rai et al.	Early Miocene	Khari Nadi Formation	India	A leucosiid crab, a species of Philyra.	
Pircawayra	Gen. et comb. et sp. nov	Valid	Salas, Rustán & Sterren	Devonian	Belén Formation; Punta Negra Formation; Talacasto Formation	Argentina; Bolivia; South Africa?	An ostracod belonging to the group Palaeocopida and the superfamily Kloedenelloidea. The type species is "Pinnatulites"? peregrina Přibyl (1984); genus also includes new species P. gigantea.	
Planocarcinus johnjagti	Sp. nov	Valid	Bermúdez et al.	Early Cretaceous (late Aptian)		Colombia	A necrocarcinid raninoid crab, a species of Planocarcinus.	
Pokornyella lagandongi	Sp. nov	Valid	Sarr	Paleocene (Thanetian)		Senegal	An ostracod belonging to the family Hemicytheridae.	
Polzicaris	Gen. et comb. nov	Valid	Haug et al.	Late Cretaceous (Santonian)		Lebanon	A member of Achelata; a new genus for "Eryoneicus" sahelalmae Roger (1944).	
Pontocypris tadighoustensis	Sp. nov	Valid	Andreu et al.	Late Cretaceous		Morocco	An ostracod.	
Poupelicaris	Gen. et sp. nov	Valid	Racheboeuf & Gourvennec	Devonian (Lochkovian)		Bolivia	A member of Phyllocarida. The type species is Poupelicaris elegans.	
Praemonoleaia	Gen. et 6 sp. nov	Valid	Niu in Niu et al.	Late Permian	Taohaiyingzi Formation	China	A clam shrimp. Genus contains species Praemonoleaia ampulliformis, P. elliptica, P. oblonga, P. ovalis, P. rotunda and P. subtriangularis.	
Procytherura? elongatissima	Sp. nov	Valid	Andreu et al.	Late Cretaceous		Morocco	An ostracod.	
Protobuntonia baolensis	Sp. nov	Valid	Sarr	Paleocene (Selandian-Thanetian)		Senegal	An ostracod belonging to the family Trachyleberididae.	
Puriana sokonensis	Sp. nov	Valid	Sarr	Paleocene (Thanetian)		Senegal	An ostracod belonging to the family Trachyleberididae.	
Pylochelitergites alatus	Sp. nov	Valid	Fraaije et al.	Early Cretaceous (late Albian)	Eguino Formation	Spain	A hermit crab, possibly a member of Pylochelidae; a species of Pylochelitergites.	
Pylochelitergites rugosus	Sp. nov	Valid	Fraaije et al.	Early Cretaceous (late Albian)	Eguino Formation	Spain	A hermit crab, possibly a member of Pylochelidae; a species of Pylochelitergites.	
Pylochelitergites stramberkensis	Sp. nov	Valid	Fraaije et al.	Late Jurassic to Early Cretaceous (Tithonian to early Berriasian)	Štramberk Limestone	Czech Republic	A hermit crab, possibly a member of Pylochelidae; a species of Pylochelitergites.	
Rathbunassa	Gen. et comb. nov	Valid	Hyžný in Bermúdez et al.	Early Cretaceous		Colombia; United States	A callianassid decapod, a new genus for "Callianassa" aquilae Rathbun (1935).	
Rectaglyphea	Gen. et sp. nov	Valid	Charbonnier et al.	Cretaceous		United Kingdom	A member of the family Glypheidae. Genus includes new species R. howardae.	
Rehacythereis errachidiaensis	Sp. nov	Valid	Andreu et al.	Late Cretaceous		Morocco	An ostracod.	
Rehacythereis zizensis	Sp. nov	Valid	Andreu et al.	Late Cretaceous		Morocco	An ostracod.	
Reviya praecurukensis	Sp. nov	Valid	Forel in Forel et al.	Late Permian (Changhsingian)	Nagyvisnyó Limestone Formation	Hungary; Serbia?	A kirkbyid ostracod, a species of Reviya.	
Rolerithosia	Gen. et sp. nov	Valid	Collins, Villier & Breton	Late Cretaceous (Cenomanian)		France	An etyiid crab. The type species is Rolerithosia lobulata.	
Rosacythere denticulata	Sp. nov	Valid	Tibert et al.	Early Cretaceous	Escucha Formation	Spain	An ostracod.	
Rosagammarus	Gen. et sp. nov	Valid	McMenamin, Zapata & Hussey	Late Triassic (Norian)	Luning Formation	United States	Originally interpreted as an amphipod; the holotype specimen was subsequently reinterpreted as the right half of a decapod tail of uncertain taxonomic affinity. The type species is Rosagammarus minichiellus.	
Scalpellum carentanensis	Sp. nov	Valid	Carriol	Pliocene		France	A barnacle, a species of Scalpellum.	
Schernfeldia	Gen. et sp. nov	Valid	Winkler	Late Jurassic (early Tithonian)	Eichstätt Formation	Germany	An acratiid caridean shrimp of uncertain phylogenetic placement. The type species is Schernfeldia schweigerti.	
Schizocythere wiedmanni	Sp. nov	Valid	Sarr	Paleocene (Thanetian)		Senegal	An ostracod belonging to the family Schizocytheridae.	
Schobertella	Gen. et 2 sp. nov	Valid	Schweigert et al.	Early Jurassic (late Hettangian to late Pliensbachian)		Germany	A hermit crab. Genus contains species Schobertella simonsenetlangi and Schobertella hoelderi.	
Scyllarella adinae	Sp. nov	Valid	Franţescu	Early Cretaceous (Albian)	Pawpaw Shale	United States	A lobster, a species of Scyllarella.	
Seorsus kauffmani	Sp. nov	Valid	Feldmann et al.	Late Cretaceous (Turonian)	Mancos Shale	United States	A dakoticancroid crab. Originally described as a species of Seorsus, but subsequently transferred to the genus Synoriacarcinus.	
Serrablopluma	Gen. et sp. nov	Valid	Artal et al.	Eocene		Spain	A retroplumid crab. The type species is Serrablopluma diminuta.	
Shemonaella? olempskaella	Sp. nov	Valid	Forel in Forel et al.	Late Permian (Changhsingian)	Nagyvisnyó Limestone Formation	Hungary	A paraparchitid ostracod, a possible species of Shemonaella.	
Shiheziestheria	Gen. et sp. nov	Valid	Wang	Early Cretaceous	Qingshuihe Formation	China	A clam shrimp. The type species is Shiheziestheria pangi.	
Shipingia weemsi	Sp. nov	Valid	Kozur, Franz & Bachmann	Late Triassic (late Carnian to early Norian)	Arnstadt Formation; Weser Formation	Germany	A clam shrimp, a species of Shipingia.	
Soleryon	Gen. et 2 sp. et comb. nov	Valid	Audo et al.	Middle and Late Jurassic		France; Germany	An eryonid. Genus contains two new species: Soleryon amicalis and S. schorri, as well as "Eryon" perroni Étallon (1859) and "Eryon" giganteus Van Straelen (1923).	
Spinogriphus	Gen. et sp. nov	Valid	Jaume, Pinardo-Moya & Boxshall	Early Cretaceous (late Barremian)		Spain	An acadiocaridid, a member of Spelaeogriphacea. The type species is Spinogriphus ibericus.	
Squilla taulinanus	Sp. nov	Valid	Ahyong, Charbonnier & Garassino	Miocene (Burdigalian)		France	A squillid mantis shrimp, a species of Squilla.	
Stenodactylina rogerfurzei	Sp. nov	Valid	Schweigert	Middle Jurassic (late Aalenian)		Germany	An erymid decapod, a species of Stenodactylina.	
Systenobythere	Gen. et sp. nov	Valid	Warne & Whatley	Late Miocene		Australia	An ostracod. The type species is Systenobythere archboldi.	
Tanidromites maerteni	Sp. nov	Valid	Fraaije et al.	Middle Jurassic (Bajocian)		France	A tanidromitid crab, a relative of homolodromiids; a species of Tanidromites. Announced in 2013; validated in 2023.	
Tetralia vicetina	Sp. nov	Valid	De Angeli & Ceccon	Eocene (Ypresian)		Italy	A tetraliid trapezioid, a species of Tetralia.	
Theriosynoecum arinnoensis	Sp. nov	Valid	Tibert et al.	Early Cretaceous	Escucha Formation	Spain	An ostracod.	
Theriosynoecum colini	Sp. nov	Valid	Do Carmo et al.	Early Cretaceous (Aptian)	Alagamar Formation	Brazil	An ostracod, a species of Theriosynoecum.	
Theriosynoecum escuchaensis	Sp. nov	Valid	Tibert et al.	Early Cretaceous	Escucha Formation	Spain	An ostracod.	
Theriosynoecum guzzoi	Sp. nov	Valid	Do Carmo et al.	Early Cretaceous (Aptian)	Alagamar Formation	Brazil	An ostracod, a species of Theriosynoecum.	
Tzeltalpenaeus	Gen. et sp. nov	Valid	Garassino et al.	Late Cretaceous (Cenomanian)	Sierra Madre Formation	Mexico	A member of Penaeidae. The type species is T. exilichelatus.	
Upogebia aronae	Sp. nov	Valid	Haug, Nyborg & Vega	Middle Eocene	Santiago Formation	United States	A member of Upogebiidae, a species of Upogebia.	
Urocythereis castelaini	Sp. nov	Valid	Sarr	Paleocene (Thanetian)		Senegal	An ostracod belonging to the family Hemicytheridae.	
Urocythereis sinesaloumensis	Sp. nov	Valid	Sarr	Paleocene-Eocene (Thanetian-Ypresian)		Senegal	An ostracod belonging to the family Hemicytheridae.	
Uromuellerina guiraudi	Sp. nov	Valid	Sarr	Eocene (Ypresian-Lutetian)		Senegal	An ostracod belonging to the family Hemicytheridae.	
Veenia (Nigeria) mediacostarobusta	Sp. nov	Valid	Andreu et al.	Late Cretaceous		Morocco	An ostracod.	
Veenia (Nigeria) tardaensis	Sp. nov	Valid	Andreu et al.	Late Cretaceous		Morocco	An ostracod.	
Vetoplautus	Gen. et sp. nov	Valid	Robins, Feldmann & Schweitzer	Late Jurassic (Tithonian)	Ernstbrunn Limestone	Austria	A munidopsid galatheoid. The type species is Vetoplautus latimarginus.	
Wrangelleryon	Gen. et sp. nov	Valid	Feldmann, Schweitzer & Haggart	Early Jurassic (Hettangian)	Sandilands Formation	Canada	An eryonid. The type species is Wrangelleryon perates.	
Xestoleberis circinatus	Sp. nov	Valid	Andreu et al.	Late Cretaceous		Morocco	An ostracod.	
Xestoleberis? preafricanensis	Sp. nov	Valid	Andreu et al.	Late Cretaceous		Morocco	An ostracod.	
Zoquepenaeus	Gen. et sp. nov	Valid	Garassino et al.	Late Cretaceous (Cenomanian)	Sierra Madre Formation	Mexico	A member of Penaeidae. The type species is Z. spinirostratus.	
Zygastrocarcinus carolinasensis	Sp. nov	Valid	Klompmaker, Flores-Ventura & Vega	Late Cretaceous (late Campanian)	Cerro del Pueblo Formation	Mexico	A homolid crab, a species of Zygastrocarcinus.	

== Trilobites ==
Name	Novelty	Status	Authors	Age	Unit	Location	Notes	Images
Acanthopyge (Belenopyge) estevei	Sp. nov	Valid	Corbacho & Kier	Devonian (Pragian)	Ihandar Formation	Morocco	A member of Lichida belonging to the family Lichidae, a species of Acanthopyge.	
Acastava? lerougei	Sp. nov	Valid	Van Viersen	Devonian	Riviere Formation	Belgium		
Acrocephalaspis maximus	Sp. nov	Valid	Makarova	Cambrian	Chopko Formation	Russia	A member of the family Acrocephalitidae.	
Acrocephalites schistosus	Sp. nov	Valid	Makarova	Cambrian	Chopko Formation	Russia	A member of the family Acrocephalitidae.	
Adelogonus oblongus	Sp. nov	Valid	Lin et al.	Cambrian	Liudaogou Group	China	A polymerid trilobite belonging to the family Proasaphiscidae, a species of Adelogonus.	
Akantharges mbareki	Sp. nov	Valid	Corbacho & López-Soriano	Devonian (Eifelian)		Morocco	A member of Lichida belonging to the family Lichidae, a species of Akantharges.	
Basseiarges	Gen. et sp. nov	Disputed	Corbacho & López-Soriano	Devonian (Eifelian)		Morocco	A member of Lichida belonging to the family Lichidae. The type species is Basseiarges mellishae. Van Viersen (2021) considered Basseiarges to be a junior synonym of the genus Akantharges.	
Bathyurellus diclementsae	Sp. nov	Valid	Fortey & Bruton	Early Ordovician	Kirtonryggen Formation	Norway	A bathyurid proetid, a species of Bathyurellus.	
Bolbocephalus gunnari	Sp. nov	Valid	Fortey & Bruton	Early Ordovician	Kirtonryggen Formation	Norway	A bathyurid proetid, a species of Bolbocephalus.	
Bolbochasmops kaskovoensis	Sp. nov	Valid	Krueger	Ordovician		Russia	A member of the family Pterygometopidae.	
Cambrunicornia? jafnaensis	Sp. nov	Valid	Elicki & Geyer	Cambrian		Jordan	A protolenine ellipsocephalid, possibly a species of Cambrunicornia.	
Canningbole	Gen. et 3 sp. nov	Valid	Feist & McNamara	Late Devonian	Virgin Hills Formation	Australia	A member of Proetida. The type species is Canningbole latimargo; genus also contains C. henwoodorum and C. macromma.	
Catochia hinlopensis	Sp. nov	Valid	Fortey & Bruton	Early Ordovician	Kirtonryggen Formation	Norway	A bathyurid proetid, a species of Catochia.	
Ceraurinus zhuzhaiensis	sp nov	Valid	Lee	Late Ordovician	Xiazhen Formation	China	A cheirurid, a species of Ceraurinus.	
Chapmanopyge	Nom. nov	Valid	Fortey & Bruton	Ordovician		Greenland; Norway; United States	A bathyurid proetid; a replacement name for Chapmania Loch (2007).	
Chattiaspis? budili	Sp. nov	Valid	Corbacho & López-Soriano	Ordovician (early Katian)	Ktaoua Formation	Morocco	A member of Dalmanitidae, possibly a species of Chattiaspis.	
Chlupaciparia (Australoparia)	Subgen. et 2 sp. nov	Valid	Feist & McNamara	Late Devonian	Virgin Hills Formation	Australia	A member of Proetida, a subgenus of Chlupaciparia. The type species is Chlupaciparia (Australoparia) australis; genus also contains C. (Australoparia) lata.	
Chlupaciparia (Chlupaciparia) planiops	Sp. nov	Valid	Feist & McNamara	Late Devonian	Virgin Hills Formation	Australia	A member of Proetida, a species of Chlupaciparia.	
Cirriticeps	Gen. et sp. et comb. nov	Valid	Holloway	Silurian		Australia	A member of Proetida belonging to the family Tropidocoryphidae. The type species is C. auranticum; genus also includes "Proetus" rattei Etheridge & Mitchell (1891).	
Dianops algeriensis	Sp. nov	Valid	Crônier et al.	Devonian (Famennian)	'Argiles de Marhouma' Formation	Algeria	A member of Phacopidae.	
Eurysymphysurina	Gen. et sp. nov	Valid	Fortey & Bruton	Early Ordovician	Kirtonryggen Formation	Norway	A symphysurinid cyclopygoid member of Asaphida. The type species is Eurysymphysurina spora.	
Gabriellus kierorum	Sp. nov	Valid	Corbacho & López-Soriano	Early Cambrian	Rosella Formation	Canada	A member of Redlichiida belonging to the family Judomiidae, a species of Gabriellus.	
Gandlops	Gen. et comb. nov	Valid	Bignon & Crônier	Devonian (Emsian)		France; Morocco; Spain	An asteropygine phacopidan, a new genus for "Kayserops" brevispinosus Gandl (1972). Genus also contains Gandlops ogivalis (Morzadec, 1976), G. palenciae (Smeenk, 1983) and G. tamnrherta (Chatterton et al., 2006).	
Harlandaspis	Gen. et sp. nov	Valid	Fortey & Bruton	Early Ordovician	Kirtonryggen Formation	Norway	A bathyurid proetid. The type species is Harlandaspis elongata.	
Heliopyge sohensis	Sp. nov	Valid	Ghobadi Pour in Ghobadi Pour et al.	Devonian (Frasnian)		Iran	A member of Phacopida belonging to the family Acastidae.	
Hibbertia aodiensis	sp nov	Valid	Lee	Late Ordovician	Xiazhen Formation	China	A harpetid, a species of Hibbertia.	
Illaenus (Parillaenus) primoticus	Sp. nov	Valid	Fortey & Bruton	Early Ordovician	Kirtonryggen Formation	Norway	An illaenid corynexochid, a species of Illaenus.	
Issalia	Gen. et sp. nov	Valid	Elicki & Geyer	Cambrian		Jordan	An ellipsocephaline ellipsocephalid. The type species is Issalia scutalis.	
Jaylopygiella debruni	Sp. nov	Valid	Van Viersen	Devonian	Riviere Formation	Belgium	A member of Acastidae.	
Jeffersonia striagena	Sp. nov	Valid	Fortey & Bruton	Early Ordovician	Kirtonryggen Formation	Norway	A bathyurid proetid, a species of Jeffersonia.	
Jeffersonia viator	Sp. nov	Valid	Fortey & Bruton	Early Ordovician	Kirtonryggen Formation	Norway	A bathyurid proetid, a species of Jeffersonia.	
Lachnostoma platypyga	Sp. nov	Valid	Fortey & Bruton	Early Ordovician	Kirtonryggen Formation	Norway	An asaphid, a species of Lachnostoma.	
Leiostegium spongiosum	Sp. nov	Valid	Fortey & Bruton	Early Ordovician	Kirtonryggen Formation	Norway	A leiostegiid corynexochid, a species of Leiostegium.	
Linguaphillipsia simekuhensis	Sp. nov	Valid	Hahn, Müller & Aghababalou	Carboniferous (Tournaisian)	Mobarak Formation	Iran	A member of Phillipsiidae, a species of Linguaphillipsia.	
Meteoraspis qinghaiensis	Sp. nov	Valid	Lin et al.	Cambrian	Liudaogou Group	China	A polymerid trilobite belonging to the family Crepicephalidae, a species of Meteoraspis.	
Minicryphaeus	Gen. et comb. nov	Valid	Bignon & Crônier	Devonian (Pragian)		Morocco	An asteropygine phacopidan, a new genus for "Pseudocryphaeus" minimus Morzadec (2001). Genus also contains Minicryphaeus quarterspinosus (Morzadec, 2001) and M. sarirus (Morzadec, 2001)	
Morzadecops	Gen. et comb. nov	Disputed	Bignon & Crônier	Devonian (middle Pragian to early Emsian)		Morocco; Spain	An asteropygine phacopidan, a new genus for "Pilletina" zguidensis Morzadec (2001). Genus also contains Morzadecops matutina (Gandl, 1972). The genus Morzadecops was considered to be a junior synonym of the genus Feruminops by Van Viersen & Kloc (2022).	
Myopsolenites hyperion	Sp. nov	Valid	Elicki & Geyer	Cambrian		Jordan	A bathynotid, a species of Myopsolenites.	
Pagetides johannis	Sp. nov	Valid	Fletcher & Greene	Cambrian	Young's Cove Formation	Canada	A species of Pagetides.	
Palpebralia initialis	Sp. nov	Valid	Feist & McNamara	Late Devonian	Virgin Hills Formation	Australia	A member of Proetida, a species of Palpebralia.	
Palpebralia pustulata	Sp. nov	Valid	Feist & McNamara	Late Devonian	Virgin Hills Formation	Australia	A member of Proetida, a species of Palpebralia.	
Palpebralina	Gen. et 3 sp. et comb. nov	Valid	Feist & McNamara	Late Devonian		Australia; France	A member of Proetida. The type species is Palpebralina pseudopalpebralis; genus also contains new species P. minor and P. ocellifer, as well as "Palpebralia" palpebralis globoculata Feist in Feist and Schindler, 1994 (raised by Feist and McNamara to the rank of a separate species Palpebralina globoculata) and "Palpebralia" latepalpebralis Feist in Feist and Schindler (1994).	
Paranomocarella dingmaoshanensis	Sp. nov	Valid	Lin et al.	Cambrian	Liudaogou Group	China	A polymerid trilobite belonging to the family Anomocarellidae, a species of Paranomocarella.	
Parvilichas	Gen. et sp. nov	Valid	Corbacho & Vela	Ordovician (Floian)	Fezouata Formation	Morocco	A member of Lichida belonging to the family Lichidae. The type species is Parvilichas marochii.	
Peltabellia glabra	Sp. nov	Valid	Fortey & Bruton	Early Ordovician	Kirtonryggen Formation	Norway	A bathyurid proetid, a species of Peltabellia.	
Pennarbedops	Gen. et comb. nov	Valid	Bignon & Crônier	Devonian (late Emsian)		France; Spain	An asteropygine phacopidan, a new genus for "Rhenops" babini Morzadec (1983). Genus also contains Pennarbedops circumapodemus (Smeenk, 1983). The genus Pennardbedops was considered to be a junior synonym of the genus Hollardops by Van Viersen & Kloc (2022).	
Phacops tamtertensis	Sp. nov	Valid	Crônier et al.	Devonian (Famennian)	'Argiles de Marhouma' Formation	Algeria	A member of Phacopidae.	
Phacops zeregensis	Sp. nov	Valid	Crônier et al.	Devonian (Famennian)	'Argiles de Marhouma' Formation	Algeria	A member of Phacopidae.	
Phaseolops? bobowensi	Sp. nov	Valid	Fortey & Bruton	Early Ordovician	Kirtonryggen Formation	Norway	A member of Proetidae, possibly a species of Phaseolops.	
Placosema qinghaiense	Sp. nov	Valid	Lin et al.	Cambrian	Liudaogou Group	China	A polymerid trilobite belonging to the family Catillicephalidae, a species of Placosema.	
Pliomerina tashanensis	sp nov	Valid	Lee	Late Ordovician	Xiazhen Formation	China	A pliomerid, a species of Pliomerina.	
Pteroparia extrema	Sp. nov	Valid	Feist & McNamara	Late Devonian	Virgin Hills Formation	Australia	A member of Proetida, a species of Pteroparia.	
Punka latissima	Sp. nov	Valid	Fortey & Bruton	Early Ordovician	Kirtonryggen Formation	Norway	A bathyurid proetid, a species of Punka.	
Raymondaspis? pingpong	Sp. nov	Valid	Fortey & Bruton	Early Ordovician	Kirtonryggen Formation	Norway	A styginid corynexochid, possibly a species of Raymondaspis.	
Remopleurides xiazhenensis	sp nov	Valid	Lee	Late Ordovician	Xiazhen Formation	China	A remopleurid, a species of Remopleurides.	
Rhenogriffides alborzensis	Sp. nov	Valid	Hahn, Müller & Aghababalou	Carboniferous (Tournaisian)	Mobarak Formation	Iran	A member of Phillipsiidae, a species of Rhenogriffides.	
Rudybole	Gen. et comb. et sp. nov	Valid	Feist & McNamara	Late Devonian		Australia; France	A member of Proetida. A new genus for "Drevermannia" brecciae Richter (1913); genus also contains "Drevermannia" adorfensis Richter (1913), "Drevermannia" nodannulata Richter (1913), "Palpebralia" nodannulata concava Feist in Feist and Schindler, 1994 (raised by Feist and McNamara to the rank of a separate species Rudybole concava) and a new species Rudybole depressa.	
Scopelochasmops mukranensis	Sp. nov	Valid	Krueger	Ordovician		Germany	A member of the family Pterygometopidae.	
Scopelochasmops praewrangeli	Sp. nov	Valid	Krueger	Ordovician		Europe	A member of the family Pterygometopidae.	
Shabanovia	Nom. nov	Valid	Doweld	Middle Cambrian		Russia	An alokistocarid; a replacement name for Furia Egorova and Shabanov (1987).	
Svalbardicurus	Gen. et sp. nov	Valid	Fortey & Bruton	Early Ordovician	Kirtonryggen Formation	Norway	A hystricurid aulacopleurid. The type species is Svalbardicurus delicatus.	
Tangshanaspis silveri	Sp. nov	Valid	Westrop	Late Cambrian (Furongian)	Signal Mountain Formation	United States	A member of Missisquoiidae, a species of Tangshanaspis.	
Tayanaspis	Gen. et sp. nov	Valid	Elicki & Geyer	Cambrian		Jordan	An ellipsocephaline ellipsocephalid. The type species is Tayanaspis bulbosus.	
Toxochasmops (Toxochasmops) luebzensis	Sp. nov	Valid	Krueger	Ordovician		Europe	A member of the family Pterygometopidae.	
Toxochasmops (Toxochasmops) praewesenbergensis	Sp. nov	Valid	Krueger	Ordovician		Europe	A member of the family Pterygometopidae.	
Trimerocephalus chopini	Sp nov	Valid	Kin & Błażejowski	Late Devonian (Early Famennian)		Poland	A phacopid, a species of Trimerocephalus.	
Uhaymiria	Gen. et sp. nov	Valid	Elicki & Geyer	Cambrian		Jordan	An ellipsocephaline ellipsocephalid. The type species is Uhaymiria glabra.	
Uromystrum drepanon	Sp. nov	Valid	Fortey & Bruton	Early Ordovician	Kirtonryggen Formation	Norway	A bathyurid proetid, a species of Uromystrum.	
Valdariops porkuniensis	Sp. nov	Valid	Krueger	Ordovician		Europe	A member of the family Pterygometopidae.	
Valdariops postnybiensis	Sp. nov	Valid	Krueger	Ordovician		Europe	A member of the family Pterygometopidae.	
Valdariops ruegensis	Sp. nov	Valid	Krueger	Ordovician		Europe	A member of the family Pterygometopidae.	
Valdariops scheffelae	Sp. nov	Valid	Krueger	Ordovician		Germany	A member of the family Pterygometopidae.	
Valdariops schneideri	Sp. nov	Valid	Krueger	Ordovician		Europe	A member of the family Pterygometopidae.	
Valdariops vierradensis	Sp. nov	Valid	Krueger	Ordovician		Europe	A member of the family Pterygometopidae.	
Vietnamia yushanensis	sp nov	Valid	Lee	Late Ordovician	Xiazhen Formation	China	A calymenid, a species of Vietnamia.	
Zhifangia damghanensis	Sp. nov	Valid	Hahn, Müller & Aghababalou	Carboniferous (Tournaisian)	Mobarak Formation	Iran	A member of Proetidae. Originally described as a species of Zhifangia; subsequently transferred to the genus Pudoproetus by Müller & Hahn (2015).	

== Others ==
Name	Novelty	Status	Authors	Age	Unit	Location	Notes	Images
Adelophthalmus piussii	Sp. nov	Valid	Lamsdell, Simonetto & Selden	Late Carboniferous		Italy	A eurypterid, a species of Adelophthalmus.	
Aglaspella sanduensis	Sp. nov	Valid	Lerosey-Aubril, Ortega-Hernández & Zhu	Cambrian (Furongian)	Sandu Formation	China	A member of Aglaspidida, a species of Aglaspella.	
Arthroaspis	Gen. et sp. nov	Valid	Stein et al.	Cambrian (Montezuman)	Sirius Passet Lagerstätte	Greenland	An arthropod of uncertain phylogenetic placement, probably a relative of trilobites. The type species is Arthroaspis bergstroemi.	
Austromarrella	Gen. et sp.	Valid	Haug et al.	Cambrian (Late Templetonian to Early Floran)	Monastery Creek Phosphorite Formation	Australia	A marrellomorph. The type species is Austromarrella klausmuelleri.	
Dvulikiaspis	Gen. et comb. nov	Valid	Marshall et al.	Early Devonian (Lochkovian)		Russia	A member of Chasmataspidida, a new genus for "Tylopterella" menneri (initially thought to be a eurypterid).	
Hesselbonia	Gen. et comb. nov	Valid	Lerosey-Aubril, Ortega-Hernández & Zhu	Late Cambrian	St Lawrence Formation	United States	A member of Aglaspidida, a new genus for "Aglaspella" eatoni.	
Kachinophilus	Gen. et sp. nov	Valid	Bonato, Edgecombe & Minelli	Late Cretaceous (earliest Cenomanian)		Myanmar	A geophilomorph centipede found in Burmese amber. The type species is Kachinophilus pereirai.	
Kasibelinurus yueya	Sp. nov	Valid	Lamsdell, Xue & Selden	Early Devonian (Lochkovian)	Xiaxishancun Formation	China	Originally classified as a kasibelinurid xiphosuran and a species of Kasibelinurus; Selden, Lamsdell & Qi (2015) reinterpreted it as a chelicerate belonging to the lineage that branched from the main euchelicerate lineage prior to the divergence of Eurypterida, Arachnida and Chasmataspidida and made it the type species of a separate genus Houia.	
Kootenichela	Gen. et sp. nov	Valid	Legg	Middle Cambrian	Stephen Formation	Canada	A member of paraphyletic "Megacheira" closely related to Worthenella. The type species is Kootenichela deppi. Later study considered this species to be chimera.	
Loricicaris	Gen. et sp. nov	Valid	Legg & Caron	Cambrian	Burgess Shale	Canada	A basal, bivalved arthropod. The type species is Loricicaris spinocaudatus.	
Nahlyostaspis	Gen. et sp. nov	Valid	Marshall et al.	Early Devonian (Lochkovian)		Russia	A member of Chasmataspidida. The type species is Nahlyostaspis bergstroemi.	
Nereocaris briggsi	Sp. nov	Valid	Legg & Caron	Cambrian	Burgess Shale	Canada	A basal, bivalved arthropod; a species of Nereocaris.	
Norikeya	Gen. et sp. nov	Valid	Tanaka, Siveter & Williams	Early Devonian		Japan	A bivalved arthropod of uncertain phylogenetic placement. The type species is Norikeya onoi.	
Palaeomarachne	Gen. et sp. nov	Valid	Rudkin et al.	Late Ordovician	William Lake Konservat-Lagerstätte	Canada	A sea spider. The type species is Palaeomarachne granulata.	
Paraeurypterus	Gen. et sp. nov	Valid	Lamsdell, Hoşgör & Selden	Upper Ordovician	Şort Tepe Formation	Turkey	A eurypterid. The type species is Paraeurypterus anatoliensis.	
Parastemmiulus	Gen. et sp. nov	Valid	Riquelme et al.	Miocene		Mexico	A stemmiulid millipede. The type species is Parastemmiulus elektron.	
Pentapantopus	Gen. et sp. nov	Valid	Kühl, Poschmann & Rust	Early Devonian		Germany	A sea spider. The type species is Pentapantopus vogteli.	
Pentlandopterus	Gen. et comb. nov	Valid	Lamsdell, Hoşgör & Selden	Silurian		United Kingdom	A eurypterid; a new genus for "Eurypterus" minor Laurie (1899).	
Sinoleperditia (Sinoleperditia) tongvaiensis	Sp. nov	Valid	Wang	Early Devonian	Khao Loc Formation	Vietnam	A member of Leperditicopida (a group of arthropods of uncertain affinities, classified as ostracods or excluded from this group by different authors), a species of Sinoleperditia.	
Skrytyaspis	Gen. et sp. nov	Valid	Marshall et al.	Early Devonian (Lochkovian)		Russia	A member of Chasmataspidida. The type species is Skrytyaspis andersoni.	
Strobilopterus proteus	Sp. nov	Valid	Lamsdell & Selden	Devonian (Pragian)	Beartooth Butte Formation	United States	A eurypterid, a species of Strobilopterus.	
Tremaglaspis vanroyi	Sp. nov	Valid	Lerosey-Aubril et al.	Cambrian (Guzhangian)	Weeks Formation	United States	A member of Aglaspidida, a species of Tremaglaspis.	
