= Coral crab =

Coral crabs are true crabs (Brachyura) in any of the genera closely associated with coral reefs:

- Carpilius, a genus in the family Carpiliidae
- Domecia in the superfamily Trapeziodea
- Quadrella in the superfamily Trapeziidae
- Trapezia in the superfamily Trapeziodea
