= Quadrella =

Quadrella may refer to:

- Quadrella (crab), a genus of crabs in the family Trapeziidae
- Quadrella (plant), a genus of plants in the family Capparaceae
- Quadrella (sheep breed), an Italian breed of sheep
