= Trapezia intermedia =

Scientific classification
- Kingdom: Animalia
- Phylum: Arthropoda
- Clade: Pancrustacea
- Class: Malacostraca
- Order: Decapoda
- Suborder: Pleocyemata
- Infraorder: Brachyura
- Family: Trapeziidae
- Genus: Trapezia
- Species: T. intermedia

Binomial name
- Trapezia intermedia Miers, 1886

Species of Guard crabs

Trapezia intermedia, also known as the common guard crab in Hawai'i, is a species of guard crabs in the family Trapeziidae.

== Description ==
Trapezia intermedia is about 1.5 cm (0.59 in) in size and lives in the central Pacific Ocean. It has light brown and orange spotting over its body with red dots and blue eyes. These crabs are very protective of their home which can be found in between branches of coral which they hide among when they feel threatened.

== Habitat ==
It lives in coral reef areas and is commonly found in branching stony corals, especially species of Pocillopora. It defends its coral host from coral eating species, such as the crown-of-thorns seastar. In return, the coral host provides it with food and shelter.

== Behavior ==
It shows strong aggression toward other crabs of the same sex as this behavior helps maintain pairs and reflects its reliance on its coral host. However, it does not show aggression to the opposite sex. It also use its claws to remove debris and harmful organisms from the coral, helping keep its host healthy.
