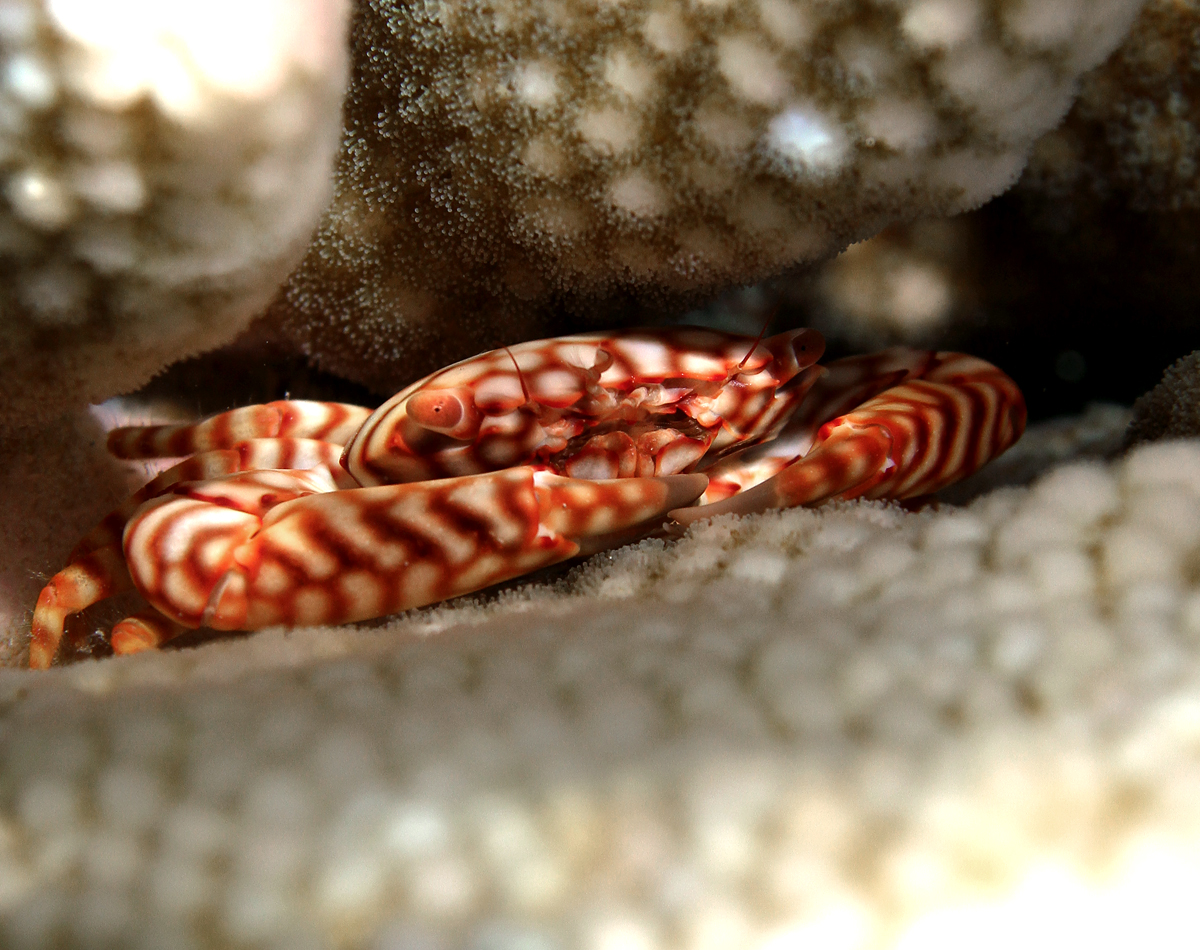

Scientific classification
- Kingdom: Animalia
- Phylum: Arthropoda
- Class: Malacostraca
- Order: Decapoda
- Suborder: Pleocyemata
- Infraorder: Brachyura
- Family: Trapeziidae
- Genus: Trapezia
- Species: T. flavopunctata

Binomial name
- Trapezia flavopunctata (Eydoux & Souleyet, 1842)

= Trapezia flavopunctata =

Species of guard crabs

Trapezia flavopunctata is a species of guard crabs in the family Trapeziidae.
