= Trapezia rufopunctata =

- Trapezia rufopunctata in Polynesia

Scientific classification
- Kingdom: Animalia
- Phylum: Arthropoda
- Clade: Pancrustacea
- Class: Malacostraca
- Order: Decapoda
- Suborder: Pleocyemata
- Infraorder: Brachyura
- Family: Trapeziidae
- Genus: Trapezia
- Species: T. rufopunctata

Binomial name
- Trapezia rufopunctata (Herbst, 1799)

Synonyms
- Cancer rufopunctata Herbst, 1799; Grapsillus maculatus MacLeay, 1838; Quadrella rufopunctata Chen, 1933; Trapezia acutifrons A. Milne-Edwards, 1867; Trapezia rufopunctata f. typica Bouvier, 1915; Trapezia wardi

Species of crustacean

Trapezia rufopunctata is a species of guard crabs in the family Trapeziidae.

== Description ==
Trapezia rufopunctata, also known as the commensal crab, can reach the size of about 5 cm in width. They are considered true crabs, with 4 pairs of walking legs and a pair of proportionally large and long, flattened clawed legs (chelipeds).

The trapezoidal carapace has a unique mottled pattern, with around 100 to 200 reddish or orange spots on a white or pink background, earning it the common name of the “rust spotted guard crab.” Their appearance is believed to help it camouflage within the colorful corals in which it resides. Its eyes, however, are a contrasting shade of green. Trapezia rufopunctata uses drag-powered swimming to move around. This guard crab, similar to other members of the family, lives symbiotically in association with corals.

Behaviorally, this species avoids confrontation, quickly retreating into coral branches when approached while holding its claws up defensively.

These crabs are gonochoric and their mating behavior includes a precopulatory courting ritual which is often instigated through olfactory or tactile cues. They reproduce sexually, and the resulting fertilized eggs are carried by the female. The mating pair typically occupies the same coral colony together afterward. The eggs hatch into planktonic larvae before growing into the distinctive, aforementioned adult characteristics.

== Distribution and habitat ==
This species is widespread in the Indo-Pacific, Maldives, and Polynesia. It has specifically been widely seen and photographed near the Great Barrier Reef in Australia and Bali, Indonesia. They have been found as far west as Hawaii, as east as eastern Africa, as north as southern Japan, and as south as South Africa. Trapezia rufopunctata inhabits coastal reefs and lagoons, mostly due to their symbiotic relationship with corals. Typically, that is shallow water at a depth of 0–30 meters, with sea surface temperatures ranging from 20–36 °C (68–97 °F).

== Symbiosis ==
Trapezia rufopunctata specifically lives on the hard corals of the genus Stylophora and Pocillopora, hiding deep within the coral branches. Single mating pairs of the species are often found to occupy a coral colony together, with larger corals able to host up to 5 different pairs of Trapezia species and smaller corals only able to host one pair.

Their mutualistic relationship consists of feeding on coral tissue (polyps) and mucus, and defending the corals from predators, such as the coral-eating starfish Acanthaster planci. Trapezia rufopunctata have also been found to protect corals against the mucus of the vermetid snail, Dendropoma maximum. These sessile snails extrude a mucous net for feeding, which negatively affects both the coral growth and morphology, reducing their rate of survival.

Trapezia rufopunctata have been observed cleaning the corals of vermetid mucus while feeding on the coral itself. They feed by first massaging the coral tissue with their legs, which produces a slimy mucus that they collect via the hairs on their legs, sequentially passing it to its mouth. Although there are certain sea stars they cannot deter (such as Culcita novaeguineae), these crabs are still widely known and widely recognized for increasing the survival of juvenile populations of host corals.

They often work in conjunction with other mutualistic organisms, as corals need a diverse variety of sizes and morphologies of endosymbionts to fend off predation. The functional diversity within the genus minimizes any gaps in the protection of the coral, which a singular species of Trapezia cannot achieve. Although there are multiple studies on the impact of the Trapezia family overall on coral health, there is much work to be done on Trapezia rufopunctata specifically.

Overall, this mutualism both stabilizes and increases biodiversity in the ecosystem, as well as positively affecting coral reef demography. This symbiotic relationship has also been shown to increase the resistance of both the crab and coral to external stressors unrelated to their relationship.

== In Captivity ==
This species of Trapezia is a favorite among many aquarists, as they help keep the corals clean from detritus and waste, while also protecting the fragile coral from harmful predators. Additionally, they can be kept in aquariums if provided an adequate supply of the preferred Pocillopora or Acropora corals, although their diet can be supplemented by fish food if needed.
