= Eomonorachus =

Scientific classification
- Kingdom: Animalia
- Phylum: Arthropoda
- Clade: †Artiopoda
- Class: †Trilobita
- Order: †Phacopida
- Family: †Pterygometopidae
- Genus: †Eomonorachus; Delo, 1935

Extinct genus of trilobites

Eomonorachus is a genus of trilobites in the order Phacopida, that existed during the middle Ordovician in what is now the United States. It was described by Delo in 1935, and the type species is Eomonorachus intermedius, which was originally described under the genus Dalmanites by Walcott in 1877. It also contains the species Eomonorachus divaricatus, which was originally assigned to Calliops by Frederickson in 1964, and was later moved to Estoniops by Shaw in 1974, before being reassessed under its current genus by Ludvigsen in 1978. The type locality was the Decorah Formation in Minnesota.
