= Calyptaulax =

Scientific classification
- Kingdom: Animalia
- Phylum: Arthropoda
- Clade: †Artiopoda
- Class: †Trilobita
- Order: †Phacopida
- Family: †Pterygometopidae
- Genus: †Calyptaulax; Cooper, 1930

Extinct genus of trilobites

Calyptaulax is a genus of trilobites in the order Phacopida that existed during the middle and upper Ordovician in what is now the U.S. states of New York, Pennsylvania, Oklahoma, Illinois, Missouri, Virginia, Vermont, Nevada, Iowa, Wisconsin, Kentucky, and Iowa, as well as the Canadian provinces of Ontario, Newfoundland and Labrador, Quebec, and the territory of Nunavut. Other countries Calyptaulax fossils are known from include Ireland, Norway, Russia, and the United Kingdom.

== Type species ==
By original designation; Calyptaulax glabella Cooper, 1930: pp. 388 - 389, pl. 5, figs. 9 - 11. From the Matapedia Group (Ashgill), Perce, Quebec, Canada.

=== Other species ===
- Calyptaulax annulata Raymond, 1905
- Calyptaulax callicephala Hall, 1847
- Calyptaulax callirachis Cooper, 1953
- Calyptaulax cornwalli Ross, Jr. and Barnes, 1967
- Calyptaulax holstonensis Raymond, 1925
- Calyptaulax incepta Whittington, 1965
- Calyptaulax norvegicus Stormer, 1945
- Calyptaulax sillimani Roy, 1941
- Calyptaulax strasburgensis Ulrich and Delo, 1940
