= Elasmaspis =

Scientific classification
- Domain: Eukaryota
- Kingdom: Animalia
- Phylum: Arthropoda
- Class: †Trilobita
- Order: †Phacopida
- Family: †Pterygometopidae
- Genus: †Elasmaspis; Kramarenko, 1957

Elasmaspis is a trilobite in the order Phacopida, that existed during the upper Ordovician in what is now Russia. It was described by Kramarenko in 1957, and the type species is Elasmaspis speciosa. The type locality was the Dzheron Formation in Siberia.
