= Uralops =

Scientific classification
- Domain: Eukaryota
- Kingdom: Animalia
- Phylum: Arthropoda
- Class: †Trilobita
- Order: †Phacopida
- Family: †Pterygometopidae
- Genus: †Uralops; Antsygin, 1970

Extinct genus of trilobites

Uralops is an extinct genus of trilobite in the family Pterygometopidae.
