= Denella =

Scientific classification
- Domain: Eukaryota
- Kingdom: Animalia
- Phylum: Arthropoda
- Class: †Trilobita
- Order: †Phacopida
- Family: †Pterygometopidae
- Genus: †Denella; Ludvigsen & Chatterton, 1982

Extinct genus of trilobites

Denella is a trilobite in the order Phacopida, that existed during the upper Ordovician in what is now Canada. It was described by Ludvigsen and Chatterton in 1982, and the type species is Denella cumera. The type locality was the Whittaker Formation in the Northwest Territories.
