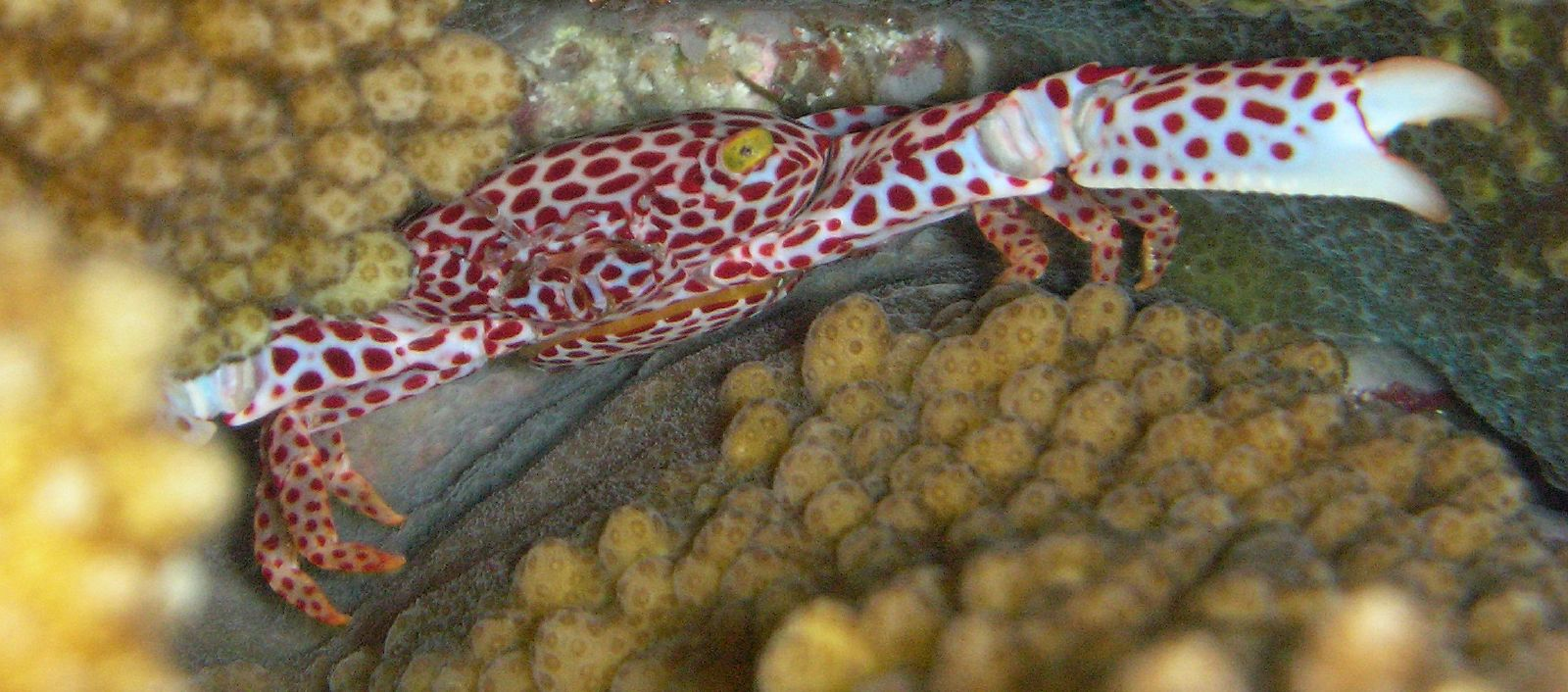
- Trapezia tigrina (Trapeziidae)

Scientific classification
- Kingdom: Animalia
- Phylum: Arthropoda
- Class: Malacostraca
- Order: Decapoda
- Suborder: Pleocyemata
- Infraorder: Brachyura
- Section: Eubrachyura
- Subsection: Heterotremata
- Superfamily: Trapezioidea; Miers, 1886

Families
- See text

= Trapezioidea =

Trapezioidea Temporal range: Eocene–Recent

Superfamily of crabs

Trapezioidea is a superfamily of crabs. Its members live symbiotically with corals and have a fossil record stretching back to the Eocene.

== Families ==
The World Register of Marine Species lists the following families:

- Calocarcinidae Števčić, 2005
- Domeciidae Ortmann, 1893
- Ectaesthesiidae Ng, Ahyong & Castro, 2023
- Tetraliidae Castro, Ng & Ahyong, 2004
- Trapeziidae Miers, 1886
- † Vicetitrapeziidae Beschin, Busulini & Tessier, 2021
