= Upplandiops =

Upplandiops Temporal range: Darriwilian

Scientific classification
- Domain: Eukaryota
- Kingdom: Animalia
- Phylum: Arthropoda
- Class: †Trilobita
- Order: †Phacopida
- Family: †Pterygometopidae
- Genus: †Upplandiops; Jaanusson & Ramskold, 1993
- Species: †U. calvus

Binomial name
- †Upplandiops calvus Jaanusson & Ramsköld, 1993

Extinct genus of trilobites

Upplandiops is an extinct genus of trilobite in the family Pterygometopidae. There is one described species in Upplandiops, U. calvus.
