= Isalaux =

Scientific classification
- Domain: Eukaryota
- Kingdom: Animalia
- Phylum: Arthropoda
- Class: †Trilobita
- Order: †Phacopida
- Family: †Pterygometopidae
- Genus: †Isalaux; Frederickson & Pollack, 1952

Species
- Isalaux canonensis Frederickson & Pollack, 1952 (type)

Extinct genus of trilobites

Isalaux is a trilobite in the order Phacopida (family Pterygometopidae), that existed during the upper Ordovician in what is now the United States. It was described by Frederickson and Pollack in 1952, and the type species is Isalaux canonensis. The type locality was the Harding Formation in Colorado.
