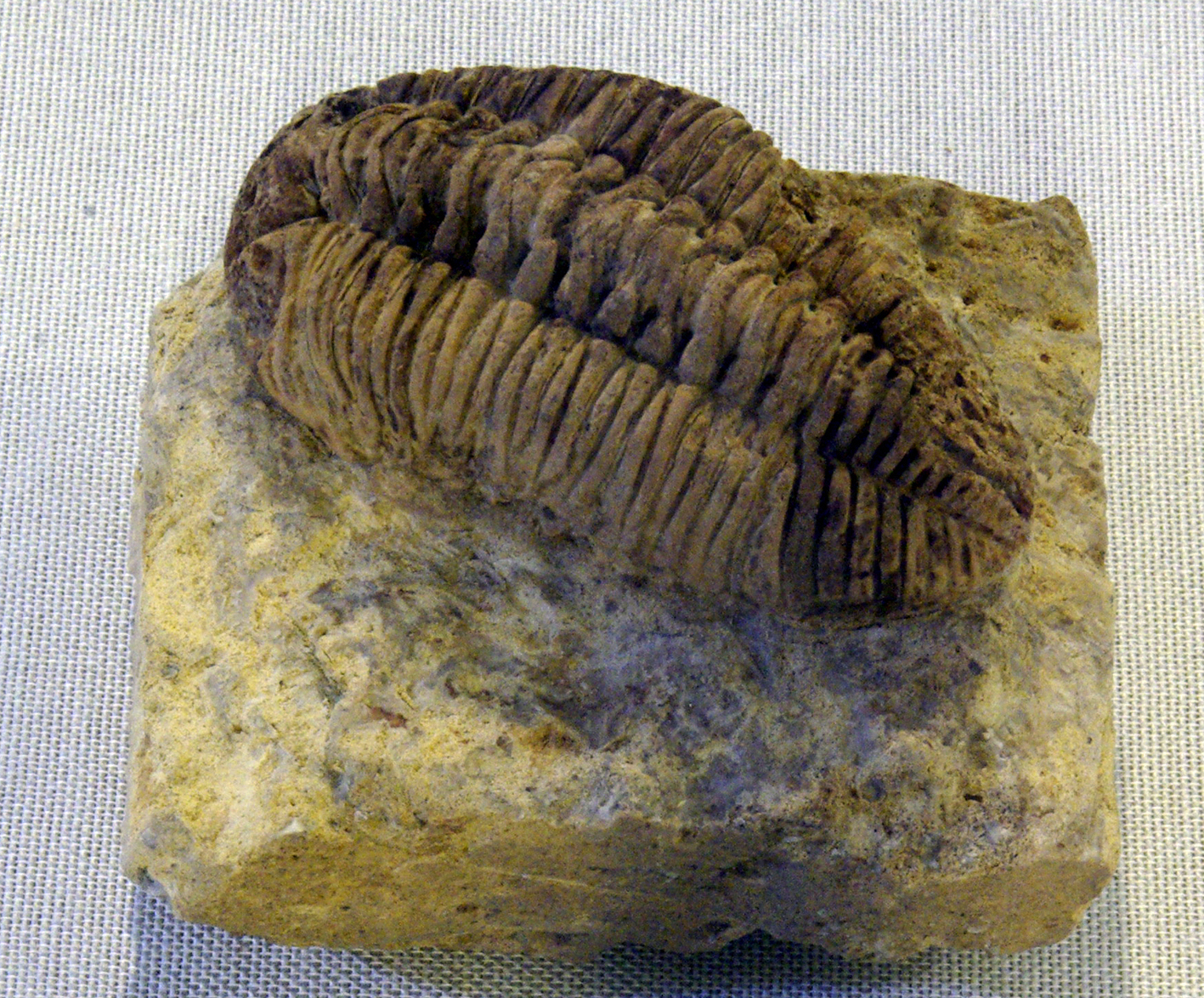
- Chasmops sp.

Scientific classification
- Domain: Eukaryota
- Kingdom: Animalia
- Phylum: Arthropoda
- Class: †Trilobita
- Order: †Phacopida
- Family: †Pterygometopidae
- Genus: †Chasmops; McCoy, 1849

= Chasmops =

Genus of trilobites

Chasmops is a trilobite in the order Phacopida that existed during the upper Ordovician in what is now Estonia. It was described by McCoy in 1849, and the type species is Chasmops odini, which was originally described under the genus Calymene by Eichwald in 1840. It also contains the species C. maxima.
