= Forni Dolostone =

Geological formation in northeastern Italy

- Stratigraphic range: Norian (Alaunian); ~216–212 Ma
- Type: Geological formation

Lithology
- Primary: Dolomite
- Other: Marl

Location
- Coordinates: 46.4°N 12.6°E
- Approximate paleocoordinates: 26.5°N 16.0°E
- Region: Friuli-Venezia Giulia
- Country: Italy

Type section
- Named for: Forni di Sopra
- Forni Dolostone (Italy)

The Forni Dolostone, also known as the Dolomia di Forni, is a Late Triassic (Norian, or Alaunian in the local biochronology) dolomite geological formation in northeastern Italy. The formation was deposited in a lagoonal to shallow marine environment.

== Description ==
It represents deposition in an anoxic marine basin whose maximum depth was about 400 metres (1,300 ft), and was surrounded by the shallow water carbonate platform of the Dolomia Principale Formation. The Dolomia di Forni is composed mainly of dark, often cherty, well-bedded dolostone that is frequently thinly laminated and sometimes slumped. Thicker laminae are graded and represent distal turbidites. The basinal facies preserving the tetrapod remains are composed mainly of distal turbidites and carbonate mud deposited by fallout.

== Fossil content ==
The following fossils have been reported from the formation:

=== Pterosaurs ===
Pterosaurs of the Forni Dolostone
Genus	Species	Presence	Notes	Images
Austriadactylus	A. cristatus			
Carniadactylus	E. rosenfeldi		Bergamodactylus wildi is a probable junior synonym.	
Preondactylus	P. buffarinii	Found near a small church in the Preone Valley of Udine Province	Found in a gastric pellet	
Seazzadactylus	S. venieri			

=== Other reptiles ===
Miscellaneous reptiles of the Forni Dolostone
Genus	Species	Presence	Notes	Images
Drepanosaurus	?D. unguicaudatus			
"Langobardisaurus"	"L." rossii		A specimen now regarded as a lepidosauromorph outside of the genus Langobardisaurus	
Langobardisaurus	L. tonelloi (a synonym of L. pandolfii)		Two specimens	
Megalancosaurus	M. preonensis			
Simonettoia	S. tilaventina	Forchiar Brook	A small specimen first regarded as a juvenile Langobardisaurus	

=== Fish ===
- Pseudodalatias barnstonensis
- Sargodon tomicus
- Italopterus martinisi
- ?Eopholidophorus forojuliensis
- Holophagus sp.
- Saurichthys sp.

=== Arachnids ===
- Friularachne rigoi

=== Crustaceans ===
- Acanthochirana triassica
- Antrimpos colettoi
- A. noricus
- Archaeopalinurus levis
- Dusa denticulata
- D. longipes
- Microcaris minuta
- Pseudocoleia mazzolenii
- Rosenfeldia triassica
- Glaessnericaris sp.
- Glyphea sp.

=== Flora ===
- Brachyphyllum sp.
- Coniferales indet.
