= Friularachne =

Friularachne Temporal range: Late Triassic ~215–208 Ma

Scientific classification
- Domain: Eukaryota
- Kingdom: Animalia
- Phylum: Arthropoda
- Subphylum: Chelicerata
- Class: Arachnida
- Order: Araneae
- Infraorder: Mygalomorphae
- Genus: †Friularachne; Dalla Vecchia & Selden, 2013
- Species: †F. rigoi

Binomial name
- †Friularachne rigoi Dalla Vecchia & Selden 2013

Extinct genus of spiders

Friularachne is an extinct genus of mygalomorph spider which lived during the Late Triassic period in Italy. The genus was described in 2013 by Fabio M. Dalla Vecchia and Paul A. Selden, and contains the sole species Friularachne rigoi, found in the Dolomia di Forni Formation. It is possibly a member of the Atypoidea.
