= Kirtonryggen Formation =

Geologic formation in Norway

- Stratigraphic range: Ordovician
- Type: Formation

Location
- Region: Svalbard
- Country: Norway

The Kirtonryggen Formation is a fossil-bearing geologic formation in Svalbard, Norway. The mountain that gives its name to this formation is named for Christopher John Blisset Kirton, who was killed in a scree fall during an expedition to Svalbard in 1958.

== See also ==
- List of fossiliferous stratigraphic units in Norway

== Sources ==
- Various Contributors to the Paleobiology Database. "Fossilworks: Gateway to the Paleobiology Database". Archived from the original on 19 August 2022.
