= Bolbochasmops =

Scientific classification
- Domain: Eukaryota
- Kingdom: Animalia
- Phylum: Arthropoda
- Class: †Trilobita
- Order: †Phacopida
- Family: †Pterygometopidae
- Genus: †Bolbochasmops; McNamara, 1980

Extinct genus of trilobites

Bolbochasmops is a genus of trilobite in the order Phacopida, which existed in what is now Estonia. It was described by McNamara in 1980, and the type species is Bolbochasmops emarginata, which was originally described as Chasmops bucculenta, and later as Phacops bucculenta by Schmidt in 1881.
