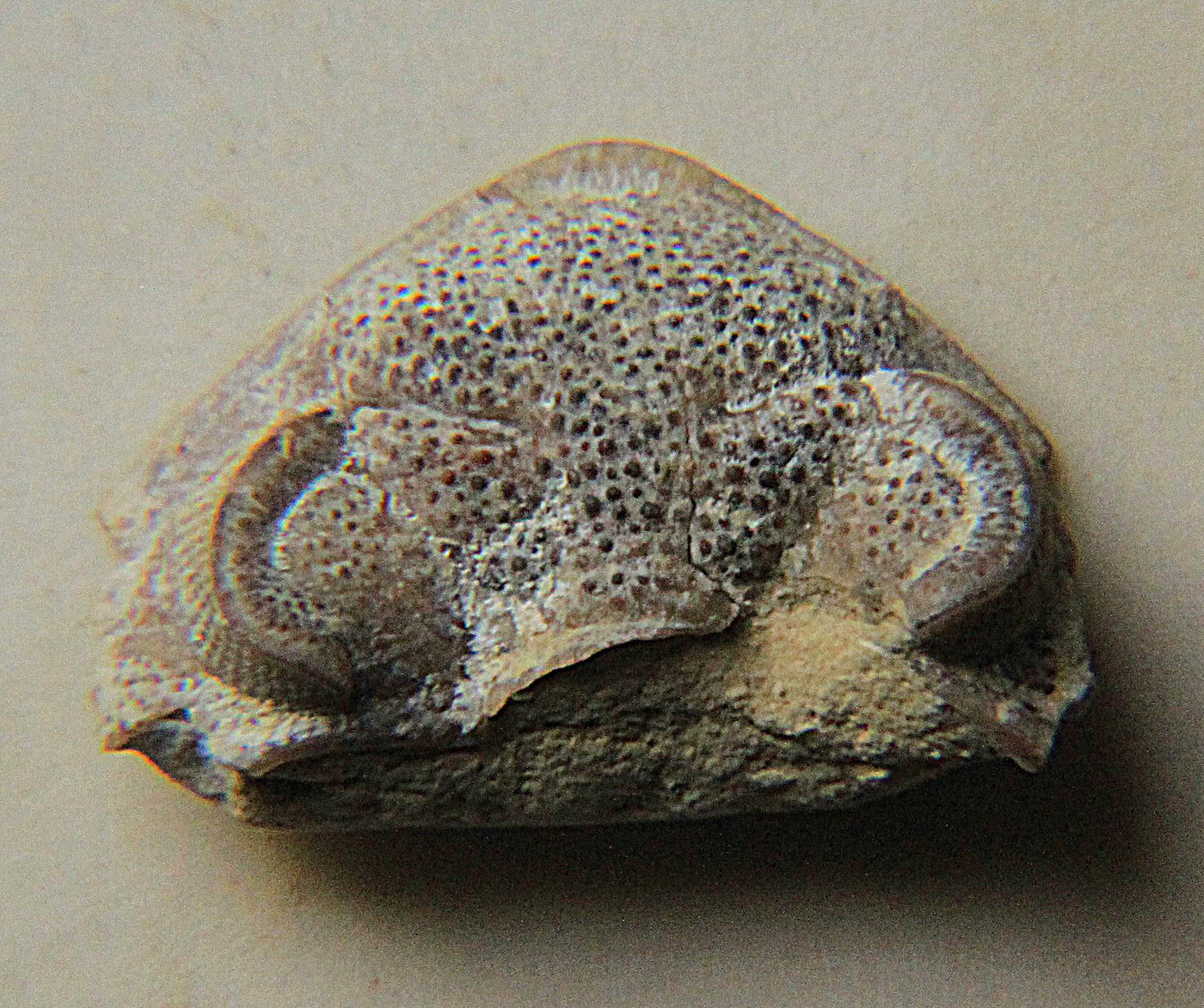
- Calliops armatus dorsal view of the cephalon, collected from the Bromide Formation, Sandbian

Scientific classification
- Kingdom: Animalia
- Phylum: Arthropoda
- Clade: †Artiopoda
- Class: †Trilobita
- Order: †Phacopida
- Suborder: †Phacopina
- Superfamily: †Phacopoidea
- Family: †Pterygometopidae; Reed, 1905

Subfamilies
- Pterigometopinae Reed, 1905; Chasmopinae Pillet, 1954; Eomonorachinae Pillet, 1954; Monorachinae Kramarenko, 1952

= Pterygometopidae =

Pterygometopidae Temporal range: Floian–Sheinwoodian

The Pterygometopidae are a family of trilobites, that is known from the Floian to the Katian (Ordovician), and reappears from the Telychian to the Sheinwoodian (Silurian). As part of the Phacopina suborder, its members have schizochroal eyes.

== Distribution ==
The Pterygometopinae may be exclusive to Baltica and are known from the Floian to the Upper Katian with 49 species in 14 genera. The 71 species from 8 genera belonging to the Eomonorachinae occur mostly in Laurentia from the Floian. One genus, Podowrinella, is known from the Silurian, and may be the sister taxon of the Phacopidae. 50 species in 8 genera have been assigned to the Chasmopinae. They are exclusive to Baltica from the Darriwilian to the Sandbian. The subfamily spread to Avalonia and Laurentia in the Katian, at the end of which they became extinct. 32 species of Monorachinae in 6 genera occurred on the paleocontinent Siberia, now parts of northeastern Russia and of Alaska, from the Sandbian to the Upper Katian.

== Genera ==
The following genera are assigned to the Pterygometopidae:

- Achatella
- Bolbochasmops
- Calliops
- Calyptaulax
- Carinopyge
- Ceratevenkaspis
- Chasmops
- Denella
- Elasmaspis
- Eomonorachus
- Estoniops
- Evenkaspis
- Ingriops
- Isalaux
- Isalauxina
- Keilapyge
- Liocnemis
- Monorakos
- Oculichasmops
- Oelandiops
- Parevenkaspis
- Podowrinella
- Pterygometopus
- Rollmops
- Ruegenometopus
- Sceptaspis
- Schmidtops
- Scopelochasmops
- Toxochasmops
- Tricopelta
- Truncatometopus
- Upplandiops
- Uralops
- Valdariops
- Vironiaspis
- Volkops
- Yanhaoia
