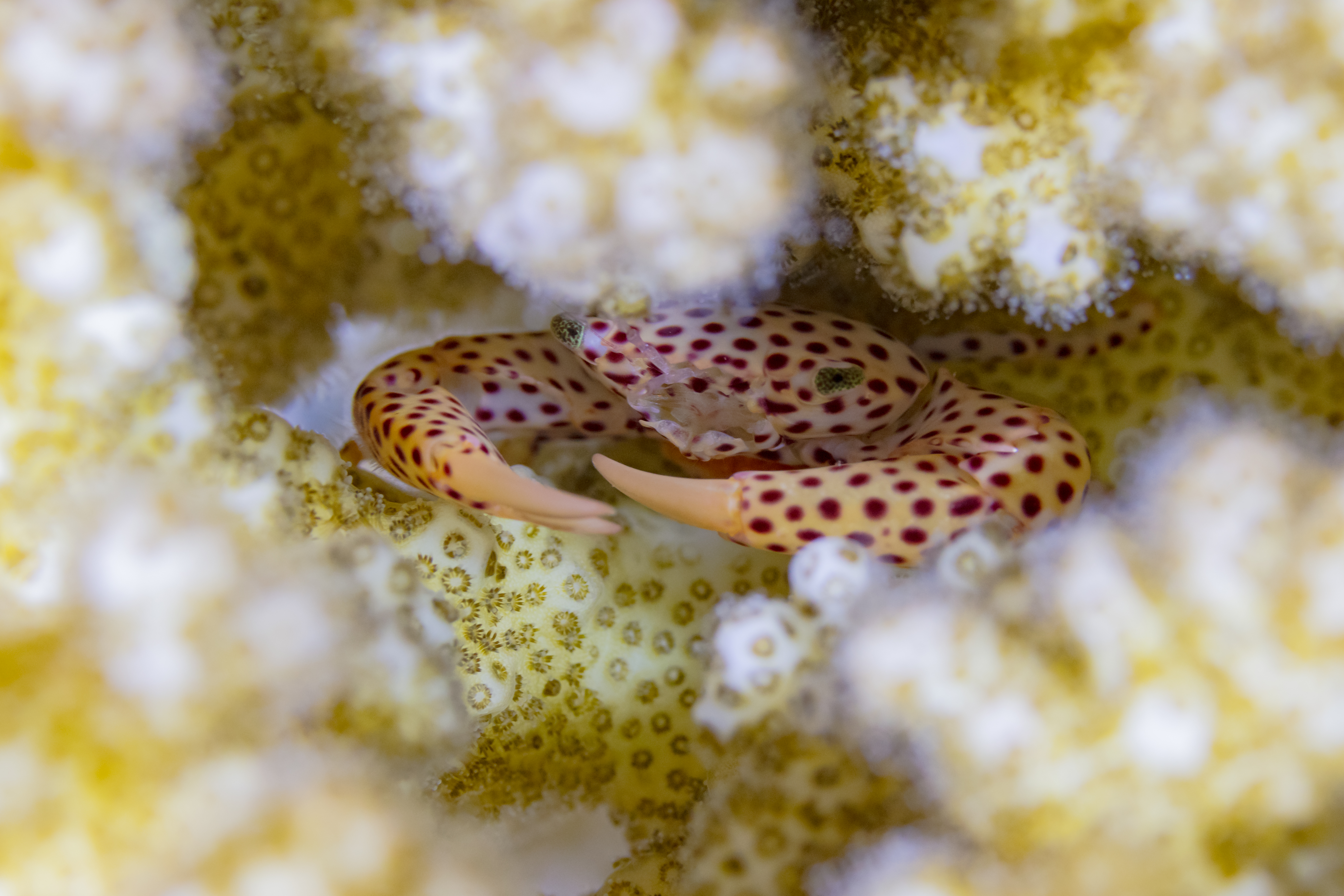

Scientific classification
- Kingdom: Animalia
- Phylum: Arthropoda
- Class: Malacostraca
- Order: Decapoda
- Suborder: Pleocyemata
- Infraorder: Brachyura
- Family: Trapeziidae
- Genus: Trapezia
- Species: T. tigrina

Binomial name
- Trapezia tigrina Eydoux & Souleyet, 1842

Synonyms
- Trapezia danae Ward, 1939; Trapezia danai Ward, 1939; Trapezia punctata Coulon, 1864; Trapezia wardi Serène, 1971

= Trapezia tigrina =

Species of crab

Trapezia tigrina is a species of guard crab in the family Trapeziidae. The species was described in 1842 by Joseph Fortuné Théodore Eydoux and Louis François Auguste Souleyet. A common name for the species is red-spotted guard crab. It is known for its symbiotic relationship with corals, and can be distinguished by its vibrant red spots and flattened body.

== Description ==
The red-spotted guard crab's exoskeleton can range between cream and pink and can be spotted with up to 150 red spots. It has 6 small teeth between its eyes, and the lower half of its pincers is smooth. The red-spotted guard crab can grow between 1.5 and 2.5 cm (0.6 and 1.0 in) and has a carapace width of up to 1.5 cm (0.6 in). Reproduction is sexual, but sperm transfer is indirect. It usually lives in solitude or in small groups, and mating often involves courtship rituals.

== Distribution and habitat ==
This coral-associated crab is native to the Indo-Pacific, including Hawai'i, East Africa, the Red Sea, Japan, Indonesia, and the Philippines. It inhabits shallow coral reefs between branching corals, where it develops a mutualistic relationship by defending the coral from predators in exchange for shelter. Trapezia tigrina can be found at a depth between 1 and 90 m (3.3 and 295.3 ft).
