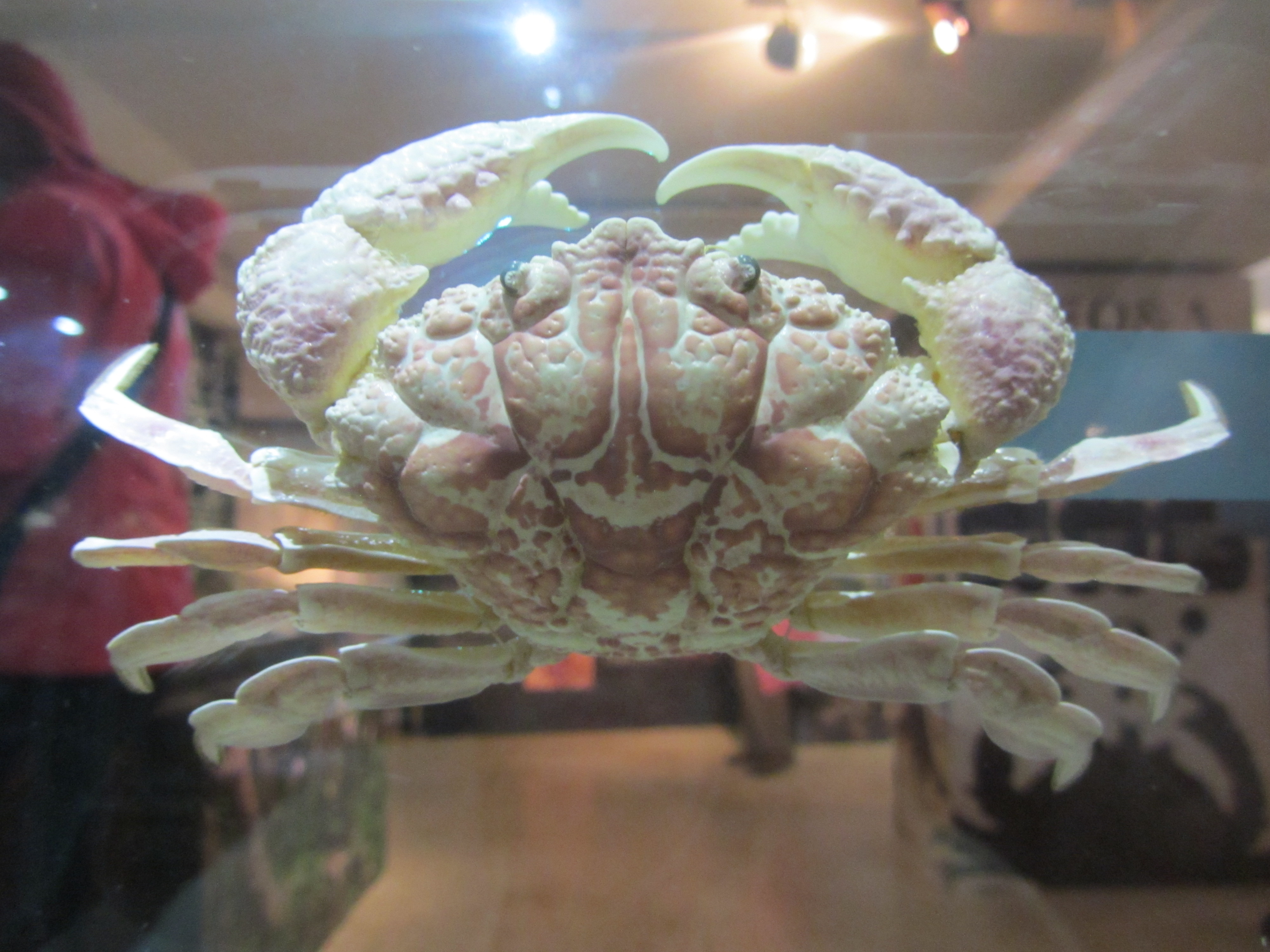
- Demania cultripes

Scientific classification
- Domain: Eukaryota
- Kingdom: Animalia
- Phylum: Arthropoda
- Class: Malacostraca
- Order: Decapoda
- Suborder: Pleocyemata
- Infraorder: Brachyura
- Family: Xanthidae
- Subfamily: Xanthinae
- Genus: Demania; Laurie, 1906

= Demania =

Genus of crabs

Demania is a genus of crabs in the family Xanthidae, containing the following species:

- †Demania ahramensis Yazdi, Bahrami, Abbasi, Sadeghi & Vega, 2013
- Demania alcocki Deb, 1987
- Demania armadillus (Herbst, 1790)
- Demania baccalipes (Alcock, 1898)
- †Demania chayiensis (Hu, 1981)
- Demania crosnieri Serene, 1984
- Demania cultripes (Alcock, 1898)
- Demania garthi Guinot & Richer de Forges, 1981
- Demania intermedia Guinot, 1969
- Demania japonica Guinot, 1977
- Demania mortenseni (Odhner, 1925)
- †Demania pilipinas Karasawa & Kato in Karasawa, Kato, Maac-Aguilar, Kurihara, Hayashi & Hagino, 2008
- Demania reynaudii (H. Milne Edwards, 1834)
- Demania rotundata Serene, 1969
- Demania scaberrima (Walker, 1887)
- Demania serenei Guinot & Richer de Forges, 1981
- Demania splendida Laurie, 1906
- Demania toxica Garth, 1971
- Demania unispinosa Chen & Ng, 1999
- Demania wardi Garth & Ng, 1985

Many species are known to be toxic to humans and domestic animals.
