= Quadrella (sheep breed) =

Italian breed of sheep

- Conservation status: FAO (2007): not at risk; DAD-IS (2026): at risk/critical
- Other names: Spagnola Arianese
- Country of origin: Italy
- Distribution: Provinces of Avellino, Benevento
- Use: triple-purpose: meat, milk, wool

Traits
- Weight: Male: 90 kg; Female: 65 kg
- Height: Male: 85 cm; Female: 65 cm
- Wool colour: white
- Face colour: white

The Quadrella is an Italian breed of domestic sheep. It is distributed principally in the provinces of Avellino and Benevento in Campania, in southern Italy. It is a gravely endangered breed, with fewer than a hundred head. It is associated with the comune of Ariano Irpino, and may also be known as the Spagnola Arianese.

== History ==
The Quadrella derives from cross-breeding of the local Pagliarola or Indigena population of the Abruzzo, Campania and Molise regions of southern Italy with Gentile di Puglia stock; this affected only the qualities of the wool. Subsequently there was further cross-breeding with stock of the Appenninica and Barbaresca della Campania (Laticauda) breeds.

It is not among the forty-two autochthonous local sheep breeds of limited distribution for which a flock-book is kept by the Associazione Nazionale della Pastorizia, the Italian national association of sheep-breeders. In 2018 the total number reported for the breed was 3670, with a breeding stock of 50 rams and 2600 ewes. In 2024 the reported population was 10 head, a ram and 9 ewes; its conservation status was listed in DAD-IS in 2026 as 'at risk/critical'.

== Characteristics ==
The Quadrella is of small to medium size: on average, ewes stand about 65 cm at the withers and weigh some 65 kg, rams about 85 cm and 80 kg respectively. Both ewes and rams may be either polled or horned; rams are more often horned, ewes more often polled. The fleece is white and extends to the upper part of the face and to parts of the underbelly and legs. The facial profile is fairly straight, the ears are small and are held horizontally.

== Use ==
It is a triple-purpose breed, reared for meat, for milk and for wool. The average milk yield – excluding that taken by the lambs – is about 53 kg in a lactation of 194 days. Lambs were traditionally slaughtered at about 30 days old, when they weighed some 7.5 kg. Fleece weights are approximately 1.2 kg for ewes and 2 kg for rams, with an average fibre diameter of about 30 μm.
