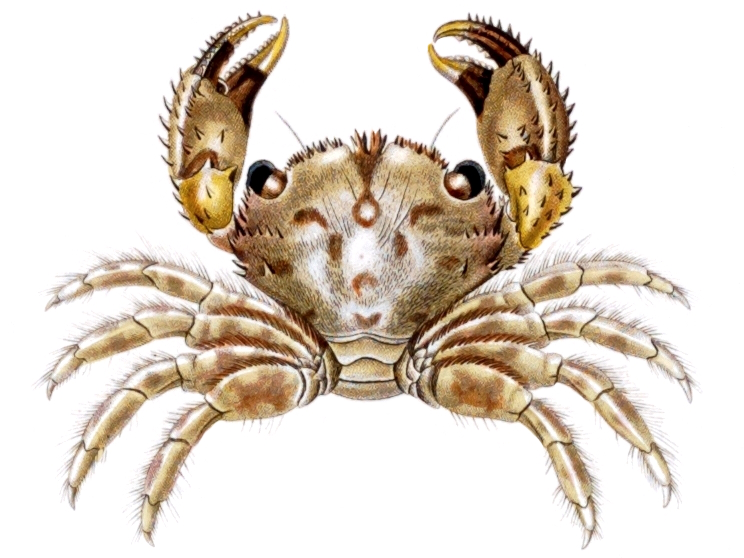
- Domecia hispida

Scientific classification
- Kingdom: Animalia
- Phylum: Arthropoda
- Clade: Pancrustacea
- Class: Malacostraca
- Order: Decapoda
- Suborder: Pleocyemata
- Infraorder: Brachyura
- Section: Eubrachyura
- Subsection: Heterotremata
- Superfamily: Trapezioidea
- Family: Domeciidae; Ortmann, 1893

= Domeciidae =

Family of crabs

Domeciidae is a family of crabs.

== Subfamilies and genera ==
The World Register of Marine Species lists the following genera:

- Domecia Eydoux & Souleyet, 1842
- Jonesius Sankarankutty, 1962
- Maldivia Borradaile, 1902
- Palmyria Galil & Takeda, 1986
