= Estoniops =

Scientific classification
- Domain: Eukaryota
- Kingdom: Animalia
- Phylum: Arthropoda
- Class: †Trilobita
- Order: †Phacopida
- Family: †Pterygometopidae
- Genus: †Estoniops; Mannil, 1958

Species
- Estoniops exilis (Eichwald, 1858) (type) synonym Acaste exilis

Genus of trilobites

Estoniops is a genus of trilobites in the order Phacopida, that existed during the upper Ordovician in what is now Estonia. It was described by Mannil in 1958, and the type species is Estoniops exilis, which was originally described under the genus Acaste by Eichwald in 1858. Its generic name is derived from the country in which it was first discovered.
