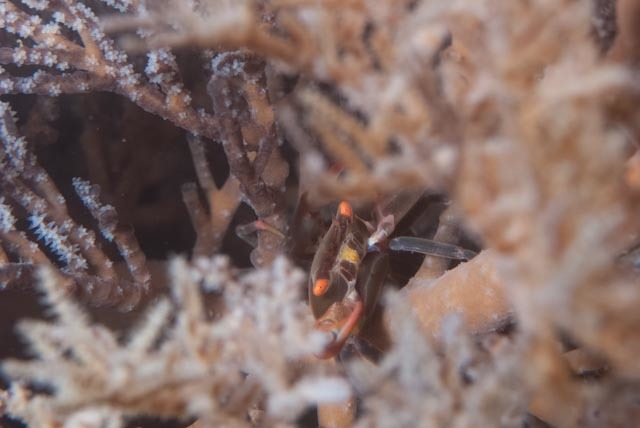
- Quadrella, coral crabs, South Africa

Scientific classification
- Kingdom: Animalia
- Phylum: Arthropoda
- Class: Malacostraca
- Order: Decapoda
- Suborder: Pleocyemata
- Infraorder: Brachyura
- Family: Trapeziidae
- Subfamily: Quadrellinae
- Genus: Quadrella; Dana, 1851

= Quadrella (crab) =

Genus of crabs

Quadrella is a genus of coral crabs in the family Trapeziidae.

== Species ==
These six species belong to the genus Quadrella:

- Quadrella boopsis Alcock, 1898
- Quadrella coronata Dana, 1852
- Quadrella maculosa Alcock, 1898
- Quadrella nitida Smith, 1869
- Quadrella reticulata Alcock, 1898
- Quadrella serenei Galil, 1986
