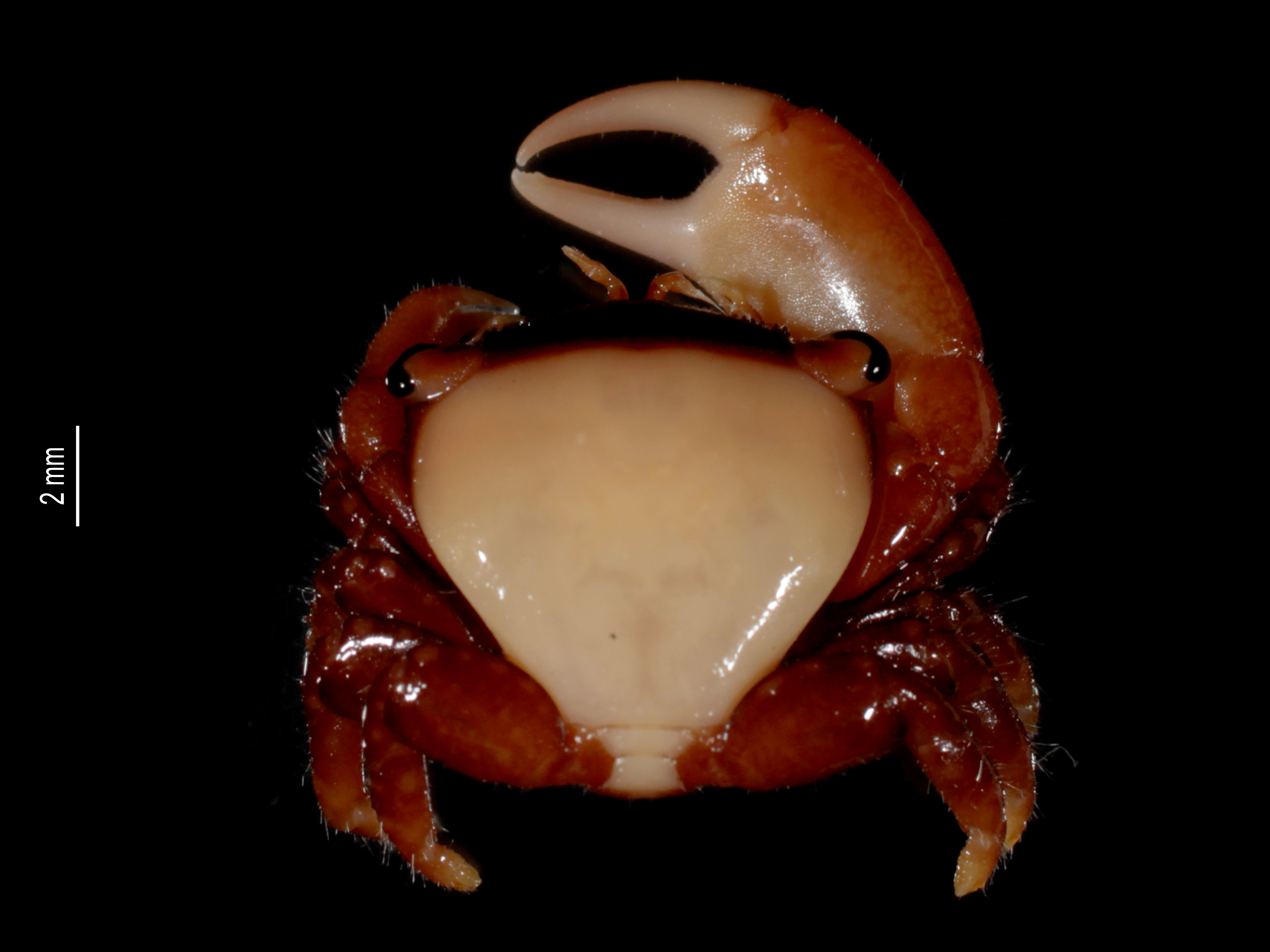
- Tetraloides nigrifrons (dorsal view)

Scientific classification
- Kingdom: Animalia
- Phylum: Arthropoda
- Clade: Pancrustacea
- Class: Malacostraca
- Order: Decapoda
- Suborder: Pleocyemata
- Infraorder: Brachyura
- Section: Eubrachyura
- Subsection: Heterotremata
- Superfamily: Trapezioidea
- Family: Tetraliidae; Castro, Ng & Ahyong, 2004

= Tetraliidae =

Family of crabs

Tetraliidae is a family of crabs.

== Genera ==
The World Register of Marine Species lists the following genera:

- †Eurotetralia De Angeli & Ceccon, 2013
- †Scutata Beschin, Busulini, Tessier & Zorzin, 2016
- Tetralia Dana, 1851
- Tetraloides Galil, 1986
