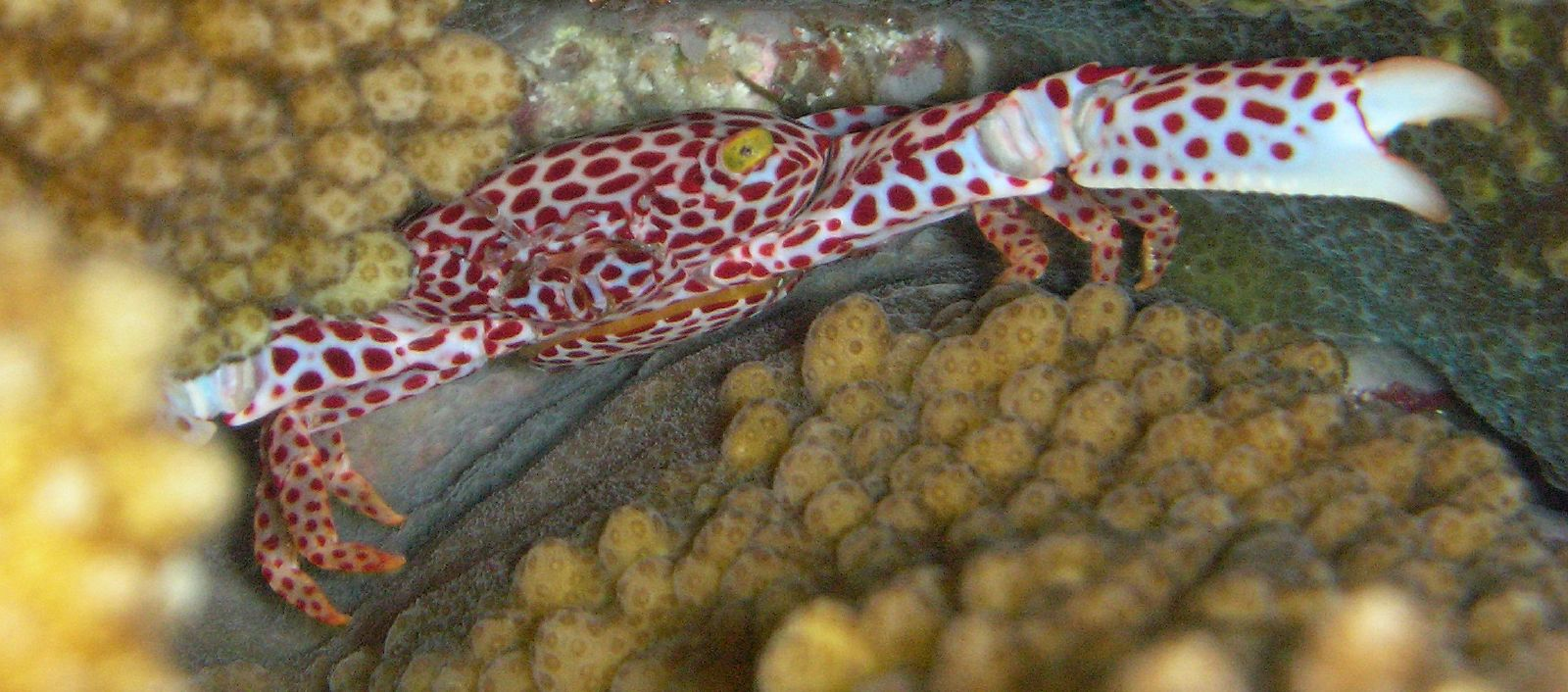
- Trapezia tigrina
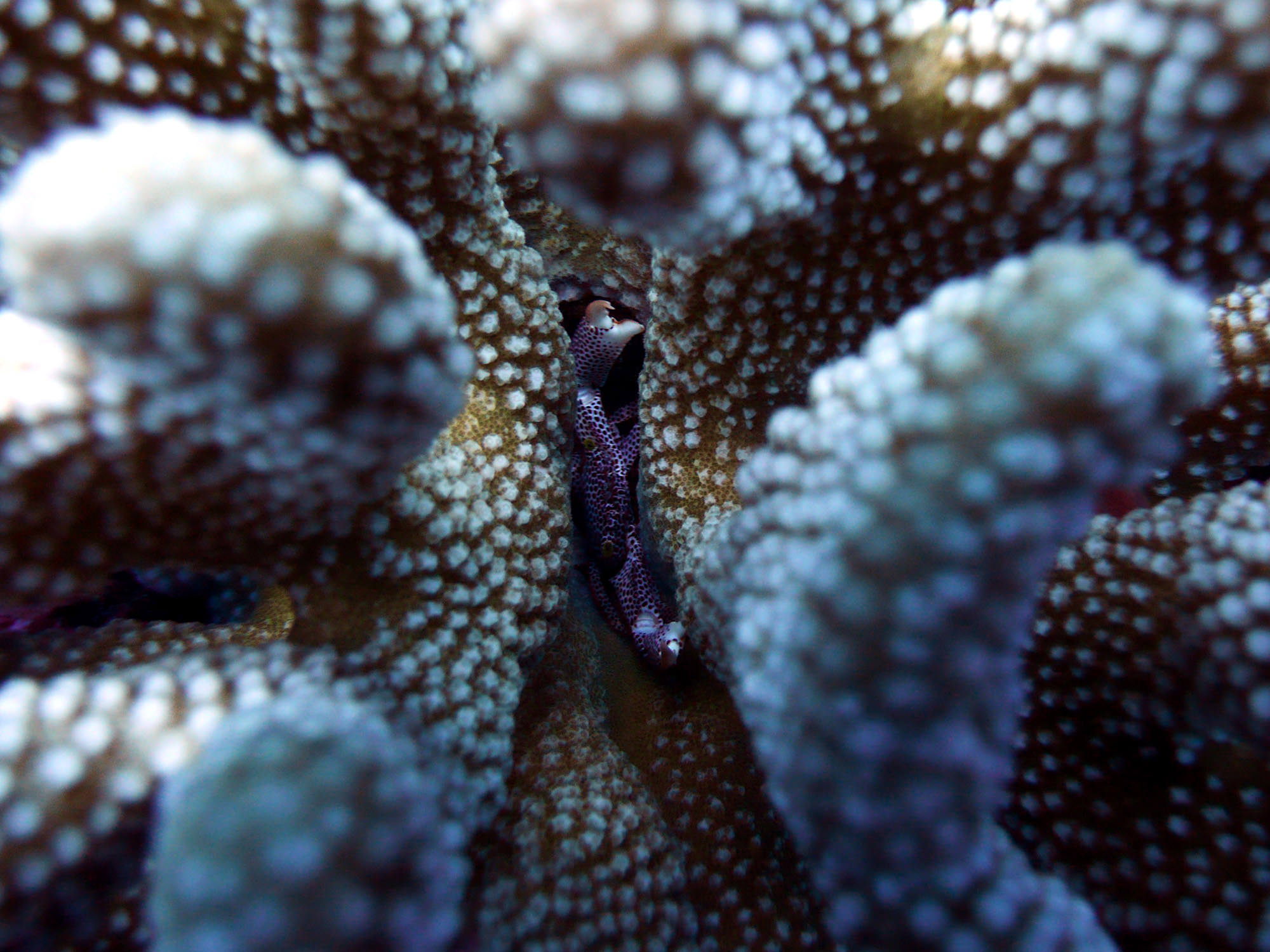
- Trapezia tigrina inhabiting a cauliflower coral (Pocillopora meandrina).

Scientific classification
- Kingdom: Animalia
- Phylum: Arthropoda
- Clade: Pancrustacea
- Class: Malacostraca
- Order: Decapoda
- Suborder: Pleocyemata
- Infraorder: Brachyura
- Family: Trapeziidae
- Genus: Trapezia; Latreille, 1825

Type species
- Trapezia dentifrons Latreille, 1828

= Trapezia (crab) =

Genus of crabs

Trapezia is a genus of guard crabs in the family Trapeziidae. Like other members of this family, they live in association with corals, feeding on coral tissue and mucus, and defending the corals from predators, like starfish. It contains the following species:

- Trapezia areolata Dana, 1852
- Trapezia bella Dana, 1852
- Trapezia bidentata (Forskål, 1775)
- Trapezia cheni Galil, 1983
- Trapezia corallina Gerstaecker, 1857
- Trapezia cymodoce (Herbst, 1801)
- Trapezia digitalis Latreille, 1828
- Trapezia flavopunctata Eydoux & Souleyet, 1842
- Trapezia formosa Stimpson, 1869
- Trapezia garthi Galil, 1983
- Trapezia globosa Castro, 1997
- Trapezia guttata Rüppell, 1830
- Trapezia intermedia Miers, 1886
- Trapezia lutea Castro, 1997
- Trapezia neglecta Castro, 2003
- Trapezia punctimanus Odinetz, 1984
- Trapezia punctipes Castro, 1997
- Trapezia richtersi Galil & Lewinsohn, 1983
- Trapezia rufopunctata (Herbst, 1799)
- Trapezia septata Dana, 1852
- Trapezia serenei Odinetz, 1984
- Trapezia speciosa Dana, 1852
- Trapezia tigrina Eydoux & Souleyet, 1842
