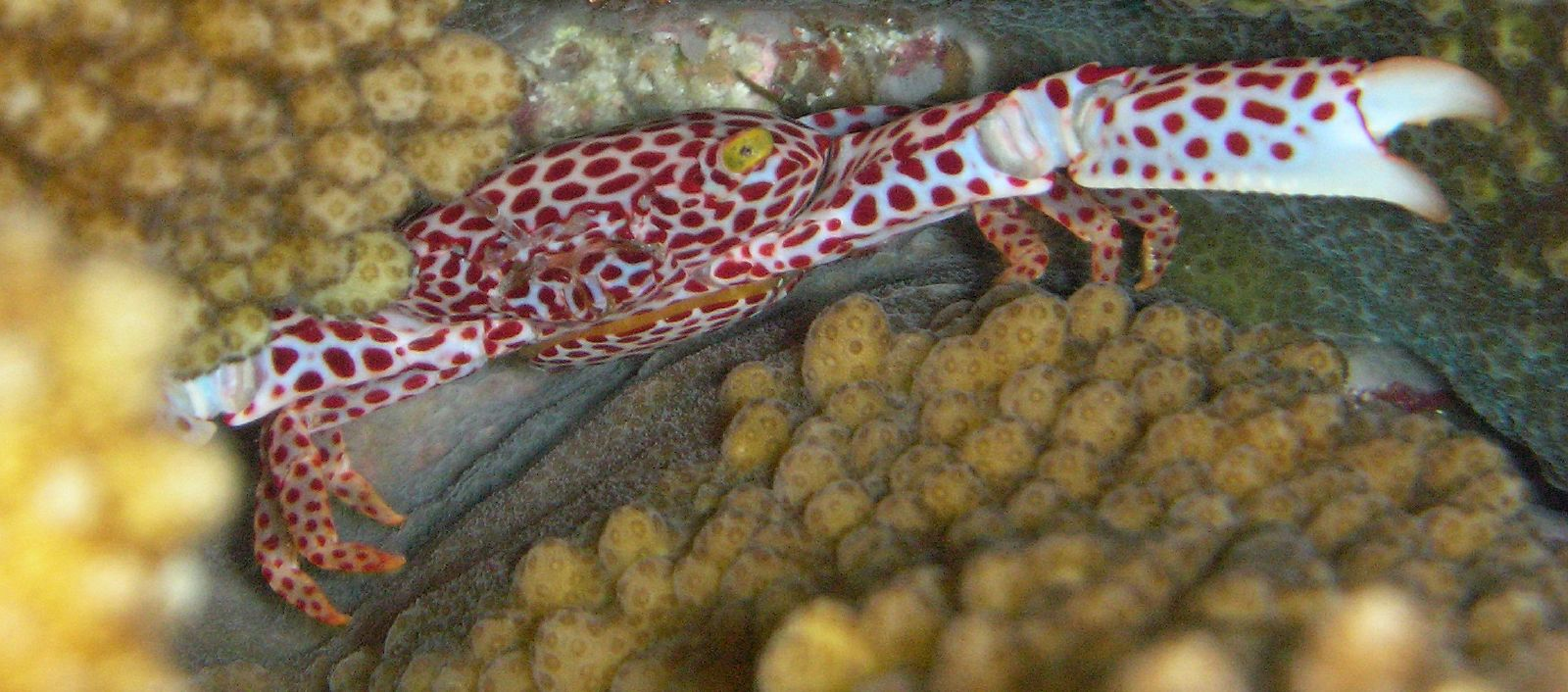
- Trapezia tigrina

Scientific classification
- Kingdom: Animalia
- Phylum: Arthropoda
- Clade: Pancrustacea
- Class: Malacostraca
- Order: Decapoda
- Suborder: Pleocyemata
- Infraorder: Brachyura
- Section: Eubrachyura
- Subsection: Heterotremata
- Superfamily: Trapezioidea
- Family: Trapeziidae; Miers, 1886

Type genus
- Trapezia Latreille, 1825

= Trapeziidae =

Family of crabs

Trapeziidae is a family of crabs, commonly known as coral crabs. All the species in the family are found in a close symbiosis with cnidarians. They are found across the Indo-Pacific, and can best be identified to the species level by the colour patterns they display. Members of the family Tetraliidae were previously included in the Trapeziidae, but the similarities between the taxa is the result of convergent evolution.

== Subfamilies and genera ==
The World Register of Marine Species lists the following subfamilies and genera:

Calocarcininae Stevcic, 2005

- Calocarcinus Calman, 1909
- Philippicarcinus Garth & Kim, 1983
- Sphenomerides Rathbun, 1897

Quadrellinae Stevcic, 2005

- Hexagonalia Galil, 1986
- Hexagonaloides Komai, Higashiji & Castro, 2010
- Quadrella Dana, 1851

Trapeziinae Miers, 1886

- Trapezia Latreille, 1828
