= Araphura whakarakaia =

Scientific classification
- Domain: Eukaryota
- Kingdom: Animalia
- Phylum: Arthropoda
- Class: Malacostraca
- Order: Tanaidacea
- Family: Tanaellidae
- Genus: Araphura
- Species: A. whakarakaia

Binomial name
- Araphura whakarakaia Bird, 2011

Species of crustacean

Araphura whakarakaia is a species of tanaidomorphan malacostracan crustacean found in New Zealand. They rely on drag-powered swimming to move around, and like most species of crustacean, they live in the benthic zone.
