= Paratanais tara =

Scientific classification
- Kingdom: Animalia
- Phylum: Arthropoda
- Clade: Pancrustacea
- Class: Malacostraca
- Order: Tanaidacea
- Family: Paratanaidae
- Genus: Paratanais
- Species: P. tara

Binomial name
- Paratanais tara Bird, 2011

Species of crustacean

Paratanais tara is a species of tanaidomorphan malacostracan crustacean found in New Zealand.
