= Parakonarus kopure =

Scientific classification
- Domain: Eukaryota
- Kingdom: Animalia
- Phylum: Arthropoda
- Class: Malacostraca
- Order: Tanaidacea
- Family: Leptocheliidae
- Genus: Parakonarus
- Species: P. kopure

Binomial name
- Parakonarus kopure Bird, 2011

Species of crustacean

Parakonarus kopure is a species of tanaidomorphan malacostracan crustacean found in New Zealand.
