= Paratanais paraoa =

Scientific classification
- Kingdom: Animalia
- Phylum: Arthropoda
- Clade: Pancrustacea
- Class: Malacostraca
- Order: Tanaidacea
- Family: Paratanaidae
- Genus: Paratanais
- Species: P. paraoa

Binomial name
- Paratanais paraoa Bird, 2011

Species of crustacean

Paratanais paraoa is a species of tanaidomorphan malacostracan crustacean found in New Zealand.
