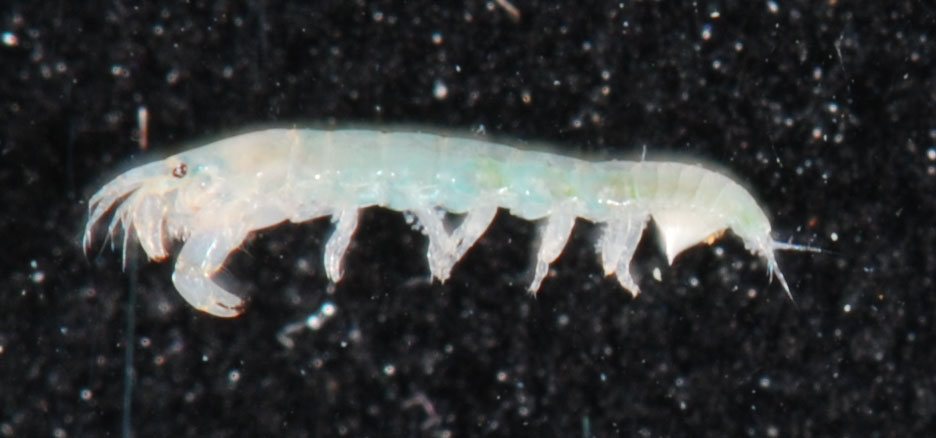
- Female Hargeria rapax morph

Scientific classification
- Kingdom: Animalia
- Phylum: Arthropoda
- Clade: Pancrustacea
- Class: Malacostraca
- Order: Tanaidacea
- Family: Leptocheliidae
- Genus: Hargeria
- Species: H. rapax

Binomial name
- Hargeria rapax (Harger, 1879)

Synonyms
- Leptochelia rapax Harger, 1879

= Hargeria rapax =

Species of tanaid

Hargeria rapax is a species of tanaid, a group of small crustaceans in the class Malacostraca physically similar to shrimp.

== Taxonomic history ==
Hargeria rapax was originally described in 1879 as Leptochelia rapax by Oscar Harger.

== Description ==
Hargeria rapax is a small tanaid characterized by a rostrum with a downward curve that extends past the eyes. Male H.rapax first pair of appendages are large antenna, both of the secondary appendages have large chelae almost as large as the main body, followed by 6 pairs of pereopods then one pair of pleopods and ending with a uropod. Male H. rapax also have greatly reduced mouth parts that may be non-functioning. Female H.rapax possess much smaller primary and secondary appendages as well as functional mouth parts. Like most tanaidaceans H.rapax lacks a telson.

Hargeria rapax constructs tubes made of silt and detritus held together by mucus to live in. These tubes can be attached to the surrounding benthos, flora, or tubes created by other species.

Hargeria rapax are detritovores mainly consuming plant detritus and bottom dwelling diatoms.

== Habitat ==
Hargeria rapax lives in intertidal estuarine communities and can most commonly be found in soft sediment shoreline habitats. H. rapax prefers to inhabit seagrass marshes made up of species like juncus and thalassia. This behavior may be attributed to the lower density of predators in this microhabitats. H. rapax tends to be the most abundant in low elevation marsh edge sediments.

== Distribution ==
Hargeria rapax specimens have been observed from the Caribbean sea up the North American eastern coastline up to Canada.

== Main predators ==
The main predators of H. rapax include grass shrimp (Palaemon pugio), Killifish, and other similarly sized carnivorous fish.

== Life cycle ==
Hargeria rapax is a protogynous species meaning they start life as the female morph then transition to being male, this male portion of the life cycle is short lived and may not feed at all as evidenced by the greatly reduced mouth parts.

Hargeria rapax are external brooders which means they carry their eggs on the outside of their bodies, these eggs hatch into manca larvae that grow into reproductive females. After one or two broods the females molt into reproductive males. Hargeria rapax gravid females can be found throughout the year but are especially abundant during February and March.
