= Pseudotanais jonesi =

Scientific classification
- Domain: Eukaryota
- Kingdom: Animalia
- Phylum: Arthropoda
- Class: Malacostraca
- Order: Tanaidacea
- Family: Pseudotanaidae
- Genus: Pseudotanais
- Species: P. jonesi

Binomial name
- Pseudotanais jonesi Sieg, 1977

Species of crustacean

Pseudotanais jonesi is a species of tanaidacean crustacean.

== Description ==
Males of Pseudotanais jonesi are approximately 1 millimetre (0.04 in) long, while females are 0.8–1.0 mm (0.03–0.04 in) long. There are neither eyes nor ocular lobes on the head. Males are very similar to P. forcipatus, which is the only other species in the family to occur around the British Isles. In females, the cephalothorax is about 1.5 times as wide as it is long, and is triangular. Both the endopodite and the exopodite of the females' uropods are two-segmented, while males have a three-segmented endopodite.

== Distribution ==
Pseudotanais jonesi has only been discovered at a few sites around the British Isles. It is reported to be "fairly common" off the Isle of Man, where it lives in muddy substrates at depths of 32–90 metres (105–295 ft); it also occurs at depths of 20–38 m (66–125 ft) in Loch Creran and the Lynn of Lorn in western Scotland.
