= Synaptotanais notabilis =

Scientific classification
- Domain: Eukaryota
- Kingdom: Animalia
- Phylum: Arthropoda
- Class: Malacostraca
- Order: Tanaidacea
- Family: Tanaididae
- Genus: Synaptotanais
- Species: S. notabilis

Binomial name
- Synaptotanais notabilis Sieg & Winn, 1981

Species of crustacean

Synaptotanais notabilis is a species of malacostracan in the family Tanaididae.
