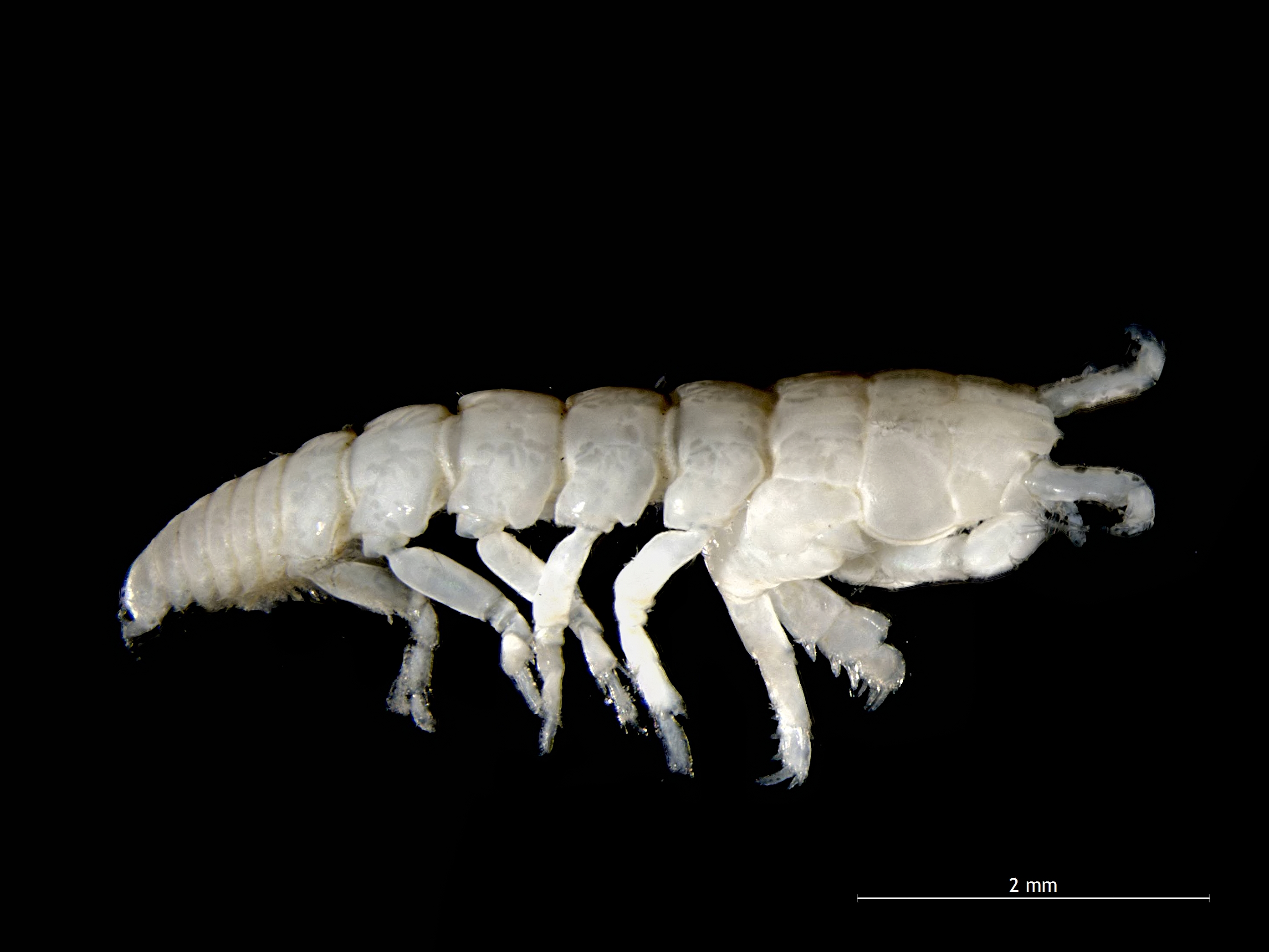

Scientific classification
- Domain: Eukaryota
- Kingdom: Animalia
- Phylum: Arthropoda
- Class: Malacostraca
- Order: Tanaidacea
- Family: Apseudidae
- Genus: Apseudopsis
- Species: A. latreillii

Binomial name
- Apseudopsis latreillii (H. Milne-Edwards, 1828)

Synonyms
- Apseudes latreillii Milne Edwards, 1828; Apseudes latreillei Milne Edwards, 1828

= Apseudopsis latreillii =

Species of crustacean

Apseudopsis latreillii is a species of tanaidacean widely-distributed in the north-east Atlantic and Mediterranean coastal waters. It inhabits sandy and muddy bottoms from the intertidal to 138 m (453 ft) in depth and is often found in large numbers. It grows up to 7 mm (0.28 in) in length (excluding the uropods).
