= Tanaopsis rawhitia =

Scientific classification
- Kingdom: Animalia
- Phylum: Arthropoda
- Clade: Pancrustacea
- Class: Malacostraca
- Order: Tanaidacea
- Family: Tanaopsidae
- Genus: Tanaopsis
- Species: T. rawhitia

Binomial name
- Tanaopsis rawhitia Bird, 2011

Species of crustacean

Tanaopsis rawhitia is a species of tanaidomorphan malacostracan crustacean found in New Zealand.
