= Atemtanais =

Scientific classification
- Domain: Eukaryota
- Kingdom: Animalia
- Phylum: Arthropoda
- Class: Malacostraca
- Order: Tanaidacea
- Family: Paratanaidae
- Subfamily: Paratanaidinae
- Genus: Atemtanais; Bird, 2011
- Species: A. taikaha

Binomial name
- Atemtanais taikaha Bird, 2011

Species of crustacean

Atemtanais is a genus of tanaidomorphan malacostracan crustacean found in New Zealand. The only species is Atemtanais taikaha.
