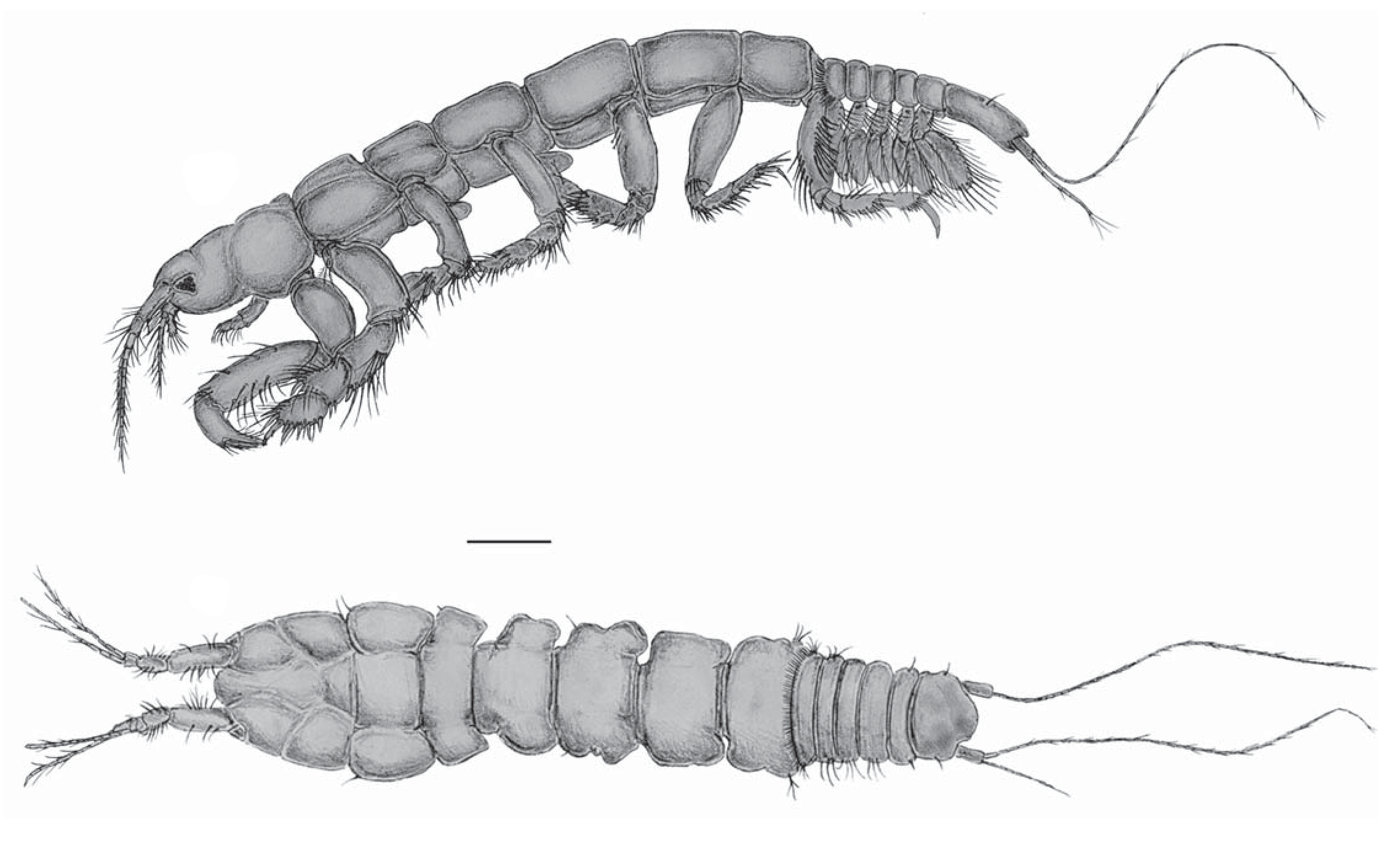
- Holotype (♀) of Longiflagrum amphibium. Top: lateral view. Bottom: dorsal view. Scale bar: 1 mm.

Scientific classification
- Domain: Eukaryota
- Kingdom: Animalia
- Phylum: Arthropoda
- Class: Malacostraca
- Order: Tanaidacea
- Family: Parapseudidae
- Subfamily: Parapseudinae; Gutu, 2008

Genera
- See text

= Parapseudinae =

Subfamily of crustacean

Parapseudinae is an estuarine subfamily of crustacean in the order Tanaidacea.

== Genera ==
According to the World Register of Marine Species, the following genera are accepted within Parapseudinae:

- Akanthoparapseudes Heard & Morales-Núñez, 2011
- Aponychos Bamber, Chatterjee & Marshall, 2012
- Ascumnella Gutu & Heard, 2002
- Brachylicoa Gutu, 2006
- Ctenapseudes Bamber, Ariyananda & Silva, 1997
- Discapseudes Bacescu & Gutu, 1975
- Gutuapseudes Edgar, 1997
- Hainanius Bamber, 1999
- Halmyrapseudes Bacescu & Gutu, 1974
- Longiflagrum Gutu, 1995
- Longipedis Larsen & Shimomura, 2006
- Parapseudes Sars, 1882
- Podictenius Gutu, 2006
- Pseudoapseudes Gutu, 1981
- Pseudohalmyrapseudes Larsen & Hansknecht, 2004
- Remexudes Błażewicz-Paszkowycz & Bamber, 2007
- Saltipedis Gutu, 1995
