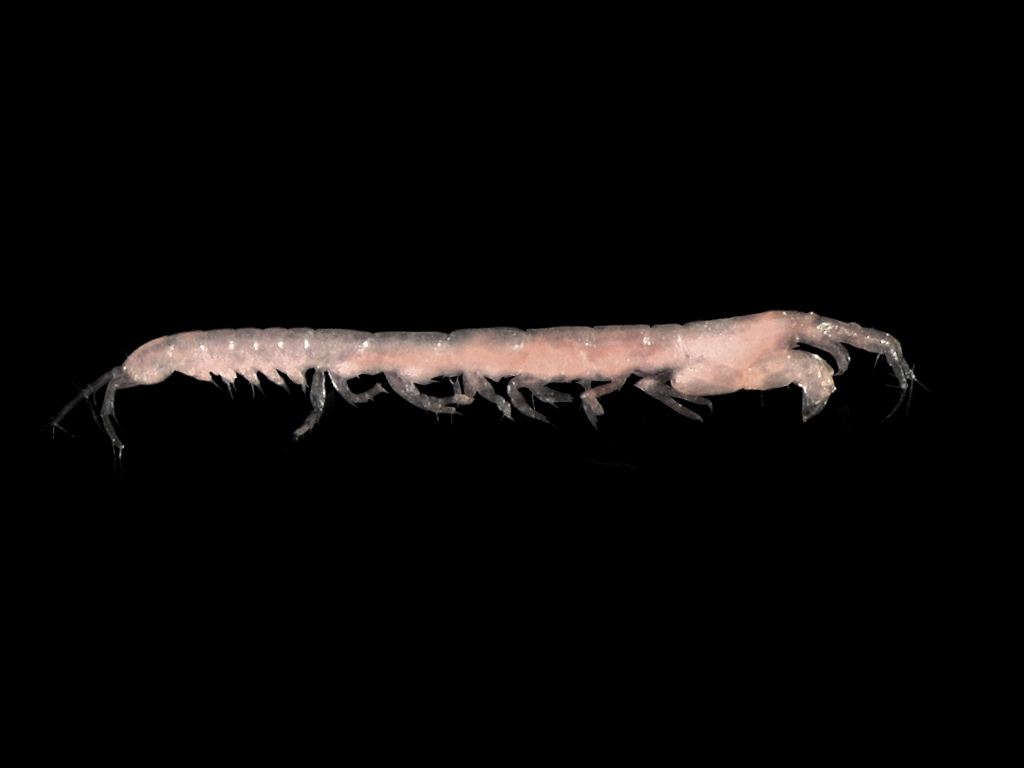

Scientific classification
- Kingdom: Animalia
- Phylum: Arthropoda
- Clade: Pancrustacea
- Class: Malacostraca
- Order: Tanaidacea
- Suborder: Tanaidomorpha
- Superfamily: Paratanaoidea; Lang, 1949

Family
- See text

= Paratanaoidea =

Superfamily of crustacean

Paratanaoidea is a superfamily of malacostracan crustacean.

== Families ==
According to the World Register of Marine Species, the following families are accepted within Paratanaoidea:

- Agathotanaidae Lang, 1971
- Akanthophoreidae Sieg, 1986
- Anarthruridae Lang, 1971
- Colletteidae Larsen & Wilson, 2002
- Cryptocopidae Sieg, 1977
- Hamatipedidae Błażewicz, Gellert & Bird, 2022
- Heterotanoididae Bird, 2012
- Leptocheliidae Lang, 1973
- Leptognathiidae Sieg, 1976
- Mirandotanaidae Błażewicz-Paszkowycz & Bamber, 2009
- Nototanaidae Sieg, 1976
- Paranarthrurellidae Błażewicz, Jóźwiak & Frutos, 2019
- Paratanaidae Lang, 1949
- Pseudotanaidae Sieg, 1976
- Pseudozeuxidae Sieg, 1982
- Tanaellidae Larsen & Wilson, 2002
- Tanaissuidae Bird & Larsen, 2009
- Tanaopsidae Błażewicz-Paszkowycz & Bamber, 2012
- Teleotanaidae Bamber, 2008
- Typhlotanaidae Sieg, 1984

The following genera are regarded as Paratanaoidea incertae sedis, meaning their familial placement is uncertain:

- Andrognathia Sieg, 1983
- Androtanais Sieg, 1976
- Armaturatanais Larsen, 2005
- Bifidia Sieg & Zibrowius, 1988
- Coalecerotanais Larsen, 2003
- Cristatotanais Kudinova-Pasternak, 1990
- Exspina Lang, 1968
- Gejavis Błażewicz-Paszkowycz & Bamber, 2012
- Insociabilitanais Larsen, 2005
- Kanikipa Bird, 2011
- Leptognathioides Bird & Holdich, 1984
- Monstrotanais Kudinova-Pasternak, 1981
- Parafilitanais Kudinova-Pasternak, 1989
- Portaratrum Guerrero-Kommritz, 2003
- Pseudoarthrura Larsen, 2005
- Pseudomacrinella Kudinova-Pasternak, 1990
- Pseudoparatanais Lang, 1973
- Robustochelia Kudinova-Pasternak, 1983
- Safaritanais Kudinova-Pasternak, 1987
- Salemia Lang, 1971
- Selvagentanais Larsen, 2013
- Singula Blazewicz-Paszkowycz, 2005
- Tanabnormia Gutu, 1986
- Tangalooma Bamber, 2008
- Unispinosus Chim & Tong, 2020
