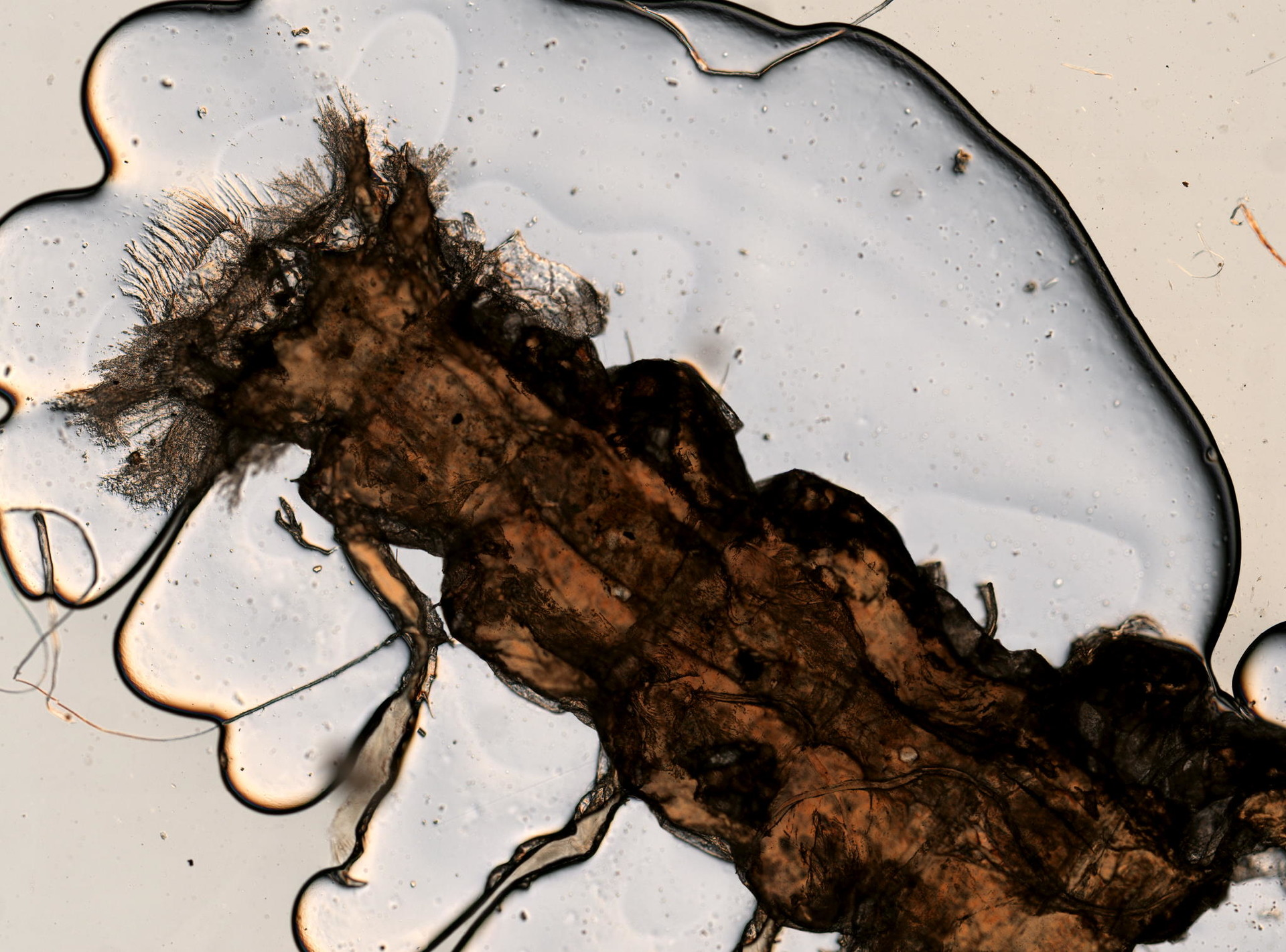

Scientific classification
- Kingdom: Animalia
- Phylum: Arthropoda
- Clade: Pancrustacea
- Class: Malacostraca
- Order: Tanaidacea
- Family: Tanaididae
- Genus: Tanais
- Species: T. dulongii

Binomial name
- Tanais dulongii (Audouin, 1826)

Synonyms
- Anatanais gallardoi (Giambiagi, 1922); Crossurus vittatus Rathke, 1843; Eupheus ligusticus White, 1847; Gammarus dulongii Audouin, 1826; Tanais cavolinii Milne-Edwards, 1840; Tanais gallardoi Giambiagi, 1922; Tanais hirticaudatus Lilljeborg, 1864; Tanais tomentosus Krøyer, 1842; Tanais vittatus (Rathke, 1843)

= Tanais dulongii =

Species of crustacean

Tanais dulongii is a species of malacostracan in the family Tanaididae. It inhabits the shores and shallow waters of the Atlantic coast of Europe and North and South America, the Mediterranean Sea, and south-west Australia (Indian Ocean). Tanais dulongii are small benthic crustaceans that belong to the phylum Arthropoda. They are a bottom dwelling species that are widely distributed across rocky shores and shallow benthic environments. They are known for having the potential to be an indicator species, which could give insight to the overall health and condition of certain marine environments.

== Description ==
Tanais dulongii are very small organisms, usually less than 3mm in length. T. dulongii, similar to other Tanaididae, have long segmented bodies, with claw-like appendages called chelipeds. The species exhibits sexual dimorphism, with males being characterized by having larger chelipeds, and females characterized by having smaller chilepeds along with the presence of ovisacs. Females can further be categorized by their reproductive stages of pre-ovigerous (ovisacs present), ovigerous (marsupium present), and post ovigerous (ovisacs not present).

== Reproduction and Development ==
During their reproductive window, male T. dulongii migrate searching for ovigerous females, who can be found moving around the ocean floor or hiding in tubes or burrows. The female then carries her eggs in a pouch called a marsupium until the eggs are ready to hatch. After fertilization occurs, the offspring are hatched and undergo two early development stages called manca I and II. From there, juvenile T. dulongii develop independently.

== Habitat ==
Like other Tanaididae, T. dulongii are bottom dwellers and are widely distributed across rocky shores, algal habitats, and are frequently found near docs and harbors. They were originally thought to have originated from the Mediterranean coast off of Egypt, and have since been observed in oceans worldwide.

== Diet ==
Tanais dulongii are detritivores, which feed on detritus, algae, and microorganisms in their benthic environments.

== Ecological Relevance ==
Resent research has marked T. dulongii as a possible indicator species of pollution, dissolved oxygen levels, and sewage contamination in marine ecosystems.
