= Kanikipa =

Scientific classification
- Domain: Eukaryota
- Kingdom: Animalia
- Phylum: Arthropoda
- Class: Malacostraca
- Order: Tanaidacea
- Superfamily: Paratanaoidea
- Family: incertae sedis
- Genus: Kanikipa; Bird, 2011
- Species: K. portobelloensis

Binomial name
- Kanikipa portobelloensis Bird, 2011

Species of crustacean

Kanikipa is a monotypic genus of tanaidomorphan malacostracan crustacean found in New Zealand. Kanikipa portobelloensis is the sole species placed within the genus.
