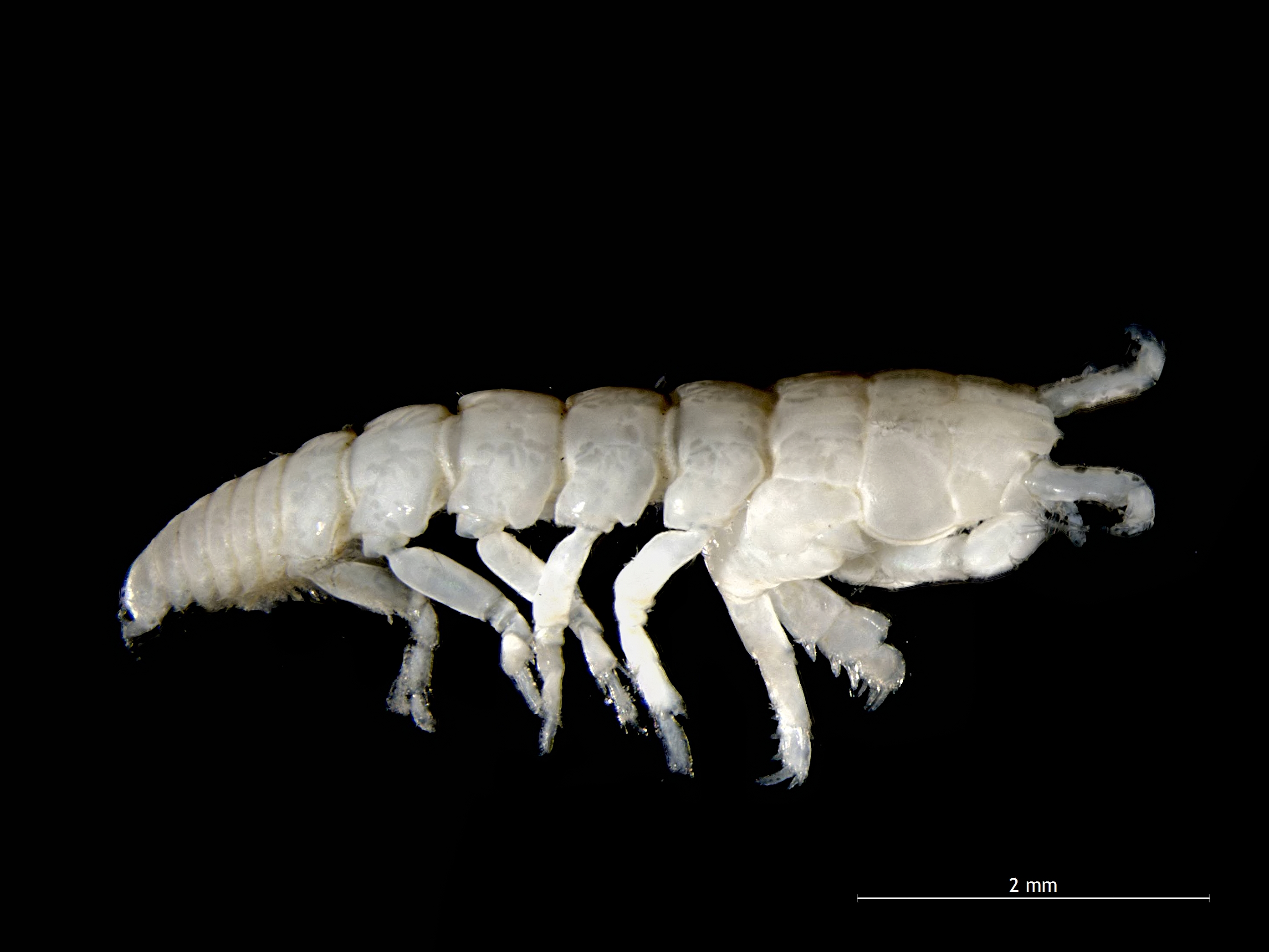
- Apseudopsis latreillii

Scientific classification
- Domain: Eukaryota
- Kingdom: Animalia
- Phylum: Arthropoda
- Class: Malacostraca
- Order: Tanaidacea
- Family: Apseudidae
- Genus: Apseudopsis; Norman, 1899

= Apseudopsis =

Genus of crustaceans

Apseudopsis is a genus of crustaceans belonging to the family Apseudidae. The genus has almost cosmopolitan distribution.

== Species ==
The following species are accepted by the World Register of Marine Species:

- Apseudopsis acutifrons (Sars, 1882)
- Apseudopsis adami Esquete & Bamber, 2012
- Apseudopsis annabensis (Gutu, 2002)
- Apseudopsis apocryphus (Gutu, 2002)
- Apseudopsis arguinensis (Gutu, 2002)
- Apseudopsis bacescui (Gutu, 2002)
- Apseudopsis bruneinigma (Bamber, 1999)
- Apseudopsis caribbeanus Gutu, 2006
- Apseudopsis cuanzanus Bochert, 2012
- Apseudopsis elisae (Băcescu, 1961)
- Apseudopsis erythraeicus (Băcescu, 1984)
- Apseudopsis formosus Carvalho, Pereira & Esquete, 2019
- Apseudopsis gabesi Esquete, 2019
- Apseudopsis hastifrons (Norman & Stebbing, 1886)
- Apseudopsis isochelatus Gutu, 2006
- Apseudopsis latreillii (H. Milne-Edwards, 1828)
- Apseudopsis mediterraneus (Băcescu, 1961)
- Apseudopsis minimus (Gutu, 2002)
- Apseudopsis olimpiae (Gutu, 1986)
- Apseudopsis opisthoscolops Bamber, Chatterjee & Marshall, 2012
- Apseudopsis ostroumovi Băcescu & Carausu, 1947
- Apseudopsis rogi Esquete, 2016
- Apseudopsis tridens (Gutu, 2002)
- Apseudopsis tuski (Błażewicz-Paszkowycz & Bamber, 2007)
- Apseudopsis uncidigitatus (Norman & Stebbing, 1886)
