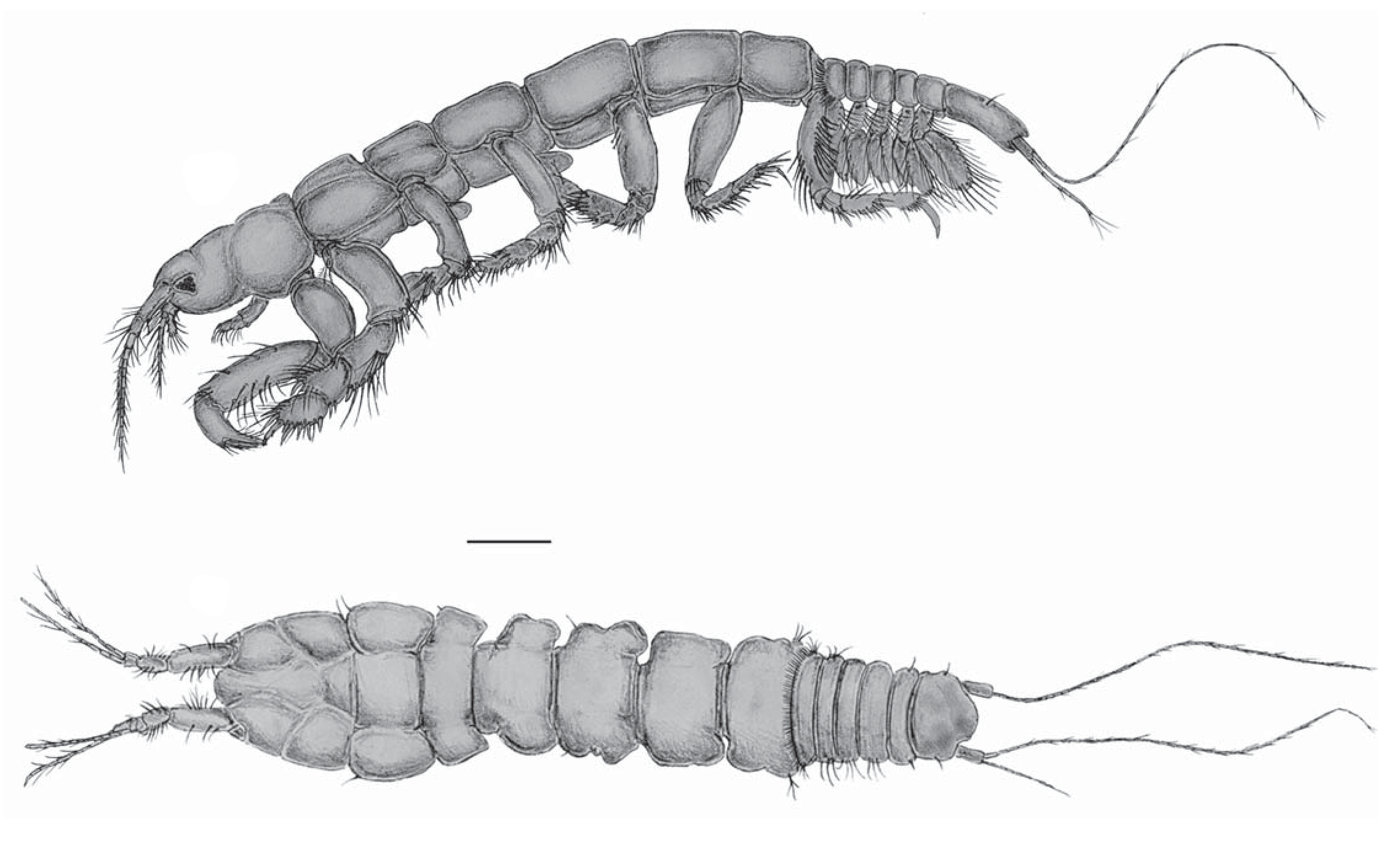
- Holotype (♀) of Longiflagrum amphibium. Top: lateral view. Bottom: dorsal view. Scale bar: 1 mm.

Scientific classification
- Domain: Eukaryota
- Kingdom: Animalia
- Phylum: Arthropoda
- Class: Malacostraca
- Order: Tanaidacea
- Family: Parapseudidae
- Genus: Longiflagrum
- Species: L. amphibium

Binomial name
- Longiflagrum amphibium Stępień & Błażewicz-Paszkowycz, 2009

= Longiflagrum amphibium =

Species of crustacean

Longiflagrum amphibium is an estuarine species of crustacean in the order Tanaidacea. It is known only from the type locality, which is the intertidal zone at Port Hedland, Northwestern Australia.

== Description ==
Longiflagrum amphibium can be distinguished from the other four species of the genus Longiflagrum by having the shortest flagellum in the antennule and by its oval pleopod basis. The specific name amphibium is from the Latin for "amphibious". The name reflects the species' presence in the intertidal zone.

== Ecology ==
All five Longiflagrum species occur in shallow coastal habitats such as the intertidal zone, eelgrass beds and estuaries where the salinity fluctuates over the range 5–34 psu, and they are a frequent and abundant element of the soft-bottom ecosystem.
