= Pagurapseudopsis =

Scientific classification
- Kingdom: Animalia
- Phylum: Arthropoda
- Clade: Pancrustacea
- Class: Malacostraca
- Order: Tanaidacea
- Suborder: Apseudomorpha
- Superfamily: Apseudoidea
- Family: Pagurapseudopsididae; Gutu, 2006
- Genus: Pagurapseudopsis; Shiino, 1963

Genus of crustaceans

Pagurapseudopsis is a genus of crustaceans in the family Pagurapseudidae, containing the following species:

- Pagurapseudopsis carinata (Bacescu, 1981)
- Pagurapseudopsis gracilipes Shiino, 1963
- Pagurapseudopsis gymnophobia (Barnard, 1935)
- Pagurapseudopsis iranica Bacescu, 1978
- Pagurapseudopsis thailandica Angsupanich, 2001
