= Karllangia pulchra =

Scientific classification
- Kingdom: Animalia
- Phylum: Arthropoda
- Class: Copepoda
- Order: Harpacticoida
- Family: Parastenheliidae
- Genus: Karllangia
- Species: K. pulchra

Binomial name
- Karllangia pulchra Mielke, 1994

Species of crustacean

Karllangia pulchra is a species of marine copepod.
