= Pseudotanais =

Scientific classification
- Domain: Eukaryota
- Kingdom: Animalia
- Phylum: Arthropoda
- Class: Malacostraca
- Order: Tanaidacea
- Family: Pseudotanaidae
- Subfamily: Pseudotanainae
- Genus: Pseudotanais; Sars, 1882

Synonyms
- Pontotanais Bacescu, 1960; Pseudotanais (Pseudotanais) Sars, 1882

Genus of crustacean

Pseudotanais is a genus of tanaidacean crustacean.

== Species ==
According to the World Register of Marine Species, the following species are accepted within Pseudotanais:

- Pseudotanais abathogaster Błażewicz-Paszkowycz, Bamber & Jóźwiak, 2013
- Pseudotanais affinis Hansen, 1887
- Pseudotanais amundseni Błażewicz, Jakiel, Bamber & Bird, 2021
- Pseudotanais artoo Błażewicz-Paszkowycz & Stępień, 2015
- Pseudotanais baresnauti Bird, 1999
- Pseudotanais barnesi Błażewicz, Jakiel, Bamber & Bird, 2021
- Pseudotanais biopearli Błażewicz, Jakiel, Bamber & Bird, 2021
- Pseudotanais borceai Bacescu, 1960
- Pseudotanais californiensis Dojiri & Sieg, 1997
- Pseudotanais chaplini Jakiel, Palero & Błażewicz, 2019
- Pseudotanais chopini Jakiel, Palero & Błażewicz, 2019
- Pseudotanais colonus Bird & Holdich, 1989
- Pseudotanais corollatus Bird & Holdich, 1989
- Pseudotanais crassicornis Hansen, 1887
- Pseudotanais curieae Jakiel, Palero & Błażewicz, 2020
- Pseudotanais denticulatus Bird & Holdich, 1989
- Pseudotanais discoveryae Błażewicz, Jakiel, Bamber & Bird, 2021
- Pseudotanais elephas Błażewicz, Jakiel, Bamber & Bird, 2021
- Pseudotanais enduranceae Błażewicz, Jakiel, Bamber & Bird, 2021
- Pseudotanais falcicula Bird & Holdich, 1989
- Pseudotanais falcifer Blazewicz-Paszkowycz & Bamber, 2011
- Pseudotanais forcipatus (Lilljeborg, 1864)
- Pseudotanais forcipatus Vanhöffen, 1907
- Pseudotanais gaiae Jakiel, Palero & Błażewicz, 2019
- Pseudotanais georgesandae Jakiel, Palero & Błażewicz, 2019
- Pseudotanais geralti Jakiel, Palero & Błażewicz, 2019
- Pseudotanais inflatus Kudinova-Pasternak, 1973
- Pseudotanais intortus Błażewicz-Paszkowycz, Bamber & Jóźwiak, 2013
- Pseudotanais isabelae García-Herrero, Sánchez, García-Gómez, Pardos & Martínez, 2017
- Pseudotanais jonesi Sieg, 1977
- Pseudotanais julietae Jakiel, Palero & Błażewicz, 2019
- Pseudotanais kitsoni Błażewicz, Jakiel, Bamber & Bird, 2021
- Pseudotanais kobro Jakiel, Palero & Błażewicz, 2019
- Pseudotanais kurchatovi Kudinova-Pasternak & Pasternak, 1978
- Pseudotanais lilljeborgii Sars, 1882
- Pseudotanais livingstoni Błażewicz, Jakiel, Bamber & Bird, 2021
- Pseudotanais locueloae Jakiel, Palero & Błażewicz, 2020
- Pseudotanais longisetosus Sieg, 1977
- Pseudotanais longispinus Bird & Holdich, 1989
- Pseudotanais macrocheles Sars, 1882
- Pseudotanais mariae Jakiel, Palero & Błażewicz, 2019
- Pseudotanais mediterraneus Sars, 1882
- Pseudotanais mexikolpos Sieg & Heard, 1988
- Pseudotanais misericorde Jakiel, Stępień & Błażewicz, 2018
- Pseudotanais monroeae Jakiel, Palero & Błażewicz, 2020
- Pseudotanais nipponicus McLelland, 2007
- Pseudotanais nordenskioldi Sieg, 1977
- Pseudotanais oculatus Hansen, 1913
- Pseudotanais oloughlini Jakiel, Palero & Błażewicz, 2019
- Pseudotanais palmeri Błażewicz, Jakiel, Bamber & Bird, 2021
- Pseudotanais rapunzelae Błażewicz, Jakiel, Bamber & Bird, 2021
- Pseudotanais romeo Jakiel, Palero & Błażewicz, 2019
- Pseudotanais scalpellum Bird & Holdich, 1989
- Pseudotanais scotti Błażewicz, Jakiel, Bamber & Bird, 2021
- Pseudotanais shackletoni Błażewicz, Jakiel, Bamber & Bird, 2021
- Pseudotanais sigrunis Jakiel, Stępień & Błażewicz, 2018
- Pseudotanais soja Błażewicz-Paszkowycz, Bamber & Jóźwiak, 2013
- Pseudotanais spatula Bird & Holdich, 1989
- Pseudotanais spicatus Bird & Holdich, 1989
- Pseudotanais stiletto Bamber, 2009
- Pseudotanais svavarssoni Jakiel, Stępień & Błażewicz, 2018
- Pseudotanais szymborskae Jakiel, Palero & Błażewicz, 2020
- Pseudotanais tympanobaculum Blazewicz-Paszkowycz, Bamber & Cunha, 2011
- Pseudotanais unicus Sieg, 1977
- Pseudotanais uranos Jakiel, Palero & Błażewicz, 2019
- Pseudotanais vitjazi Kudinova-Pasternak, 1966
- Pseudotanais vulsella Bird & Holdich, 1989
- Pseudotanais yenneferae Jakiel, Palero & Błażewicz, 2019
