= Karllangia arenicola =

Scientific classification
- Kingdom: Animalia
- Phylum: Arthropoda
- Class: Copepoda
- Order: Harpacticoida
- Family: Parastenheliidae
- Genus: Karllangia
- Species: K. arenicola

Binomial name
- Karllangia arenicola Noodt, 1964

Species of crustacean

Karllangia arenicola is a species of marine copepod. It is the type species of the genus Karllangia. The species was described by Noodt in 1964.
