= Tanaopsis =

Scientific classification
- Kingdom: Animalia
- Phylum: Arthropoda
- Clade: Pancrustacea
- Class: Malacostraca
- Order: Tanaidacea
- Suborder: Tanaidomorpha
- Superfamily: Paratanaoidea
- Family: Tanaopsidae; Błażewicz-Paszkowycz & Bamber, 2012
- Genus: Tanaopsis; Sars, 1899

Genus of tanaids

Tanaopsis is a genus of tanaids and the only member of the monotypic family Tanaopsidae. It contains 17 species.

== Species ==
Tanaopsis contains the following species:

- Tanaopsis antarctica Lang, 1967
- Tanaopsis bamberi Segadilha & Araújo-Silva, 2015
- Tanaopsis boonwurrungi Błażewicz-Paszkowycz & Bamber, 2012
- Tanaopsis brevicorpus Segadilha & Araújo-Silva, 2015
- Tanaopsis cadieni Sieg & Dojiri, 1991
- Tanaopsis canaipa Bamber, 2008
- Tanaopsis chotkarakde Bird & Bamber, 2000
- Tanaopsis curtus Kudinova-Pasternak, 1984
- Tanaopsis gallardoi (Shiino, 1970)
- Tanaopsis graciloides (Lilljeborg, 1864)
- Tanaopsis japonica Kakui & Shimada, 2017
- Tanaopsis kerguelenensis Shiino, 1978
- Tanaopsis laticaudata (Sars, 1882)
- Tanaopsis oios Błażewicz-Paszkowycz & Bamber, 2012
- Tanaopsis profunda Lang, 1967
- Tanaopsis rawhitia Bird, 2011
- Tanaopsis rugaris Błażewicz-Paszkowycz, Bamber & Jóźwiak, 2013
