= Tanais (disambiguation) =

Tanais was an ancient Greek city in the Don river delta.

Tanais may also refer to:

- Tanais River or Don River
- Tanais, a Soviet coaster wrecked in October 1943
- SS Tanais, a German requisitioned cargo vessel torpedoed by a RN submarine in June 1944
- Tanais (crustacean), a genus of arthropods
- 12492 Tanais, a main belt asteroid
- Tanaïs, author and perfumer formerly known as Tanwi Nandini Islam

== See also ==
- Tanai (disambiguation)
