= Synaptotanais =

Scientific classification
- Domain: Eukaryota
- Kingdom: Animalia
- Phylum: Arthropoda
- Class: Malacostraca
- Order: Tanaidacea
- Family: Tanaididae
- Subfamily: Tanaidinae
- Genus: Synaptotanais; Sieg, 1980

Genus of crustaceans

Synaptotanais is a genus of malacostracans in the family Tanaididae. There are at least 2 described species in Synaptotanais.

== Species ==
- Synaptotanais abyssorum (Nierstrasz, 1913)
- Synaptotanais notabilis Sieg & Winn, 1981
