= Hexapleomera =

Scientific classification
- Domain: Eukaryota
- Kingdom: Animalia
- Phylum: Arthropoda
- Class: Malacostraca
- Order: Tanaidacea
- Family: Tanaididae
- Subfamily: Pancolinae
- Genus: Hexapleomera; Dudich, 1931

Type species
- Tanais robustus Moore, 1894

Diversity
- 8 species

Genus of crustaceans

Hexapleomera is a genus of crustaceans belonging to the family Tanaididae. There are 8 species in the genus.

== Species ==
- Hexapleomera bultidactyla Esquete & Fernandez‑Gonzalez, 2016
- Hexapleomera edgari Bamber, 2012
- Hexapleomera moverleyi (Edgar, 2008)
- Hexapleomera robusta (Moore, 1894)
- Hexapleomera satella Bamber, 2012
- Hexapleomera ulsana Wi, Jeong & Kang, 2018
- Hexapleomera urashima Tanabe, Hayashi, Tomioka & Kakui, 2017
- Hexapleomera wombat Bamber, 2012
- Hexapleomera crassa Riggio, 1975 (nomen nudum)
