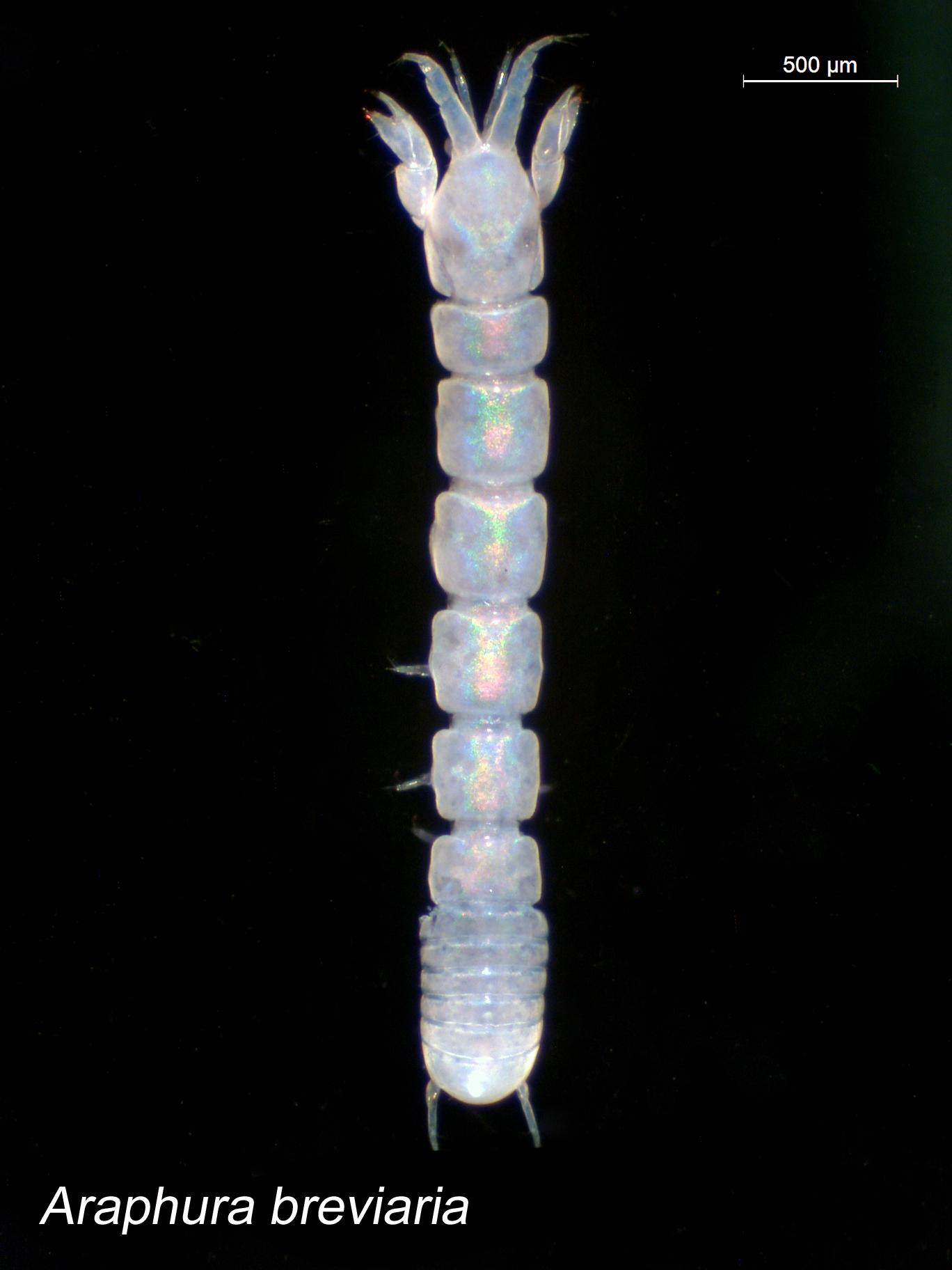
- Araphura breviara

Scientific classification
- Domain: Eukaryota
- Kingdom: Animalia
- Phylum: Arthropoda
- Class: Malacostraca
- Order: Tanaidacea
- Family: Tanaellidae
- Genus: Araphura; Bird & Holdich, 1984

Species
- See text

= Araphura =

Genus of crustacean

Araphura is a genus of malacostracan crustacean found in New Zealand.

== Species ==
According to the World Register of Marine Species, the following species are accepted within Araphura:

- Araphura arvedlundi Larsen & Araújo-Silva, 2009
- Araphura breviaria Dojiri & Sieg, 1997
- Araphura brevimanus (Lilljeborg, 1864)
- Araphura curticauda Larsen, 2005
- Araphura cuspirostris Dojiri & Sieg, 1997
- Araphura doutagalla Błażewicz-Paszkowycz & Bamber, 2012
- Araphura elongata (Shiino, 1970)
- Araphura extensa Larsen, 2003
- Araphura filiformis (Lilljeborg, 1864)
- Araphura higginsi Sieg & Dojiri, 1989
- Araphura io Bamber, 2005
- Araphura joubinensis Sieg & Dojiri, 1989
- Araphura macrobelone Błażewicz-Paszkowycz, Bamber & Cunha, 2011
- Araphura parabrevimanus (Lang, 1968)
- Araphura pygmothymos Błażewicz-Paszkowycz & Bamber, 2012
- Araphura rectifrons (Kudinova-Pasternak, 1973)
- Araphura spinithenari Larsen, 2005
- Araphura studens Blazewicz & Debiec, 2017
- Araphura whakarakaia Bird, 2011
- Araphura yarra Błażewicz-Paszkowycz & Bamber, 2012
