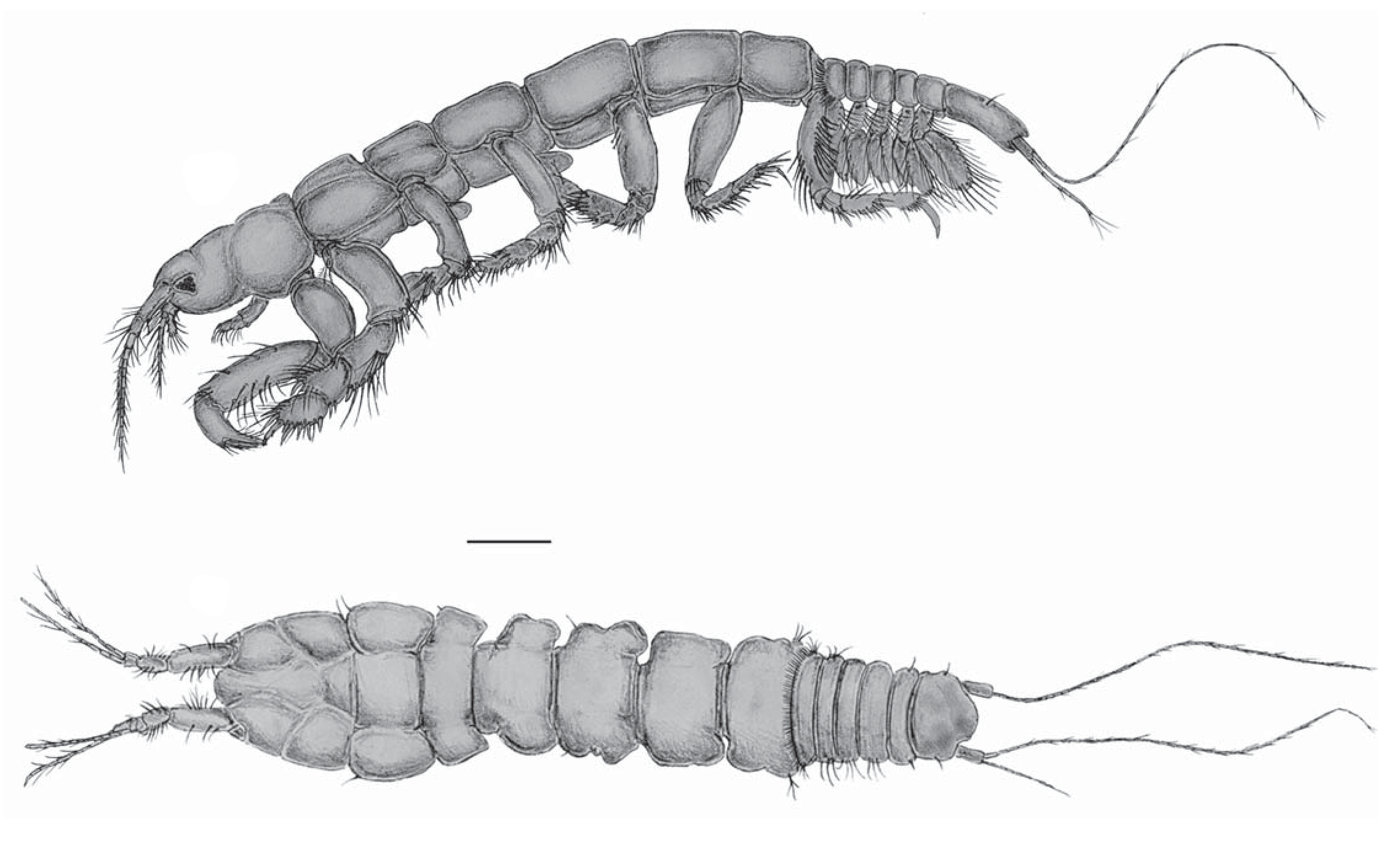
- Holotype (♀) of Longiflagrum amphibium. Top: lateral view. Bottom: dorsal view. Scale bar: 1 mm.

Scientific classification
- Domain: Eukaryota
- Kingdom: Animalia
- Phylum: Arthropoda
- Class: Malacostraca
- Order: Tanaidacea
- Family: Parapseudidae
- Subfamily: Parapseudinae
- Genus: Longiflagrum; Gutu, 1995

Species
- Longiflagrum amphibium Stepień & Błażewicz-Paszkowycz, 2009; Longiflagrum caeruleus (Boesch, 1973); Longiflagrum estuarius (Boesch, 1973); Longiflagrum koyonense Angsupanich, 2004; Longiflagrum nasutus (Nunomura, 2005)

= Longiflagrum =

Genus of crustacean

Longiflagrum is an estuarine genus of crustacean in the order Tanaidacea.

== Ecology ==
All five Longiflagrum species occur in shallow coastal habitats such as the intertidal zone, eelgrass beds and estuaries where the salinity fluctuates over the range 5–34 psu, and they are a frequent and abundant element of the soft-bottom ecosystem.
