= Paratanais =

Scientific classification
- Kingdom: Animalia
- Phylum: Arthropoda
- Clade: Pancrustacea
- Class: Malacostraca
- Order: Tanaidacea
- Family: Paratanaidae
- Subfamily: Paratanaidinae
- Genus: Paratanais; Dana, 1853

Genus of tanaids

Paratanais is a genus of tanaids in the subfamily Paratanaidinae. It contains 28 species.

== Species ==
Paratanais contains the following species:

- Paratanais caterae Bird & Bamber, 2013
- Paratanais clarkae Bird & Bamber, 2000
- Paratanais coelhoi Araujo-Silva & Larsen, 2012
- Paratanais elongatus (Dana, 1849)
- Paratanais euelpis Barnard, 1920
- Paratanais gaspodei Bamber, 2005
- Paratanais hamulus Bird & Bamber, 2013
- Paratanais hessleri Kudinova-Pasternak, 1985
- Paratanais impressus Kussakin & Tzareva, 1972
- Paratanais incomptus Bird & Bamber, 2013
- Paratanais linearis Haswell, 1885
- Paratanais maleficus Larsen, 2001
- Paratanais martinsi Bamber & Costa, 2009
- Paratanais monodi Makkaveeva, 1971
- Paratanais oculatus (Vanhöffen, 1914)
- Paratanais paraoa Bird, 2011
- Paratanais perturbatius Larsen, 2001
- Paratanais pseudomartinsi Larsen, 2012
- Paratanais puia Bird & Bamber, 2013
- Paratanais rigidus Bate & Westwood, 1868
- Paratanais rosadi Morales-Núñez & Heard, 2014
- Paratanais tanyherpes Błażewicz-Paszkowycz & Bamber, 2012
- Paratanais tara Bird, 2011
- Paratanais tenuis Thomson, 1880
- Paratanais vetinari Bamber, 2005
- Paratanais waltsikorai Morales-Núñez & Heard, 2015
- Paratanais wanga Bamber, 2008
