= Karl Georg Herman Lang =

Karl Georg Herman Lang (21 July 1901 – 14 March 1976) was a Swedish zoologist, specialising in crustaceans, especially harpacticoid copepods and tanaids. He was born in Malmö and gained a doctoral degree from the Lund University in 1924. He spent much of his early career working as a teacher in elementary schools in Eslöv, Lund and Stockholm. From 1947 to 1967, Lang worked at the Swedish Museum of Natural History, eventually reaching the position of head of the Section of Invertebrate Zoology. As well as many papers on Harpacticoida up to 1965, and many papers on Tanaidacea throughout his life, Lang also published on Priapulida and Kinorhyncha, and a single paper on isopod crustaceans. He had few students, and his writings were "painfully detailed" and introduced long names such as Paraphyllopodopsyllus and Pseudoleptomesochrella.

== Taxa ==
Karl Lang is commemorated in the genus name Karllangia.

Taxa named by Lang include:

- Microcerberidea Lang, 1961
- Pagurapseudidae Lang, 1970
- Progymnoplea Lang, 1948
