= Akanthophoreidae =

Scientific classification
- Domain: Eukaryota
- Kingdom: Animalia
- Phylum: Arthropoda
- Class: Malacostraca
- Order: Tanaidacea
- Superfamily: Paratanaoidea
- Family: Akanthophoreidae

Synonyms
- Akanthophoreinae

Family of crustaceans

Akanthophoreidae is a family of crustaceans belonging to the order Tanaidacea.

Genera:

- Akanthophoreus Sieg, 1986
- Brixia (crustacean) Jóźwiak, Drumm, Bird & Błażewicz, 2018
- Chauliopleona Dojiri & Sieg, 1997
- Mimicarhaphura Sieg, 1986
- Parakanthophoreus Larsen & Araújo-Silva, 2014
- Paraleptognathia Kudinova-Pasternak, 1981
- Saurotipleona Bird, 2015
- Stenotanais Bird & Holdich, 1984
- Tumidochelia Knight, Larsen & Heard, 2003
