= Nanocopia =

Scientific classification
- Domain: Eukaryota
- Kingdom: Animalia
- Phylum: Arthropoda
- Class: Copepoda
- Order: Platycopioida
- Family: Platycopiidae
- Genus: Nanocopia; Fosshagen, 1988
- Species: N. minuta

Binomial name
- Nanocopia minuta Fosshagen, 1988

Genus of crustaceans

Nanocopia is a genus of copepods in the family Platycopiidae. There is at least one described species in Nanocopia, Nanocopia minuta.
