= Gigantapseudes =

Scientific classification
- Domain: Eukaryota
- Kingdom: Animalia
- Phylum: Arthropoda
- Class: Malacostraca
- Order: Tanaidacea
- Family: Gigantapseudidae
- Genus: Gigantapseudes; Kudinova-Pasternak, 1978

Genus of crustaceans

Gigantapseudes is a genus of crustaceans belonging to the monotypic family Gigantapseudidae.

The species of this genus are found in Malesia.

Species:

- Gigantapseudes adactylus Kudinova-Pasternak, 1978
- Gigantapseudes maximus Gamô, 1984
