= Pseudozeuxidae =

Scientific classification
- Domain: Eukaryota
- Kingdom: Animalia
- Phylum: Arthropoda
- Class: Malacostraca
- Order: Tanaidacea
- Superfamily: Paratanaoidea
- Family: Pseudozeuxidae

Family of crustaceans

Pseudozeuxidae is a family of crustaceans belonging to the order Tanaidacea.

Genera:

- Charbeitanais Bamber & Bird, 1997
- Haimormus Kakui & Fujita, 2018
- Pseudozeuxo Sieg, 1982
