= Typhlotanaidae =

Scientific classification
- Domain: Eukaryota
- Kingdom: Animalia
- Phylum: Arthropoda
- Class: Malacostraca
- Order: Tanaidacea
- Superfamily: Paratanaoidea
- Family: Typhlotanaidae

Family of crustaceans

Typhlotanaidae is a family of crustaceans belonging to the order Tanaidacea.

Genera:

- Antiplotanais Bamber, 2008
- Aremus Segadilha, Gellert & Błażewicz, 2018
- Dimorphognathia Sieg, 1986
- Larsenotanais Blazewicz-Paszkowycz, 2007
- Meromonakantha Sieg, 1986
- Obesutanais Larsen, Blazewicz-Paszkowycz & Cunha, 2006
- Paratyphlotanais Kudinova-Pasternak & Pasternak, 1978
- Peraeospinosus Sieg, 1986
- Pulcherella Blazewicz-Paszkowycz, 2007
- Targaryenella Błażewicz & Segadilha, 2019
- Torquella Blazewicz-Paszkowycz, 2007
- Typhlamia Blazewicz-Paszkowycz, 2007
- Typhlotanais Sars, 1882
- Typhlotanaoides Sieg, 1983
