= Sphyrapodidae =

Scientific classification
- Domain: Eukaryota
- Kingdom: Animalia
- Phylum: Arthropoda
- Class: Malacostraca
- Order: Tanaidacea
- Family: Sphyrapodidae

Synonyms
- Sphyrapidae

Family of crustaceans

Sphyrapodidae is a family of crustaceans belonging to the order Tanaidacea.

Genera:

- Ansphyrapus Gutu, 2001
- Francapseudes Bacescu, 1981
- Kudinopasternakia Gutu, 1991
- Poligarida Bamber & Marshall, 2013
- Pseudosphyrapus Gutu, 1980
- Sphyrapoides Gutu & Iliffe, 1998
- Sphyrapus Norman & Stebbing, 1886
- Sphyrapus Sars, 1882
- Wandogarida Wi & Kang, 2018
