= Nototanaidae =

Scientific classification
- Domain: Eukaryota
- Kingdom: Animalia
- Phylum: Arthropoda
- Class: Malacostraca
- Order: Tanaidacea
- Superfamily: Paratanaoidea
- Family: Nototanaidae

Synonyms
- Nototanaididae

Family of crustaceans

Nototanaidae is a family of crustaceans belonging to the order Tanaidacea.

Genera:

- Birdotanais Kakui & Angsupanich, 2012
- Gamboa Bamber, 2012
- Leptotanais
- Nesotanais Shiino, 1968
- Nototanais Richardson, 1906
- Nototanoides Sieg & Heard, 1985
- Paranesotanais Larsen & Shimomura, 2008
- Stachyops Bird, 2012
