= Apseudella =

Scientific classification
- Domain: Eukaryota
- Kingdom: Animalia
- Phylum: Arthropoda
- Class: Malacostraca
- Order: Tanaidacea
- Family: Apseudellidae
- Genus: Apseudella; Lang, 1968
- Species: A. typica

Binomial name
- Apseudella typica Lang, 1968

Family of crustaceans

Apseudella is a monotypic genus of crustaceans belonging to the monotypic family Apseudellidae. The only species is Apseudella typica.

The species is found in Eastern Africa.
