= Neotanaidae =

Scientific classification
- Domain: Eukaryota
- Kingdom: Animalia
- Phylum: Arthropoda
- Class: Malacostraca
- Order: Tanaidacea
- Family: Neotanaidae

Synonyms
- Neotanidae

Family of crustaceans

Neotanaidae is a family of crustaceans belonging to the order Tanaidacea.

Genera:

- Carololangia Gardiner, 1975
- Harpotanais Wolff, 1956
- Herpotanais Wolff, 1956
- Neotanais Beddard, 1886
- Venusticrus Gardiner, 1975
