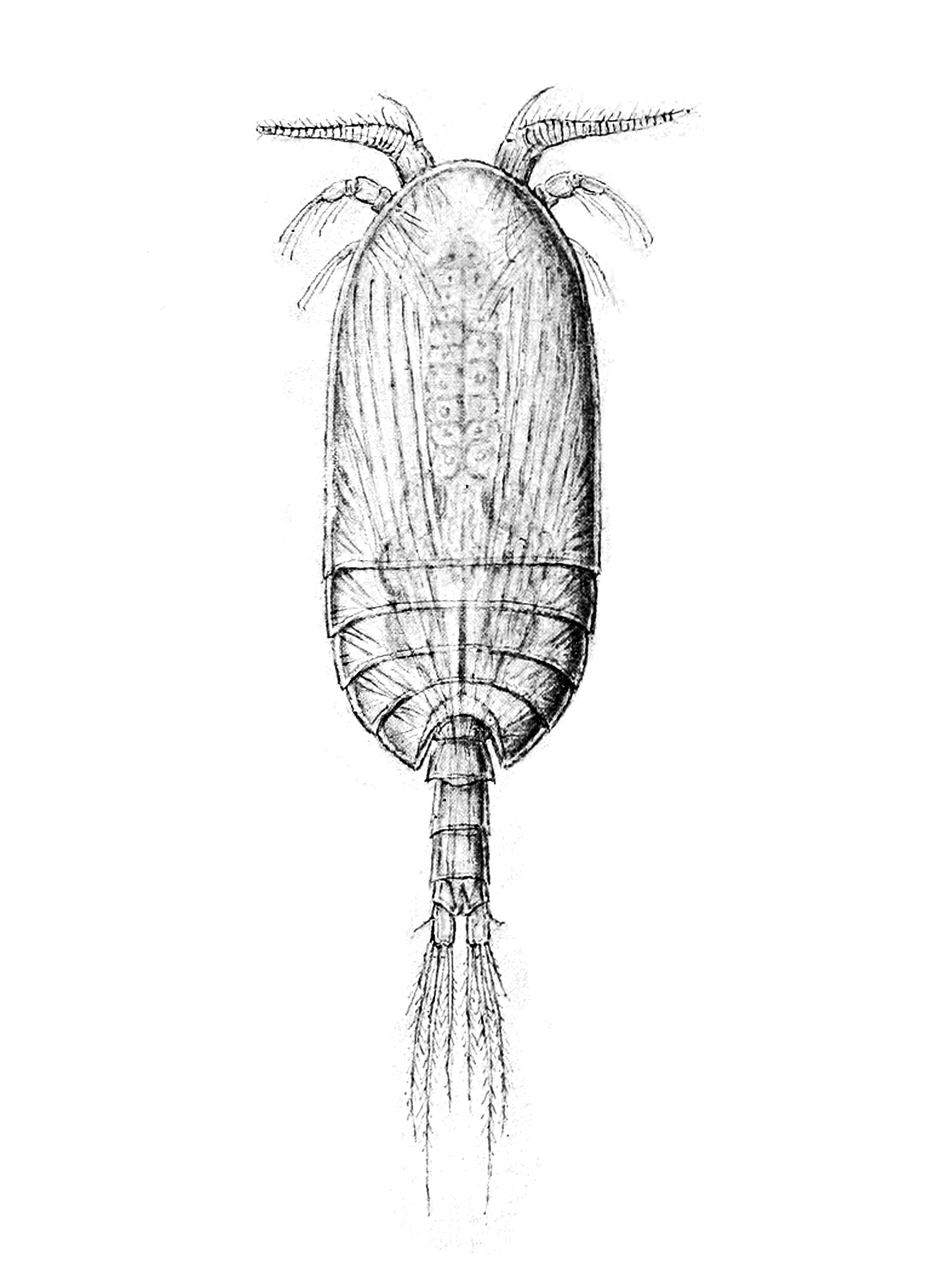
- Platycopia perplexa

Scientific classification
- Kingdom: Animalia
- Phylum: Arthropoda
- Clade: Pancrustacea
- Class: Copepoda
- Infraclass: Progymnoplea; Lang, 1948
- Order: Platycopioida; Fosshagen, 1985
- Family: Platycopiidae; G. O. Sars, 1911

Genera
- Antrisocopia Fosshagen, 1985; Nanocopia Fosshagen, 1988; Platycopia G. O. Sars, 1911; Sarsicopia Martínez Arbizu, 1997

= Platycopiidae =

Family of crustaceans

Platycopiidae is a family of copepods. Until the description of Nanocopia in 1988, it contained the single genus Platycopia. It now contains four genera, three of which are monotypic; the exception is Platycopia, with 8 species.

== Systematics ==
The family Platycopiidae was erected by Georg Ossian Sars when he described the new species P. perplexa, and included it in the order Calanoida. In 1948, Karl Georg Herman Lang erected a new suborder, Progymnoplea, for the family, and in 1985, Audun Fosshagen & Thomas Iliffe created the order Platycopioida to contain the Platycopiidae, initially placed alongside Calanoida in the superorder Gymnoplea. Most recently, Huys & Boxshall inferred that Platycopiidae was the earliest branching copepod lineage, making it the sister taxon to all other copepods; they therefore raised Progymnoplea to the rank of infraclass, to accommodate Platycopioida alone, with all other copepods being placed in the Neocopepoda.

Members of the Platycopiidae have a primitive form, thought to be similar to the most recent common ancestor of all copepods. Few synapormorphies have been found to unite the family, but they include the presence of a second dorsal seta (hair) on particular segments of the legs. They share with calanoid copepods the possession of Von Vaupel Klein's organ, a sensory organ near the base of the first swimming leg.

== Members ==
Antrisocopia prehensilis Fosshagen, 1985 is a critically endangered species from a limestone anchialine cave in Bermuda, known from only five mature specimens.

Nanocopia minuta Fosshagen, 1988 is a critically endangered species from the same anchialine cave as Antrisocopia, and is known from only two specimens.

Sarsicopia polaris Martínez Arbizu, 1997 was collected in 1993 from a depth of 534 metres (1,752 ft) in the Barents Sea.

Platycopia comprises eight species, distributed in the North Sea, the eastern seaboard of North America, the Bahamas, Mauritania and Japan. The first species to be described was P. perplexa, named by Georg Ossian Sars in 1911.
