= Kalliapseudidae =

Scientific classification
- Kingdom: Animalia
- Phylum: Arthropoda
- Clade: Pancrustacea
- Class: Malacostraca
- Order: Tanaidacea
- Family: Kalliapseudidae

Family of crustaceans

Kalliapseudidae is a family of crustaceans belonging to the order Tanaidacea.

== Genera ==
Genera:

- Acutihumerus Gutu, 2006
- Bacescapseudes Gutu, 1981
- Cristapseudes Bacescu, 1980
