= Antrisocopia =

Scientific classification
- Domain: Eukaryota
- Kingdom: Animalia
- Phylum: Arthropoda
- Class: Copepoda
- Order: Platycopioida
- Family: Platycopiidae
- Genus: Antrisocopia; Fosshagen, 1985
- Species: A. prehensilis

Binomial name
- Antrisocopia prehensilis Fosshagen, 1985

Genus of crustaceans

Antrisocopia is a genus of copepods in the family Platycopiidae. There is at least one described species in Antrisocopia, Antrisocopia prehensilis.
