= Tanais (crustacean) =

Scientific classification
- Domain: Eukaryota
- Kingdom: Animalia
- Phylum: Arthropoda
- Class: Malacostraca
- Order: Tanaidacea
- Family: Tanaididae
- Subfamily: Tanaidinae
- Genus: Tanais; Latreille, 1831

Synonyms
- Anisocheirus Westwood, 1832; Crossurus Rathke, 1843

Genus of crustaceans

Tanais is a genus of malacostracans in the family Tanaididae. There are about 11 described species in Tanais.

== Species ==
These 11 species belong to the genus Tanais:

- Tanais dulongii (Audouin, 1826)^{i c g b}
- Tanais gayi Nicolet, 1849^{i c g}
- Tanais grimaldii Dollfus, 1897^{i c g}
- Tanais loricatus Bate, 1864^{i c g}
- Tanais macrocheles Nicolet, 1849^{i c g}
- Tanais nuwalianensis Tzeng & Hsueh, 2014^{c g}
- Tanais pongo Bamber, 2005^{c g}
- Tanais portiatius^{i g}
- Tanais tenuicornis (Haswell, 1882)^{i}
- Tanais tinhauae Bamber and Bird, 1997^{i c g}
- Tanais vanis M. A. Miller, 1940^{i c g}

Data sources: i = ITIS, c = Catalogue of Life, g = GBIF, b = Bugguide.net
