= Platycopia =

Scientific classification
- Domain: Eukaryota
- Kingdom: Animalia
- Phylum: Arthropoda
- Class: Copepoda
- Order: Platycopioida
- Family: Platycopiidae
- Genus: Platycopia; Sars, 1911

Genus of crustaceans

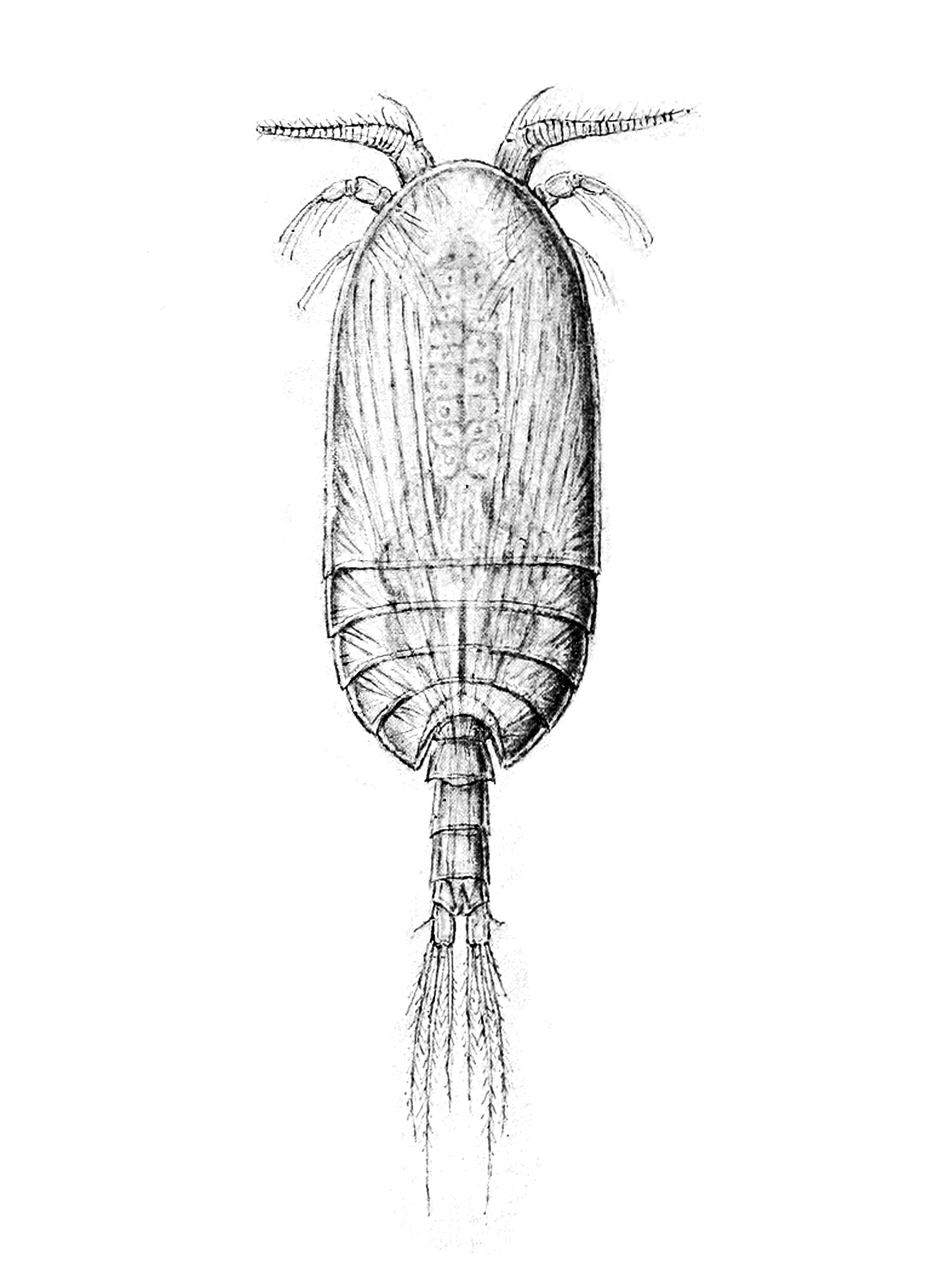
Platycopia perplexa Sars, 1911

Platycopia is a genus of Arthropods in the family Platycopiidae. There are about eight described species in Platycopia.

== Species ==
These eight species belong to the genus Platycopia:

- Platycopia compacta Ohtsuka, Soh & Ueda, 1998
- Platycopia inornata Fosshagen, 1972
- Platycopia orientalis Ohtsuka & Boxshall, 1994
- Platycopia perplexa G. O. Sars, 1911
- Platycopia pygmaea G. O. Sars, 1919
- Platycopia robusta Andronov, 1985
- Platycopia sarsi M. S. Wilson, 1946
- Platycopia tumida (C. B. Wilson, 1935)
