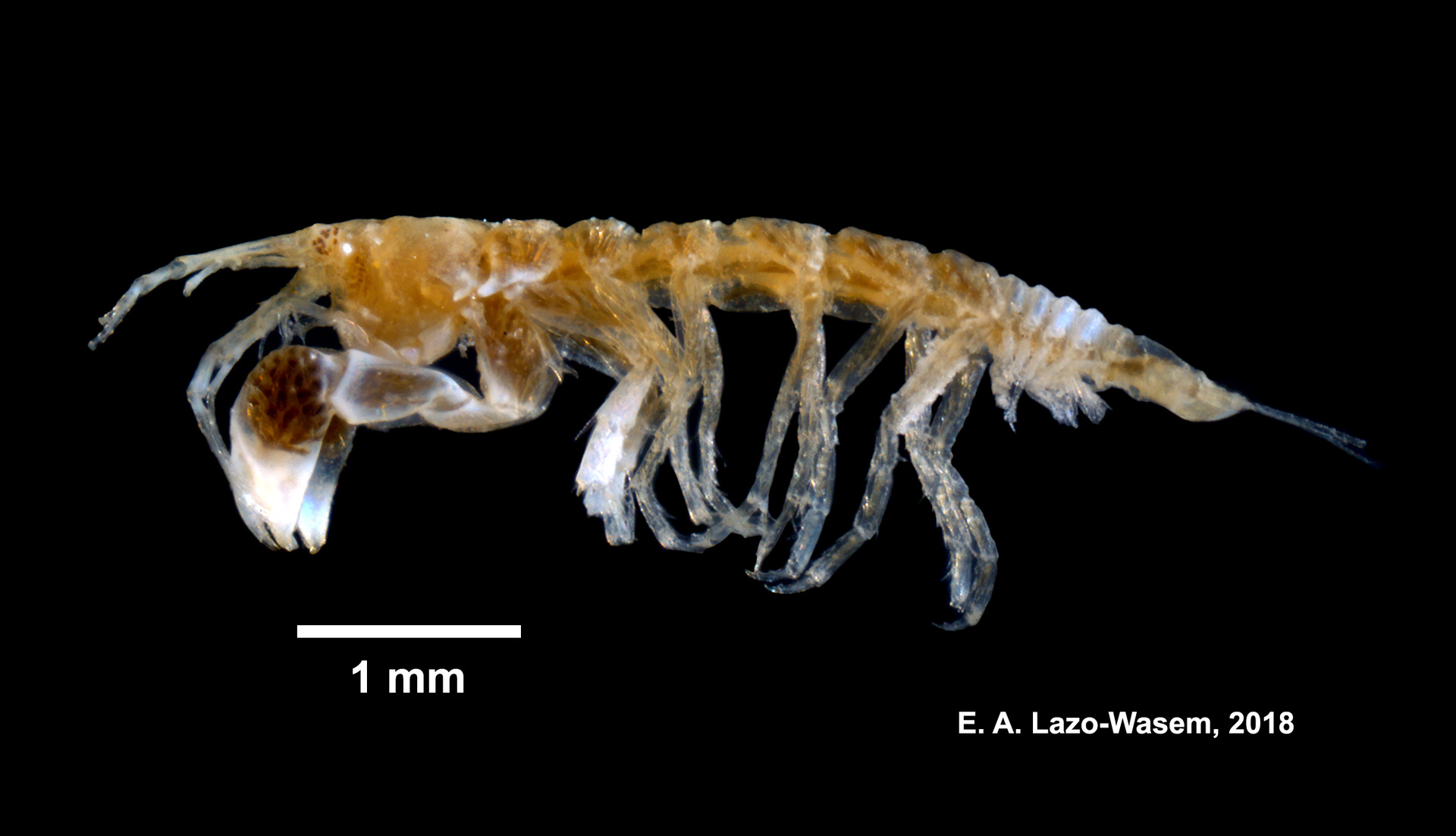
- Apseudes propinquus (YPM IZ 003255.CR)

Scientific classification
- Domain: Eukaryota
- Kingdom: Animalia
- Phylum: Arthropoda
- Class: Malacostraca
- Order: Tanaidacea
- Family: Metapseudidae

= Metapseudidae =

Family of crustaceans

Metapseudidae is a family of crustaceans belonging to the order Tanaidacea.

== Genera ==
Genera:

- Apseudomorpha Miller, 1940
- Apseudomorpha Sieg, 1980
- Bamberus Stępień & Błażewicz-Paszkowycz, 2013
