= Whiteleggiidae =

Scientific classification
- Domain: Eukaryota
- Kingdom: Animalia
- Phylum: Arthropoda
- Class: Malacostraca
- Order: Tanaidacea
- Family: Whiteleggiidae

Family of crustaceans

Whiteleggiidae is a family of crustaceans belonging to the order Tanaidacea.

Genera:

- Pseudowhiteleggia Lang, 1970
- Whiteleggia Lang, 1970
