= Karllangia =

Scientific classification
- Kingdom: Animalia
- Phylum: Arthropoda
- Class: Copepoda
- Order: Harpacticoida
- Family: Parastenheliidae
- Genus: Karllangia; Noodt, 1964

Type species
- Karllangia arenicola Noodt, 1964

Genus of crustaceans

Karllangia is a genus of marine copepods. Its name commemorates the Swedish carcinologist Karl Georg Herman Lang. The genus contains five species:

- Karllangia arenicola Noodt, 1964
- Karllangia obscura Mielke, 1994
- Karllangia ornatissima (Monard, 1935)
- Karllangia psammophila Wells, 1967
- Karllangia pulchra Mielke, 1994
