= Agathotanaidae =

Scientific classification
- Domain: Eukaryota
- Kingdom: Animalia
- Phylum: Arthropoda
- Class: Malacostraca
- Order: Tanaidacea
- Superfamily: Paratanaoidea
- Family: Agathotanaidae; Lang, 1971

Family of crustaceans

Agathotanaidae is a family of crustaceans belonging to the order Tanaidacea.

Genera:

- Agathotanais Hansen, 1913
- Allodaposia Sieg, 1986
- Bunburia Jóźwiak & Jakiel, 2012
- Metagathotanais Bird & Holdich, 1988
- Ozagathus Błażewicz-Paszkowycz & Bamber, 2012
- Paragathotanais Lang, 1971
- Paranarthrura Hansen, 1913
