= Tanai (disambiguation) =

The Tanai are a tribe in Afghanistan

Tanai may also refer to:

- Tanai Township, a township of Myitkyina District in the Kachin State of Burma
- Tanai, Myanmar the principal town of Tanai Township

== People with the surname ==
- Shahnawaz Tanai, former communist general
- Sara Levi-Tanai (c. 1910–2005), Israeli choreographer and songwriter

== See also ==
- Tanais (disambiguation)
