= Sarsicopia =

Scientific classification
- Domain: Eukaryota
- Kingdom: Animalia
- Phylum: Arthropoda
- Class: Copepoda
- Order: Platycopioida
- Family: Platycopiidae
- Genus: Sarsicopia; Martínez Arbizu, 1997
- Species: S. polaris

Binomial name
- Sarsicopia polaris Martínez Arbizu, 1997

Genus of crustaceans

Sarsicopia is a genus of Copepods in the family Platycopiidae. There is at least one described species in Sarsicopia, S. polaris.
