= Tanzanapseudidae =

Scientific classification
- Kingdom: Animalia
- Phylum: Arthropoda
- Class: Malacostraca
- Order: Tanaidacea
- Family: Tanzanapseudidae

Family of crustaceans

Tanzanapseudidae is a family of crustaceans belonging to the order Tanaidacea.

Genera:

- Acanthapseudes Roman, 1976
- Tanzanapseudes Bacescu, 1975
