= Anarthruridae =

Scientific classification
- Domain: Eukaryota
- Kingdom: Animalia
- Phylum: Arthropoda
- Class: Malacostraca
- Order: Tanaidacea
- Superfamily: Paratanaoidea
- Family: Anarthruridae; Lang, 1971

Genera
- See text

Synonyms
- Anarthrurinae Lang, 1971; Anarthrurini Sieg, 1986; Leptognathiinae Sieg, 1986; Nesotanainae Sieg, 1976

Family of crustaceans

Anarthruridae is a family of crustaceans belonging to the order Tanaidacea.

== Genera ==
Genera:

- Abrotanais Gellert & Błażewicz, 2018
- Acinoproskelos Bamber & Błażewicz-Paszkowycz, 2013
- Anarthrura Sars, 1882
- Anarthrurella Bird, 2004
- Anarthruropsis Lang, 1968
- Anisopechys Bird, 2004
- Crenicarpus Drumm & Bird, 2016
- Ithyomus Bird, 2004
- Keska Błażewicz-Paszkowycz, Bamber & Jóźwiak, 2013
- Macilenta Gellert & Błażewicz, 2018
- Olokun Jóźwiak & Błażewicz, 2017
- Siphonolabrum Lang, 1972
- Siphonolabrum Lang, 1971 (nomen nudum)
- Synanarthrura Bird, 2004
- Thorkelius Bird, 2004
- Tsuranarthrura Kakui & Tomioka, 2018
- Waki Gellert & Błażewicz, 2018
