= Tanaellidae =

Scientific classification
- Domain: Eukaryota
- Kingdom: Animalia
- Phylum: Arthropoda
- Class: Malacostraca
- Order: Tanaidacea
- Superfamily: Paratanaoidea
- Family: Tanaellidae; Larsen & Wilson, 2002

Genera
- See text

Family of crustacean

Tanaellidae is a family of malacostracan crustacean.

== Genera ==
According to the World Register of Marine Species, the following genera are accepted within Tanaellidae:

- Araphura Bird & Holdich, 1984
- Arhaphuroides Sieg, 1986
- Arthrura Kudinova-Pasternak, 1966
- Inconnivus Błażewicz-Paszkowycz & Bamber, 2012
- Tanaella Norman & Stebbing, 1886
