= Pagurapseudidae =

Scientific classification
- Kingdom: Animalia
- Phylum: Arthropoda
- Clade: Pancrustacea
- Class: Malacostraca
- Order: Tanaidacea
- Suborder: Apseudomorpha
- Superfamily: Apseudoidea
- Family: Pagurapseudidae; Lang, 1970

Subfamilies
- Hodometricinae Gutu, 1981; Pagurapseudinae Lang, 1970

Family of crustaceans

Pagurapseudidae is a family of crustaceans in the order Tanaidacea. Like hermit crabs, they inhabit empty gastropod shells, but can be told apart from hermit crabs by the lack of a carapace, revealing the segmentation of the thorax, and by the greater number of legs: hermit crabs have five pairs of legs, of which the first has large claws, and the last is highly reduced, while in Pagurapseudidae, there is one pair of claws, plus six further walking legs.

The family Pagurapseudidae contains the following subfamilies and genera:

- Hodometricinae Gutu, 1981

- Hodometrica Miller, 1940
- Indoapseudes Bacescu, 1976
- Parapagurapseudopsis Brum, 1973
- Similipedia Gutu, 1989

- Pagurapseudinae Lang, 1970

- Macrolabrum Bacescu, 1976
- Pagurapseudes Whitelegge, 1901
- Pagurotanais Bouvier, 1918
