= Parapseudidae =

Scientific classification
- Domain: Eukaryota
- Kingdom: Animalia
- Phylum: Arthropoda
- Class: Malacostraca
- Order: Tanaidacea
- Family: Parapseudidae

Synonyms
- Anuropodidae

Family of crustaceans

Parapseudidae is a family of crustaceans belonging to the order Tanaidacea.

== Subdivisions ==
According to the World Register of Marine Species, the following subfamilies and genera are accepted within Paratanaoidea:

- Pakistanapseudinae Gutu, 2008
  - Actenos Bamber, 2013
  - Biropalostoma Gutu & Angsupanich, 2004
  - Leptolicoa Gutu, 2006
  - Pakistanapseudes Bacescu, 1978
  - Platylicoa Gutu, 2006
  - Ramosiseta Gutu, 2008
  - Swireapseudes Bamber, 1997
  - Thaicungella Gutu & Angsupanich, 2004
  - Unguispinosus Gutu, 2008
- Parapseudinae Gutu, 2008
  - Akanthoparapseudes Heard & Morales-Núñez, 2011
  - Aponychos Bamber, Chatterjee & Marshall, 2012
  - Ascumnella Gutu & Heard, 2002
  - Brachylicoa Gutu, 2006
  - Ctenapseudes Bamber, Ariyananda & Silva, 1997
  - Discapseudes Bacescu & Gutu, 1975
  - Gutuapseudes Edgar, 1997
  - Hainanius Bamber, 1999
  - Halmyrapseudes Bacescu & Gutu, 1974
  - Longiflagrum Gutu, 1995
  - Longipedis Larsen & Shimomura, 2006
  - Parapseudes Sars, 1882
  - Podictenius Gutu, 2006
  - Pseudoapseudes Gutu, 1981
  - Pseudohalmyrapseudes Larsen & Hansknecht, 2004
  - Remexudes Błażewicz-Paszkowycz & Bamber, 2007
  - Saltipedis Gutu, 1995
