= Tanaididae =

Scientific classification
- Domain: Eukaryota
- Kingdom: Animalia
- Phylum: Arthropoda
- Class: Malacostraca
- Order: Tanaidacea
- Suborder: Tanaidomorpha
- Superfamily: Tanaidoidea
- Family: Tanaididae; Nobili, 1906

Synonyms
- Tanaidae

Family of crustaceans

Tanaididae is a family of malacostracans in the order Tanaidacea. There are about 19 genera and more than 90 described species in Tanaididae.

== Genera ==
These 19 genera belong to the family Tanaididae:

- Allotanais Shiino, 1978
- Anatanais Nordenstam, 1930
- Arctotanais Sieg, 1980
- Austrotanais Edgar, 2008
- Aviatanais Bamber, 2005
- Hexapleomera Dudich, 1931
- Langitanais Sieg, 1976
- Mekon Bamber & Boxshall, 2006
- Monoditanais Sieg, 1980
- Pancoloides Sieg, 1980
- Pancolus Richardson, 1905
- Parasinelobus Sieg, 1980
- Protanais Sieg, 1980
- Sinelobus Sieg, 1980
- Singularitanais Sieg, 1980
- Synaptotanais Sieg, 1980
- Tanais Latreille, 1831
- Zeuxo Templeton, 1840
- Zeuxoides Sieg, 1980
