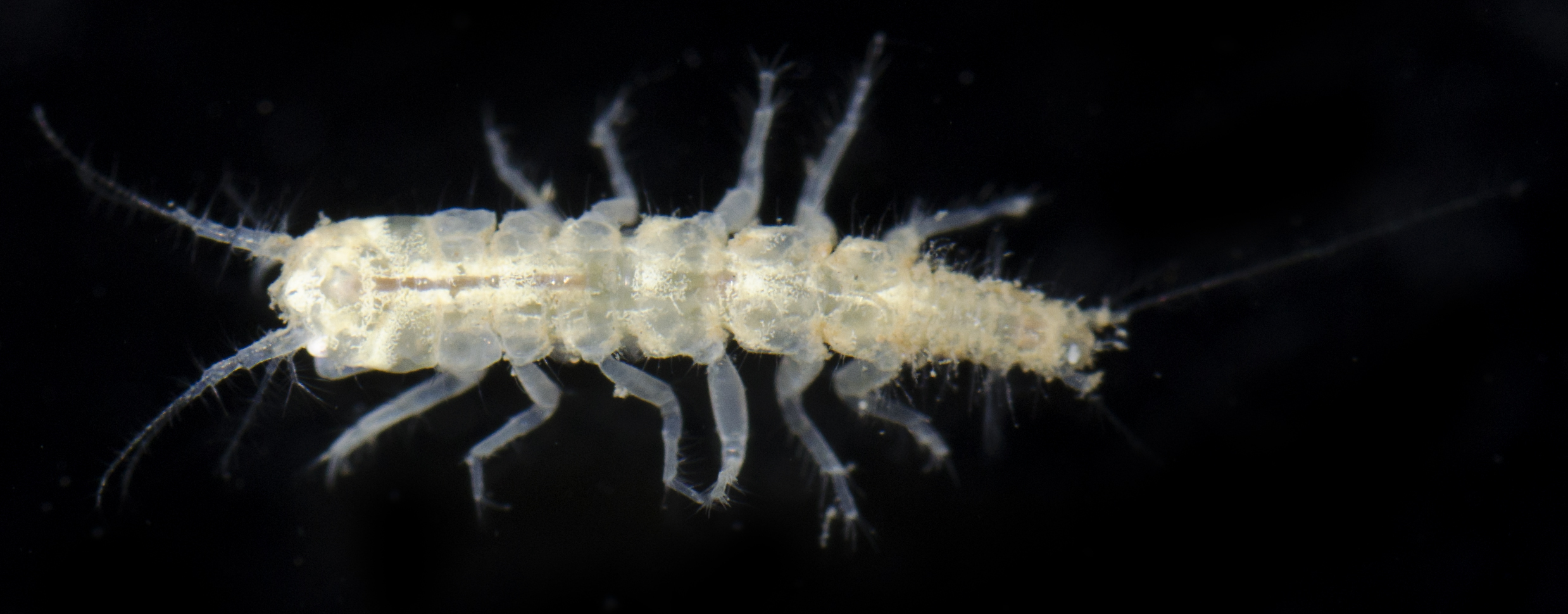

Scientific classification
- Kingdom: Animalia
- Phylum: Arthropoda
- Class: Malacostraca
- Order: Tanaidacea
- Family: Apseudidae; Leach, 1814

= Apseudidae =

Family of crustaceans

Apseudidae is a family of crustaceans belonging to the order Tanaidacea.

Apseudids are shrimp-like in appearance. They are widely distributed throughout the benthic zone, in both coastal and deep-sea environments.

== Genera ==
Over 110 species are known, across over 26 genera. Most known species are members of the genus Apseudes.

Genera:

- Apseudes Leach, 1814
- Apseudopsis Norman, 1899
- Atlantapseudes Bacescu, 1978
- Barapseudia Quayle, 2016
- Bunakenia Gutu, 1995
- Carpoapseudes Lang, 1968
- Fageapseudes Bacescu & Gutu, 1971
