= Parastenheliidae =

Scientific classification
- Domain: Eukaryota
- Kingdom: Animalia
- Phylum: Arthropoda
- Class: Copepoda
- Order: Harpacticoida
- Family: Parastenheliidae

Synonyms
- Parastentheliidae

Family of crustaceans

Parastenheliidae is a family of copepods belonging to the order Harpacticoida.

Genera:

- Foweya Gee, 2006
- Karllangia Noodt, 1964
- Paraleptomesochra Wells, 1967
- Parastenhelia Thompson & Scott, 1903
- Pawulobathynella
- Psammoleptomesochra Mielke, 1994
