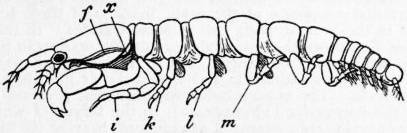

Scientific classification
- Kingdom: Animalia
- Phylum: Arthropoda
- Clade: Pancrustacea
- Class: Malacostraca
- Order: Tanaidacea
- Superfamily: Paratanaoidea
- Family: Leptocheliidae; Lang, 1973

= Leptocheliidae =

Family of crustaceans

Leptocheliidae is a family of malacostracans in the order Tanaidacea. There are more than 30 genera and 140 described species in Leptocheliidae.

== Genera ==
These 32 genera belong to the family Leptocheliidae:

- Alloleptochelia Gutu, 2016
- Antiparus Gutu, 2016
- Araleptochelia Błażewicz-Paszkowycz & Bamber, 2012
- Bassoleptochelia Błażewicz-Paszkowycz & Bamber, 2012
- Bathyleptochelia Larsen, 2003
- Brunarus Bamber & Marshall, 2015
- Cacoheterotanais Morales-Núñez & Heard, 2015
- Catenarius Bamber, 2008
- Chondrochelia Gutu, 2016
- Cocotanais Esquete, 2013
- Ektraleptochelia Bamber & Marshall, 2015
- Grallatotanais Gutu & Iliffe, 2001
- Hargeria Lang, 1973 (Note: Hargeria is considered by some to be an invalid genus but has more recently been validated by some researchers.)
- Heterotanais G. O. Sars, 1882
- Heterotanoides Sieg, 1978
- Intermedichelia Gutu, 1996
- Kalloleptochelia Gutu, 2016
- Konarus Bamber, 2006
- Larsmentia Bamber & Marshall, 2015
- Leptochelia Dana, 1849
- Makassaritanais Gutu, 2012
- Makraleptochelia Araujo-Silva & Larsen, 2012
- Mesotanais Dollfus, 1897
- Metaleptochelia Gutu, 2016
- Neoleptochelia Gutu, 2011
- Nuberis Bamber & Marshall, 2015
- Ogleus Morales-Núñez & Heard, 2013
- Parakonarus Bird, 2011
- Paraleptochelia Gutu, 2016
- Poorea Edgar, 2012
- Pseudoleptochelia Lang, 1973
- Pseudonototanais Lang, 1973
