= Pseudotanaidae =

Scientific classification
- Domain: Eukaryota
- Kingdom: Animalia
- Phylum: Arthropoda
- Class: Malacostraca
- Order: Tanaidacea
- Family: Pseudotanaidae; Sieg, 1976
- Subfamily: Pseudotanainae; Sieg, 1977

Synonyms
- Pseudotanaididae

Family of crustaceans

Pseudotanaidae is a family of crustaceans belonging to the order Tanaidacea. The family contains one subfamily, Pseudotanainae, which contains five genera.

Genera:

- Akanthinotanais Sieg, 1977
- Beksitanais Jakiel, Palero & Błażewicz, 2019
- Mystriocentrus Bird & Holdich, 1989
- Parapseudotanais Bird & Holdich, 1989
- Pseudotanais Sars, 1882
