= Paratanaidae =

Scientific classification
- Kingdom: Animalia
- Phylum: Arthropoda
- Clade: Pancrustacea
- Class: Malacostraca
- Order: Tanaidacea
- Family: Paratanaidae

Synonyms
- Paratanaididae

Family of crustaceans

Paratanaidae is a family of crustaceans belonging to the order Tanaidacea.

== Genera ==
Genera:

- Bathytanais Beddard, 1886
- Pseudobathytanais Kudinova-Pasternak, 1990
- 'Gammarus'
- Metatanais Shiino, 1951
- Acallocheirus Bird & Bamber, 2013
- Aparatanais Bird & Bamber, 2013
- Atemtanais Bird, 2011
- Paratanais Dana, 1853
- Penteparatanais Bird & Bamber, 2013
- Periparatanais Bird, 2019
- Triparatanais Bamber & Chatterjee, 2010
- Xeplenois Bamber, 2005
