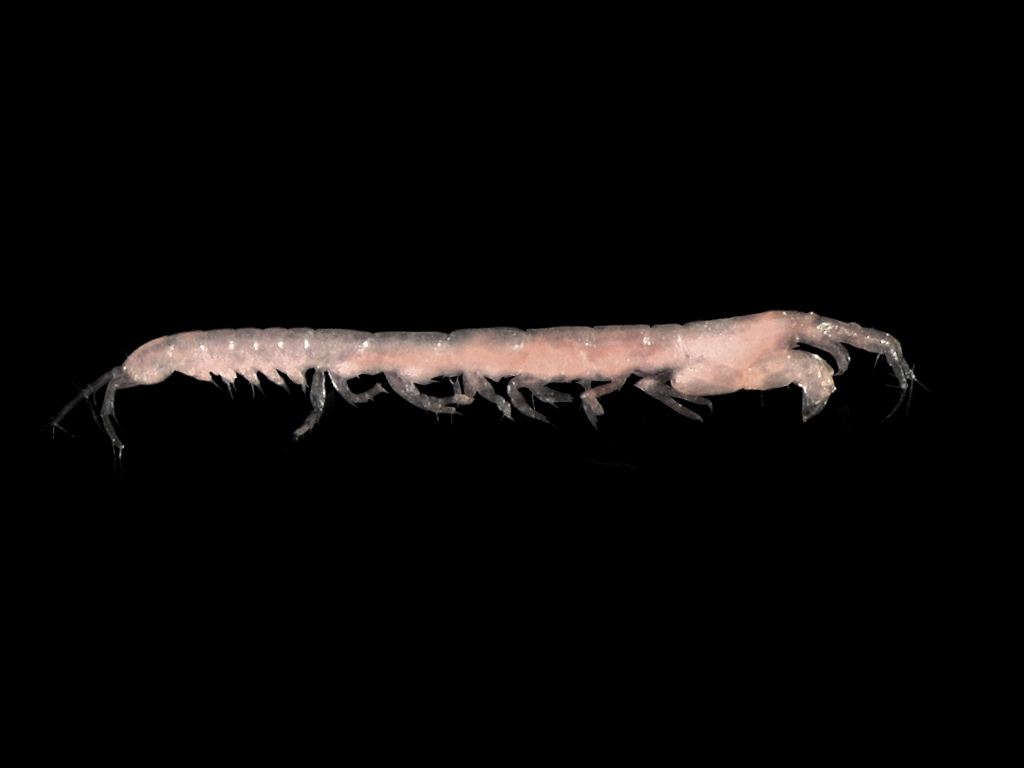
- Tanaissus lilljeborgi

Scientific classification
- Domain: Eukaryota
- Kingdom: Animalia
- Phylum: Arthropoda
- Class: Malacostraca
- Order: Tanaidacea
- Suborder: Tanaidomorpha; Sieg, 1980

Superfamily
- Neotanaoidea Sieg, 1980; Paratanaoidea Lang, 1949; Tanaidoidea Nobili, 1906

= Tanaidomorpha =

Suborder of crustacean

Tanaidomorpha is a suborder of malacostracan crustacean.
