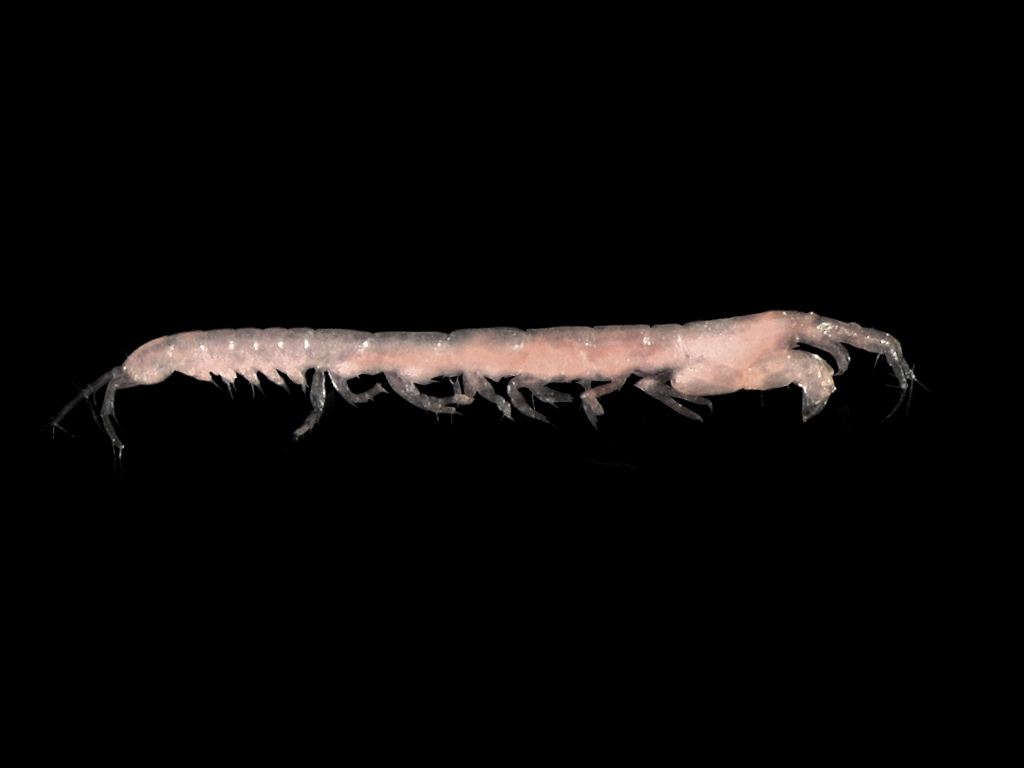
- Tanaissus lilljeborgi (a tanaid from the North Sea)

Scientific classification
- Kingdom: Animalia
- Phylum: Arthropoda
- Class: Malacostraca
- Superorder: Peracarida
- Order: Tanaidacea; Dana, 1849

Suborders
- Anthracocaridomorpha †; Apseudomorpha; Tanaidomorpha

= Tanaidacea =

Tanaidacea Temporal range: Carboniferous–Recent

Order of crustaceans

The crustacean order Tanaidacea (known as tanaids) make up a minor group within the class Malacostraca. There are about 940 species in this order.

== Description ==
Tanaids are small, shrimp-like creatures ranging from 0.5 to 120 millimetres (0.020 to 4.7 in) in adult size, with most species being from 2 to 5 millimetres (0.08 to 0.2 in). Their carapace covers the first two segments of the thorax. There are three pairs of limbs on the thorax; a small pair of maxillipeds, a pair of large clawed gnathopods, and a pair of pereiopods adapted for burrowing into the mud. The remaining six thoracic segments each bear a pair of pereiopods, and each of the first five abdominal segments normally carry pleopods. The final segment is fused with the telson and carries a pair of uropods.

The gills lie on the inner surface of the carapace. The thoracic limbs wash water towards the mouth, filtering out small particles of food with the mouthparts or maxillipeds. Some species actively hunt prey, either as their only food source, or in combination with filter feeding.

== Habitat ==
Most are marine, but a handful are also found in freshwater. They live buried in bottom sediments, sometimes in self-built tubes.

== Life cycle ==
Tanaids do not undergo a true planktonic stage. The early developmental period is spent while young are within the marsupium of the mother. Subsequently, post-larvae, called mancas, emerge as epibenthic forms. Some species are hermaphroditic.

== Taxonomy ==
The oldest representatives of the group are known from the Carboniferous, with modern forms emerging during the Mesozoic.

The order Tanaidacea is divided into the following sub-orders, superfamilies and families:

- Suborder Anthracocaridomorpha †
    - Family Anthracocarididae † Brooks, 1962 emend. Schram, 1979
    - Family Niveotanaidae † Polz, 2005
- Suborder Apseudomorpha
  - Superfamily Apseudoidea Leach, 1814 (incl. former superfamily Jurapseudoidea)
    - Family Apseudellidae Gutu, 1972
    - Family Apseudidae Leach, 1814
    - Family Eucryptocaridae Heard et al. 2020
    - Family Gigantapseudidae Kudinova-Pasternak, 1978
    - Family Jurapseudidae † Schram, Sieg & Malzahn, 1986
    - Family Kalliapseudidae Lang, 1956
    - Family Metapseudidae Lang, 1970
    - Family Numbakullidae Gutu & Heard, 2002
    - Family Ophthalmapseudidae Heard et al. 2020
    - Family Pagurapseudidae Lang, 1970
    - Family Pagurapseudopsididae Gutu, 2006
    - Family Parapseudidae Gutu, 1981
    - Family Protoapseudoidae Heard et al. 2020
    - Family Sphaeromapseudidae Larsen, 2012
    - Family Sphyrapodidae Gutu, 1980
    - Family Tanzanapseudidae Bacescu, 1975
    - Family Whiteleggiidae Gutu, 1972
    - Genus Palaeotanais † Reiff, 1936
  - Superfamily Cretitanaoidea † Schram, Sieg, Malzahn, 1983
    - Family Cretitanaidae † Schram, Sieg & Malzahn, 1986
- Suborder Tanaidomorpha
  - Superfamily Neotanaoidea Sieg, 1980
    - Family Neotanaidae Lang, 1956
  - Superfamily Paratanaoidea Lang, 1949
    - Family Agathotanaidae Lang, 1971
    - Family Akanthophoreidae Sieg, 1986
    - Family Alavatanaidae † Vonk & Schram, 2007
    - Family Anarthruridae Lang, 1971
    - Family Colletteidae Larsen & Wilson, 2002
    - Family Cryptocopidae Sieg, 1977
    - Family Heterotanoididae Bird, 2012
    - Family Leptocheliidae Lang, 1973
    - Family Leptognathiidae Sieg, 1976
    - Family Mirandotanaidae Blazewicz-Paszkowycz & Bamber, 2009
    - Family Nototanaidae Sieg, 1976
    - Family Paratanaidae Lang, 1949
    - Family Pseudotanaidae Sieg, 1976
    - Family Pseudozeuxidae Sieg, 1982
    - Family Tanaellidae Larsen & Wilson, 2002
    - Family Tanaissuidae Bird & Larsen, 2009
    - Family Tanaopsidae Błażewicz-Paszkowycz & Bamber, 2012
    - Family Teleotanaidae Bamber, 2008
    - Family Typhlotanaidae Sieg, 1984
  - Superfamily Tanaidoidea Nobili, 1906
    - Family Tanaididae Nobili, 1906
