= 2015 in arthropod paleontology =

This list of fossil arthropods described in 2015 is a list of new taxa of trilobites, fossil insects, crustaceans, arachnids and other fossil arthropods of every kind that have been described during the year 2015. The list only includes taxa at the level of genus or species.

== Newly named arachnids ==
Name	Novelty	Status	Authorship of new name	Age	Unit	Location	Notes	Images
Archaelagonops propinquus	Sp. nov	Valid	Wunderlich	Cenomanian	Burmese amber	Myanmar	A member of Araneomorphae belonging to the family Lagonomegopidae, a species of Archaelagonops.	
Archaelagonops scorsum	Sp. nov	Valid	Wunderlich	Cenomanian	Burmese amber	Myanmar	A member of Araneomorphae belonging to the family Lagonomegopidae, a species of Archaelagonops.	
Archaeoscorpiops	Gen. et sp. nov	Valid	Lourenço	Cretaceous	Burmese amber	Myanmar	A scorpion belonging to the superfamily Chactoidea and the family Palaeoeuscorpiidae. The type species is Archaeoscorpiops cretacicus.	
Autotomiana	Gen. et sp. nov	Valid	Wunderlich	Cenomanian	Burmese amber	Myanmar	A member of Araneomorphae belonging to the family Praeterleptonetidae or Pholcochyroceridae. The type species is Autotomiana hirsutipes.	
Betaburmesebuthus	Gen. et 3 sp. nov	Valid	Lourenço & Beigel	Cenomanian	Burmese amber	Myanmar	A scorpion belonging to the superfamily Buthoidea and the family Palaeoburmesebuthidae. The type species is Betaburmesebuthus kobberti Lourenço & Beigel (2015); genus also includes B. bidentatus Lourenço (2015) and B. muelleri Lourenço (2015).	
Biapophyses	Gen. et sp. nov	Valid	Wunderlich	Cenomanian	Burmese amber	Myanmar	A member of Araneomorphae belonging to the family Praeterleptonetidae. The type species is Biapophyses beate.	
Bicalamistrum	Gen. et sp. nov	Valid	Wunderlich	Cenomanian	Burmese amber	Myanmar	A member of Uloboridae. The type species is Bicalamistrum mixtum.	
Bicornoculus	Gen. et sp. nov	Valid	Wunderlich	Cenomanian	Burmese amber	Myanmar	A member of Tetrablemmidae. The type species is Bicornoculus levis.	
Burmadictyna clava	Sp. nov	Valid	Wunderlich	Cenomanian	Burmese amber	Myanmar	A member of the family Salticoididae (related to the net-casting spiders and the cribellate orb weavers), a species of Burmadictyna.	
Burmadictyna excavata	Sp. nov	Valid	Wunderlich	Cenomanian	Burmese amber	Myanmar	A member of the family Salticoididae (related to the net-casting spiders and the cribellate orb weavers), a species of Burmadictyna.	
Burmathelyphonia	Gen. et sp. nov	Valid	Wunderlich	Cenomanian	Burmese amber	Myanmar	A whip scorpion of uncr. The type species is Burmathelyphonia prima.	
Burmesiola daviesi	Sp. nov	Valid	Wunderlich	Cenomanian	Burmese amber	Myanmar	A tree trunk spider, a species of Burmesiola.	
Burmorsolus	Gen. et 2 sp. nov	Valid	Wunderlich	Cenomanian	Burmese amber	Myanmar	Probably a relative of trogloraptorids. The type species is Burmorsolus nonplumosus; genus also includes Burmorsolus crassus (this species was subsequently transferred to the genus Pseudorsolus, but later it was transferred back to the genus Burmorsolus).	
Burmuloborus antefixus	Sp. nov	Valid	Wunderlich	Cenomanian	Burmese amber	Myanmar	A member of Uloboridae, a species of Burmuloborus.	
?Burmuloborus prolongatus	Sp. nov	Valid	Wunderlich	Cenomanian	Burmese amber	Myanmar	A member of Uloboridae, possibly a species of Burmuloborus.	
Chaerilobuthus birmanicus	Sp. nov	Valid	Lourenço	Cenomanian	Burmese amber	Myanmar	A chaerilobuthid scorpion.	
Chaerilobuthus bruckschi	Sp. nov	Valid	Lourenço	Cenomanian	Burmese amber	Myanmar	A chaerilobuthid scorpion.	
Chaerilobuthus enigmaticus	Sp. nov	Valid	Lourenço	Cenomanian	Burmese amber	Myanmar	A chaerilobuthid scorpion.	
Chaerilobuthus schwarzi	Sp. nov	Valid	Lourenço in Lourenço & Velten	Cenomanian	Burmese amber	Myanmar	A chaerilobuthid scorpion.	
Crassitibia	Gen. et 2 sp. nov	Valid	Wunderlich	Cenomanian	Burmese amber	Myanmar	A member of Araneomorphae; originally assigned to the family Praeterleptonetidae, subsequently transferred to the araneoid family Zarqaraneidae. The type species is Crassitibia longispina; genus also contains Crassitibia tenuimana.	
Cretaceothele	Gen. et sp. nov	Valid	Wunderlich	Cenomanian	Burmese amber	Myanmar	A member of Mesothelae. Originally assigned to the family Liphistiidae, but subsequently transferred to the separate family Cretaceothelidae. The type species is Cretaceothele lata.	
Cretotheridion	Gen. et sp. nov	Valid	Wunderlich	Cenomanian	Burmese amber	Myanmar	A member of Theridiidae. The type species is Cretotheridion inopinatum.	
Curvitibia	Gen. et sp. nov	Valid	Wunderlich	Cenomanian	Burmese amber	Myanmar	A member of Araneomorphae; originally assigned to the family Praeterleptonetidae, subsequently transferred to the araneoid family Zarqaraneidae. The type species is Curvitibia curima.	
Cushingia	Gen. et sp. nov	Valid	Dunlop et al.	Cenomanian	Burmese amber	Myanmar	A camel spider of uncertain phylogenetic placement. The type species is Cushingia ellenbergeri.	
Cymbiolagonops	Gen. et sp. nov	Valid	Wunderlich	Cenomanian	Burmese amber	Myanmar	A member of Araneomorphae belonging to the family Lagonomegopidae. The type species is Cymbiolagonops cymbiocalcar.	
Denticulsegestria	Gen. et sp. nov	Junior synonym	Wunderlich	Cenomanian	Burmese amber	Myanmar	A tube-dwelling spider, a member of the stem group of Segestriidae or a stem dysderoid. The type species is Denticulsegestria rugosa. Wunderlich & Müller (2020) considered the genus Denticulsegestria to be a junior synonym of the genus Parvosegestria, though the authors maintained the species D. rugosa as a distinct species within the latter genus.	
Dissorhina nuda	Sp. nov	Valid	Miko	Pliocene		Slovenia	An oribatid mite belonging to the family Oppiidae, a species of Dissorhina.	
Dissorhina paleokrasica	Sp. nov	Valid	Miko	Pliocene		Slovenia	An oribatid mite belonging to the family Oppiidae, a species of Dissorhina.	
Edwa	Gen. et sp. nov	Valid	Raven, Jell & Knezour	Late Triassic (Norian)	Blackstone Formation	Australia	A masteriine diplurid mygalomorph spider. The type species is Edwa maryae.	
?Eogamasomorpha clara	Sp. nov	Valid	Wunderlich	Cenomanian	Burmese amber	Myanmar	A member of Tetrablemmidae, possibly a species of Eogamasomorpha.	
Eopsiloderces serenitas	Sp. nov	Valid	Wunderlich	Cenomanian	Burmese amber	Myanmar	A member of Araneomorphae belonging to the family Eopsilodercidae, a species of Eopsiloderces.	
Eramoscorpius	Gen. et sp. nov	Valid	Waddington, Rudkin & Dunlop	Silurian	Eramosa Formation	Canada	An aquatic scorpion. The type species is Eramoscorpius brucensis.	
Eunicolina glaesi	Sp. nov	Valid	Bertrand, Sidorchuk & Hoffeins	Eocene		Europe (Baltic Sea coast)	A mite belonging to the family Labidostommatidae found in Baltic amber, a species of Eunicolina.	
Fessonia grabenhorsti	Sp. nov	Valid	Bartel et al.	Eocene to Oligocene		Europe	A mite belonging to the family Smarididae found in Baltic amber (Europe, Baltic Sea coast) and Bitterfeld amber (Germany), a species of Fessonia.	
Fessonia groehni	Sp. nov	Valid	Bartel et al.	Eocene		Europe (Baltic Sea coast)	A mite belonging to the family Smarididae found in Baltic amber, a species of Fessonia.	
Fessonia wunderlichi	Sp. nov	Valid	Bartel et al.	Eocene to Oligocene		Europe	A mite belonging to the family Smarididae found in Baltic amber (Europe, Baltic Sea coast) and Bitterfeld amber (Germany), a species of Fessonia.	
Fossilcalcar	Gen. et sp. nov	Valid	Wunderlich	Cenomanian	Burmese amber	Myanmar	A member of Mygalomorphae. The type species is Fossilcalcar praeteritus.	
Groehnianus	Gen. et sp. nov	Valid	Wunderlich	Cenomanian	Burmese amber	Myanmar	A member of Araneomorphae; originally assigned to the family Praeterleptonetidae, subsequently transferred to the araneoid family Zarqaraneidae. The type species is Groehnianus burmensis.	
Hypotheridiosoma falcata	Sp. nov	Valid	Wunderlich	Cenomanian	Burmese amber	Myanmar	A member of Araneomorphae. Initially considered to be a member of the family Praeterleptonetidae and a species of Hypotheridiosoma; subsequently transferred to the araneoid family Zarqaraneidae and to the genus Spinicymbium.	
Jordansegestria	Gen. et sp. nov	Valid	Wunderlich	Cretaceous		Jordan	A tube-dwelling spider, a member of the stem group of Segestriidae or a stem dysderoid. The type species is Jordansegestria detruneo.	
Jordariadna	Gen. et comb. nov	Valid	Wunderlich	Cretaceous		Jordan	A tube-dwelling spider, a member of the stem group of Segestriidae or a stem dysderoid; a new genus for "Ariadna" amissiocoli Wunderlich (2008).	
Kronocharon engeli	Sp. nov	Valid	Wunderlich	Cenomanian	Burmese amber	Myanmar	A whip spider (originally assigned to Neoamblypygi, but excluded from this group by Garwood et al., 2017), a species of Kronocharon.	
Kronocharon longicalcaris	Sp. nov	Valid	Wunderlich	Cenomanian	Burmese amber	Myanmar	A whip spider (originally assigned to Neoamblypygi, but excluded from this group by Garwood et al., 2017), a species of Kronocharon.	
Lacinius bizleyi	Sp. nov	Valid	Mitov, Dunlop & Penney	Paleogene (Eocene-Oligocene?)		Germany; Russia (Kaliningrad Oblast)	A member of Opiliones found in Baltic amber and Bitterfeld amber, a species of Lacinius.	
Lacunauchenius longissipes	Sp. nov	Valid	Wunderlich	Cenomanian	Burmese amber	Myanmar	A member of Archaeidae. Originally described as a species of Lacunauchenius, but subsequently transferred to the genus Eomysmauchenius.	
Lacunauchenius pilosus	Sp. nov	Valid	Wunderlich	Cenomanian	Burmese amber	Myanmar	A member of Archaeidae. Originally described as a species of Lacunauchenius, but subsequently transferred to the genus Planarchaea.	
?Lagonomegops tuber	Sp. nov	Valid	Wunderlich	Cenomanian	Burmese amber	Myanmar	A member of Araneomorphae belonging to the family Lagonomegopidae, possibly a species of Lagonomegops.	
Leclercera ellenbergeri	Sp. nov	Valid	Wunderlich	Cenomanian	Burmese amber	Myanmar	A member of Psilodercidae. Originally described as a species of Leclercera, but subsequently transferred to the genus Priscaleclercera.	
Leclercera sexaculeata	Sp. nov	Valid	Wunderlich	Cenomanian	Burmese amber	Myanmar	A member of Psilodercidae. Originally described as a species of Leclercera, but subsequently transferred to the genus Priscaleclercera.	
Lineaburmops	Gen. et 2 sp. nov	Valid	Wunderlich	Cenomanian	Burmese amber	Myanmar	A member of Araneomorphae belonging to the family Lagonomegopidae. The type species is Lineaburmops beigeli; genus also contains Lineaburmops hirsutipes.	
Longissipalpus	Gen. et 3 sp. nov	Valid	Wunderlich	Cenomanian	Burmese amber	Myanmar	A relative of Mongolarachne. The type species is Longissipalpus minor; genus also contains Longissipalpus magnus and Longissipalpus maior.	
Microuloborus	Gen. et sp. nov	Valid	Wunderlich	Cenomanian	Burmese amber	Myanmar	A member of Uloboridae. The type species is Microuloborus birmanicus.	
Myansegestria	Gen. et 2 sp. nov	Valid	Wunderlich	Cenomanian	Burmese amber	Myanmar	A tube-dwelling spider, a member of the stem group of Segestriidae or a stem dysderoid. The type species is Myansegestria engin; genus also contains Myansegestria caederens.	
Nasutiacarus	Gen. et sp. nov	Valid	Sidorchuk & Lindquist in Sidorchuk, Perrichot & Lindquist	Late Cretaceous (middle Cenomanian to early Santonian)		France	A mite belonging to the group Heterostigmata. The type species is Nasutiacarus perplexus.	
Nephila burmanica	Comb nov.	valid	(Poinar)	Early Cretaceous	Burmese amber	Myanmar	A nephiline. a new combination for "Geratonephila" burmanica	Nephila burmanica
Palaeoburmesebuthus ohlhoffi	Sp. nov	Valid	Lourenço	Cenomanian	Burmese amber	Myanmar	A palaeoburmesebuthid scorpion.	
Paramiagrammopes longiclypeus	Sp. nov	Valid	Wunderlich	Cenomanian	Burmese amber	Myanmar	A member of Uloboridae, a species of Paramiagrammopes.	
Paramiagrammopes patellidens	Sp. nov	Valid	Wunderlich	Cenomanian	Burmese amber	Myanmar	A member of Uloboridae, a species of Paramiagrammopes.	
Parviburmops	Gen. et sp. nov	Valid	Wunderlich	Cenomanian	Burmese amber	Myanmar	A member of Araneomorphae belonging to the family Lagonomegopidae. The type species is Parviburmops brevipalpus.	
Parvispina	Gen. et comb. nov	Junior homonym	Wunderlich	Cenomanian	Burmese amber	Myanmar	A member of Araneomorphae; originally assigned to the family Praeterleptonetidae, subsequently transferred to the araneoid family Zarqaraneidae. A new genus for "Praeterleptoneta" tibialis Wunderlich (2011). The generic name is preoccupied by Parvispina Kornicker & Imbrie (1958); Wunderlich (2025) coined a replacement name Parvispinina.	
Parvosegestria	Gen. et 4 sp. nov	Valid	Wunderlich	Cenomanian	Burmese amber	Myanmar	A tube-dwelling spider, a member of the stem group of Segestriidae or a stem dysderoid. The type species is Parvosegestria obscura; genus also contains Parvosegestria longitibialis, Parvosegestria pintgu and Parvosegestria triplex.	
Paxillomegops	Gen. et 2 sp. nov	Valid	Wunderlich	Cenomanian	Burmese amber	Myanmar	A member of Araneomorphae belonging to the family Lagonomegopidae. The type species is Paxillomegops longipes; genus might also contain a second species ?Paxillomegops brevipes.	
Pedipalparaneus	Gen. et sp. nov	Valid	Wunderlich	Cenomanian	Burmese amber	Myanmar	A relative of Mongolarachne. The type species is Pedipalparaneus seldeni.	
Phyxioschemoides	Gen. et sp. nov	Valid	Wunderlich	Cenomanian	Burmese amber	Myanmar	A spider of uncertain affinities, originally described as a member of Dipluridae. The type species is Phyxioschemoides collembola.	
Picturmegops	Gen. et sp. nov	Valid	Wunderlich	Cenomanian	Burmese amber	Myanmar	A member of Araneomorphae belonging to the family Lagonomegopidae. The type species is Picturmegops signatus.	
Planarchaea	Gen. et sp. nov	Valid	Wunderlich	Cenomanian	Burmese amber	Myanmar	A member of Archaeidae. The type species is Planarchaea kopp.	
Praeterpaculla	Gen. et 5 sp. nov	Valid	Wunderlich	Cenomanian	Burmese amber	Myanmar	A member of Tetrablemmidae. The type species is Praeterpaculla tuberosa; genus also contains Praeterpaculla armatura, Praeterpaculla biacuta, Praeterpaculla dissolata and Praeterpaculla equester.	
Primoricinuleus	Gen. et sp. nov	Valid	Wunderlich	Cenomanian	Burmese amber	Myanmar	A member of Ricinulei. The type species is Primoricinuleus pugio.	
Propterpsiloderces	Gen. et sp. nov	Valid	Wunderlich	Cenomanian	Burmese amber	Myanmar	A spider belonging to the family Eopsilodercidae. The type species is Propterpsiloderces longisetae.	
Retrooecobius	Gen. et 2 sp. nov	Valid	Wunderlich	Cenomanian	Burmese amber	Myanmar	A member of Oecobiidae. The type species is Retrooecobius chomskyi; genus also contains Retrooecobius convexus.	
Seldischnoplura	Gen. et sp. nov	Valid	Raven, Jell & Knezour	Early Cretaceous	Crato Formation	Brazil	A spider of uncertain affinities, originally described as a euagrine diplurid mygalomorph spider. The type species is Seldischnoplura seldeni.	
Spatiator putescens	Sp. nov	Valid	Wunderlich	Cenomanian	Burmese amber	Myanmar	A member of Araneomorphae belonging to the family Spatiatoridae, a species of Spatiator.	
Spinasilia	Gen. et sp. nov	Valid	Wunderlich	Cenomanian	Burmese amber	Myanmar	A tree trunk spider. The type species is Spinasilia dissoluta.	
Spinicreber	Gen. et sp. nov	Valid	Wunderlich	Cenomanian	Burmese amber	Myanmar	A member of Araneomorphae belonging to the family Pholcochyroceridae. The type species is Spinicreber antiquus.	
Spinipalpitibia	Gen. et sp. nov	Valid	Wunderlich	Cenomanian	Burmese amber	Myanmar	Originally described as a member of Araneomorphae belonging to the family Praeterleptonetidae; subsequently transferred to the leptonetoid family Protoaraneoididae. The type species is Spinipalpitibia maior.	
Spinipalpus	Gen. et sp. nov	Valid	Wunderlich	Cenomanian	Burmese amber	Myanmar	A member of Araneomorphae belonging to the family Pholcochyroceridae. The type species is Spinipalpus vetus.	
Sucinlourencous	Gen. et sp. nov	Valid	Rossi	Cenomanian	Burmese amber	Myanmar	A scorpion belonging to the superfamily Buthoidea and the family Sucinlourencoidae. The type species is Sucinlourencous adrianae.	
Syphax secedens	Sp. nov	Valid	Wunderlich	Eocene		Europe	A crab spider found in Baltic amber, a species of Syphax.	
Tityus apozonalli	Sp. nov	Valid	Riquelme, Villegas & González in Riquelme et al.	Early-Middle Miocene	Mexican amber	Mexico	A Buthidae scorpion	Tityus apozonalli
Uniscutosoma	Gen. et sp. nov	Valid	Wunderlich	Cenomanian	Burmese amber	Myanmar	A member of Tetrablemmidae. The type species is Uniscutosoma aberrans.	
Vetiator	Gen. et sp. nov	Valid	Wunderlich	Cenomanian	Burmese amber	Myanmar	A member of Araneomorphae. Originally assigned to the family Spatiatoridae, but subsequently transferred to the separate family Vetiatoridae. The type species is Vetiator gracilipes.	
Zamilia aculeopectens	Sp. nov	Valid	Wunderlich	Cenomanian	Burmese amber	Myanmar	A member of Oecobiidae, a species of Zamilia.	
Zamilia quattuormammillae	Sp. nov	Valid	Wunderlich	Cenomanian	Burmese amber	Myanmar	A member of Oecobiidae, a species of Zamilia.	
Zhizhu	Gen. et 2 sp. nov	Valid	Selden, Ren & Shih	Middle Jurassic to Early Cretaceous	Jiulongshan Formation; Yixian Formation	China	A cribellate spider related to net-casting spiders and cribellate orb weavers. Genus contains two species: Zhizhu daohugouensis and Zhizhu jeholensis.	

== Newly named crustaceans ==
=== Malacostracans ===
Name	Novelty	Status	Authorship of new name	Age	Unit	Location	Notes	Images
Blaculla haugi	Sp. nov	Valid	Winkler	Late Jurassic (early Tithonian)	Eichstätt Formation	Germany	A caridean shrimp, possibly a member of the superfamily Alpheoidea; a species of Blaculla.	
Braggicarpilius	Gen. et sp. nov	Valid	Beschin, Busulini & Tessier	Eocene (Ypresian)		Italy	A crab belonging to the family Carpiliidae. The type species is B. marginatus.	
Caloxanthus britannicus	Sp. nov	Valid	Collins	Late Cretaceous (Cenomanian)		France; United Kingdom	A feldmanniid crab, a relative of etyiids; a species of Caloxanthus.	
Caloxanthus thompsonorum	Sp. nov	Valid	Klompmaker, Hyžný & Jakobsen	Late Cretaceous (Santonian)		Austria	A crab, a species of Caloxanthus.	
Caloxanthus vignyensis	Sp. nov	Valid	Klompmaker, Hyžný & Jakobsen	Paleocene (Danian)		France	A crab, a species of Caloxanthus.	
Capsulapagurus brocheti	Sp. nov	Valid	Fraaije, van Bakel & Jagt	Early Cretaceous (early Albian)		France	A hermit crab belonging to the family Paguridae, a species of Capsulapagurus.	
Cenomanocarcinus boedekeri	Sp. nov	Valid	Ossó, Jackson & Vega	Late Cretaceous (middle Cenomanian)	Woodbine Formation	United States	A palaeocorystoid crab, a species of Cenomanocarcinus.	
Cenomanocarcinus cookseyi	Sp. nov	Valid	Ossó, Jackson & Vega	Early Cretaceous (Albian)	Walnut Formation	United States	A palaeocorystoid crab, a species of Cenomanocarcinus.	
Chlorodiella elenae	Sp. nov	Valid	De Angeli & Alberti	Eocene (Lutetian)		Italy	A crab belonging to the family Xanthidae, a species of Chlorodiella.	
Corallicarpilius	Gen. et sp. nov	Valid	De Angeli & Ceccon	Early Eocene		Italy	A crab belonging to the family Carpiliidae. The type species is C. arcuatus.	
Corallomursia pauciornata	Sp. nov	Valid	Beschin, Busulini & Tessier	Eocene (Ypresian)		Italy	A crab belonging to the family Calappidae.	
Daira vestenanovensis	Sp. nov	Valid	Beschin, Busulini & Tessier	Eocene (Ypresian)		Italy	A crab belonging to the family Dairidae.	
Dardanus braggensis	Sp. nov	Valid	Beschin, Busulini & Tessier	Eocene (Ypresian)		Italy	A species of Dardanus.	
Diaulax rosablanca	Sp. nov	Valid	Gómez-Cruz, Bermúdez & Vega	Early Cretaceous (early Valanginian)	Rosablanca Formation	Colombia	A dromioid crab, a species of Diaulax. Announced in 2015; validated in 2023.	
Eodromites guenteri	Sp. nov	Disputed	Starzyk	Late Jurassic (late Kimmeridgian)		Germany	A crab belonging to the superfamily Homolodromioidea and the family Goniodromitidae; a species of Eodromites. Klompmaker et al. (2020) considered this species to be a junior synonym of Eodromites grandis (von Meyer, 1857).	
Eodromites hyznyi	Sp. nov	Valid	Starzyk	Late Jurassic (Oxfordian)		Poland	A crab belonging to the superfamily Homolodromioidea and the family Goniodromitidae; a species of Eodromites.	
Eodromites rotundus	Sp. nov	Valid	Starzyk	Late Jurassic (Oxfordian)		Poland	A crab belonging to the superfamily Homolodromioidea and the family Goniodromitidae; a species of Eodromites.	
Erymastacus lagardettei	Sp. nov	Valid	Hyžný et al.	Middle Jurassic (Aalenian)		France	A member of Erymidae, a species of Erymastacus.	
Gastrodorus bzowiensis	Sp. nov	Valid	Krzemińska et al.	Late Jurassic		Poland	A gastrodorid hermit crab, a species of Gastrodorus.	
Gigantosculda	Gen. et sp. nov	Valid	Haug, Wiethase & Haug	Late Jurassic (Tithonian)	Solnhofen limestone (Altmühltal Group, Eichstätt Subformation)	Germany	A mantis shrimp. The type species is Gigantosculda ehrlichfeckei.	
Glypturus panamacanalensis	Sp. nov	Valid	Klompmaker et al.	Pleistocene to Holocene	Bermont Formation; Jaimanitas Formation	Cuba; Panama; United States	A member of Callianassidae, a species of Glypturus.	
Glypturus sikesi	Sp. nov	Valid	Klompmaker et al.	Late Miocene	Choctawhatchee Formation	United States	A member of Callianassidae, a species of Glypturus.	
Graptocarcinus moosleitneri	Sp. nov	Valid	Hyžný & Kroh	Early Cretaceous (Barremian)		France	A dynomenid dromioid crab, a species of Graptocarcinus.	
Jabaloya polonica	Sp. nov	Valid	Feldmann, Schweitzer & Błażejowski	Late Jurassic (late Tithonian)		Poland	A member of Mecochiridae, a species of Jabaloya.	
Latuxanthides	Gen. et sp. nov	Valid	De Angeli & Ceccon	Early Eocene		Italy	A crab belonging to the family Palaeoxanthopsidae. The type species is L. dentatus.	
Lessinithalamita	Gen. et sp. nov	Valid	De Angeli & Ceccon	Early Eocene		Italy	A crab belonging to the family Portunidae. The type species is L. gioiae.	
Mesolambrus ypresianus	Sp. nov	Valid	Beschin, Busulini & Tessier	Eocene (Ypresian)		Italy	A crab belonging to the family Parthenopidae.	
Metadynomene veronensis	Sp. nov	Valid	Beschin, Busulini & Tessier	Eocene (Ypresian)		Italy	A crab belonging to the family Dynomenidae.	
Mithrax arawakum	Sp. nov	Valid	Klompmaker et al.	Early Miocene	Montpelier Formation	Jamaica	A spider crab, a species of Mithrax.	
Montemagrechirus	Gen. et sp. nov	Valid	De Angeli & Ceccon	Early Eocene		Italy	A crab. Originally described as a species of Cryptochiridae; Klompmaker, Portell & van der Meij (2016) transferred it to the separate family Montemagrechiridae. The type species is M. tethysianus.	
Munida branti	Sp. nov	Valid	Nyborg & Garassino	Miocene	Astoria Formation	United States	A member of Munididae, a species of Munida.	
Munida grossetana	Sp. nov	Valid	Garassino & Pasini	Pliocene		Italy	A member of Munididae, a species of Munida.	
Munida prolata	Sp. nov	Valid	Feldmann, Schweitzer & Boessenecker	Pliocene	Purisima Formation	United States	A member of Munididae, a species of Munida.	
Munida witteae	Sp. nov	Valid	Nyborg & Garassino	Oligocene	Makah Formation	United States	A member of Munididae, a species of Munida.	
Munidopsis canadensis	Sp. nov	Valid	Nyborg et al.	Eocene		Canada	A squat lobster, a species of Munidopsis.	
Myanmariscus	Gen. et sp. nov	Valid	Broly, Maillet & Ross	Cretaceous		Myanmar	A woodlouse. The type species is Myanmariscus deboiseae.	
Nemausa windsorae	Sp. nov	Valid	Klompmaker et al.	Early Miocene	Montpelier Formation	Jamaica	A spider crab, a species of Nemausa.	
Neoliomera minuta	Sp. nov	Valid	Beschin, Busulini & Tessier	Eocene (Ypresian)		Italy	A crab belonging to the family Xanthidae, a species of Neoliomera.	
Neptocarcinus dezanchei	Sp. nov	Valid	Beschin, Busulini & Tessier	Eocene (Ypresian)		Italy	A crab belonging to the family Portunidae.	
Paguristes liwinskii	Sp. nov	Valid	Fraaije et al.	Early Cretaceous (late Albian)		Poland	A diogenid hermit crab, a species of Paguristes.	
Paradistefania	Gen. et sp. nov	Valid	Beschin, Busulini & Tessier	Eocene (Ypresian)		Italy	A crab belonging to the superfamily Homolodromioidea and the family Goniodromitidae. The type species is P. piccolii.	
?Paranecrocarcinus schloegli	Sp. nov	Valid	Hyžný & Kroh	Early Cretaceous (Barremian)		France	A necrocarcinid crab, possibly a species of Paranecrocarcinus.	
Peedeehomola	Gen. et sp. nov	Valid	Garassino, Clements & Vega	Late Cretaceous (late Maastrichtian)	Peedee Formation	United States	A member of Homolidae. The type species is P. deanbogani.	
Pleovideolana	Gen. et sp. nov	Valid	Gašparič et al.	Middle Jurassic		France	A cirolanid isopod. The type species is Pleovideolana gijsberti.	
Portunus (Portunus) pankowskiorum	Sp. nov	Valid	Schweitzer & Feldmann	Middle-late Miocene	Monterey Formation	United States	A portunid crab, a species of Portunus.	
Prealpicarcinus	Gen. et sp. nov	Disputed	De Angeli & Ceccon	Early Eocene		Italy	A crab belonging to the family Pilumnidae. The type species is P. dallagoi. Beschin et al. (2018) considered P. dallagoi to be junior synonym of "Titanocarcinus" kochi Lőrenthey (1898), creating a new combination Prealpicarcinus kochi.	
Ptychocaris sheldoni	Sp. nov	Valid	Mazurek, Dec & Łukowiak	Early Devonian		Poland	An echinocaridid phyllocaridan, a species of Ptychocaris.	
Schramocaris	Gen. et sp. nov	Valid	Clark et al.	Early Carboniferous		United Kingdom	A eumalacostracan crustacean similar to Tealliocaris and Pseudogalathea. The type species is Schramocaris gilljonesorum.	
Sosiocaris	Gen. et sp. nov	Valid	Jones et al.	Permian	Lercara Formation	Italy	A member of Peracarida belonging to the group Pygocephalomorpha.	
Squilla erini	Sp. nov	Valid	Haug et al.	Late Oligocene to early Miocene	Nye Mudstone	United States	A mantis shrimp, a species of Squilla.	
Tanidromites alexandrae	Sp. nov	Valid	Starzyk	Late Jurassic (Oxfordian)		Poland	A tanidromitid crab, a relative of homolodromiids; a species of Tanidromites.	
Tanidromites raboeufi	Sp. nov	Valid	Robin et al.	Middle Jurassic (late Bathonian)		France	A tanidromitid crab, a relative of homolodromiids; a species of Tanidromites.	
Vestenanovia	Gen. et sp. nov	Disputed	Beschin, Busulini & Tessier	Eocene (Ypresian)		Italy	A crab belonging to the family Macropipidae. The type species is V. carinata. De Angeli, Garassino & Ceccon (2020) considered this species to be a junior synonym of Caprocancer altus Müller & Collins (1991).	
Vicetiulita	Gen. et sp. nov	Valid	De Angeli & Ceccon	Early Eocene		Italy	A crab belonging to the family Inachoididae. The type species is V. granulata.	

=== Ostracods ===
Name	Novelty	Status	Authorship of new name	Age	Unit	Location	Notes	Images
Abyssocythere scotti	Sp. nov	Valid	Yasuhara et al.	Late Cretaceous (late Campanian and Maastrichtian) to Miocene		Southwestern Atlantic Ocean	A member of Trachyleberididae, a species of Abyssocythere.	
Acratia? pervagata	Sp. nov	Valid	Forel in Forel et al.	Permian-Triassic boundary		Iran	An ostracod, possibly a species of Acratia.	
Agrenocythere ciampoi	Nom. nov	Valid	Kempf	Late Oligocene		Italy	A member of Podocopida belonging to the family Trachyleberididae; a replacement name for Agrenocythere bensoni Ciampo (1981).	
Aleisocythereis	Gen. et sp. nov	Valid	Ceolin & Whatley in Ceolin et al.	Late Cretaceous (Maastrichtian)	Neuquén Basin	Argentina	A member of the family Trachyleberididae. The type species is Aleisocythereis polikothonus.	
Ameghinocythere archaios	Sp. nov	Valid	Ceolin & Whatley in Ceolin et al.	Paleocene (Danian)	Neuquén Basin	Argentina	A member of the superfamily Cytheroidea and the family Pectocytheridae; a species of Ameghinocythere	
Apatoleberis	Gen. et comb. nov	Valid	Ceolin & Whatley in Ceolin et al.	Late Cretaceous (Maastrichtian)	Neuquén Basin	Argentina; South Africa?	A member of the family Trachyleberididae. A new genus for "Trachyleberis" noviprinceps Bertels (1975); genus also contains "Trachyleberis" princeps Bertels (1969) and possibly "Trachyleberis" schizospinosa Dingle (1981).	
Argilloecia abnormalis	Sp. nov	Valid	Ceolin & Whatley in Ceolin et al.	Cretaceous-Paleocene boundary (Maastrichtian and Danian)	Neuquén Basin	Argentina	A member of the superfamily Cypridoidea and the family Pontocyprididae, a species of Argilloecia	
Argilloecia concludus	Sp. nov	Valid	Ceolin & Whatley in Ceolin et al.	Late Cretaceous (Maastrichtian)	Neuquén Basin	Argentina	A member of the superfamily Cypridoidea and the family Pontocyprididae, a species of Argilloecia	
Argilloecia hydrodynamicus	Sp. nov	Valid	Ceolin & Whatley in Ceolin et al.	Paleocene (Danian)	Neuquén Basin	Argentina	A member of the superfamily Cypridoidea and the family Pontocyprididae, a species of Argilloecia	
Argilloecia labri	Sp. nov	Valid	Yasuhara & Okahashi	Late Quaternary		North Atlantic Ocean (Rockall Plateau)	A pontocypridid podocopid ostracod, a species of Argilloecia.	
Atlanticythere bensoni	Sp. nov	Valid	Yasuhara et al.	Late Cretaceous (Campanian– Maastrichtian) to early Eocene		Southwestern Atlantic Ocean	A member of Trachyleberididae, a species of Atlanticythere.	
Atlanticythere oculi	Sp. nov	Valid	Yasuhara et al.	Late Eocene		Southeastern Atlantic Ocean	A member of Trachyleberididae, a species of Atlanticythere.	
Aversovalva glochinos	Sp. nov	Valid	Ceolin & Whatley in Ceolin et al.	Cretaceous-Paleocene boundary (Maastrichtian and Danian)	Neuquén Basin	Argentina; Brazil	A member of the superfamily Cytheroidea and the family Cytheruridae; a species of Aversovalva	
Bairdia biforis	Sp. nov	Valid	Mette, Honigstein & Crasquin	Middle Triassic (middle Anisian)	Reifling Formation	Austria	A bairdiid podocopid ostracod, a species of Bairdia.	
Bairdia chaotianensis	Sp. nov	Valid	Zazzali in Zazzali et al.	Permian (middle Capitanian to early Wuchiapingian)	Maokou Formation; Wujiaping Formation	China	A bairdiid podocopid ostracod, a species of Bairdia.	
Bairdia schneebergiana	Sp. nov	Valid	Mette, Honigstein & Crasquin	Middle Triassic (middle Anisian)	Reifling Formation	Austria	A bairdiid podocopid ostracod, a species of Bairdia.	
Bairdiacypris aequisymmetrica	Sp. nov	Valid	Mette, Honigstein & Crasquin	Middle Triassic (middle Anisian)	Reifling Formation	Austria	A bairdiid podocopid ostracod, a species of Bairdiacypris.	
Basslerella superarella	Sp. nov	Valid	Crasquin in Forel et al.	Permian-Triassic boundary		Iran	An ostracod, a species of Basslerella.	
Bensonocosta	Gen. et sp. nov	Valid	Yasuhara et al.	Late Cretaceous (Santonian to Maastrichtian) to late Miocene		Southwestern Atlantic Ocean; Indian Ocean	A member of Trachyleberididae. The type species is Bensonocosta bensoni; genus also contains two additional, unnamed species.	
Bensonodutoitella	Gen. et sp. nov	Valid	Yasuhara et al.	Late Cretaceous (late Campanian) to late Miocene		Southwestern Atlantic Ocean	A member of Trachyleberididae. The type species is Bensonodutoitella bicornigeri from late Miocene; genus also contains second, unnamed species from Late Cretaceous.	
Bicornucythere concentrica	Sp. nov	Valid	Yamaguchi et al.	Eocene (Priabonian)	Yaw Formation	Myanmar	An ostracod belonging to the family Trachyleberididae, a species of Bicornucythere.	
Bythoceratina cheleutos	Sp. nov	Valid	Ceolin & Whatley in Ceolin et al.	Paleocene (Danian)	Neuquén Basin	Argentina	A member of the superfamily Cytheroidea and the family Bythocytheridae, a species of Bythoceratina	
Bythoceratina nuda	Sp. nov	Valid	Yasuhara & Okahashi	Late Quaternary		North Atlantic Ocean (Rockall Plateau)	A bythocytherid podocopid ostracod, a species of Bythoceratina.	
Caspiocypris amiterni	Sp. nov	Valid	Spadi & Gliozzi in Spadi et al.	Pliocene-Pleistocene (Piacenzian–Gelasian)	L'Aquila Basin	Italy	An ostracod, a species of Caspiocypris.	
Caspiocypris bosii	Sp. nov	Valid	Spadi & Gliozzi in Spadi et al.	Pliocene-Pleistocene (Piacenzian–Gelasian)	L'Aquila Basin	Italy	An ostracod, a species of Caspiocypris.	
Caspiocypris nicandroi	Sp. nov	Valid	Spadi & Gliozzi in Spadi et al.	Pliocene-Pleistocene (Piacenzian–Gelasian)	L'Aquila Basin	Italy	An ostracod, a species of Caspiocypris.	
Caspiocypris vestinae	Sp. nov	Valid	Spadi & Gliozzi in Spadi et al.	Pliocene-Pleistocene (Piacenzian–Gelasian)	L'Aquila Basin	Italy	An ostracod, a species of Caspiocypris.	
Castillocythereis	Gen. et 2 sp. nov	Valid	Ceolin & Whatley in Ceolin et al.	Cretaceous-Paleocene boundary (Maastrichtian and Danian)	Neuquén Basin	Argentina	The type species is Castillocythereis multicastrum; genus also contains Castillocythereis albertoriccardii.	
Cavellina nesenensis	Sp. nov	Valid	Crasquin in Forel et al.	Permian-Triassic boundary		Iran	An ostracod, a species of Cavellina.	
Croninocythereis tridentiferi	Sp. nov	Valid	Yasuhara et al.	Middle Eocene to early Miocene		Southern Atlantic Ocean; Northwestern Pacific Ocean	A member of Trachyleberididae, a species of Croninocythereis.	
Cryptophyllus pius	Sp. nov	Valid	Truuver & Meidla	Ordovician (Hirnantian)		Poland	A member of Beyrichiocopida belonging to the family Cryptophyllidae, a species of Cryptophyllus.	
Cypria bikeratia	Sp. nov	Valid	Spadi & Gliozzi in Spadi et al.	Pliocene-Pleistocene (Piacenzian–Gelasian)	L'Aquila Basin	Italy	An ostracod, a species of Cypria.	
Cythereis clibanarius	Sp. nov	Valid	Ceolin & Whatley in Ceolin et al.	Paleocene (Danian)	Neuquén Basin	Argentina	A member of the family Trachyleberididae, a species of Cythereis.	
Cythereis dinglei	Sp. nov	Valid	Yasuhara et al.	Miocene		Southwestern Atlantic Ocean	A member of Trachyleberididae, a species of Cythereis.	
Cythereis fungina	Sp. nov	Valid	Yasuhara et al.	Early Oligocene to late Miocene		Southwestern Pacific Ocean; Southern Ocean	A member of Trachyleberididae, a species of Cythereis.	
Cythereis guerneti	Sp. nov	Valid	Yasuhara et al.	Late Eocene and Oligocene		Southwestern Atlantic Ocean	A member of Trachyleberididae, a species of Cythereis.	
Cythereis johnnealei	Sp. nov	Valid	Yasuhara et al.	Early Oligocene		Southern Ocean	A member of Trachyleberididae, a species of Cythereis.	
Cythereis legitimoformis	Sp. nov	Valid	Yasuhara et al.	Quaternary		North Pacific Ocean	A member of Trachyleberididae, a species of Cythereis.	
Cythereis neoanteplana	Sp. nov	Valid	Yasuhara et al.	Miocene		Southeastern Atlantic Ocean	A member of Trachyleberididae, a species of Cythereis.	
Cythereis ovi	Sp. nov	Valid	Yasuhara et al.	Oligocene and early Miocene		Southwestern Atlantic Ocean	A member of Trachyleberididae, a species of Cythereis.	
Cythereis parajohnnealei	Sp. nov	Valid	Yasuhara et al.	Middle Eocene to early Oligocene		Southern Ocean	A member of Trachyleberididae, a species of Cythereis.	
Cythereis purii	Sp. nov	Valid	Yasuhara et al.	Early Miocene		Indian Ocean	A member of Trachyleberididae, a species of Cythereis.	
Cythereis richardbensoni	Sp. nov	Valid	Yasuhara et al.	Late Miocene and Pliocene		Southwestern Atlantic Ocean	A member of Trachyleberididae, a species of Cythereis.	
Cythereis stratios	Sp. nov	Valid	Ceolin & Whatley in Ceolin et al.	Cretaceous-Paleocene boundary (Maastrichtian and Danian)	Neuquén Basin	Argentina	A member of the family Trachyleberididae, a species of Cythereis.	
Cythereis swansoni	Sp. nov	Valid	Yasuhara et al.	Miocene		Southern Ocean	A member of Trachyleberididae, a species of Cythereis.	
Cythereis sylvesterbradleyi	Sp. nov	Valid	Yasuhara et al.	Late Eocene to Miocene		Indian Ocean	A member of Trachyleberididae, a species of Cythereis.	
Cythereis tomcronini	Sp. nov	Valid	Yasuhara et al.	Oligocene and Miocene		Southern Atlantic Ocean; Northwestern Pacific Ocean	A member of Trachyleberididae, a species of Cythereis.	
Cythereis trajectiones	Sp. nov	Valid	Ceolin & Whatley in Ceolin et al.	Cretaceous-Paleocene boundary (Maastrichtian and Danian)	Neuquén Basin	Argentina	A member of the family Trachyleberididae, a species of Cythereis.	
Cytherella carmela	Sp. nov	Valid	Sciuto	Early Pleistocene		Italy	A member of Cytherellidae, a species of Cytherella.	
Cytherella pelotensis	Sp. nov	Valid	Manica, Bergue & Coimbra	Early Miocene	Pelotas Basin	South Atlantic Ocean (Brazilian margin)	A member of Cytherellidae, a species of Cytherella	
Cytherella saraballentae	Sp. nov	Valid	Ceolin & Whatley in Ceolin et al.	Late Cretaceous to Cretaceous-Paleocene boundary (Maastrichtian and Danian)	Neuquén Basin	Argentina; Niger	A member of Cytherellidae, a species of Cytherella	
Cytherella semicatillus	Sp. nov	Valid	Ceolin & Whatley in Ceolin et al.	Cretaceous-Paleocene boundary (Maastrichtian and Danian)	Neuquén Basin	Argentina	A member of Cytherellidae, a species of Cytherella	
Cytheropteron bidentinos	Sp. nov	Valid	Ceolin & Whatley in Ceolin et al.	Paleocene (Danian)	Neuquén Basin	Argentina	A member of the superfamily Cytheroidea and the family Cytheruridae; a species of Cytheropteron	
Cytheropteron colesoabyssorum	Sp. nov	Valid	Yasuhara & Okahashi	Late Quaternary		North Atlantic Ocean (Rockall Plateau)	A cytherurid podocopid ostracod, a species of Cytheropteron.	
Cytheropteron colesopunctatum	Sp. nov	Valid	Yasuhara & Okahashi	Late Quaternary		North Atlantic Ocean (Rockall Plateau)	A cytherurid podocopid ostracod, a species of Cytheropteron.	
Cytheropteron hyperdictyon	Sp. nov	Valid	Ceolin & Whatley in Ceolin et al.	Paleocene (Danian)	Neuquén Basin	Argentina; Brazil	A member of the superfamily Cytheroidea and the family Cytheruridae; a species of Cytheropteron	
Cytheropteron paramediotumidum	Sp. nov	Valid	Yasuhara & Okahashi	Late Quaternary		North Atlantic Ocean (Rockall Plateau)	A cytherurid podocopid ostracod, a species of Cytheropteron.	
Cytheropteron translimitares	Sp. nov	Valid	Ceolin & Whatley in Ceolin et al.	Cretaceous-Paleocene boundary (Maastrichtian and Danian)	Neuquén Basin	Argentina	A member of the superfamily Cytheroidea and the family Cytheruridae; a species of Cytheropteron	
Dutoitella atlantiformis	Sp. nov	Valid	Yasuhara et al.	Late Cretaceous (Santonian)		Indian Ocean	A member of Trachyleberididae, a species of Dutoitella.	
Dutoitella ayressi	Sp. nov	Valid	Yasuhara et al.	Miocene		Southeastern Atlantic Ocean	A member of Trachyleberididae, a species of Dutoitella.	
Dutoitella colesi	Sp. nov	Valid	Yasuhara et al.	Late Cretaceous (late Campanian)		Southwestern Atlantic Ocean	A member of Trachyleberididae, a species of Dutoitella.	
Dutoitella mazziniae	Sp. nov	Valid	Yasuhara et al.	Late Miocene and early Pliocene		Southern Atlantic Ocean	A member of Trachyleberididae, a species of Dutoitella.	
Dutoitella paradinglei	Sp. nov	Valid	Yasuhara et al.	Middle Miocene		Southern Ocean	A member of Trachyleberididae, a species of Dutoitella.	
Dutoitella spinosa	Sp. nov	Valid	Yasuhara et al.	Late Cretaceous (late Campanian) to late Miocene		Southwestern Atlantic Ocean	A member of Trachyleberididae, a species of Dutoitella.	
Dutoitella symmetrica	Sp. nov	Valid	Yasuhara et al.	Late Eocene		Indian Ocean	A member of Trachyleberididae, a species of Dutoitella.	
Dutoitella whatleyi	Sp. nov	Valid	Yasuhara et al.	Late Cretaceous (late Campanian) to middle Paleocene		Southwestern Atlantic Ocean	A member of Trachyleberididae, a species of Dutoitella.	
Eucythere dinetos	Sp. nov	Valid	Ceolin & Whatley in Ceolin et al.	Cretaceous-Paleocene boundary (Maastrichtian and Danian)	Neuquén Basin	Argentina	A member of the superfamily Cytheroidea and the family Cytherideidae; a species of Eucythere	
Eucytherura stibaros	Sp. nov	Valid	Ceolin & Whatley in Ceolin et al.	Cretaceous-Paleocene boundary (Maastrichtian and Danian)	Neuquén Basin	Argentina; Brazil	A member of the superfamily Cytheroidea and the family Cytheruridae; a species of Eucytherura	
Heinia prostratopleuricos	Sp. nov	Valid	Ceolin & Whatley in Ceolin et al.	Paleocene (Danian)	Neuquén Basin	Argentina	A member of the superfamily Cytheroidea and the family Loxoconchidae; a species of Heinia	
Hemingwayella verrucosus	Sp. nov	Valid	Ceolin & Whatley in Ceolin et al.	Paleocene (Danian)	Neuquén Basin	Argentina	A member of the superfamily Cytheroidea and the family Cytheruridae; a species of Hemingwayella	
Henryhowella (Wichmannella) praealtus	Sp. nov	Valid	Ceolin & Whatley in Ceolin et al.	Paleocene (Danian)	Neuquén Basin	Argentina	A member of the family Trachyleberididae, a species of Henryhowella.	
Hysterocythereis	Gen. et 3 sp. et comb. nov	Valid	Ceolin & Whatley in Ceolin et al.	Cretaceous-Paleocene boundary (Maastrichtian and Danian)	Neuquén Basin	Argentina	A member of the family Trachyleberididae. The type species is Hysterocythereis paredros; genus also contains Hysterocythereis coinotes and Hysterocythereis diversotuberculatus, as well as "Anticythereis" inconnexa Bertels (1973) and "Anticythereis" attenuata Bertels (1975).	
Ilyocypris ilae	Sp. nov	Valid	Spadi & Gliozzi in Spadi et al.	Pliocene-Pleistocene (Piacenzian–Gelasian)	L'Aquila Basin	Italy	An ostracod, a species of Ilyocypris.	
Inversacytherella atlantica	Sp. nov	Valid	Manica, Bergue & Coimbra	Early Miocene	Pelotas Basin	South Atlantic Ocean (Brazilian margin)	A member of Cytherellidae, a species of Inversacytherella	
Keijia circulodictyon	Sp. nov	Valid	Ceolin & Whatley in Ceolin et al.	Paleocene (Danian)	Neuquén Basin	Argentina	A member of the superfamily Cytheroidea and the family Pectocytheridae; a species of Keijia	
Keijia kratistos	Sp. nov	Valid	Ceolin & Whatley in Ceolin et al.	Paleocene (Danian)	Neuquén Basin	Argentina	A member of the superfamily Cytheroidea and the family Pectocytheridae; a species of Keijia	
Klieana? coimbraensis	Sp. nov	Valid	Cabral & Colin in Duarte et al.	Early Jurassic (Sinemurian)	Coimbra Formation	Portugal		
"Klinglerella" roselinae	Sp. nov	Valid	Cabral & Colin in Duarte et al.	Early Jurassic (Sinemurian)	Coimbra Formation	Portugal		
Krithe crepidus	Sp. nov	Valid	Ceolin & Whatley in Ceolin et al.	Cretaceous-Paleocene boundary (Maastrichtian and Danian)	Neuquén Basin	Argentina; Brazil	A member of the superfamily Cytheroidea and the family Cytherideidae; a species of Krithe	
Kunluniacypris	Nom. nov	Valid	Kempf	Late Permian	Tarim Basin	China	A member of the family Cyprididae; a replacement name for Kunlunia Jiang & Lin (1995).	
Leguminocythereis? buzasi	Sp. nov	Valid	Yasuhara et al.	Late Eocene		Southeastern Atlantic Ocean	A member of Trachyleberididae, possibly a species of Leguminocythereis.	
Limnocythere katu	Sp. nov	Valid	Bergue, Maranhão & Fauth	Oligocene	Tremembé Formation	Brazil	A member of the superfamily Cytheroidea and the family Limnocytheridae, a species of Limnocythere.	
Limnocythere mandubi	Sp. nov	Valid	Bergue, Maranhão & Fauth	Oligocene	Tremembé Formation	Brazil	A member of the superfamily Cytheroidea and the family Limnocytheridae, a species of Limnocythere.	
Looneyellopsis multiornata	Sp. nov	Valid	Carignano & Cusminsky	Late Cretaceous		Argentina	A member of Limnocytheridae.	
Loxoconcha (s.l.) posterocosta	Sp. nov	Valid	Ceolin & Whatley in Ceolin et al.	Paleocene (Danian)	Neuquén Basin	Argentina	A member of the superfamily Cytheroidea and the family Loxoconchidae of uncertain phylogenetic placement; a species of Loxoconcha (sensu lato).	
Microcheilinella alborzella	Sp. nov	Valid	Forel in Forel et al.	Permian-Triassic boundary		Iran	An ostracod, a species of Microcheilinella.	
Microcheilinella istanbulensis	Sp. nov	Valid	Olempska & Nazik	Early Devonian	Pendik Formation	Turkey	An ostracod, a species of Microcheilinella.	
Microcheilinella pagodaensis	Sp. nov	Valid	Zazzali in Zazzali et al.	Permian (middle Capitanian to early Wuchiapingian)	Maokou Formation; Wujiaping Formation	China	A microcheilinellid podocopid ostracod, a species of Microcheilinella.	
Microcheilinella wujiapingensis	Sp. nov	Valid	Zazzali in Zazzali et al.	Permian (early Wuchiapingian)	Wujiaping Formation	China	A microcheilinellid podocopid ostracod, a species of Microcheilinella.	
Mimicocythereis	Gen. et comb. nov	Valid	Ceolin & Whatley in Ceolin et al.	Late Cretaceous (Maastrichtian)	Neuquén Basin	Argentina	A member of the family Trachyleberididae. A new genus for "Bradleya" attilai Bertels (1975); genus also contains "Bradleya" patagonica Bertels (1975).	
Mirabairdia plurispinosa	Sp. nov	Valid	Mette, Honigstein & Crasquin	Middle Triassic (middle Anisian)	Reifling Formation	Austria	A bairdiid podocopid ostracod, a species of Mirabairdia.	
Mirabairdia praepsychrosphaerica	Sp. nov	Valid	Mette, Honigstein & Crasquin	Middle Triassic (middle Anisian)	Reifling Formation	Austria	A bairdiid podocopid ostracod, a species of Mirabairdia.	
Munseyella costaevermiculatus	Sp. nov	Valid	Ceolin & Whatley in Ceolin et al.	Late Cretaceous (Maastrichtian)	Neuquén Basin	Argentina	A member of the superfamily Cytheroidea and the family Pectocytheridae; a species of Munseyella	
Oligocythereis sylvesterbradleyi	Sp. nov	Valid	Yasuhara et al.	Middle Eocene		Indian Ocean	A member of Trachyleberididae, a species of Oligocythereis.	
Omerliella	Gen. et sp. nov	Valid	Olempska & Nazik	Early Devonian	Pendik Formation	Turkey	An ostracod. The type species is Omerliella rectangulata.	
Orthrocosta	Gen. et 3 sp. nov	Valid	Ceolin & Whatley in Ceolin et al.	Cretaceous-Paleocene boundary (Maastrichtian and Danian)	Neuquén Basin	Argentina	A member of the family Trachyleberididae. The type species is Orthrocosta decores; genus also contains Orthrocosta atopos and Orthrocosta phantasia.	
Paracypris bertelsae	Sp. nov	Valid	Ceolin & Whatley in Ceolin et al.	Paleocene (Danian)	Neuquén Basin	Argentina	A cypridoid ostracod belonging to the family Paracyprididae, a species of Paracypris	
Paracypris imaguncula	Sp. nov	Valid	Ceolin & Whatley in Ceolin et al.	Cretaceous-Paleocene boundary (Maastrichtian to Danian)	Neuquén Basin	Argentina	A cypridoid ostracod belonging to the family Paracyprididae, a species of Paracypris	
Paralimnocythere aucamahuevoensis	Sp. nov	Valid	Carignano & Cusminsky	Late Cretaceous		Argentina	A member of Limnocytheridae.	
Paralimnocythere musacchioi	Sp. nov	Valid	Carignano & Cusminsky	Late Cretaceous		Argentina	A member of Limnocytheridae.	
Paramunseyella epaphroditus	Sp. nov	Valid	Ceolin & Whatley in Ceolin et al.	Late Cretaceous (Maastrichtian)	Neuquén Basin	Argentina	A member of the superfamily Cytheroidea and the family Pectocytheridae; a species of Paramunseyella	
Pellucistoma curupira	Sp. nov	Valid	Gross, Ramos & Piller	Miocene	Solimões Formation	Brazil	A member of the family Cytheromatidae, a species of Pellucistoma.	
Perissocytheridea tunisiatlasica	Sp. nov	Valid	Trabelsi et al.	Early Cretaceous (Aptian)	Kebar Formation	Tunisia	A species of Perissocytheridea.	
Petalocythereis	Gen. et comb. nov	Valid	Ceolin & Whatley in Ceolin et al.	Cretaceous-Paleocene boundary (Maastrichtian and Danian)	Neuquén Basin	Argentina	A member of the family Trachyleberididae. A new genus for "Anticythereis" schilleri Bertels (1973); genus also contains "Anticythereis" venusta Bertels (1975).	
Phacorhabdotus nudus	Sp. nov	Valid	Yasuhara et al.	Late Cretaceous (Campanian–Maastrichtian)		Southwestern Atlantic Ocean	A member of Trachyleberididae, a species of Phacorhabdotus.	
Phacorhabdotus slipperi	Sp. nov	Valid	Yasuhara et al.	Middle Paleocene		Southeastern Atlantic Ocean	A member of Trachyleberididae, a species of Phacorhabdotus.	
Phelocyprideis	Gen. et sp. nov	Valid	Ceolin & Whatley in Ceolin et al.	Paleocene (Danian)	Neuquén Basin	Argentina	A member of the superfamily Cytheroidea and the family Cytherideidae. The type species is Phelocyprideis acardomesido.	
Phraterfabanella boomeri	Sp. nov	Valid	Cabral & Colin in Duarte et al.	Early Jurassic (Sinemurian)	Coimbra Formation	Portugal		
Polycope lunaris	Sp. nov	Valid	Yasuhara & Okahashi	Late Quaternary		North Atlantic Ocean (Rockall Plateau)	A polycopid ostracod, a species of Polycope (sensu lato).	
Procytherura erichbrandi	Nom. nov	Valid	Kempf	Middle Jurassic (Bathonian)		Germany	A member of Podocopida belonging to the family Cytheruridae; a replacement name for Procytherura reticulata Brand (1990).	
Reticulocosta edrianae	Sp. nov	Valid	Antonietto et al.	Early Cretaceous (Albian)	Riachuelo Formation	Brazil	A member of Podocopida belonging to the family Cytherettidae, a species of Reticulocosta	
Roundyella goekchenae	Sp. nov	Valid	Olempska & Nazik	Early Devonian	Pendik Formation	Turkey	An ostracod, a species of Roundyella.	
Ryugucivis	Gen. et sp. nov	Valid	Yasuhara et al.	Cretaceous (late Albian to Maastrichtian) to late Miocene		Southwestern Atlantic Ocean; Northwestern Pacific Ocean	A member of Trachyleberididae. The type species is Ryugucivis jablonskii; genus also contains Ryugucivis acuminata and Ryugucivis obtusa.	
Shivaella elertensis	Sp. nov	Valid	Chitnarin	Permian	E-Lert Formation	Thailand	An ostracod, a species of Shivaella.	
Sthenarocythereis	Gen. et comb. et sp. nov	Valid	Ceolin & Whatley in Ceolin et al.	Late Cretaceous (Maastrichtian)	Neuquén Basin	Argentina	A member of the family Trachyleberididae. A new genus for "Anticythereis" arcana Bertels (1975); genus also contains the new species Sthenarocythereis erymnos.	
Tabukicypris	Gen. et sp. nov	Valid	Chiu et al.	Holocene		Japan	The type species is Tabukicypris decoris.	
Taracythere thalassoformis	Sp. nov	Valid	Yasuhara et al.	Oligocene		Northwestern Pacific Ocean	A member of Trachyleberididae, a species of Taracythere.	
Trachyleberis abkhaziana	Nom. nov	Valid	Kempf	Late Pliocene		Abkhazia	A member of Podocopida belonging to the family Trachyleberididae; a replacement name for Trachyleberis quadrata Imnadze in Vekua (1975).	
Uralinova	Nom. nov	Valid	Kempf	Devonian		Russia	A member of Kloedenellocopida belonging to the family Gotlandellidae; a replacement name for Uralina Rozhdestvenskaya (1962).	
Vanalabia	Nom. nov	Valid	Kempf	Late Silurian		Czech Republic	A member of Kloedenellocopida, possibly belonging to the family Kloedenellitinidae; a replacement name for Vania Kruta & Siveter (1998).	
Vecticypris punctata	Sp. nov	Valid	Carignano & Cusminsky	Late Cretaceous		Argentina	A member of Limnocytheridae.	
Wolburgiopsis ballentae	Sp. nov	Valid	Carignano & Cusminsky	Late Cretaceous		Argentina	A member of Limnocytheridae.	

=== Other crustaceans ===
Name	Novelty	Status	Authorship of new name	Age	Unit	Location	Notes	Images
Arcoscalpellum scaniensis	Sp. nov	Valid	Gale in Gale & Sørensen	Late Cretaceous (Campanian)		Sweden	A scalpellid goose barnacle, a species of Arcoscalpellum.	
Bosquetlepas	Gen. et comb. nov	Valid	Gale in Gale & Sørensen	Late Cretaceous		Belgium; France; Netherlands; Sweden; Ukraine	A goose barnacle. A new genus for "Mitella" darwiniana Bosquet (1854). Genus also contains "Pollicipes" valida Steenstrup (1839), "Pollicipes" gracilis Roemer (1841), "Pollicipes" zeidleri Reuss (1864), "Calantica" (Scillaelepas) subplena Collins (1983) and "Calantica" (Scillaelepas) contigua Collins (1983). Genus might also contain "Calantica" (Scillaelepas) brydonei Withers (1935) and "Calantica" (Scillaelepas) turonica Withers (1935).	
Capitulum sklenari	Sp. nov	Valid	Veselská et al.	Late Cretaceous (late Cenomanian–early Turonian)	Bohemian Cretaceous Basin	Czech Republic	A scalpelliform barnacle, a species of Capitulum.	
Cratostracus? tunisiaensis	Sp. nov	Valid	Boukhalfa et al.	Early Cretaceous (Barremian)	Sidi Aïch Formation	Tunisia	A clam shrimp, possibly a species of Cratostracus.	
Estheriellites zavattieriae	Sp. nov	Valid	Tassi, Zavattieri & Gallego	Middle Triassic	Cerro de Las Cabras Formation	Argentina	A clam shrimp, a species of Estheriellites.	
Euestheria menendezi	Sp. nov	Valid	Tassi, Zavattieri & Gallego	Middle Triassic	Cerro de Las Cabras Formation	Argentina	A clam shrimp, a species of Euestheria.	
Invavita	Gen. et sp. nov	Valid	Siveter et al.	Silurian (about 425 mya)	Herefordshire Lagerstätte	United Kingdom	A tongue worm, possibly a member of Cephalobaenida. The type species is Invavita piratica.	
Ivoelepas	Gen. et sp. et comb. nov	Valid	Gale in Gale & Sørensen	Late Cretaceous		France; Peru; Sweden	A goose barnacle. The type species is Ivoelepas nielseni. Genus also contains "Calantica" (Titanolepas) ambigua Babinot, Collins & Tronchetti (1979), "Zeugmatolepas" ischna Pilsbry & Olsson (1951), "Zeugmatolepas" broggii Pilsbry & Olsson (1951), "Zeugmatolepas" withersi Pilsbry & Olsson (1951) and "Zeugmatolepas" rectibasis Pilsbry & Olsson (1951).	
Levelepas	Gen. et sp. nov	Valid	Gale in Gale & Sørensen	Late Cretaceous (Campanian)		Sweden	A goose barnacle. The type species is Levelepas roeperi.	
Leweslepas	Gen. et 3 sp. et comb. nov	Valid	Gale	Late Cretaceous (early Cenomanian to early Turonian)		Germany; United Kingdom	A thoracican barnacle belonging to the family Stramentidae. The type species is Leweslepas hattini; genus also includes new species L. hauschkei and L. wrightorum, as well as "Pollicipes" acuminatus Darwin (1851) and "Scalpellum" obsoletum Geinitz (1875).	
Loriculina ifrimae	Sp. nov	Valid	Gale	Late Cretaceous (Coniacian)		Mexico	A thoracican barnacle belonging to the family Stramentidae, a species of Loriculina.	
Loriolepas	Gen. et comb. nov	Valid	Gale	Late Jurassic and Early Cretaceous (Valanginian)		France; Germany; United Kingdom	A thoracican barnacle related to members of the family Stramentidae. The type species is "Pollicipes" suprajurensis de Loriol in de Loriol & Pellat (1867); genus also includes "Archaeolepas" decora Harbort (1905) and "Pollicipes" planulatus Morris (1845).	
Metaloriculina	Gen. et 2 sp. nov	Valid	Gale	Late Cretaceous (Coniacian to Campanian)		Mexico; United Kingdom	A thoracican barnacle belonging to the family Stramentidae. The type species is Metaloriculina stramentioides; genus also includes Metaloriculina norvicensis.	
Myolepas	Gen. et comb. nov	Valid	Gale in Gale & Sørensen	Late Cretaceous (Campanian to Maastrichtian)		Sweden; United States	A goose barnacle. A new genus for "Calantica" (Scillaelepas) scanica Withers (1935); genus also contains Brachylepas solida Zullo (1987).	
Parastramentum	Gen. et 3 sp. et comb. nov	Valid	Gale	Late Cretaceous (Turonian to Campanian)		Canada; Germany; United Kingdom	A thoracican barnacle belonging to the family Stramentidae. The type species is Parastramentum peakei; genus also includes new species Parastramentum albertaensis and P. brydonei, as well as "Loricula" expansa Withers (1911).	
Pollicipes (?) striatum	Sp. nov	Valid	Gale in Gale & Sørensen	Late Cretaceous (Campanian)		Sweden	A pollicipedid goose barnacle, possibly a species of Pollicipes.	
Pollicipes vansyoci	Sp. nov	Valid	Gale in Gale & Sørensen	Late Cretaceous (Campanian)		Sweden	A pollicipedid goose barnacle, a species of Pollicipes.	
Porobalanus	Gen. et comb. nov	Valid	Buckeridge	Early Pliocene		Antarctica (Cockburn Island)	A barnacle; a new genus for "Notomegabalanus" hennigi Newman (1979).	
Stramentum alekseevi	Sp. nov	Valid	Gale	Late Cretaceous (late Turonian)		Kazakhstan	A thoracican barnacle belonging to the family Stramentidae, a species of Stramentum.	
Stramentum praecursor	Sp. nov	Valid	Gale	Late Cretaceous (Cenomanian)		France; United Kingdom	A thoracican barnacle belonging to the family Stramentidae, a species of Stramentum.	
Strudops	Gen. et sp. nov	Valid	Lagebro et al.	Late Devonian		Belgium	A notostracan. The type species is Strudops goldenbergi.	
Titanolepas spinifer	Sp. nov	Valid	Gale in Gale & Sørensen	Late Cretaceous (Campanian)		Sweden	A goose barnacle, a species of Titanolepas.	
Titobustillobalanus	Gen. et sp. nov	Valid	Carriol in Carriol & Álvarez-Fernández	Late Pleistocene		Spain	A balanid barnacle. The type species is Titobustillobalanus tubutubulus.	
Toarcolepas	Gen. et sp. et comb. nov	Valid	Gale & Schweigert	Early Jurassic		France; Germany; United Kingdom	An eolepadid barnacle. The type species is Toarcolepas mutans; genus also includes T. gaveyi (Withers, 1920) and T. lotharingica (Méchin, 1901).	
Wannerestheria kozuri	Sp. nov	Valid	Weems & Lucas	Late Triassic (Norian)	Bull Run Formation	United States	A clam shrimp.	

== Trilobites ==
Name	Novelty	Status	Authorship of new name	Age	Unit	Location	Notes	Images
Acanthophillipsia felicitae	Sp. nov	Valid	Fortey & Heward	Permian (Kungurian–Roadian)		Oman	A phillipsiid, a species of Acanthophillipsia.	
Acadoparadoxides deani	Sp. nov	Valid	Geyer & Vincent	Cambrian		Turkey	A paradoxidid, a species of Acadoparadoxides.	
Acadoparadoxides levisettii	Sp. nov	Disputed	Geyer & Vincent	Cambrian		Morocco	A paradoxidid, a species of Acadoparadoxides. Suggested to be a junior synonym of Acadoparadoxides mureroensis by Álvaro, Esteve & Zamora (2018), but this interpretation was rejected by Geyer et al. (2019).	
Acadoparadoxides ovatopyge	Sp. nov	Disputed	Geyer & Vincent	Cambrian		Morocco	A paradoxidid, a species of Acadoparadoxides. Suggested to be a junior synonym of Acadoparadoxides mureroensis by Álvaro, Esteve & Zamora (2018), but this interpretation was rejected by Geyer et al. (2019).	
Acadoparadoxides pampalius	Sp. nov	Disputed	Geyer & Vincent	Cambrian		Morocco	A paradoxidid, a species of Acadoparadoxides. Suggested to be a junior synonym of Acadoparadoxides mureroensis by Álvaro, Esteve & Zamora (2018), but this interpretation was rejected by Geyer et al. (2019).	
Akoldinioidia latus	Sp. nov	Valid	Park & Kihm	Cambrian (Furongian)	Hwajeol Formation	South Korea	A member of the family Shumardiidae, a species of Akoldinioidia.	
Alumenella	Gen. et comb. nov	Valid	Geyer & Corbacho	Cambrian		Sweden	A burlingiid; a new genus for "Schmalenseeia" jagoi Whittington (1994).	
Amphoton krusei	Sp. nov	Valid	Smith, Paterson & Brock	Cambrian (Templetonian)	Giles Creek Dolostone	Australia	A member of Dolichometopidae, a species of Amphoton.	
Asaphellus isabelae	Sp. nov	Valid	Meroi Arcerito, Waisfeld & Balseiro	Ordovician (Tremadocian)	Cardonal Formation; Santa Rosita Formation	Argentina	A member of Asaphidae belonging to the subfamily Isotelinae, a species of Asaphellus.	
Brachymetaspis	Gen. et sp. nov	Valid	Gandl et al.	Early Carboniferous		Spain	A member of the family Proetidae belonging to the subfamily Drevermanniinae. The type species is B. coniceps.	
Burlingia balangensis	Sp. nov	Valid	Yuan & Esteve	Early Cambrian		China	A species of Burlingia.	
Cambroproteus	Gen. et sp. nov	Valid	Geyer	Middle Cambrian	Jbel Wawrmast Formation	Morocco	A member of Ptychopariida and Ptychoparioidea of uncertain phylogenetic placement. The type species is Cambroproteus lemdadensis.	
Caznaia coreaensis	Sp. nov	Valid	Park & Kihm	Cambrian (Furongian)	Hwajeol Formation	South Korea	A member of the family Saukiidae, a species of Caznaia.	
Chlupacula (Avenconia)	Subgen et 2 sp. nov	Valid	Gandl et al.	Early Carboniferous		Spain	A member of the family Proetidae belonging to the subfamily Cyrtosymbolinae. The subgenus includes new species Chlupacula (Avenconia) avenconis and Chlupacula (Avenconia) canpuigensis.	
Chlupacula (Chlupacula) greilingi	Sp. nov	Valid	Gandl et al.	Early Carboniferous		Spain	A member of the family Proetidae belonging to the subfamily Cyrtosymbolinae.	
Colombianaspis	Gen. et sp. nov	Valid	Morzadec in Morzadec et al.	Devonian (late Emsian)	Floresta Formation	Colombia	A calmoniid. The type species is Colombianaspis carvalhoae.	
Dactylocephalus levificatus	Sp. nov	Valid	Ghobadi Pour & Popov in Kebria-ee Zadeh et al.	Ordovician (Tremadocian)	Mila Formation	Iran	A dikelokephalinid asaphid, a species of Dactylocephalus.	
Dalmanitina (Dalmanitina) dargazensis	Sp. nov	Valid	Fortey & Heward	Late Ordovician	Seyahou Formation	Iran	A species of Dalmanitina.	
Diademaproetus dianae	Sp. nov	Valid	Van Viersen	Devonian (Eifelian)		Belgium	A member of Proetidae belonging to the subfamily Cornuproetinae.	
Drevermannia (Paradrevermannia)	Subgen. et sp. nov	Valid	Gandl et al.	Early Carboniferous		Spain	A member of the family Proetidae belonging to the subfamily Drevermanniinae. The type species is Drevermannia (Paradrevermannia) fastigata.	
Drevermannia (Pseudodrevermannia) manevilai	Sp. nov	Valid	Gandl et al.	Early Carboniferous		Spain	A member of the family Proetidae belonging to the subfamily Drevermanniinae.	
Eoptychoparia tafilaltensis	Sp. nov	Valid	Geyer	Cambrian	Jbel Wawrmast Formation	Morocco	A member of Ptychopariidae, a species of Eoptychoparia.	
Goldius endelsi	Sp. nov	Valid	Van Viersen	Devonian (Eifelian)		Belgium	A member of Styginidae belonging to the subfamily Scutelluinae.	
Granularaspis bommeli	Sp. nov	Valid	Geyer	Middle Cambrian	Jbel Wawrmast Formation	Morocco	A member of Corynexochida, a species of Granularaspis.	
Gudralisium rossumi	Sp. nov	Valid	Van Viersen	Devonian (Eifelian-Givetian)	Hanonet Formation	Belgium	A member of Acastidae belonging to the subfamily Asteropyginae.	
Gunnia fava	Sp. nov	Valid	Smith, Brock & Paterson	Cambrian	Tempe Formation	Australia	A ptychopariid, a species of Gunnia.	
Heliopeltis	Gen. et 2 sp. nov	Valid	Feist & Chatterton	Early Devonian		Morocco	A kolihapeltine scutelluid. Genus contains two species: H. ihmadii and H. johnsoni.	
Hentigia ornata	Sp. nov	Valid	Fortey & Heward	Permian (Kungurian–Roadian)		Oman	A phillipsiid, a species of Hentigia.	
Iranaspidion elephas	Sp. nov	Valid	Fortey & Heward	Permian (Kungurian–Roadian)		Oman	A phillipsiid, a species of Iranaspidion.	
Kettneraspis? prescheri	Sp. nov	Valid	Van Viersen & Heising	Devonian (Pragian)	Ihandar Formation	Morocco	A member of Odontopleuridae, possibly a species of Kettneraspis.	
Koldinioidia choii	Sp. nov	Valid	Park & Kihm	Cambrian (Furongian)	Hwajeol Formation	South Korea	A member of the family Shumardiidae, a species of Koldinioidia.	
Kolihapeltis bassei	Sp. nov	Valid	Feist & Chatterton	Early Devonian		Morocco	A kolihapeltine scutelluid, a species of Kolihapeltis.	
Kolihapeltis tafilaltensis	Sp. nov	Valid	Feist & Chatterton	Early Devonian		Morocco	A kolihapeltine scutelluid, a species of Kolihapeltis.	
Liobole (Liobole ?) angustigena	Sp. nov	Valid	Gandl et al.	Early Carboniferous		Spain	A member of the family Proetidae belonging to the subfamily Mirabolinae.	
Liobole (Quadratibole)	Subgen et sp. nov	Valid	Gandl et al.	Early Carboniferous		Spain	A member of the family Proetidae belonging to the subfamily Mirabolinae. The subgenus includes new species Liobole (Quadratibole) quadraticeps.	
Lunagraulos	Gen. et comb. et sp. nov	Valid	Liñán, Vintaned & Gozalo	Cambrian (Ovetian)	La Herrería Formation; Tamames Sandstone	Spain	A new genus for "Agraulos" antiquus Sdzuy (1961); genus also includes new species Lunagraulos tamamensis.	
Menorcaspis ? arcanensis	Sp. nov	Valid	Gandl et al.	Early Carboniferous		Spain	A member of the family Proetidae belonging to the subfamily Drevermanniinae.	
Menorcaspis calamicensis brevicauda	Subsp. nov	Valid	Gandl et al.	Early Carboniferous		Spain	A member of the family Proetidae belonging to the subfamily Drevermanniinae.	
Menorcaspis papiolensis	Sp. nov	Valid	Gandl et al.	Early Carboniferous		Spain	A member of the family Proetidae belonging to the subfamily Drevermanniinae.	
Menorcaspis tiedti antecedens	Subsp. nov	Valid	Gandl et al.	Early Carboniferous		Spain	A member of the family Proetidae belonging to the subfamily Drevermanniinae.	
Menorcaspis weisflogi	Sp. nov	Valid	Gandl et al.	Early Carboniferous		Spain	A member of the family Proetidae belonging to the subfamily Drevermanniinae.	
Nepea ommacrada	Sp. nov	Valid	Smith, Paterson & Brock	Cambrian (Templetonian)	Giles Creek Dolostone	Australia	A member of Nepeidae, a species of Nepea.	
Niordilobites	Gen. et comb. nov	Valid	Geyer & Corbacho	Cambrian		Sweden	A burlingiid; a new genus for "Schmalenseeia" acutangula Westergård (1948).	
Ovatoryctocara sinensis	Sp. nov	Valid	Zhao et al.	Cambrian	Kaili Formation	China	An oryctocephalid trilobite, a species of Ovatoryctocara.	
Penarosa oepiki	Sp. nov	Valid	Smith, Paterson & Brock	Cambrian (Templetonian)	Giles Creek Dolostone	Australia	A member of Nepeidae, a species of Penarosa.	
Pengia	Gen. et comb. nov	Valid	Geyer & Corbacho	Cambrian		China	A burlingiid; a new genus for "Schmalenseeia" fusilis Peng, Babcock & Lin (2004).	
Phaetonellus lelubrei	Sp. nov	Valid	Van Viersen	Devonian (Eifelian)		Belgium	A member of Tropidocoryphidae belonging to the subfamily Eremiproetinae.	
Pudoproetus (Belgiproetus)	Subgen. et 2 sp. et comb. nov	Valid	Müller & Hahn	Carboniferous (Mississippian)		Afghanistan; Belgium; Iran; Russia; Turkey; Germany?	A member of Proetidae, a subgenus of Pudoproetus. The type species is Pudoproetus (Belgiproetus) lelubrei; the subgenus also includes new species P. (B). praedicatus, as well as P. (B.) albiorix (Hahn, Hahn & Brauckmann, 1980), P. (B.) cellesensis (Hahn, Hahn & Brauckmann, 1980), P. (B.) damghanensis (Hahn, Müller & Aghababalou, 2013), P. (B.) incertus (Hahn, Hahn & Brauckmann, 1980), P. (B.) teutates (Hahn, Hahn & Brauckmann, 1980), P. (B.) toutiorix (Hahn, Hahn & Brauckmann, 1980) and P. (B.) ussuilensis (Nalivkin, in Weber, 1937).	
Radnoria guyi	Sp. nov	Valid	Pereira et al.	Late Ordovician	Cabeço do Peão Formation	Portugal	A member of Brachymetopidae, a species of Radnoria.	
Rozovia	Nom. nov	Valid	Doweld	Late Cambrian		Russia	A replacement name for Nordia Rozova (1968) (preoccupied).	
Sagittapeltis belkai	Sp. nov	Valid	Feist & Chatterton	Early Devonian		Morocco	A kolihapeltine scutelluid, a species of Sagittapeltis.	
Schopfaspis shergoldi	Sp. nov	Valid	Smith, Paterson & Brock	Cambrian (Templetonian)	Giles Creek Dolostone	Australia	A member of Alokistocaridae, a species of Schopfaspis.	
Semiproetus (Brevibole) trigonifrons	Sp. nov	Valid	Gandl et al.	Early Carboniferous		Spain	A member of the family Proetidae belonging to the subfamily Cyrtosymbolinae.	
Simulopaladin	Gen. et sp. nov	Valid	Fortey & Heward	Permian (Kungurian–Roadian)		Oman	A phillipsiid. The type species is Simulopaladin tridentifer.	
Struvephacops	Nom. nov	Valid	Ghobadi Pour	Early Devonian	Heisdorf Formation	Germany	A member of Phacopida; a replacement name for Cultrops Struve (1995) (preoccupied).	
Triproetus bonbon	Sp. nov	Valid	Fortey & Heward	Permian (Kungurian–Roadian)		Oman	A member of Proetidae, a species of Triproetus.	
Weyeraspis (Canovesia)	Subgen et sp. nov	Valid	Gandl et al.	Early Carboniferous		Spain	A member of the family Proetidae belonging to the subfamily Cyrtosymbolinae. The subgenus includes new species Weyeraspis (Canovesia) canovesensis.	

== Other arthropods ==
Name	Novelty	Status	Authorship of new name	Age	Unit	Location	Notes	Images
Ankitokazocaris bandoi	Sp. nov	Valid	Ehiro & Kato in Ehiro et al.	Early Triassic (Olenekian)	Osawa Formation	Japan	A member of Thylacocephala (a group of arthropods of uncertain phylogenetic placement, possibly crustaceans), a species of Ankitokazocaris.	
Dytikosicula	Gen. et sp. nov	Valid	Conway Morris et al.	Cambrian	Marjum Formation	United States	A putative megacheiran. The type species is Dytikosicula desmatae.	
Etainia	Gen. et sp. nov	Valid	Legg & Hearing	Middle Ordovician	Llanfallteg Formation	United Kingdom	An arthropod of xenopod affinities. The type species is Etainia howellsorum.	
Flumenoglacies	Gen. et sp. nov	Valid	Peel & Steng	Cambrian	Ekspedition Brae Formation; Stephen Formation	Canada; Greenland	A member of Bradoriida. The type species is Flumenoglacies groenlandica.	
Houia	Gen. et comb. nov	Valid	Selden, Lamsdell & Qi	Devonian (Lochkovian)	Xiaxishancun Formation	China	A chelicerate belonging to the lineage that branched from the main euchelicerate lineage prior to the divergence of Eurypterida, Arachnida and Chasmataspidida; a new genus for "Kasibelinurus" yueya Lamsdell, Xue & Selden (2013).	
Isoxys mackenziensis	Sp. nov	Valid	Kimmig & Pratt	Cambrian (Drumian)	Rockslide Formation	Canada	An arthropod of uncertain phylogenetic placement, a species of Isoxys.	
Kitakamicaris	Gen. et sp. nov	Disputed	Ehiro & Kato in Ehiro et al.	Early Triassic (Olenekian)	Osawa Formation	Japan	A member of Thylacocephala (a group of arthropods of uncertain phylogenetic placement, possibly crustaceans). The type species is Kitakamicaris utatsuensis. Laville et al. (2021) transferred K. utatsuensis to the genus Ankitokazocaris, while Ehiro and Kano (2024) denied that.	
Notchia	Gen. et sp. nov	Valid	Lerosey-Aubril	Cambrian (late Guzhangian)	Weeks Formation	United States	An arthropod of uncertain phylogenetic placement. The type species is Notchia weugi.	
Pentecopterus	Gen. et sp. nov	Valid	Lamsdell et al.	Ordovician (Darriwilian)	Winneshiek Shale Formation	United States	A megalograptid eurypterid. The type species is Pentecopterus decorahensis.	
Surusicaris	Gen. et sp. nov	Valid	Aria & Caron	Cambrian	Stephen Formation	Canada	A relative of Isoxys. The type species is Surusicaris elegans.	
Tanglangia rangatanga	Sp. nov	Valid	Paterson, Edgecombe & Jago	Cambrian	Emu Bay Shale	Australia	A member of (possibly paraphyletic) group Megacheira, a species of Tanglangia.	
Wiedopterus	Gen. et sp. nov	Valid	Poschmann	Early Devonian		Germany	A eurypterid. The type species is Wiedopterus noctua.	
Winneshiekia	Gen. et sp. nov	Valid	Lamsdell et al.	Ordovician (Darriwilian)	Winneshiek Lagerstätte	United States	A chelicerate sister to the clade comprising chasmataspidids, eurypterids, arachnids and Houia. The type species is Winneshiekia youngae.	
Yawunik	Gen. et sp. nov	Valid	Aria, Caron & Gaines	Middle Cambrian	Burgess Shale	Canada	A relative of Leanchoilia. The type species is Yawunik kootenayi.	
Yohoia utahana	Sp. nov	Valid	Conway Morris et al.	Cambrian		United States		
