= Newnhamia fuscata =

Conservation status
- Vulnerable (IUCN 2.3)

Scientific classification
- Domain: Eukaryota
- Kingdom: Animalia
- Phylum: Arthropoda
- Class: Ostracoda
- Order: Podocopida
- Family: Notodromadidae
- Genus: Newnhamia
- Species: N. fuscata

Binomial name
- Newnhamia fuscata (Brady, 1886)

Species of crustacean

Newnhamia fuscata is a species of ostracod in the family Notodromadidae. It is endemic to Australia.
