= Notodromas =

Scientific classification
- Kingdom: Animalia
- Phylum: Arthropoda
- Clade: Pancrustacea
- Class: Ostracoda
- Order: Podocopida
- Family: Notodromadidae
- Genus: Notodromas; Lilljeborg, 1853

Genus of crustaceans

Notodromas is a genus of ostracods belonging to the family Notodromadidae.

The species of this genus are found in Europe and Northern America.

Species:

- Notodromas monacha (Müller, 1776)
- Notodromas persica Gurney, 1921
