= Psammocytheridae =

Scientific classification
- Domain: Eukaryota
- Kingdom: Animalia
- Phylum: Arthropoda
- Class: Ostracoda
- Order: Podocopida
- Family: Psammocytheridae

Family of crustaceans

Psammocytheridae is a family of crustaceans belonging to the order Podocopida.

Genera:

- Bonaducecythere McKenzie, 1977
- Psammocythere Klie, 1936
