= Newnhamia =

Scientific classification
- Kingdom: Animalia
- Phylum: Arthropoda
- Class: Ostracoda
- Order: Podocopida
- Family: Notodromadidae
- Subfamily: Notodromadinae
- Genus: Newnhamia; King, 1855

Type species
- Newnhamia fenestrata King, 1855

Genus of seed shrimps

Newnhamia is a genus of ostracods. It contains five species, four of which are endemic to Australia and surrounding islands (including New Zealand and New Caledonia), while a fifth was described in 2003 from Kerala, India. Two species from South America, described as species of Newnhamia, do not appear to be closely related to the remaining species, and probably belong in a different genus. N. fuscata and N. insolita are both listed as vulnerable species on the IUCN Red List.

- Newnhamia dumonti George & Martens, 2003
- Newnhamia fenestrata King, 1855
- Newnhamia fuscata (Brady, 1886)
- Newnhamia insolita De Deckker, 1979
- Newnhamia petiola De Deckker, 1979
