= Eucytheridae =

Scientific classification
- Kingdom: Animalia
- Phylum: Arthropoda
- Clade: Pancrustacea
- Class: Ostracoda
- Order: Podocopida
- Family: Eucytheridae

Family of crustaceans

Eucytheridae is a family of crustaceans belonging to the order Podocopida.

== Genera ==
Genera:

- Aaleniella Plumhoff, 1963
- Aphelocythere Triebel & Klingler, 1959
- Cytheropsis M'Coy, 1849
