= Cyprois =

Scientific classification
- Domain: Eukaryota
- Kingdom: Animalia
- Phylum: Arthropoda
- Class: Ostracoda
- Order: Podocopida
- Family: Notodromadidae
- Subfamily: Cyproidinae; Hartmann, 1963
- Genus: Cyprois; Zenker, 1854

Species
- Cyprois marginata (Straus, 1821); Cyprois occidentalis Sars, 1926

Genus of crustaceans

Cyprois is a genus of crustaceans belonging to the family Notodromadidae. They are the sole member of the monotypic subfamily Cyproidinae. The two species of this genus are found in Europe and Northern America.
