= Fessonia brevicristata =

Scientific classification
- Domain: Eukaryota
- Kingdom: Animalia
- Phylum: Arthropoda
- Subphylum: Chelicerata
- Class: Arachnida
- Order: Trombidiformes
- Family: Smarididae
- Genus: Fessonia
- Species: F. brevicristata

Binomial name
- Fessonia brevicristata Meyer & Ryke, 1959

Species of mite

Fessonia brevicristata is a species of mite belonging to the family Smaridiidae. This is a densely hairy mite, shaped as a long oval, pointed in front. It reaches around 1 mm in length. There are two pairs of eyes, those placed further forward much larger than those behind. Both the first and fourth pairs of legs are longer than the body. It can be distinguished from its congeners by the structure of the crista (a sclerotized sensory area located at the highest point of the body). In this species, the crista is truncated so that the sensory setae lying furthest back along the body do not lie on the crista.

This species is endemic to South Africa and has since been transferred to the genus Kraussiana Southcott, 1961.
