= Kliellidae =

Scientific classification
- Domain: Eukaryota
- Kingdom: Animalia
- Phylum: Arthropoda
- Class: Ostracoda
- Order: Podocopida
- Family: Kliellidae; Schäfer, 1945

Family of crustaceans

Kliellidae is a family of crustaceans belonging to the order Podocopida.

Genera:

- Kliella Schaefer, 1945
- Nannokliella Schaefer, 1945
