= Neotroglocarcinus =

Scientific classification
- Domain: Eukaryota
- Kingdom: Animalia
- Phylum: Arthropoda
- Class: Malacostraca
- Order: Decapoda
- Suborder: Pleocyemata
- Infraorder: Brachyura
- Family: Cryptochiridae
- Genus: Neotroglocarcinus; Takeda & Tamura, 1980

Genus of crustaceans

Neotroglocarcinus is a genus of crabs belonging to the family Cryptochiridae.

Species:

- Neotroglocarcinus balssi (Monod, 1956)
- Neotroglocarcinus dawydoffi (Fize & Serène, 1956)
- Neotroglocarcinus hongkongensis (Shen, 1936)
- Neotroglocarcinus monodi (Fize & Serène, 1956)
