= Cytheruridae =

Scientific classification
- Kingdom: Animalia
- Phylum: Arthropoda
- Clade: Pancrustacea
- Class: Ostracoda
- Order: Podocopida
- Family: Cytheruridae

Family of crustaceans

Cytheruridae is a family of ostracods belonging to the order Podocopida.

Extant Cytherudidae species live in the oceanic and euryhaline environments.

== Genera ==
Genera:

- Absonocytheropteron Puri, 1957
- Acrocythere Neale, 1960
- Afghanistinia Hu & Tao, 2008
