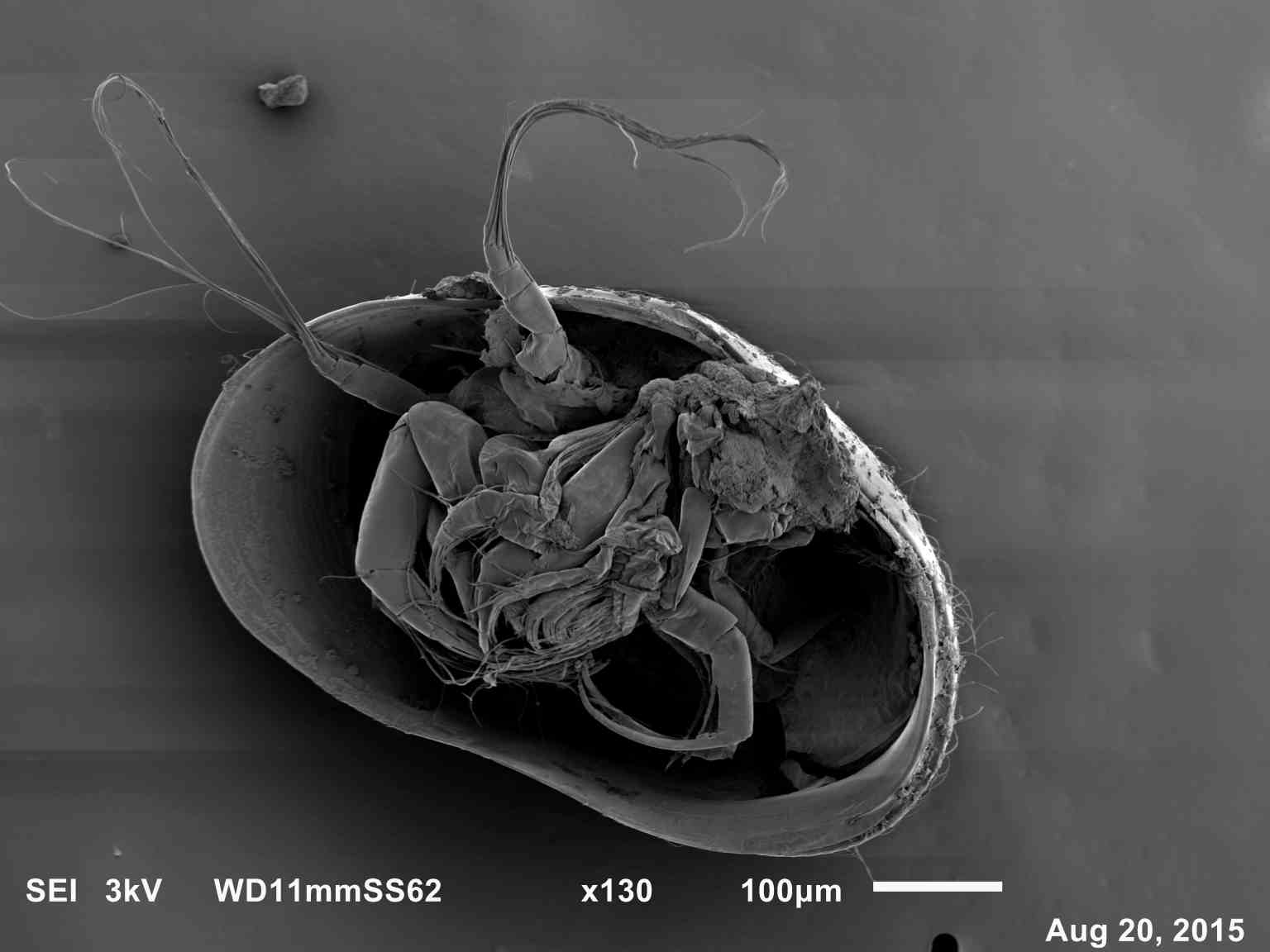
- Cypridopsis vidua

Scientific classification
- Domain: Eukaryota
- Kingdom: Animalia
- Phylum: Arthropoda
- Class: Ostracoda
- Order: Podocopida
- Suborder: Cypridocopina; Jones, 1901

Superfamilies
- Cypridoidea; Macrocypridoidea; Pontocypridoidea

= Cypridocopina =

Suborder of seed shrimps

Cypridocopina is a suborder of ostracods in the order Podocopida. It is divided into three superfamilies – Cypridoidea, Macrocypridoidea and Pontocypridoidea.
