= Cypridoidea =

Scientific classification
- Kingdom: Animalia
- Phylum: Arthropoda
- Class: Ostracoda
- Order: Podocopida
- Suborder: Cypridocopina
- Superfamily: Cypridoidea; Baird, 1845

Families
- See text

Synonyms
- Cypridacea Jones, 1901

Superfamily of seed shrimps

Cypridoidea is a superfamily of ostracods in the suborder Cypridocopina.

== Taxonomy ==
The following families are recognised in the superfamily Cypridoidea:

- Candonidae
- †Cyprideidae
- Cyprididae
- Ilyocyprididae
- Notodromadidae
- †Quadracyprididae
- †Trapezoidellidae

Unassigned taxa:

- Genus †Pythagoracypris
- Genus †Schneideria

== See also ==
- Bennelongia
