= Pectocytheridae =

Scientific classification
- Domain: Eukaryota
- Kingdom: Animalia
- Phylum: Arthropoda
- Class: Ostracoda
- Order: Podocopida
- Family: Pectocytheridae

Family of crustaceans

Pectocytheridae is a family of crustaceans belonging to the order Podocopida.

== Selected genera ==
- Ameghinocythere Whatley, Moguilevsky, Toy, Chadwick & Ramos, 1997
- Bidgeecythere McKenzie, Reyment & Reyment, 1993
- Ekpectocythere Choe, 1988
