= Oppiella nova =

Scientific classification
- Kingdom: Animalia
- Phylum: Arthropoda
- Subphylum: Chelicerata
- Class: Arachnida
- Order: Oribatida
- Family: Oppiidae
- Genus: Oppiella
- Species: O. nova

Binomial name
- Oppiella nova (Oudemans, 1902)

Species of mite

Oppiella nova is a species of soil mite in the family Oppiidae that can be found worldwide including Oahu, Hawaii and Okinawa, Japan. The species is 350 micrometres (0.014 in) long and 180 micrometres (0.0071 in) wide with short setae.

It is among the few animal species capable of surviving on asexual reproduction alone.
