= Trachyleberididae =

Scientific classification
- Kingdom: Animalia
- Phylum: Arthropoda
- Clade: Pancrustacea
- Class: Ostracoda
- Order: Podocopida
- Family: Trachyleberididae

Family of crustaceans

Trachyleberididae is a family of ostracods belonging to the order Podocopida.

== Genera ==
Genera:

- Abrocythereis Gou, 1983
- Abyssocythere Benson, 1971
- Abyssophilos Jellinek & Swanson, 2003
