= Pontocyprididae =

Scientific classification
- Kingdom: Animalia
- Phylum: Arthropoda
- Clade: Pancrustacea
- Class: Ostracoda
- Order: Podocopida
- Family: Pontocyprididae

Family of crustaceans

Pontocyprididae is a family of ostracods belonging to the order Podocopida. There are two kinds of appearances within the pontocyprididae. Abyssocypris and Argilloecia genera include strong antennas, short claw like swimming setae, and small caudal ramus. Other generas include slender antennas, long and thin swimming setae, and caudal ramus.

== Habitat ==
Pontocyprididae are ecology diverse as they live in deep oceans, interstitial waters (water that occurs naturally within the pores of a rock), and echinoderms.

== Genera ==
Genera:

- Abyssocypris Bold, 1974
- Aratrocypris Whatley, Ayress, Downing, Harlow & Kesler, 1985
- Argilloecia Sars, 1866
- Ekpontocypris
- Schedopontocypris
