= Loxoconchidae =

Scientific classification
- Kingdom: Animalia
- Phylum: Arthropoda
- Clade: Pancrustacea
- Class: Ostracoda
- Order: Podocopida
- Family: Loxoconchidae

Family of crustaceans

Loxoconchidae is a family of ostracods belonging to the order Podocopida.

== Genera ==
Genera:

- Alataconcha Whatley & Zhao
- Antarctiloxoconcha Hartmann, 1986
- Australoloxoconcha Hartmann, 1974
