= Cytheromatidae =

Scientific classification
- Kingdom: Animalia
- Phylum: Arthropoda
- Clade: Pancrustacea
- Class: Ostracoda
- Order: Podocopida
- Family: Cytheromatidae

Family of crustaceans

Cytheromatidae is a family of crustaceans belonging to the order Podocopida.

Genera:

- Afghanistina Hu & Tao, 2008
- Cytheroma Mueller, 1894
- Fernandinacythere Gottwald, 1983
- Luvula Coryell & Fields, 1937
- Megacythere Puri, 1960
- Microloxoconcha Hartmann, 1954
- Paracytheroma Juday, 1907
- Pellucistoma Coryell & Fields, 1937
- Pontocytheroma Marinov, 1963
