= Nepeidae =

Nepeidae Temporal range: Drumian to Guzhangian

Scientific classification
- Kingdom: Animalia
- Phylum: Arthropoda
- Clade: †Artiopoda
- Class: †Trilobita
- Order: †Ptychopariida
- Superfamily: †Ptychoparioidea
- Family: †Nepeidae; Whitehouse, 1939

Genera
- Ascionepea Oplk, 1967; Ferenepea Öpik, 1967; Folliceps Öpik, 1970; Loxonepea Öpik, 1970; Nepea Whitehouse, 1939; Penarosa Öpik, 1970

Nepeidae is a family of trilobites that lived from the end of the Middle Cambrian to the beginning of the Late Cambrian in what are today Australia, Antarctica, China and New Zealand. Members of the family can be recognized by a vaulted area between the front of the glabella and the frontal border, eye ridges that extend outward and slightly forward from the front of the glabella, and fixed cheeks that cut into the free cheeks at the inside of the eye, and that extend backwards, forming the inner base of the genal spines. The genal spines, however, are part of the free cheeks and extend backward at least half the length of the thorax. The thorax has at least 20 segments. The tail shield (or pygidium) is small.
