= Fessonia =

Fessonia Temporal range: Palaeogene–present

Scientific classification
- Domain: Eukaryota
- Kingdom: Animalia
- Phylum: Arthropoda
- Subphylum: Chelicerata
- Class: Arachnida
- Order: Trombidiformes
- Family: Smarididae
- Genus: Fessonia; Heyden, 1826

Species
- Several, including: Fessonia australiensis; Fessonia brevicristata; Fessonia papillosa

Genus of mites

Fessonia is a genus of mites belonging to the family Smaridiidae. These mites can be distinguished from other related genera by having 2 pairs of eyes and always lacking sclerotized plates on the body.
