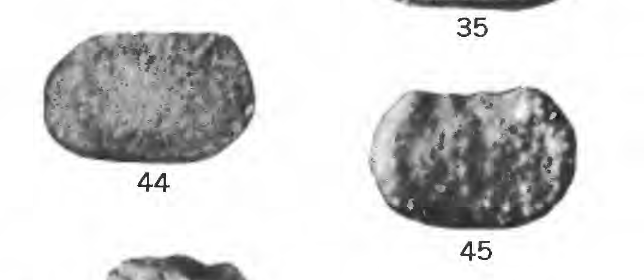
- Roundyella? simplex, R. nodomarginata

Scientific classification
- Kingdom: Animalia
- Phylum: Arthropoda
- Clade: Pancrustacea
- Class: Ostracoda
- Order: †Leperditellocopida
- Family: †Scrobiculidae
- Genus: †Roundyella

= Roundyella =

Roundyella Temporal range: Devonian-Triassic

Extinct genus of seed shrimp

Roundyella is an extinct genus of ostracod (seed shrimp) belonging to the order Leperditellocopida and family Scrobiculidae. Specimens have been found in beds of Devonian to Triassic age in Australia, Asia, Europe, North America, and South America.

== Species ==
- Roundyella bellatula Bradfield 1935
- Roundyella dorsopapillosa Sohn 1954
- Roundyella kroemmelbeini Kozur 1985
- Roundyella lebaensis Krommelbein 1958
- Roundyella ludbrookae Fleming 1985
- Roundyella neopapillosa Ishizaki 1964
- Roundyella ovatiformis Hou 1954
- Roundyella papilliformis Wang 1978
- Roundyella simplex Girty 1910
- Roundyella simplicissima Knight 1928
