= Penarosa =

Penarosa Temporal range: Cambrian

Scientific classification
- Kingdom: Animalia
- Phylum: Arthropoda
- Clade: †Artiopoda
- Class: †Trilobita
- Order: †Ptychopariida
- Family: †Nepeidae
- Genus: †Penarosa; Öpik, 1970

Penarosa is an extinct genus from a well-known class of fossil marine arthropods, the trilobites. It lived during the Middle Cambrian (Ptychagnostus atavus Zone to Ptychagnostus punctuosus Zone), approximately 505 to 500 million years ago.
