= Schmalenseeia =

Schmalenseeia Temporal range: middle Middle to earliest Upper Cambrian

Scientific classification
- Kingdom: Animalia
- Phylum: Arthropoda
- Clade: †Artiopoda
- Class: †Trilobita
- Order: †incertae sedis
- Family: †Burlingiidae
- Genus: †Schmalenseeia; Moberg, 1903

Species
- S. amphionura Moberg, 1903 (type); S. acutangula (Westergaard, 1948); S. arthrotryphe Ebbestad & Budd, 2003; S. gostiensis Jago, 1972; S. longa Ju, 1983; S. sinensis Yang, 1978; S. spinulosa Lazarenko, 1960; S. transversa Ju, 1983

Schmalenseeia is genus of trilobites of uncertain affinity, that lived during the middle Middle to earliest Upper Cambrian (Tomagnostus fissus/Ptychagnostus atavus- to Agnostus pisiformis-zone). Species assigned to Schmalenseeia have been found in Norway, Sweden, Northern Siberia, Eastern China, Australia (Tasmania), India (Himalayas) and the United Kingdom.

== Etymology ==
Schmalenseeia was named in honor of C.G. von Schmalensee, who collected the first specimen.

- The species epithet arthrotryphe is derived from the Ancient Greek 'athroos' meaning "crowded" and 'tryphos', "part", referring to the large number of segments.

== Taxonomy ==
The first species of Schmalenseeia to occur in the fossil record, S. acutangula, must have developed from an early species of Burlingia. It is intermediate between the two genera. The affinities of the family Burlingiidae to which Schmalenseeia has been assigned remain uncertain. Schmalenseeia shares many features with Kleptothule, such as a glabella tapering forward and a prominent preglabellar ridge, but a close relationship seems unlikely due to the apparent lack of facial sutures and the much earlier appearance in the fossil record of Kleptothule.

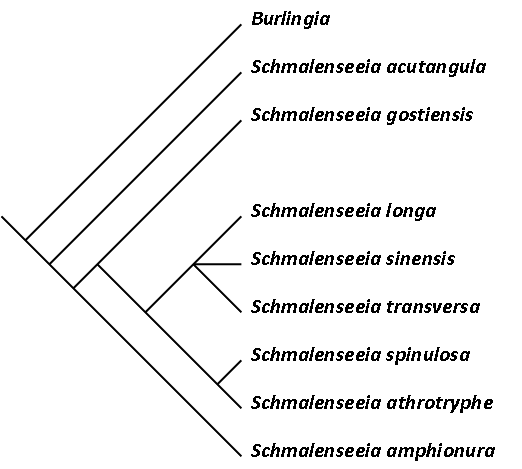
Cladogram of the species of Schmalenseeia

=== Species previously assigned to Schmalenseeia ===
- S. jagoi = Burlingia jagoi

== Description ==
Like all burlingiids, Schmalenseeia is small (less than 1 cm long), has an overall ovate shape, proparian facial sutures, and raised anterior borders of the pleura. Schmalenseeia has between 7 and 9 thorax segments, while Burlingia has between 10 and 15. In Burlingia it is however difficult to determine where the thorax meets the pygidium, particularly because uniquely, the pleurae of the pygidium are not fused. All Schmalenseeia-species with the exception of S. acutangula have a glabella that tapers forward, and is connected with the anterior border by a ridge (the so-called plectrum).

== Distribution ==
- S. acutangula is known from the Middle Cambrian of (''Tomagnostus fissus/Ptychagnostus atavus-zone, )
- S. amphionura has been found in the Upper Cambrian (lower Agnostus pisiformis-zone) of India (the Hymalayas), Sweden (Jämtland, Scania and Gotland), the United Kingdom (Nuneaton District).
- S. arthrotryphe occurs in the Upper Cambrian of (Agnostus pisiformis-zone, Alum shale Formation, near Bråstad on Lake Mjøsa, Ringsaker District, Norway).
- S. gostiensis is known from the Middle Cambrian of Australia (Lejopyge laevigata-zone, Tasmania).
- S. longa was excavated from the Middle Cambrian of Eastern China (Lejopyge laevigata-zone).
- S. sinensis is present in the Middle Cambrian of Eastern China (Lejopyge laevigata-zone, Paibi section, Huaqiao Formation, Hunan, 28.4° N, 109.5° E).
- S. spinulosa occurs in the Upper Cambrian of Northern Siberia (Agnostus pisiformis-zone).
- S. transversa is present in the Middle Cambrian of Eastern China (Lejopyge laevigata-zone).
