= Paramiagrammopes =

Paramiagrammopes Temporal range: 99.7–94.3 Ma

Scientific classification
- Domain: Eukaryota
- Kingdom: Animalia
- Phylum: Arthropoda
- Subphylum: Chelicerata
- Class: Arachnida
- Order: Araneae
- Infraorder: Araneomorphae
- Family: Uloboridae
- Subfamily: †Miagrammopinae
- Genus: †Paramiagrammopes; Wunderlich, 2008

Type species
- Paramiagrammopes cretaceus Wunderlich, 2008

Diversity
- 21 species

Synonyms
- Palaeouloborus Selden, 1990; Palaeomiagrammopes Wunderlich, 2008; Jerseyuloborus Wunderlich, 2011; Furculoborus Wunderlich, 2017

Extinct genus of spiders

Paramiagrammopes is an extinct genus of spiders in the family Uloboridae.

== Species ==
- Paramiagrammopes appendix Wunderlich, 2021
- Paramiagrammopes cretaceus Wunderlich, 2008
- Paramiagrammopes curvatus Wunderlich, 2021
- Paramiagrammopes furca Wunderlich, 2021
- Paramiagrammopes granulatus Wunderlich, 2021
- Paramiagrammopes inaequalis Wunderlich, 2021
- Paramiagrammopes inclinatus Wunderlich, 2021
- Paramiagrammopes longiclypeus Wunderlich, 2015
- Paramiagrammopes multifemurspinae Wunderlich, 2021
- Paramiagrammopes paracurvatus Wunderlich, 2021
- Paramiagrammopes patellaris (Wunderlich, 2017)
- Paramiagrammopes patellidens Wunderlich, 2015
- Paramiagrammopes pilosus Wunderlich, 2021
- Paramiagrammopes pollux Wunderlich, 2021
- Paramiagrammopes pusillus Wunderlich, 2018
- Paramiagrammopes semiapertus Wunderlich, 2021
- Paramiagrammopes simplex Wunderlich, 2021
- Paramiagrammopes sulcus Wunderlich, 2021
- Paramiagrammopes texter Wunderlich, 2021
- Paramiagrammopes unibrevispina Wunderlich, 2021
- Paramiagrammopes vesica (Wunderlich, 2008)
