= Burlingia =

Burlingia Temporal range: lower and middle Middle Cambrian

Scientific classification
- Domain: Eukaryota
- Kingdom: Animalia
- Phylum: Arthropoda
- Class: †Trilobita
- Order: †incertae sedis
- Family: †Burlingiidae
- Genus: †Burlingia; Walcott, 1908

Species
- B. hectori Walcott, 1908 (Type); B. angusta Ebbestad & Budd, 2003; B. jagoi (Wittington, 1994) = Schmalenseeia jagoi; B. obscura Soloviev, 1969; B. ovata Zhou & Yuan, 1980

Extinct genus of trilobites

Burlingia is a rare and diminutive genus of trilobite, that lived during the early to middle Middle Cambrian (Acadoparadoxides pinus- to Ptychagnostus punctuosus-zone). Species assigned to Burlingia have been found in Norway, Sweden, Northern Siberia, and South-eastern China.

== Taxonomy ==
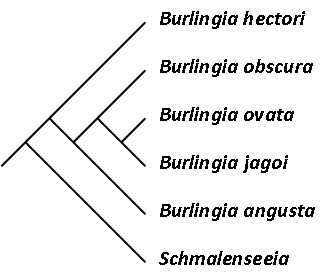
Cladogram of the trilobite genus Burlingia

Burlingia is the earlier genus of the family Burlingiidae, so it is presumable ancestral to the only other genus in this family, Schmalenseeia.

== Description ==
Like all burlingiids, Burlingia is small (less than 1 cm long), has an overall ovate shape, proparian facial sutures, and raised anterior borders of the pleurae. Burlingia has between 10 and 15 thorax segments, while Schmalenseeia has between 7 and 9. It is however difficult to determine where the thorax meets the pygidium, particularly because uniquely, in Burlingia the pleurae of the pygidium are not fused. Burlingia differs further from most Schmalenseeia-species with the exception of S. acutangula in having a parallel-sided glabella that is abruptly rounded at front, and there is no ridge connecting the front of the glabella with the anterior border (the so-called plectrum).
