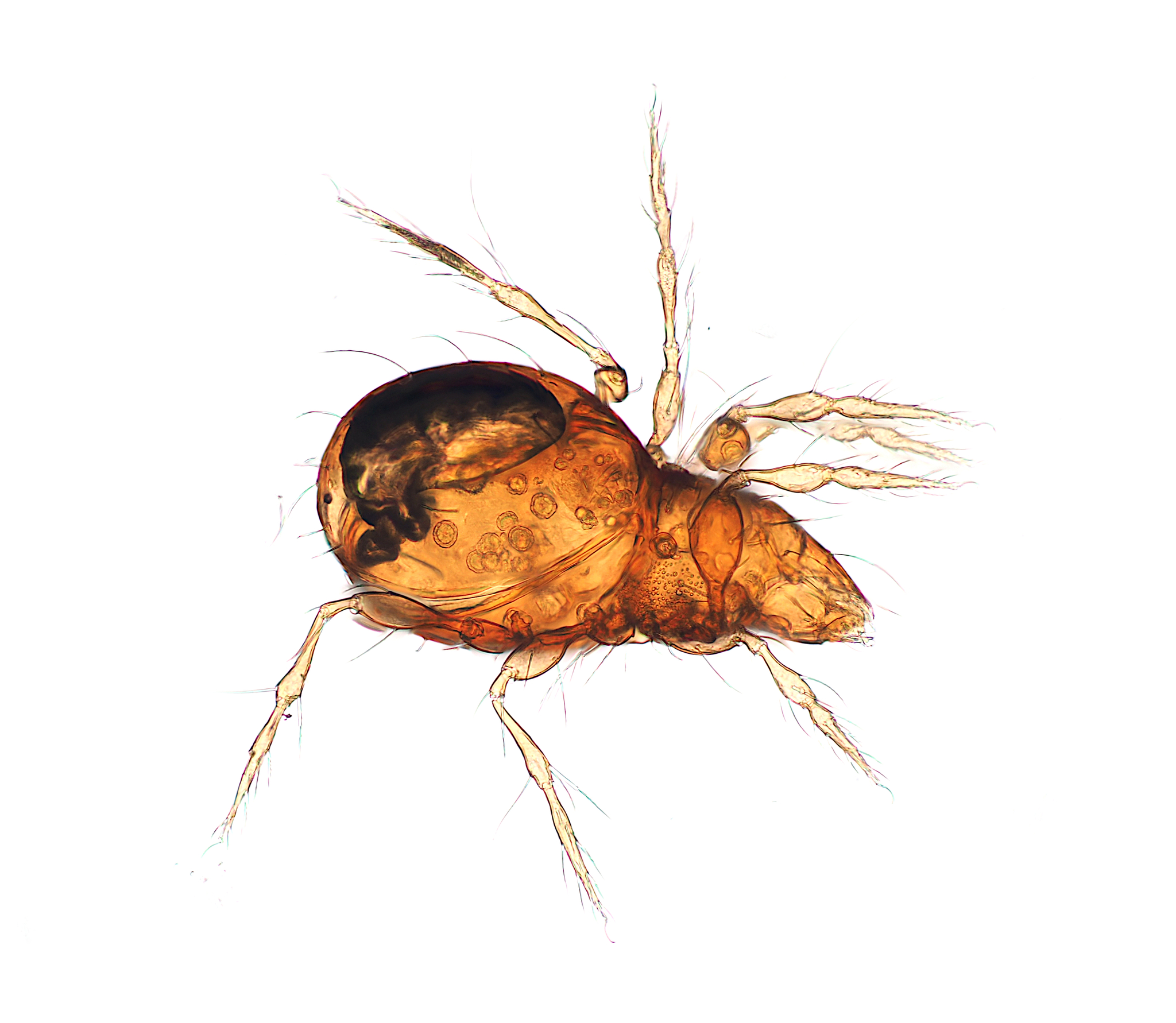
- Ctenoppia variopectinata

Scientific classification
- Kingdom: Animalia
- Phylum: Arthropoda
- Subphylum: Chelicerata
- Class: Arachnida
- Order: Oribatida
- Suborder: Brachypylina
- Section: Pycnonoticae
- Superfamily: Oppioidea
- Family: Oppiidae; Grandjean, 1954

= Oppiidae =

Family of mites

Oppiidae is a family of mites belonging to the order Sarcoptiformes.

== Taxonomy ==
Genera:

- Abchasiella Gordeeva & Tarba, 1990
- Acroppia Balogh, 1983
- Acutoppia Balogh, 1983
- Aeroppia Balogh, 1965
- Aeroppia Hammer, 1961
- Aethioppia Balogh, 1983
- Afroppia Koçak & Kemal, 2008
- Amerioppia Hammer, 1961
- Anomaloppia Subías, 1978
- Antilloppia Mahunka, 1985
- Arcoppia Hammer, 1977
- Austroppia Balogh, 1983
- Autoppia Golosova & Karppinen, 1983
- Baioppia Luxton, 1985
- Baloghoppia Mahunka, 1983
- Basidoppia Mahunka, 1983
- Basiloppia Balogh, 1983
- Belloppia Hammer, 1968
- Berniniella Balogh, 1983
- Brachiopiella
- Brachioppia Hammer, 1961
- Brachioppiella Hammer, 1962
- Branchioppia
- Brassoppia Balogh, 1983
- Campbelloppia Luxton, 1985
- Cassioppia Poltavska, 1994
- Chavinia Hammer, 1961
- Cheloppia Hammer, 1971
- Chuoppia Tseng, 1982
- Coetzeella Ermilov, Hugo-Coetzee & Khaustov, 2107
- Condyloppia Balogh, 1983
- Congoppia Balogh, 1983
- Convergoppia Balogh, 1983
- Corynoppia Balogh, 1983
- Cryptoppia Csiszár, 1961
- Ctenoppia Balogh, 1983
- Ctenoppiella Gordeeva & Karppinen, 1988
- Cubaoppia Balogh, 1983
- Cycloppia Balogh, 1983
- Damaeoppia Ohkubo, 1995
- Discoppia Balogh, 1983
- Dissorhina Hull, 1916
- Drepanoppia Balogh, 1983
- Elaphoppia Balogh, 1983
- Erioppia Balogh, 1983
- Exanthoppia J. & P.Balogh, 1983
- Fineoppia Khanbeki & Gordee, 1991
- Foraminoppia Subías & Arillo, 1998
- Fossoppia Mahunka, 1994
- Foveolatoppia Mahunka, 1988
- Furculoppia P.Balogh, 1983
- Fusuloppia Balogh, 1983
- Geminoppia J. & P.Balogh, 1983
- Gittella Hammer, 1961
- Globoppia Hammer, 1962
- Goyoppia Balogh, 1983
- Graptoppia Balogh, 1983
- Gressittoppia Balogh, 1983
- Hamoppia Hammer, 1968
- Helioppia Balogh, 1983
- Heteroppia Balogh, 1970
- Hypogeoppia Subías, 1981
- Insculptoppia Subías, 1980
- Intermedioppia Subías & Rodríguez, 1987
- Javieroppia Mínguez & Subías, 1986
- Jermyia Mahunka, 2002
- Joboppia Ruiz, Mínguez & Subías, 1988
- Karenella Hammer, 1962
- Kokoppia Balogh, 1983
- Kulievia Vasiliu & Ivan, 1999
- Laminoppia Hammer, 1968
- Lanceoppia Balogh, 1965
- Lanceoppia Hammer, 1962
- Laroppia Subías, 1989
- Lasiobelba Aoki, 1959
- Lauroppia Subías & Mínguez, 1986
- Lemuroppia Mahunka, 1994
- Leptoppia Mahunka, 1997
- Liacaroppia Subías & Rodríguez, 1986
- Lineoppia J. & P.Balogh, 1983
- Loboppia Balogh, 1983
- Mahunkella Balogh, 1983
- Medioppia Subías & Mínguez, 1985
- Medioxyoppia Subías, 1989
- Membranoppia Hammer, 1968
- Microppia Balogh, 1983
- Mimoppia Balogh, 1983
- Minoricoppia
- Miroppia Hammer, 1968
- Moritzoppia Subías & Rodríguez, 1988
- Moritzoppiella Gordeeva, 2000
- Multimedioppia Subías, 1991
- Multioppia Balogh, 1965
- Multioppia Hammer, 1961
- Multipulchroppia Subías, 1989
- Mystroppia Balogh, 1959
- Neoamerioppia Subías, 1989
- Neoameroppia Subias, 1989
- Neoppia Bhattacharya & Banerjee, 1981
- Neostrinatina Mahunka, 1980
- Neotrichoppia Subías & Iturrondobeitia, 1980
- Nesoppia Luxton, 1985
- Niloppia Balogh, 1983
- Nosybelba Mahunka, 1994
- Octoppia Balogh & Mahunka, 1969
- Oligoppia Balogh, 1983
- Operculoppia Hammer, 1968
- Oppia Koch, 1835
- Oppiella Jacot, 1937
- Oppiella nova Oudemans, 1902
- Oppites Pampaloni
- Otoppia Balogh, 1983
- Oxybrachioppia Subías, 1989
- Oxybrachyoppia Subias, 1989
- Oxymystroppia Subías & Shtanchaeva, 2011
- Oxyoppia Balogh & Mahunka, 1969
- Oxyoppioides Subías & Mínguez, 1985
- Paramedioppia Mahunka & Mahunka-Papp, 2000
- Pararamusella Mahunka & Palacios-Vargas, 1998
- Paroppia Hammer, 1968
- Paternoppia Gil-Martín, Subías & Arillo, 2000
- Pletzenoppia Balogh, 1983
- Pluritrichoppia Subías & Arillo, 1989
- Polyoppia Hammer, 1968
- Porrhoppia Balogh, 1970
- Praoppiella Miko, Mourek, Meleg & Moldovan, 2012
- Pravoppia Luxton, 1985
- Processoppia Balogh, 1983
- Pseudoamerioppia Subías, 1989
- Pseudobrachioppiella Tseng, 1982
- Pseudobranchioppiella Tseng, 1982
- Pseudomultioppia Subías, 2018
- Ptiloppia Balogh, 1983
- Pulchroppia Hammer, 1979
- Pulchroppia Subias, 1989
- Pulchroppiella Balogh, 1983
- Pustuloppia Mahunka, 1994
- Quattoppiella Hugo-Coetzee, 2014
- Quinquoppia Tseng, 1982
- Radamoppia Mahunka, 1994
- Ramonoppia Morell, 1990
- Ramuloppia Balogh, 1961
- Ramusella Hammer, 1962
- Ramusella Subías, 1980
- Ramuselloppia Subías & Rodríguez, 1986
- Rhaphoppia Balogh, 1983
- Rhinoppia Balogh, 1983
- Rhinoppioides Miko, Mourek, Meleg & Moldovan, 2012
- Rugoppia Mahunka, 1986
- Sacculoppia Balogh & Mahunka, 1968
- Sceletoppia Mahunka & Mahunka-Papp, 2009
- Separatoppia Mahunka, 1983
- Serratoppia Subías & Mínguez, 1985
- Setoppia Balogh, 1983
- Setuloppia Balogh, 1983
- Similoppia Mahunka, 1983
- Solenoppia Hammer, 1968
- Sphagnoppia J. & P.Balogh, 1986
- Stachyoppia Balogh, 1961
- Striatoppia Balogh, 1958
- Subiasella Balogh, 1983
- Tainsculptoppia Subías & Shtanchaeva, 2011
- Taiwanoppia Tseng, 1982
- Tanzoppia Mahunka, 1988
- Tectoppia Wallwork, 1961
- Tetroppia Gordeeva, 1999
- Trapezoppia Balogh & Mahunka, 1969
- Trematoppia Balogh, 1964
- Tripiloppia Hammer, 1968
- Tuberoppia Golosova, 1974
- Ugandoppia Mahunka, 1998
- Uroppia Balogh, 1983
- Varioppia Mahunka, 1985
- Vietoppia Mahunka, 1988
- Wallworkoppia Subías, 1989
- Xenoppia Mahunka, 1982
