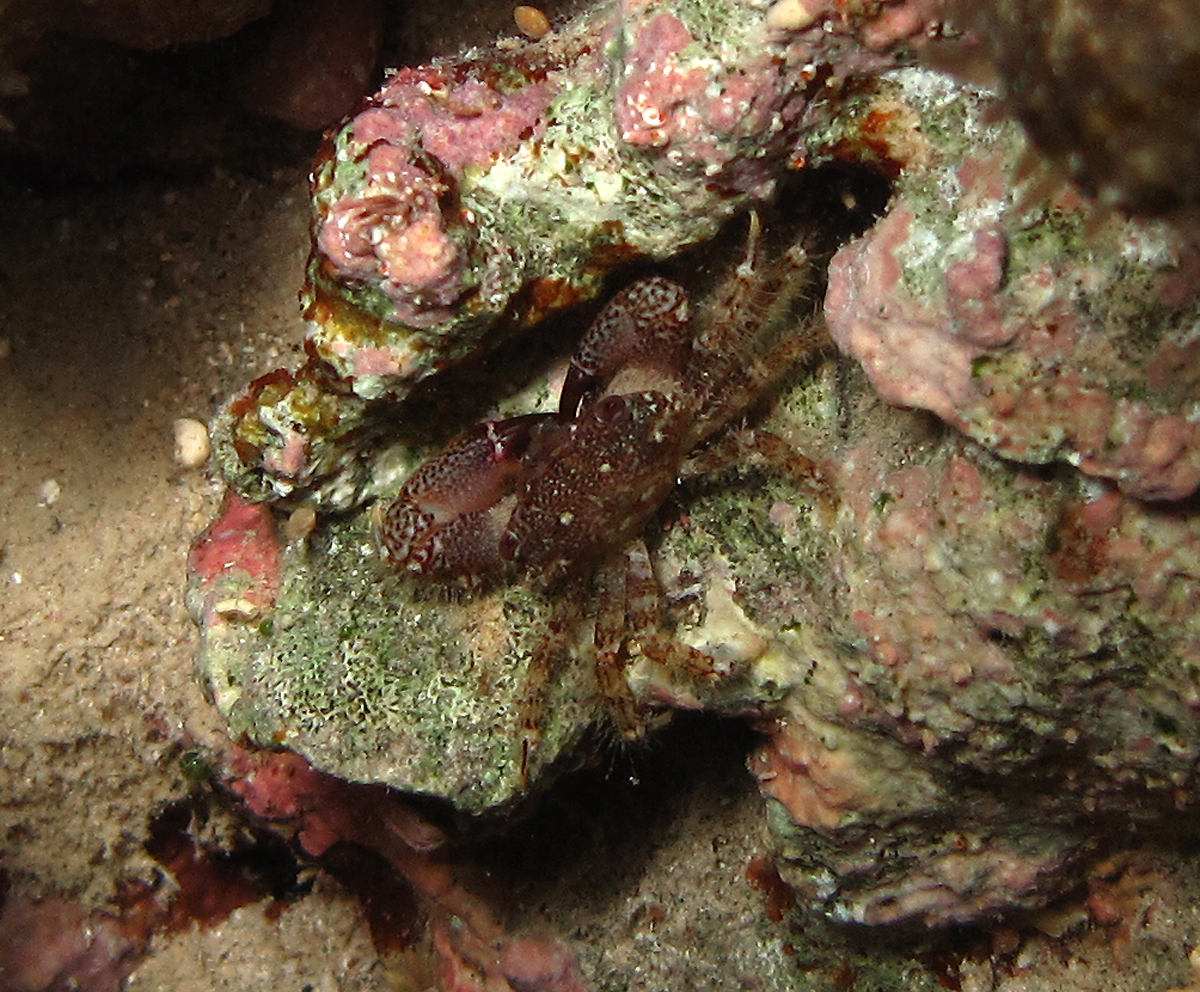
- Chlorodiella barbata

Scientific classification
- Domain: Eukaryota
- Kingdom: Animalia
- Phylum: Arthropoda
- Class: Malacostraca
- Order: Decapoda
- Suborder: Pleocyemata
- Infraorder: Brachyura
- Family: Xanthidae
- Subfamily: Chlorodiellinae
- Genus: Chlorodiella; Rathbun, 1897

= Chlorodiella =

Genus of crabs

Chlorodiella is a genus of crabs in the family Xanthidae, containing the following species:

- Chlorodiella barbata (Borradaile, 1900)
- Chlorodiella corallicola Miyake & Takeda, 1968
- Chlorodiella crispipleopa Dai, Yang, Song & Chen, 1986
- Chlorodiella cytherea (Dana, 1852)
- Chlorodiella davaoensis Ward, 1941
- Chlorodiella laevissima (Dana, 1852)
- Chlorodiella longimana (H. Milne-Edwards, 1834)
- Chlorodiella nigra (Forskål, 1775)
- Chlorodiella ohshimai Miyake & Takeda, 1967
- Chlorodiella quadrilobata Dai, Cai & Yang, 1996
- Chlorodiella spinimera Dai, Cai & Yang, 1996
- Chlorodiella xishaensis Chen & Lan, 1978
