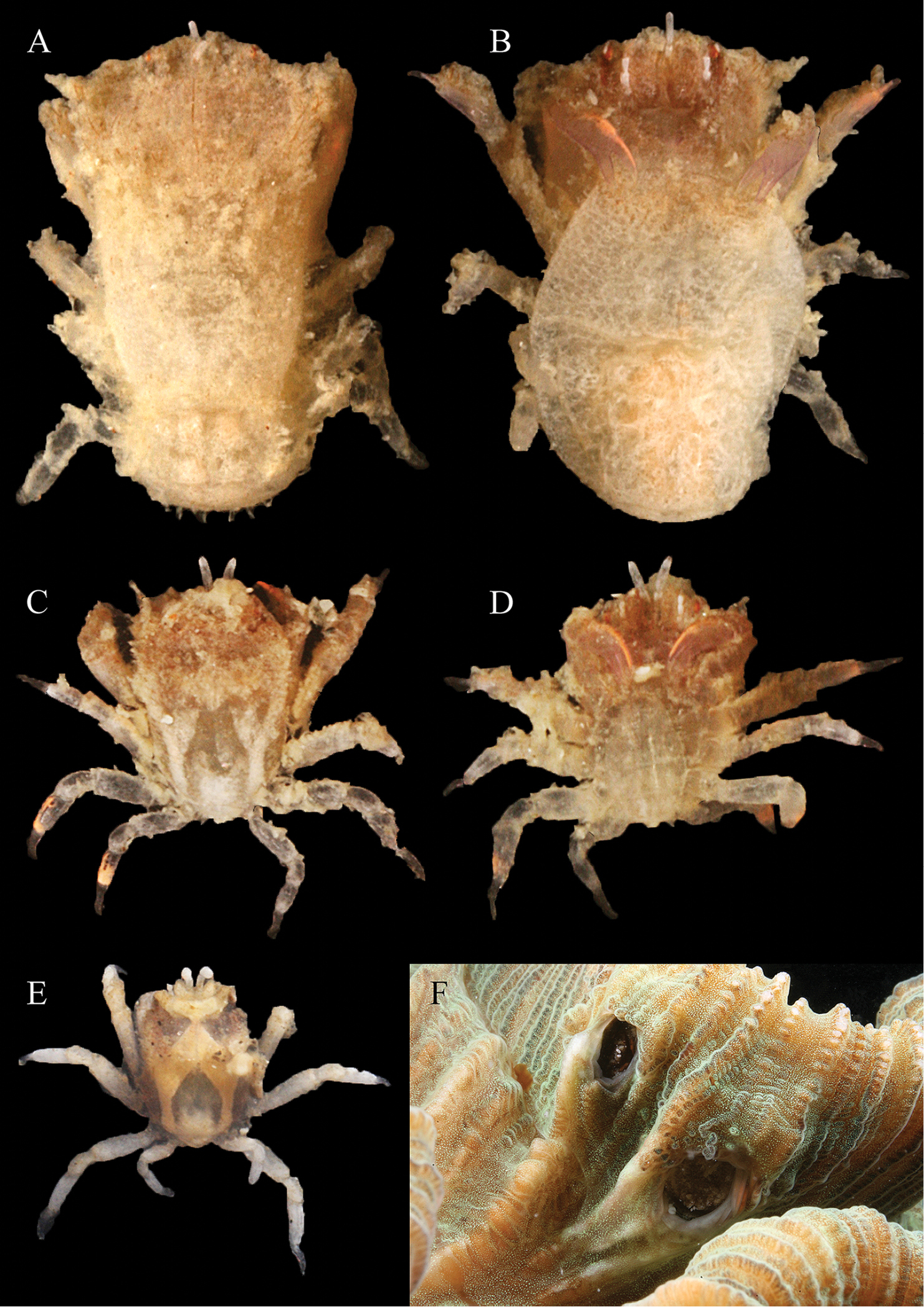
- Lithoscaptus semperi

Scientific classification
- Kingdom: Animalia
- Phylum: Arthropoda
- Clade: Pancrustacea
- Class: Malacostraca
- Order: Decapoda
- Suborder: Pleocyemata
- Infraorder: Brachyura
- Subsection: Thoracotremata
- Superfamily: Cryptochiroidea; Paul'son, 1875
- Family: Cryptochiridae; Paul'son, 1875

Genera
- 21, See text

= Cryptochiridae =

Cryptochiridae Temporal range: Piacenzian–Present

Family of crabs

Cryptochiridae is a family of crabs known commonly as gall crabs or coral gall crabs. They live inside dwellings in corals and cause the formation of galls in the coral structure. The family is currently placed in its own superfamily, Cryptochiroidea.

Gall crabs are sexually dimorphic, with males being much smaller than females. Contrary to females, most males are free-living and "visit" females for mating.

These crabs are most common in shallow waters where they live in association with stony corals, but they have also been recorded from mesophotic zones and deep waters. They likely feed on mucus secreted by their coral hosts, as well as various detritus. Some species are thought to be filter feeders.

Because crab size is related to gall size, it is likely that the crabs form the galls, rather than living randomly in a dwelling within a coral. Related groups of gall crab taxa share a similar gall type, suggesting that the crabs influence the morphology of the galls.

The family contains the following twenty-one genera:

- Cecidocarcinus Kropp & Manning, 1987
- Cryptochirus Heller, 1861
- Dacryomaia Kropp, 1990
- Detocarcinus Kropp & Manning, 1987
- Fizesereneia Takeda & Tamura, 1980
- Fungicola Serene, 1966
- †Galacticus Klompmaker, 2016
- Hapalocarcinus Stimpson, 1859
- Hiroia Takeda & Tamura, 1981
- Kroppcarcinus Badaro, Neves, Castro & Johnsson, 2012
- Lithoscaptus A. Milne-Edwards, 1862
- Luciades Kropp & Manning, 1996
- Neotroglocarcinus Fize & Serene, 1957
- Opecarcinus Kropp & Manning, 1987
- Pelycomaia Kropp, 1990
- Pseudocryptochirus Hiro, 1938
- Pseudohapalocarcinus Fize & Serène, 1956
- Sphenomaia Kropp, 1990
- Troglocarcinus Verrill, 1908
- Utinomiella Kropp & Takeda, 1988
- Xynomaia Kropp, 1990
- Zibrovia Kropp & Manning, 1996
