= Burlingiidae =

Burlingiidae Temporal range: Middle to lowest Upper Cambrian

Scientific classification
- Domain: Eukaryota
- Kingdom: Animalia
- Phylum: Arthropoda
- Class: †Trilobita
- Order: †incertae sedis
- Family: †Burlingiidae; Walcott, 1908

Genera
- Burlingia Walcott, 1908; Schmalenseeia Moberg, 1903

Extinct family of trilobites

The Burlingiidae constitute a family of trilobites of uncertain affinity, that lived during the Middle to lowest Upper Cambrian (Acadoparadoxides pinus- to Agnostus pisiformis-zone). Burlingiids have a cosmopolitan distribution, can be found in deposits that originate from outside the continental shelves, and may have been planktonic. They are characterized by their oval shape, small size (less than 1 centimetre or 0.39 inches), proparian sutures, and non-functional articulations of the thorax. Uniquely the anterior borders of the pleura are raised, and there are between 8 and 15 thorax segments. Burlingiid trilobites have been found in Norway, Sweden, Northern Siberia, Eastern and South-eastern China, Australia (Tasmania), India (Himalayas) and the United Kingdom.

== Taxonomy ==
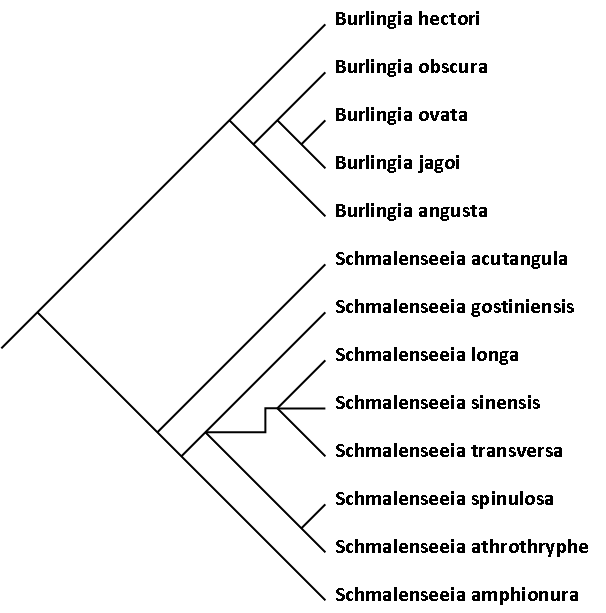
Cladogram of assumed relationships between species of the Burlingiidae

The relationship of the Burlingiidae with other Cambrian trilobites is uncertain. The only other group this early in trilobite evolution that has proparian sutures are the Eodiscina, but this suborder has many characters that make it very unlikely to be the ancestors of the burlingiids. Early scholars tentatively positioned the burlingiids in the Ptychopariida. The burlingiids have many more characters in common with the Redlichiina however, such as faintly imprinted glabellar furrows.
