= Notodromadidae =

Scientific classification
- Domain: Eukaryota
- Kingdom: Animalia
- Phylum: Arthropoda
- Class: Ostracoda
- Order: Podocopida
- Superfamily: Cypridoidea
- Family: Notodromadidae; Kaufmann, 1900

Family of crustaceans

Notodromadidae is a family of ostracods belonging to the order Podocopida.

Genera:

- Cyprois Zenker, 1854
- Gurayacypris Battish, 1987
- Indiacypris Hartmann, 1964
- Kennethia De Deckker, 1979
- Neozonocypris Klie, 1944
- Newnhamia King, 1855
- Notodromas Lilljeborg, 1853
