= Smarididae =

Smarididae Temporal range: Cretaceous–present

Scientific classification
- Kingdom: Animalia
- Phylum: Arthropoda
- Subphylum: Chelicerata
- Class: Arachnida
- Order: Trombidiformes
- Superfamily: Erythraeoidea
- Family: Smarididae; Kramer, 1878

Genera include
- Fessonia; Smaris †Immensmaris

Family of mites

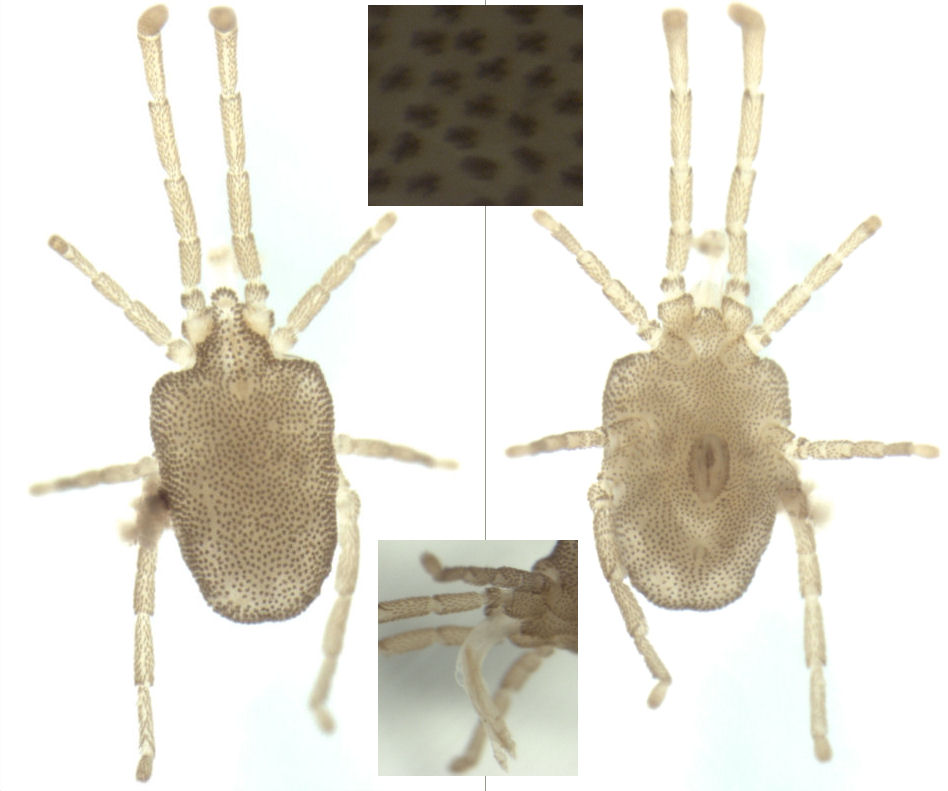
Smarididae, probably Hirstiosoma novaehollandiae

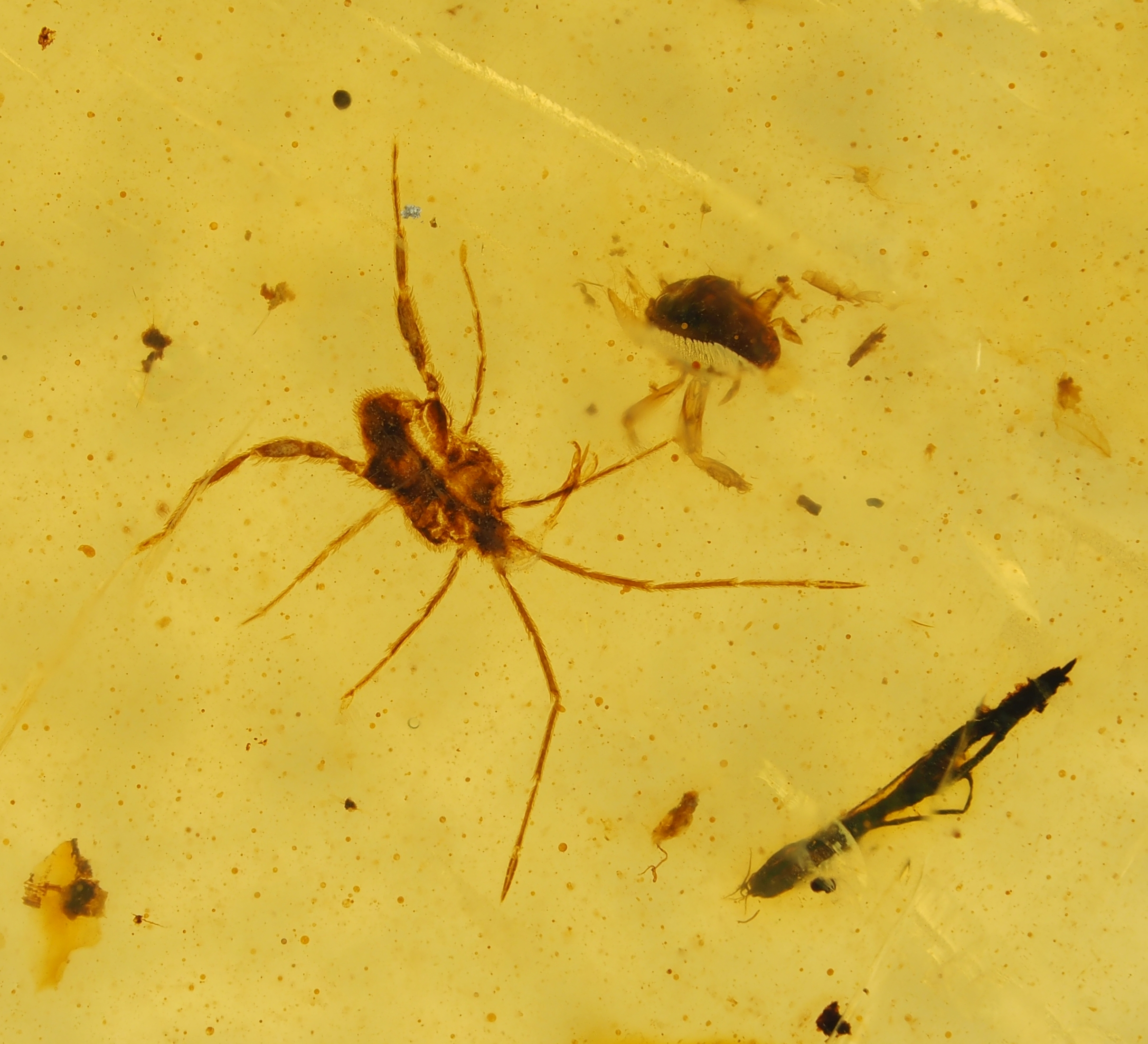
Fossil Smarididae in Cretaceous amber (Burmite) from Hkamti, Myanmar.

Smarididae is a family of mites belonging to the order Trombidiformes. These large predatory mites have long oval bodies, distinctively pointed in front. They are usually red and densely hairy with slender legs, sometimes very long. They have either one or two pairs of eyes.

== Fossil record ==
The Cretaceous smaridid Immensmaris chewbaccei had idiosoma of more than 8 mm (0.31 in) in length and was the largest fossil acariform mite and also the largest erythraeoid mite ever recorded.
