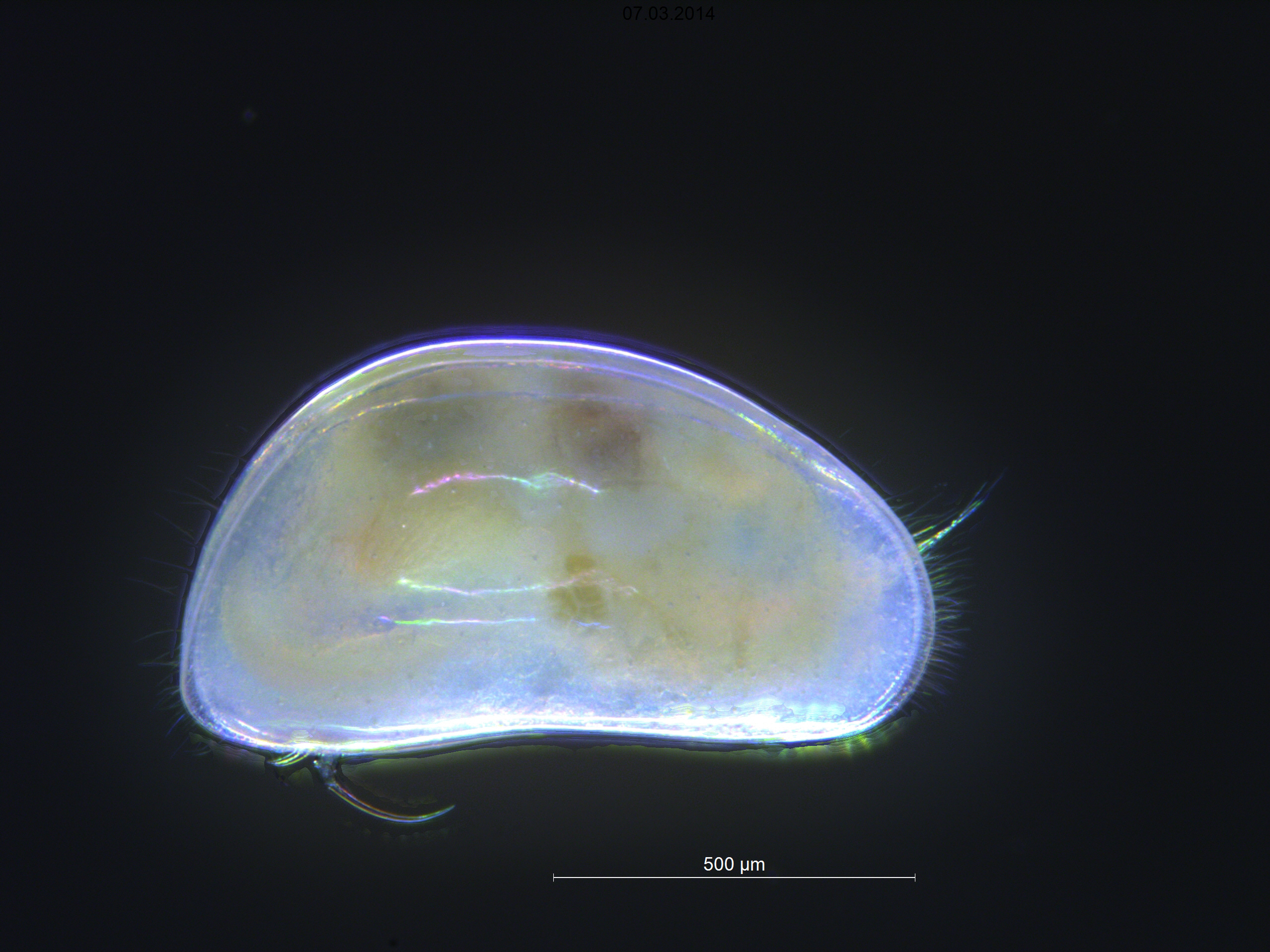
- Candona candida

Scientific classification
- Domain: Eukaryota
- Kingdom: Animalia
- Phylum: Arthropoda
- Class: Ostracoda
- Subclass: Podocopa
- Order: Podocopida; Sars, 1866

Subordinate taxa
- See text

= Podocopida =

Order of seed shrimps

The Podocopida are an order of ostracods in the subclass Podocopa. It is the most diverse of the five orders of ostracods, and the only one with freshwater species. The group also has a rich fossil record.

The superfamily Cytheroidea in the suborder Cytherocopina consists of non-swimming crawlers and burrowers. Most species are marine, but at least seven extant lineages have independently adapted to freshwater. The largest freshwater family is Limnocytheridae, with about 150 species in 20 genera.

== Taxonomy ==
The following suborders and unassigned taxa are contained in the order Podocopida:

- Superfamily †Carbonitacea
- Suborder Bairdiocopina
- Suborder Cypridocopina
- Suborder Cytherocopina
- Suborder Darwinulocopina
- Suborder Sigilliocopina

== See also ==
- Cyprididae
