= 2012 in arthropod paleontology =

This list of fossil arthropods described in 2012 is a list of new taxa of trilobites, fossil insects, crustaceans, arachnids and other fossil arthropods of every kind that have been described during the year 2012. The list only includes taxa at the level of genus or species.

== Arachnids ==
Name	Novelty	Status	Authors	Age	Unit	Location	Notes	Images
Ampezzoa	Gen. et sp. nov.	Valid	Lindquist & Grimaldi in Schmidt et al.	Carnian		Italy	A mite. The type species is Ampezzoa triassica.	
Archaelagonops	Gen. et sp. nov	Valid	Wunderlich	Cretaceous	Burmese amber	Myanmar	A member of Lagonomegopidae. Type species is A. salticoides.	
Baltleucauge propinqua	Sp. nov	Valid	Wunderlich	Eocene	Baltic amber	Europe	A long-jawed orb weaver	
Craspedisia yapchoontecki	Sp. nov.	Valid	Penney et al.	Miocene	Dominican amber	Dominican Republic	A theridiid	
Eodoter lonimammillae	Sp. nov	Valid	Wunderlich	Eocene	Baltic amber	Europe	A sac spider	
Eohalinobius calefactus	Sp. nov	Valid	Wunderlich	Eocene	Baltic amber	Europe	A succinomid	
Eohalinobius hiddenseeensis	Sp. nov	Valid	Wunderlich	Eocene	Baltic amber	Europe	A succinomid	
Eohalinobius patina	Sp. nov	Valid	Wunderlich	Eocene	Baltic amber	Europe	A succinomid	
?Eophantes seorsum	Sp. nov	Valid	Wunderlich	Eocene	Baltic amber	Europe	A linyphiid	
Ephalmator tredecim	Sp. nov	Valid	Wunderlich	Eocene	Baltic amber	Europe	An ephalmatorid	
Ero (Succinero) clunis	Sp. nov	Valid	Wunderlich	Eocene	Baltic amber	Europe	A pirate spider	
Ero (Succinero) gracilitibialis	Sp. nov	Valid	Wunderlich	Eocene	Baltic amber	Europe	A pirate spider	
Ero (Succinero) veta	Sp. nov	Valid	Wunderlich	Eocene	Baltic amber	Europe	A pirate spider	
Geratonephila	Gen. et sp. nov.	jr synonym	Poinar in Poinar & Buckley	Early Cretaceous	Burmese amber	Myanmar	A nephiline. The type species is G. burmanica. Moved to Nephila in 2015.	Nephila burmanica
Graea magnocoli	Sp. nov	Valid	Wunderlich	Eocene	Baltic amber	Europe	An orb-weaver spider	
Hypotheridiosoma	Gen. et sp. nov	Valid	Wunderlich	Cretaceous	Burmese amber	Myanmar	Originally classified as a ray spider, but subsequently transferred to the araneoid family Zarqaraneidae. The type species is H. paracymbium.	
Korearachne	gen et sp nov	Valid	Selden et al..	Early Cretaceous	Jinju Formation	South Korea	A member of Araneomorphae, possibly a lycosoid. The type species is K. jinju.	
Lagonoburmops	Gen. et sp. nov	Valid	Wunderlich	Cretaceous	Burmese amber	Myanmar	A member of Lagonomegopidae. The type species is L. plumosus.	
Leclercera longissipes	Sp. nov	Jr synonym	Wunderlich	Cretaceous	Burmese amber	Myanmar	A member of Psilodercidae. Originally described as a species of Leclercera, but subsequently transferred to the genus Priscaleclercera.	
Leclercera spicula	Sp. nov	Jr synonym	Wunderlich	Cretaceous	Burmese amber	Myanmar	A member of Psilodercidae. Originally described as a species of Leclercera, but subsequently transferred to the genus Priscaleclercera.	
Leviunguis	Gen. et sp. nov	Valid	Wunderlich	Cretaceous	Burmese amber	Myanmar	Originally classified as a ray spider, subsequently transferred to the separate araneoid family Leviunguidae. The type species is L. bruckschi.	
Mesobunus dunlopi	Sp. nov.	Valid	Giribet et al.	Middle Jurassic	Daohugou Beds	China	A sclerosomatid harvestman.	
Myanlagonops	Gen. et sp. nov	Valid	Wunderlich	Cretaceous	Burmese amber	Myanmar	A member of Lagonomegopidae. The type species is M. gracilipes.	
Ocululoborus	Gen. et sp. nov	Valid	Wunderlich	Cretaceous	Burmese amber	Myanmar	A member of Uloboridae. The type species is O. curvatus.	
Orchestina (Baltorchestina) angulata	Nom. nov	Valid	Wunderlich	Eocene	Bitterfeld amber	Germany	An oonopid; a replacement name for Orchestina (Baltorchestina) rectangulata Wunderlich (2011).	
Orchestina gappi	sp nov	Valid	Saupe et al..	Latest Albian or earliest Cenomanian	Chartense amber	France	An oonopid	
Orchestina rabagensis	Species	Valid	Saupe et al.	Early Albian		Spain	An oonopid, a species of Orchestina.	
Palaeogrosphus jacquesi	Sp. nov	Valid	Lourenço & Henderickx	Holocene	Malagasy copal	Madagascar	A buthid scorpion.	
Palaeoleptoneta	Gen. et sp. nov	Valid	Wunderlich	Cretaceous	Burmese amber	Myanmar	Originally described as a member of Leptonetidae, subsequently considered to be a member of Araneomorphae of uncertain affinities by Magalhaes et al.. The type species is P. calcar.	
Palaeolychas weitschati	Sp. nov.	Valid	Lourenço	Eocene		Russia (Kaliningrad Oblast)	A buthid scorpion, a species of Palaeolychas.	
Palaeotrilineatus	Gen. et sp. nov.	Valid	Lourenço	Early Cretaceous	Burmese amber	Myanmar	A scorpion. The type species is P. ellenbergeri.	
?Pholcochyrocer baculum	Sp. nov	Valid	Wunderlich	Cretaceous	Burmese amber	Myanmar	A member of Pholcochyroceridae, possibly a species of Pholcochyrocer.	
Pholcochyrocer pecten	Sp. nov	Valid	Wunderlich	Cretaceous	Burmese amber	Myanmar	A member of Pholcochyroceridae, a species of Pholcochyrocer.	
Piankhi	Gen. et sp. nov.	Valid	Dunlop, Bartel & Mitov	Eocene	Baltic amber	Europe	A harvestman found in Baltic amber. The type species is P. steineri.	Piankhi steineri
?Poliochera cretacea	Sp. nov	Valid	Wunderlich	Cretaceous	Burmese amber	Myanmar	A member of Ricinulei. Originally described as a possible species of Poliochera, but subsequently transferred to the separate genus Protoricinus.	
Praoppiella	Gen. et sp. nov.	Valid	Miko & Mourek in Miko et al.	Early Pleistocene		Slovenia	A mite. The type species is P. oanae.	
Pseudogarypus synchrotron	Sp. nov	Valid	Henderickx in Henderickx, Tafforeau & Soriano	Late Eocene	Baltic Amber	Europe	A pseudoscorpion	Pseudogarypus synchrotron
?Psiloderces filiformis	Sp. nov	Valid	Wunderlich	Cretaceous	Burmese amber	Myanmar	First described as possibly species of Psiloderces; transferred to the genus Eopsiloderces.	
Rhinoppioides	Gen. et sp. nov.	Valid	Miko in Miko et al.	Early Pleistocene		Slovenia	A mite. The type species is R. quadrituberculatus.	
Saetosoma	Gen. et sp. nov	Valid	Wunderlich	Cretaceous	Burmese amber	Myanmar	A member of Tetrablemmidae. The type species is S. filiembolus.	
Samlandicmeta	Gen. et sp. nov	Valid	Wunderlich	Eocene	Baltic amber	Europe	A long-jawed orb weaver. The type species is S. mutila.	
?Scytodes hani	Sp. nov	Valid	Wunderlich	Cretaceous	Lebanese amber	Jordan	A spider of uncertain affinities. Originally described as a spitting spider, possibly a species of Scytodes; Magalhaes et al. subsequently argued that it cannot be reliably assigned to Scytodoidea.	
Succiniropsis runcinata	Sp. nov	Valid	Wunderlich	Eocene	Baltic amber	Europe	A zoropsid.	
?Succinomus gibbosus	Sp. nov	Valid	Wunderlich	Eocene	Baltic amber	Europe	A succinomid, possibly a species of Succinomus.	
Trhypochthonius lopezvallei	Sp. nov.	Valid	Arillo, Subías & Shtanchaeva	Early Cretaceous (Albian)		Spain	A trhypochthoniid mite.	
Triasacarus	Gen. et sp. nov.	Valid	Lindquist & Grimaldi in Schmidt et al.	Carnian		Italy	A mite. The type species is T. fedelei.	

== Crustaceans ==
Name	Novelty	Status	Authors	Age	Unit	Location	Notes	Images
Acanthocythereis inouei	Sp. nov	Valid	Yamaguchi, Mashiba & Kamiya	Miocene	Osaki Formation	Japan	An ostracod, a species of Acanthocythereis.	
Acanthophoenicides	Gen. et sp. nov	Valid	Audo & Charbonnier	Late Cretaceous (Cenomanian)	Hadjoula Lagerstätte	Lebanon	A slipper lobster belonging to the subfamily Arctidinae. The type species is A. peterpani.	
Acratia candyae	Sp. nov	Valid	Forel	Late Permian (Changhsingian)	Wujiaping Formation	China	An acratiid ostracod, a species of Acratia.	
Agnocarcinus	Gen. et sp. nov	Valid	Beschin et al.	Eocene (Lutetian)		Italy	A crab belonging to the family Pilumnidae. The type species is A. zannatoi.	
Alberticarcinus	Gen. et sp. nov	Valid	Beschin et al.	Eocene (Lutetian)		Italy	A crab belonging to the family Atelecyclidae. The type species is A. eocaenus.	
Ammopylocheles robertboreki	Sp. nov	Valid	Fraaije et al.	Middle Oxfordian		Poland	A pylochelid, a species of Ammopylocheles.	
Amphicytherura grandicribra	Sp. nov	Valid	Puckett & Colin in Puckett, Colin & Mitchell	Late Cretaceous (Maastrichtian)		Jamaica	A schizocytherid ostracod, a species of Amphicytherura.	
Amphicytherura occulta	Sp. nov	Valid	Puckett & Colin in Puckett, Colin & Mitchell	Late Cretaceous (Maastrichtian)		Jamaica	An ostracod. Originally described as a species of Amphicytherura; Antonietto et al. (2013) transferred this species to the genus Dinglecythere.	
Amphissites gifuensis	Sp. nov	Valid	Tanaka & Yuan in Tanaka et al.	Early Permian		Japan	An ostracod, a species of Amphissites.	
Antonioranina	Gen. et comb. nov	Valid	Van Bakel et al.	Eocene		Italy; Spain; United States	A raninid crab. The type species is "Cyrtorhina" globosa Beschin, Busulini, De Angeli & Tessier (1988); genus also contains A. fusseli (Blow & Manning, 1996) and A. ripacurtae (Artal & Castillo, 2005). Van Bakel et al. (2012) tentatively assigned "Cyrtorhina" oblonga Beschin, Busulini, De Angeli & Tessier (1988) to the genus Antonioranina as well; however, Karasawa et al. (2014) made it the type species of a separate genus Claudioranina.	
Archaeoniscus coreaensis	Sp. nov	Valid	Park et al.	Early Cretaceous	Jinju Formation	South Korea	An isopod crustacean, a species of Archaeoniscus.	Archaeoniscus coreaensis
Asciocythere cabbagehillensis	Sp. nov	Valid	Puckett & Colin in Puckett, Colin & Mitchell	Late Cretaceous (Maastrichtian)		Jamaica	A cytherideid ostracod, a species of Asciocythere.	
Asymmetricythere semoupathei	Sp. nov	Valid	Sarr	Ypresian to Lutetian		Mauritania; Senegal	A trachyleberidid ostracod, a species of Asymmetricythere.	
Aurikirkbya miyakei	Sp. nov	Valid	Tanaka & Ono in Tanaka et al.	Early Permian		Japan	An ostracod, a species of Aurikirkbya.	
Aysegulina chapeltonensis	Sp. nov	Valid	Puckett & Colin in Puckett, Colin & Mitchell	Late Cretaceous (Maastrichtian)		Jamaica	A hemicytherid ostracod, a species of Aysegulina.	
Aysegulina riominhoensis	Sp. nov	Valid	Puckett & Colin in Puckett, Colin & Mitchell	Late Cretaceous (Maastrichtian)		Jamaica	A hemicytherid ostracod, a species of Aysegulina.	
Aysegulina sagitta	Sp. nov	Valid	Puckett & Colin in Puckett, Colin & Mitchell	Late Cretaceous (Maastrichtian)		Jamaica	A hemicytherid ostracod, a species of Aysegulina.	
Aysegulina ventrocurva	Sp. nov	Valid	Puckett & Colin in Puckett, Colin & Mitchell	Late Cretaceous (Maastrichtian)		Jamaica	A hemicytherid ostracod, a species of Aysegulina.	
Bairdia adelineae	Sp. nov	Valid	Forel	Early Triassic (Griesbachian)	Daye Formation	China	A bairdiid ostracod, a species of Bairdia.	
Bairdia fujisan	Sp. nov	Valid	Tanaka & Maeda in Tanaka et al.	Early Permian		Japan	An ostracod, a species of Bairdia.	
Bairdia? huberti	Sp. nov	Valid	Forel	Late Permian (Changhsingian)	Wujiaping Formation	China	A bairdiid ostracod, a possible species of Bairdia.	
Bairdia ikeyai	Sp. nov	Valid	Tanaka in Tanaka et al.	Early Permian		Japan	An ostracod, a species of Bairdia.	
Bairdia jeromei	Sp. nov	Valid	Forel	Late Permian (Changhsingian) and Early Triassic (Griesbachian)	Daye Formation; Wujiaping Formation	China	A bairdiid ostracod, a species of Bairdia.	
Bairdia minoensis	Sp. nov	Valid	Tanaka & Ono in Tanaka et al.	Early Permian		Japan	An ostracod, a species of Bairdia.	
Bairdia spindlica	Sp. nov	Valid	Tanaka & Yuan in Tanaka et al.	Early Permian		Japan	An ostracod, a species of Bairdia.	
Balowella crassicostata	Sp. nov	Valid	Luppold	Middle Jurassic		Germany	An ostracod, a species of Balowella.	
Bathypluma pliocenica	Sp. nov	Valid	Garassino, Pasini & Marini	Early Pliocene		Italy	A retroplumid crab, a species of Bathypluma.	
Bournelyreidus	Gen. et comb. et sp. nov	Valid	Van Bakel et al.	Late Cretaceous to Paleocene		Denmark; France; Germany; Greenland; United States	A lyreidid crab. The type species is "Hemioon" eysunesensis Collins & Wienberg Rasmussen (1992); according to the authors of its description genus also contains "Raninella" carlilensis Feldmann & Maxey (1980), "Palaeocorystes" laevis Schlüter in von der Marck & Schlüter (1868), "Raninella" manningi Bishop & Williams (2000), "Raninella" oaheensis Bishop (1978) and "Raninella" tridens Roberts (1962), as well as the new species Bournelyreidus teodorii. On the other hand, Karasawa et al. (2014) transferred B. teodorii to the genus Lyreidus, "R." tridens to the genus Macroacaena and "R." manningi to the genus Heus.	
Brachycythere jamaicaensis	Sp. nov	Valid	Puckett & Colin in Puckett, Colin & Mitchell	Late Cretaceous (Maastrichtian)		Jamaica	A trachyleberidid ostracod, a species of Brachycythere.	
Bretonia	gen et comb nov	Valid	Schweitzer et al.	Cenomanian	Sables du Perche Formation	France	crab, New genus for "Xanthosia" danielae (Collins and Breton, 2009).	
Buntonia bodergati	Sp. nov	Valid	Sarr	Thanetian to Ypresian		Mali; Senegal	A trachyleberidid ostracod, a species of Buntonia.	
Buntonia nana	Sp. nov	Valid	Puckett & Colin in Puckett, Colin & Mitchell	Late Cretaceous (Maastrichtian)		Jamaica	A trachyleberidid ostracod, a species of Buntonia.	
Buntonia vulgaris	Sp. nov	Valid	Puckett & Colin in Puckett, Colin & Mitchell	Late Cretaceous (Maastrichtian)		Jamaica	A trachyleberidid ostracod, a species of Buntonia.	
Bythocypris antoniettae	Sp. nov	Valid	Sciuto	Early Pleistocene		Italy	An ostracod, a species of Bythocypris.	
Bythocythere solisdeus	Sp. nov	Valid	Sciuto	Early Pleistocene		Italy	A bythocytherid ostracod, a species of Bythocythere.	
Calliaxina altavillensis	Sp. nov	Valid	Beschin & De Angeli	Eocene		Italy	A member of Callianassidae.	
Carinokloedenia onusta carinata	Subsp. nov	Valid	Becker & Franke	Devonian		Germany; Luxembourg	An ostracod belonging to the group Palaeocopida and the family Beyrichiidae.	
Carcinoplax parsensis	Sp. nov	Valid	Vega et al.	Miocene (Burdigalian or Langhian)	Mishan Formation	Iran	A goneplacid decapod crustacean, a species of Carcinoplax.	
Carpopenaeus garassinoi	Sp. nov	Valid	Charbonnier in Petit & Charbonnier	Late Cretaceous	Sahel Alma Lagerstätte	Lebanon		
Cenocorystes bretoni	Sp. nov	Valid	Van Bakel et al.	Late Cretaceous (late Cenomanian)		France	A palaeocorystid crab, a species of Cenocorystes.	
Cenomanocarcinus cantabricus	Sp. nov	Valid	Van Bakel et al.	Early Cretaceous (Albian)		Spain	A cenomanocarcinid crab, a species of Cenomanocarcinus.	
Coleia martinlutheri	sp nov	Valid	Schweigert & Ernst	Sinemurian		Germany	A coleiid polychelid, a species of Coleia.	
Cretacolana	Gen. et comb. nov	Valid	Schweitzer & Feldmann	Cenomanian		France	A porcelain crab, a new genus for "Porcellana" antiqua A. Milne-Edwards, 1862.	
Cretatrizocheles	gen et sp nov	Valid	Fraaije, Klompmaker, & Artal	Albian or Cenomanian		Spain	A hermit crab. The type species is Cretatrizocheles olazagutiensis.	
Cromimaia	Gen. et comb. nov	Valid	Beschin et al.	Eocene		Italy	A crab belonging to the family Majidae. The type species is "Micromaia" meneguzzoi Beschin, Busulini, De Angeli & Tessier (1985); genus also includes "Micromaia" elegans Beschin, Busulini, De Angeli & Tessier (1985).	
Cushmanidea tessieri	Sp. nov	Valid	Sarr	Ypresian to Lutetian		Senegal	A cushmanideid ostracod, a species of Buntonia.	
Cytherelloidea guineacornensis	Sp. nov	Valid	Puckett in Puckett, Colin & Mitchell	Late Cretaceous (Maastrichtian)	Guinea Corn Formation	Jamaica	A cytherellid ostracod, a species of Cytherelloidea.	
Cytheropteron eleonorae	Sp. nov	Valid	Sciuto	Early Pleistocene		Italy	A cytherurid ostracod, a species of Cytheropteron.	
Cytheropteron italoi	Sp. nov	Valid	Sciuto	Early Pleistocene		Italy	An ostracod, a species of Cytheropteron.	
Cytheropteron rossanae	Sp. nov	Valid	Sciuto	Early Pleistocene		Italy	An ostracod, a species of Cytheropteron.	
Daira coccoi	Sp. nov	Valid	Beschin et al.	Eocene (Lutetian)		Italy	A crab belonging to the family Dairidae; a species of Daira.	
Dinochelus steeplensis	Sp. nov	Valid	Tshudy & Saward	Eocene (Ypresian)	London Clay	United Kingdom	A lobster, a species of Dinochelus.	
Distefania renefraaijei	Sp. nov	Valid	Klompmaker, Feldmann & Schweitzer	Cretaceous (Albian or Cenomanian)		Spain	A goniodromitid crab, a species of Distefania.	
Dolocythere tuberculata	Sp. nov	Valid	Luppold	Middle Jurassic		Germany	An ostracod. Originally described as a species of Dolocythere; Lord, Cabral & Danielopol (2020) transferred this species to the genus Minyocythere.	
Ebullitiocaris elatus	Sp. nov	Valid	Womack et al.	Carboniferous		United Kingdom	A member of Cladocera, a species of Ebullitiocaris.	
Eocytheropteron hazeli	Sp. nov	Valid	Puckett & Colin in Puckett, Colin & Mitchell	Late Cretaceous (Maastrichtian)		Jamaica	A cytherurid ostracod, a species of Eocytheropteron.	
Eocytheropteron jamaicaensis	Sp. nov	Valid	Puckett & Colin in Puckett, Colin & Mitchell	Late Cretaceous (Maastrichtian)		Jamaica	A cytherurid ostracod, a species of Eocytheropteron.	
Eouroptychus	Gen. et sp. nov	Valid	De Angeli & Ceccon	Eocene (Ypresian)		Italy	A member of Chirostylidae. The type species is E. montemagrensis.	
Eucytherura mitchelli	Sp. nov	Valid	Puckett & Colin in Puckett, Colin & Mitchell	Late Cretaceous (Maastrichtian)		Jamaica	A cytherurid ostracod, a species of Eucytherura.	
Eomunidopsis aldoirarensis	Sp. nov	Valid	Klompmaker et al.	Cretaceous (Albian or Cenomanian)		Spain	A galatheoid, a species of Eomunidopsis.	
Eopaguropsis nidiaquilae	Sp. nov	Valid	Fraaije et al.	Oxfordian		Poland	A diogenid, a species of Eopaguropsis.	
Eosymethis	Gen. et sp. nov	Valid	Van Bakel et al.	Eocene (Ypresian)	Roda Formation	Spain	A raninid crab. The type species is Eosymethis aragonensis.	
Eohexapus orthogonius	Sp. nov	Valid	Beschin et al.	Eocene (Lutetian)		Italy	A crab belonging to the family Hexapodidae.	
Eucorystes iserbyti	Sp. nov	Valid	Van Bakel et al.	Early Cretaceous (Albian)		France	A palaeocorystid crab, a species of Eucorystes.	
Eucorystes navarrensis	Sp. nov	Valid	Van Bakel et al.	Early Cretaceous (Albian)		Spain	A palaeocorystid crab, a species of Eucorystes.	
Faksecarcinus	gen et comb nov	Valid	Schweitzer et al.	Albian or Cenomanian to Danian		Denmark Spain	A crab, a new genus for "Xanthosia" gracilis.	
Ferroranina	Gen. et comb. et sp. nov	Valid	Van Bakel et al.	Late Cretaceous (late Cenomanian to late Campanian)		Czech Republic; India; Madagascar; Mexico; United States	A palaeocorystid crab. The type species is "Notopocorystes" dichrous Stenzel (1945); genus also contains "Notopocorystes" australis Secretan (1964) and "Notopocorystes" fritschi Glaessner (1929), as well as the new species Ferroranina tamilnadu.	
Floricythereis	Gen. et sp. et comb. nov		Puckett & Colin in Puckett, Colin & Mitchell	Late Cretaceous (Maastrichtian)		Jamaica; United States	A trachyleberidid ostracod. Genus includes new species Floricythereis exquisita, as well as F. lixula (Crane, 1965) (the type species was not designated).	
Galathea mainensis	Sp. nov	Valid	Ceccon & De Angeli	Middle Eocene		Italy	A species of Galathea.	
Gebiacantha tuscia	Sp. nov	Valid	Garassino, Pasini, De Angeli & Charbonnier in Garassino et al.	Early Pliocene		Italy	An upogebiid decapod, a species of Gebiacantha.	
Geffenina mariebeatriceae	Sp. nov	Valid	Chitnarin in Chitnarin et al.	Late Early Permian	Tak Fa Formation	Thailand	A knoxitid palaeocopidan ostracod, a species of Geffenina.	
Geffenina mariebeatriceae	Sp. nov	Valid	Chitnarin in Chitnarin et al.	Early Permian	Pha Nok Khao Formation	Thailand	A knoxitid palaeocopidan ostracod, a species of Geffenina.	
Glyphea wiffenae	Species	Valid	Feldmann and Stilwell	Late Cretaceous	Maungataniwa Sandstone	New Zealand	A glypheid lobster, a species of Glyphea.	
Glyptopleura mugiensis	Sp. nov	Valid	Tanaka & Yuan in Tanaka et al.	Early Permian		Japan	An ostracod, a species of Glyptopleura.	
Goniodromites kubai	sp nov	Valid	Starzyk, Krzemiska, & Krzemiski	Oxfordian		Poland	A crab, a species of Goniodromites.	
Gonioplacoides	Gen. et sp. nov	Valid	Quayle & Collins	Eocene	Headon Hill Formation	United Kingdom	A goneplacid. The type species is Gonioplacoides minuta.	
Graptocarcinus urbasaensis	Sp. nov	Valid	Van Bakel et al.	Late Cretaceous		Spain	A dynomenid crab, a species of Graptocarcinus.	
Grinioneis pachycosta	Sp. nov	Valid	Guernet et al.	Eocene (Lutetian)	Paris Basin	France	A trachyleberidid ostracod, a species of Grinioneis.	
Grolamaia	Gen. et sp. nov	Valid	Beschin et al.	Eocene (Lutetian)		Italy	A crab belonging to the subfamily Pisinae. The type species is G. vicariottoi.	
Hadrocarcinus	gen et comb et sp nov	Valid	Schweitzer, Feldmann & Lamanna	Late Cretaceous		Antarctica	A necrocarcinid crab, a new genus for "Necrocarcinus" wrighti. The genus also contains "Necrocarcinus" carinatus and a new species Hadrocarcinus tectilacus.	
Harbinia alta	Sp. nov	Valid	Antonietto et al.	Aptian or early Albian	Santana Formation	Brazil	An ostracod crustacean, a species of Harbinia.	
Headonipus	Gen. et sp. nov	Valid	Quayle & Collins	Late Eocene	Headon Beds	United Kingdom	A hexapodid. The type species is Headonipus tuberculatus.	
Hemiparacytheridea exquisita	Sp. nov	Valid	Puckett & Colin in Puckett, Colin & Mitchell	Late Cretaceous (Maastrichtian)		Jamaica	A paracytherideid ostracod, a species of Hemiparacytheridea.	
Hispanigalathea	Gen. et 2 sp. nov	Valid	Klompmaker et al.	Cretaceous (Albian or Cenomanian)		Spain	A galatheoid. Genus contains two species: Hispanigalathea pseudolaevis and H. tuberosa.	
Huanghestheria linxiensis	Sp. nov	Valid	Niu in Zhang et al.	Late Permian	Linxi Formation	China	A vertexiine lioestheriid spinicaudatan clam shrimp, a species of Huanghestheria.	
Joeranina	Gen. et comb. et sp. nov	Valid	Van Bakel et al.	Cretaceous (Albian to early Campanian)		Canada; France; Greenland; Japan; Madagascar; Spain; Switzerland; Syria; United Kingdom; United States	A palaeocorystid crab. The type species is "Corystes" broderipii Mantell (1844). According to the authors of its description genus also contains "Palaeocorystes" harveyi Woodward (1896), "Eucorystes" japonicus Jimbô (1894), "Notopocorystes" paututensis Collins & Wienberg Rasmussen (1992), "Eucorystes" platys Schweitzer & Feldmann (2002) and "Notopocorystes" syriacus Withers (1928), as well as the new species Joeranina gaspari. On the other hand, Karasawa et al. (2014) transferred "P." harveyi, E. platys and "N." paututensis to the genus Eucorystes; the authors also transferred the species "Notopocorystes" xizangensis Wang (1981) to the genus Joeranina.	
Juracrista	Gen. et 2 sp. nov	Valid	Robins, Feldmann & Schweitzer	Late Jurassic (Tithonian)	Ernstbrunn Limestone	Austria	A munidid. The type species is Juracrista perculta; genus also contains Juracrista costaspinosa.	
Jurapylocheles iwonae	Sp. nov	Valid	Fraaije et al.	Middle Oxfordian		Poland	A pylochelid, a species of Jurapylocheles.	
Kinkelinella circumcostata	Sp. nov	Valid	Luppold	Middle Jurassic		Germany	An ostracod, a species of Kinkelinella.	
Kloedenella poschmanni	Sp. nov	Valid	Becker & Franke	Devonian		Germany	An ostracod.	
Koryncheiros	Gen. et sp. nov	Valid	Feldmann et al.	Middle or late Anisian	Guanling Formation	China	A decapod crustacean; a clytiopsid erymoid. The type species is Koryncheiros luopingensis.	
Kroemmelbeincypris	Gen. et comb. nov	Valid	Poropat & Colin	Aptian			An ostracod crustacean, a new genus for the species "Hourcqia" symmetrica Krömmelbein & Weber and "Hourcqia" angulata Krömmelbein & Weber.	
Langdaia meesooki	Sp. nov	Valid	Chitnarin in Chitnarin et al.	Late Early to Middle Permian	Tak Fa Formation	Thailand	A knoxitid palaeocopidan ostracod, a species of Langdaia.	
Leiocythereis	Gen. et sp. nov	Valid	Puckett & Colin in Puckett, Colin & Mitchell	Late Cretaceous (Maastrichtian)		Jamaica	A trachyleberidid ostracod. The type species is Leiocythereis polita.	
Lepas sattmanni	Sp. nov	Valid	Harzhauser & Schlögl	Early Miocene	Ebelsberg Formation	Austria	A lepadid barnacle, a species of Lepas.	
Lessinicarcinus	Gen. et comb. nov	Valid	De Angeli	Eocene		Croatia; Italy	A crab belonging to the family Pilumnidae. The type species is "Titanocarcinus" euglyphos Bittner (1875).	
Lessinipagurus	Gen. et sp. nov	Valid	Beschin et al.	Eocene (Lutetian)		Italy	A hermit crab. Originally assigned to the family Paguridae, subsequently transferred to the separate family Xylopaguridae by Gašparič et al. (2016). The type species is L. granulatus.	
Lienenklausicythere	Gen. et comb. nov	Valid	Uffenorde, Monostori & Tóth	Eocene to Oligocene		Europe	An ostracod, a new genus for "Hermanites" acuticosta and "Hermanites" camela; genus also contains a new, yet-unnamed species.	
Ljubimovella debilicostatus	Sp. nov	Valid	Luppold	Middle Jurassic		Germany	An ostracod, a species of Ljubimovella.	
Lobonotus beschini	Sp. nov	Valid	De Angeli & Checchi	Eocene (Lutetian)		Italy	A crab belonging to the family Tumidocarcinidae.	
Loxoconcha pindarsensis	Sp. nov	Valid	Puckett & Colin in Puckett, Colin & Mitchell	Late Cretaceous (Maastrichtian)		Jamaica	A loxoconchid ostracod, a species of Loxoconcha.	
Marylyreidus	Gen. et comb. nov	Valid	Van Bakel et al.	Cretaceous (late Albian–early Cenomanian)	Pawpaw Formation	United States	A lyreidid crab. The type species is "Notopocorystes" punctatus Rathbun (1935).	
Megokkos patagoniensis	Sp. nov	Valid	Schweitzer et al.	Eocene	Rio Turbio Formation	Argentina	A crab, a species of Megokkos.	
Mesoparapylocheles	gen et sp nov	Valid	Fraaije, Klompmaker, & Artal	Albian or Cenomanian		Spain	A hermit crab. The type species is Mesoparapylocheles michaeljacksoni.	
Microcheilinella subovata	Sp. nov	Valid	Tanaka & Maeda in Tanaka et al.	Early Permian		Japan	An ostracod, a species of Microcheilinella.	
Microcheilinella tsubogawensis	Sp. nov	Valid	Tanaka & Ichida in Tanaka et al.	Early Permian		Japan	An ostracod, a species of Microcheilinella.	
Microcoelonella takfaensis	Sp. nov	Valid	Chitnarin in Chitnarin et al.	Middle Permian	Tak Fa Formation	Thailand	A coelonellid palaeocopidan ostracod, a species of Microcoelonella.	
Microcoelonella takliensis	Sp. nov	Valid	Chitnarin in Chitnarin et al.	Middle Permian	Tak Fa Formation	Thailand	A coelonellid palaeocopidan ostracod, a species of Microcoelonella.	
Munida deangelii	Sp. nov	Valid	Robins, Feldmann & Schweitzer	Late Oligocene to early Miocene	Río Foyel Formation	Argentina	A munidid, a species of Munida.	
Myra gurii	Sp. nov	Valid	Vega et al.	Miocene (Burdigalian or Langhian)	Mishan Formation	Iran	A leucosiid decapod crustacean, a species of Myra.	
Navarradromites	Gen. et sp. nov	Valid	Klompmaker, Feldmann & Schweitzer	Cretaceous (Albian or Cenomanian)		Spain	A goniodromitid crab. The type species is Navarradromites pedroartali.	
Navarrahomola	Gen. et sp. nov.	Valid	Artal et al.	Cretaceous (Albian or Cenomanian)		Spain	A homolid crab. The type species is Navarrahomola hispanica.	
Neocallichirus bacatus	Sp. nov	Valid	Busulini, Beschin & Tessier	Eocene (Priabonian)		Italy	A member of Callianassidae.	
Neocytherideis labyrinthoidea	Sp. nov	Valid	Guernet et al.	Eocene (Lutetian)	Paris Basin	France	A neocytherideid ostracod, a species of Neocytherideis.	
Neocytheromorpha priscipacifica	Sp. nov	Valid	Yamaguchi, Mashiba & Kamiya	Miocene	Osaki Formation	Japan	An ostracod, a species of Neocytheromorpha.	
Neurocythere jakovlevae	Sp. nov	Valid	Kolpenskaya in Tesakova et al.	Late Jurassic (Early Kimmeridgian)		Russia	An ostracod, a species of Neurocythere.	
Nitotacarcinus antipodes	Sp. nov	Valid	Schweitzer et al.	Eocene	Rio Turbio Formation	Argentina	A crab, a species of Nitotacarcinus.	
Nodosculda	Gen. et sp. nov	Valid	Franţescu	Early Cretaceous (late Albian)		United States	A mantis shrimp. The type species is Nodosculda fisherorum.	
Noetlingocarcinus messinai	Sp. nov	Valid	Beschin et al.	Eocene (Lutetian)		Italy	A crab belonging to the superfamily Dromioidea and the family Basinotopidae, a species of Noetlingocarcinus.	
Nogarhomola	Gen. et sp. nov	Valid	De Angeli & Alberti	Eocene (Lutetian)		Italy	A homolid crab. The type species is Nogarhomola aurorae.	
Notopocorystes kerri	Sp. nov	Valid	Luque et al.	Early Cretaceous (late Aptian)	Paja Formation	Colombia	A palaeocorystid raninoid crab. Initially described as a species of Notopocorystes, but subsequently reassigned to the genus Joeranina.	
Nykteripteryx	Gen. et sp. nov	Valid	Klompmaker et al.	Cretaceous (Albian or Cenomanian)		Spain	A galatheoid. The type species is Nykteripteryx rostrata.	
Ochtholambrus gambillarai	Sp. nov	Valid	Busulini, Beschin & Tessier	Eocene (Priabonian)		Italy	A crab belonging to the family Parthenopidae.	
Odontodactylus italicus	Sp. nov	Valid	Beschin et al.	Eocene (Lutetian)		Italy	A mantis shrimp belonging to the family Odontodactylidae; a species of Odontodactylus.	
Ommaciria	Gen. et comb. nov	Valid	Beschin et al.	Eocene		Italy	A crab belonging to the family Majidae. The type species is "Micromaia" mainensis Beschin, Busulini, De Angeli & Tessier (1985).	
Orthobairdia jeanlouisi	Sp. nov	Valid	Forel	Early Triassic (Griesbachian)	Daye Formation	China	A bairdiid ostracod, a species of Orthobairdia.	
Ovocytheridea rotunda	Sp. nov	Valid	Puckett & Colin in Puckett, Colin & Mitchell	Late Cretaceous (Maastrichtian)		Jamaica	A cytherideid ostracod, a species of Ovocytheridea.	
Paguristes gagnaisoni	Sp. nov	Valid	Gagnaison	Miocene		France	A species of Paguristes.	
Pagurus valdagnensis	Sp. nov	Valid	Beschin et al.	Eocene (Lutetian)		Italy	A hermit crab belonging to the family Paguridae, a species of Pagurus.	
Palaega picena	Sp. nov	Valid	Pasini & Garassino	Miocene		Italy	A cirolanid isopod, a species of Palaega.	
Palaega pisana	Sp. nov	Junior synonym	Pasini & Garassino	Pliocene		Italy	A cirolanid isopod. Originally described as a species of Palaega; considered to be a junior synonym of Bathynomus sismondai (Ristori, 1891) by Hyžný, Pasini & Garassino (2019).	
Palaega steatopigia	Sp. nov	Nomen dubium	Pasini & Garassino	Pliocene		Italy	A cirolanid isopod. Originally described as a species of Palaega; Hyžný, Pasini & Garassino (2019) considered this species to be a nomen dubium and reassigned it to the genus Bathynomus.	
Palaeohomarus pacificus	Sp. nov	Valid	Aguirre-Urreta, Lazo & Rawson	Late Hauterivian or early Barremian	Agrio Formation	Argentina	A decapod crustacean, a species of Palaeohomarus.	
Paracypris keiji	Sp. nov	Valid	Guernet et al.	Eocene (Lutetian)	Paris Basin	France	A candonid ostracod, a species of Paracypris.	
Paranecrocarcinus balla	Sp. nov	Valid	Van Bakel et al.	Late Cretaceous (Cenomanian)		France	A necrocarcinid crab, a species of Paranecrocarcinus.	
Periosocypris	Gen. et sp. nov	Valid	Whatley, Khosla & Rathore	Late Cretaceous (Maastrichtian)	Lameta Formation	India	A cypridid ostracod. The type species is Periosocypris megistus.	
Petrochirus savii	Sp. nov	Valid	Beschin et al.	Eocene (Lutetian)		Italy	A hermit crab belonging to the family Diogenidae, a species of Petrochirus.	
Phrixocythere	Gen. et sp. nov	Valid	Puckett & Colin in Puckett, Colin & Mitchell	Late Cretaceous (Maastrichtian)		Jamaica	A hemicytherid ostracod. The type species is Phrixocythere unionensis.	
Planocarcinus	Gen. et comb. nov	Valid	Luque et al.	Early Cretaceous (late Aptian)	Paja Formation	Colombia	A necrocarcinid raninoid crab, a new genus for "Dakoticancer" olssoni Rathbun (1937).	
Podocallichirus laepaensis	Sp. nov	Valid	Hyžný & Muñiz	Late Miocene		Spain	A callianassid ghost shrimp. Originally described as a species of Podocallichirus; subsequently transferred to the genus Balsscallichirus by Hyžný (2016).	
Protobuntonia warorei	Sp. nov	Valid	Sarr	Paleocene to Ypresian		Senegal; Togo	A trachyleberidid ostracod, a species of Buntonia.	
Pterygocythereis babinoti	Sp. nov	Valid	Puckett & Colin in Puckett, Colin & Mitchell	Late Cretaceous (Maastrichtian)		Jamaica	A trachyleberidid ostracod, a species of Pterygocythereis.	
Pylochelitergites	Gen. et 2 sp. nov	Valid	Fraaije et al.	Oxfordian to Kimmeridgian		Germany; Poland	A pylochelid hermit crab. Genus contains two species: P. westerbergensis (the type species) and P. gelasinus.	
Quasilaeviranina minuscula	Sp. nov	Valid	Beschin et al.	Eocene (Lutetian)		Italy	A crab belonging to the family Raninidae, a species of Quasilaeviranina.	
Raninoides rioturbiensis	Sp. nov	Valid	Schweitzer et al.	Eocene	Rio Turbio Formation	Argentina	A crab, a species of Raninoides.	
Rhinolambrus elongatus	Sp. nov	Valid	Beschin et al.	Eocene (Lutetian)		Italy	A crab belonging to the family Parthenopidae; a species of Rhinolambrus.	
Ristoria	Gen. et comb. nov	Valid	Garassino, Pasini, De Angeli & Charbonnier in Garassino et al.	Early Pliocene		Italy	A leucosiid crab, a new genus for "Ilia" pliocaenica Ristori, 1891.	
Samarella sonei	Sp. nov	Valid	Chitnarin in Chitnarin et al.	Middle Permian	Tak Fa Formation	Thailand	A paraparchitid palaeocopidan ostracod, a species of Samarella.	
Samarella viscusforma	Sp. nov	Valid	Chitnarin in Chitnarin et al.	Early to Middle Permian	Pha Nok Khao Formation; Tak Fa Formation	Thailand	A paraparchitid palaeocopidan ostracod, a species of Samarella.	
Sargentina chantarameei	Sp. nov	Valid	Chitnarin in Chitnarin et al.	Early to Middle Permian	Pha Nok Khao Formation; Tak Fa Formation	Thailand	A knoxitid palaeocopidan ostracod, a species of Sargentina.	
Scalpellum paratethyianum	Sp. nov	Valid	Harzhauser & Schlögl	Early Miocene	Lakšárska Nová Ves Formation	Slovakia	A scalpellid barnacle, a species of Scalpellum.	
Schizoptocythere nana	Sp. nov	Valid	Puckett & Colin in Puckett, Colin & Mitchell	Late Cretaceous (Maastrichtian)		Jamaica	A trachyleberidid ostracod, a species of Schizoptocythere.	
Schizoptocythere pinna	Sp. nov	Valid	Puckett & Colin in Puckett, Colin & Mitchell	Late Cretaceous (Maastrichtian)		Jamaica	A trachyleberidid ostracod, a species of Schizoptocythere.	
Schuleridea exigua	Sp. nov	Valid	Puckett & Colin in Puckett, Colin & Mitchell	Late Cretaceous (Maastrichtian)		Jamaica	A cytherideid ostracod, a species of Schuleridea.	
Semicytherura carioui	Sp. nov	Valid	Sarr	Ypresian to Lutetian		Senegal	A cytherurid ostracod, a species of Semicytherura.	
Sineruga	gen et sp nov	Valid	Perrier	Silurian (uppermost Ludlow to lower Pridoli)	Le Val Formation	France	myodocope ostracod. type species is Sineruga insolita.	
Southcavea (Saxosouthcavea)	Subgen. et 3 sp. nov	Valid	Luppold	Middle Jurassic		Germany	An ostracod, a subgenus of Southcavea containing three new species: Southcavea (Saxosouthcavea) extendata, Southcavea (Saxosouthcavea) bartenbrandi and Southcavea (Saxosouthcavea) malzi (with two subspecies: S. (S.) malzi malzi and S. (S.) malzi reticulata).	
Spinicytheridea	Gen. et sp. nov	Valid	Puckett & Colin in Puckett, Colin & Mitchell	Late Cretaceous (Maastrichtian)		Jamaica; Mexico	A cytherideid ostracod. The type species is Spinicytheridea compta from Jamaica; genus also includes a second, unnamed species from the Maastrichtian Ocozocoautla Formation of Chiapas, Mexico.	
Spinirostrimaia	Gen. et comb. nov	Valid	Beschin et al.	Eocene		Italy; Spain	A crab belonging to the family Majidae. The type species is "Micromaia" margaritata Fabiani (1910).	
Stagmacaris adielklompmakeri	Sp. nov	Valid	Fraaije et al.	Early late Kimmeridgian		Germany	A pylochelid hermit crab, a species of Stagmacaris.	
Stagmacaris biarcus	Sp. nov	Valid	Fraaije et al.	Middle Oxfordian		Poland	A pylochelid hermit crab, a species of Stagmacaris.	
Steorrosia	gen et comb nov	Valid	Schweitzer et al.	Late Albian to Cenomanian		United States	Crab, New genus for "Xanthosia" aspera. Other species S. pawpawensis and S. reidi.	
Styracocarcinus	Gen. et comb. nov	Valid	Schweitzer & Feldmann	Late Cretaceous (Senonian)		Morocco	A tumidocarcinid decapod, a new genus for "Titanocarcinus" meridionalis Secretan, 1961.	
Superpendicythere	Gen. et sp. nov	Valid	Luppold	Middle Jurassic		Germany	An ostracod. The type species is S. binodosa.	
Symethoides	Gen. et sp. nov	Valid	Van Bakel et al.	Paleocene (early Danian)	Tinton Formation	United States	A raninid crab. The type species is Symethoides monmouthorum.	
Szaboa deppermanni	Sp. nov	Valid	Fraaije et al.	Oligocene	Ratzeburg Formation	Germany	A matutid crab, a species of Szaboa.	
Thalamita italica	Sp. nov	Valid	Garassino, Pasini, De Angeli & Charbonnier in Garassino et al.	Early Pliocene		Italy	A portunid crab, a species of Thalamita.	
Tridactylastacus	Gen. et sp. nov	Valid	Feldmann et al.	Middle or late Anisian	Guanling Formation	China	A decapod crustacean; a glypheoid belonging to the family Litogastridae. The type species is Tridactylastacus sinensis.	
Turbiocheir	Gen. et sp. nov	Disputed	Schweitzer et al.	Eocene	Rio Turbio Formation	Argentina; Chile; Venezuela	A thalassinidean. The type species is Turbiocheir minutospinata. Hyžný et al. (2020) considered the genus Turbiocheir to be a junior synonym of the genus Anacalliax, creating a new combination Anacalliax minutospinata.	
Vecticallichirus	Gen. et sp. nov	Valid	Quayle & Collins	Late Eocene and Oligocene	Headon Beds	United Kingdom	A callichirid ghost shrimp. The type species is Vecticallichirus abditus. Hyžný (2020) considered V. abditus to be a junior synonym of "Callianassa" batei Woodward (1869), resulting in a new combination Vecticallichirus batei.	
Vegaranina	Gen. et comb. nov	Valid	Van Bakel et al.	Late Cretaceous (Campanian–Maastrichtian)		Cuba; France; Mexico; United States (Puerto Rico)	A raninid crab. The type species is "Lophoranina" precocious Feldmann, Vega, Tucker, García-Barrera & Avendaño (1996).	
Vernoniella tenuipora	Sp. nov	Valid	Luppold	Middle Jurassic		Germany	An ostracod, a species of Vernoniella.	
Viaia	Gen. et sp. nov.	Valid	Artal et al.	Cretaceous (Albian or Cenomanian)		Spain	A viaiid glaessneropsoid crab. The type species is Viaia robusta.	
Yunnanopalinura	Gen. et sp. nov	Valid	Feldmann et al.	Middle or late Anisian	Guanling Formation	China	A decapod crustacean; a spiny lobster. The type species is Yunnanopalinura schrami.	

== Eurypterids ==
Name	Novelty	Status	Authors	Age	Unit	Location	Notes	Images
Adelophthalmus dubius	Sp. nov	Valid	Shpinev	Middle Devonian		Russia	A eurypterid, a species of Adelophthalmus.	
Adelophthalmus kamyshtensis	Sp. nov	Valid	Shpinev	Middle Devonian		Russia	A eurypterid, a species of Adelophthalmus.	
Drepanopterus odontospathus	Sp. nov	Valid	Lamsdell	Early Devonian		Canada	A eurypterid.	
Nanahughmilleria notosibirica	Sp. nov	Valid	Shpinev	Devonian		Russia	A eurypterid, a species of Nanahughmilleria.	
Parahughmilleria longa	Sp. nov	Valid	Shpinev	Devonian		Russia	A eurypterid, a species of Parahughmilleria.	
Stylonuroides orientalis	Sp. nov	Valid	Shpinev	Devonian		Russia	A eurypterid, a species of Stylonuroides.	

== Trilobites ==
Name	Novelty	Status	Authors	Age	Unit	Location	Notes	Images
Abanomocarella	Gen. et sp. et comb. nov	Valid	Yuan et al.	Cambrian	Changhia Formation	China	A member of Ptychopariida belonging to the family Anomocarellidae. Genus includes new species A. quadrata, as well as A. humilis (Resser & Endo in Endo & Resser, 1937) and A. pyriformis (Resser & Endo in Endo & Resser, 1937).	
Acmarhachis kindlei	Sp nov	Valid	Westrop & Eoff	Late Cambrian	Cow Head Group	Canada	An agnostid, a species of Acmarhachis.	
Acmarhachis whittingtoni	Sp nov	Valid	Westrop & Eoff	Late Cambrian	Cow Head Group	Canada	An agnostid, a species of Acmarhachis.	
Angsiduoa jiulongshanensis	Sp. nov	Valid	Yuan et al.	Cambrian	Changhia Formation	China	A member of Ptychopariida belonging to the family Ignotogregatidae.	
Angsiduoa shanxiensis	Sp. nov	Valid	Yuan et al.	Cambrian	Changhia Formation	China	A member of Ptychopariida belonging to the family Ignotogregatidae.	
Angsiduoa transversa	Sp. nov	Valid	Yuan et al.	Cambrian	Changhia Formation	China	A member of Ptychopariida belonging to the family Ignotogregatidae.	
Anomocarella? antiqua	Sp. nov	Valid	Yuan et al.	Cambrian	Changhia Formation	China	A member of Ptychopariida belonging to the family Anomocarellidae.	
Anomocarella jiulongshanensis	Sp. nov	Valid	Yuan et al.	Cambrian	Changhia Formation	China	A member of Ptychopariida belonging to the family Anomocarellidae.	
Anomocarella similis	Sp. nov	Valid	Yuan et al.	Cambrian	Changhia Formation	China	A member of Ptychopariida belonging to the family Anomocarellidae.	
Aponileus aasei	Sp nov	Valid	Adrain & McAdams	Early Ordovician (late Floian)	Fillmore Formation	United States	A bathyurid trilobite, a species of Aponileus.	
Aponileus belkaae	Sp nov	Valid	Adrain & McAdams	Early Ordovician (late Floian)	Wah Wah Formation	United States	A bathyurid trilobite, a species of Aponileus.	
Aponileus laikaae	Sp nov	Valid	Adrain & McAdams	Early Ordovician (late Floian)	Fillmore Formation	United States	A bathyurid trilobite, a species of Aponileus.	
Aponileus strelkaae	Sp nov	Valid	Adrain & McAdams	Early Ordovician (late Floian)	Wah Wah Formation	United States	A bathyurid trilobite, a species of Aponileus.	
Aponileus ugolekae	Sp nov	Valid	Adrain & McAdams	Early Ordovician (late Floian)	Wah Wah Formation	United States	A bathyurid trilobite, a species of Aponileus.	
Aponileus? veterokae	Sp nov	Valid	Adrain & McAdams	Early Ordovician (late Floian)	Wah Wah Formation	United States	A bathyurid trilobite, a possible species of Aponileus.	
Archaeagnostus typicus	Sp. nov	Valid	Yuan et al.	Cambrian	Changhia Formation	China	A member of the family Peronopsidae.	
Archegonus (Phillibole) nehdenensis africanus	Subsp. nov	Valid	Hahn, Müller & Becker	Carboniferous (Mississippian)		Morocco	A member of Phillipsiidae belonging to the subfamily Archegoninae, a subspecies of Archegonus nehdenensis.	
Asaphellus cuervoae	Sp. nov	Disputed	Corbacho & López-Soriano	Ordovician (Floian)	Upper Fezouata Formation	Morocco	A member of Asaphidae, a species of Asaphellus. Gutiérrez-Marco et al. (2017) considered this species to be likely based on poorly preserved and probably retouched specimens of Asaphellus stubbsi.	
Astycoryphe arduinnae	Sp nov	Valid	Van Viersen, van Rossum & Prescher	Middle Devonian		Belgium	A member of Proetida.	
Australoscutellum iota	sp nov	Valid	Holloway and Lane	Silurian		Australia	A scutelluid trilobite, a species of Australoscutellum.	
Australoscutellum microps	sp nov	Valid	Holloway and Lane	Silurian		Australia	A scutelluid trilobite, a species of Australoscutellum.	
Australoscutellum pulex	sp nov	Valid	Holloway and Lane	Silurian		Australia	A scutelluid trilobite, a species of Australoscutellum.	
Australoscutellum trica	sp nov	Valid	Holloway and Lane	Silurian		Australia	A scutelluid trilobite, a species of Australoscutellum.	
Baltagnostus yaojiayuensis	Sp. nov	Valid	Yuan et al.	Cambrian	Changhia Formation	China	A member of the family Diplagnostidae.	
Baojingia (Eobaojingia)	Subgen. et 2 sp. nov	Valid	Yuan et al.	Cambrian	Changhia Formation	China	A member of the family Lisaniidae. The subgenus includes Baojingia (Eobaojingia) dubia and Baojingia (Eobaojingia) ezhuangensis, as well as Baojingia miaogouensis Mong in Zhou et al. (1977).	
Borenoria	gen et sp nov	Valid	Holloway and Lane	Silurian		Australia	A scutelluid trilobite. The type species is Borenoria cirrita.	
Bumastoides graffhami	Sp nov	Valid	Carlucci et al.	Ordovician		United States	An illaenid trilobite, a species of Bumastoides.	
Bumastoides kimmswickensis	Sp nov	Valid	Carlucci et al.	Ordovician		United States	An illaenid trilobite, a species of Bumastoides.	
Bumastoides moundensis	Sp nov	Valid	Carlucci et al.	Ordovician		United States	An illaenid trilobite, a species of Bumastoides.	
Calymene harringtoni	Sp. nov	Valid	Tortello in Tortello et al.	Early Silurian	Vargas Peña Formation	Paraguay	A species of Calymene.	
Chlupacula (Chlupacula) erfoudensis	Sp. nov	Valid	Hahn, Müller & Becker	Carboniferous (Mississippian)		Morocco	A member of Phillipsiidae belonging to the subfamily Archegoninae, a species of Chlupacula.	
Crepicephalina exsculpta	Sp. nov	Valid	Yuan et al.	Cambrian	Changhia Formation	China		
Crepicephalina obscura	Sp. nov	Valid	Yuan et al.	Cambrian	Changhia Formation	China		
Crepicephalina pulchra	Sp. nov	Valid	Yuan et al.	Cambrian	Changhia Formation	China		
Crepicephalina? rara	Sp. nov	Valid	Yuan et al.	Cambrian	Changhia Formation	China		
Crepicephalina woqishanensis	Sp. nov	Valid	Yuan et al.	Cambrian	Changhia Formation	China		
Cummingella boikoi	sp nov	Valid	Mychko	Sakmarian		Russia	A phillipsiid, a species of Cummingella.	
Cyrtoproetus (Crassibole) acrops	Sp. nov	Valid	Hahn, Müller & Becker	Carboniferous (Mississippian)		Morocco	A member of Phillipsiidae belonging to the subfamily Archegoninae, a species of Cyrtoproetus.	
Dalejeproetus owensi	Sp nov	Valid	Johnson & Fortey	Early Devonian (Pragian)	Ihandar Formation	Morocco	A proetid trilobite, a species of Dalejeproetus.	
Dalejeproetus sagaouii	Sp nov	Valid	Johnson & Fortey	Early Devonian (Pragian)	Ihandar Formation	Morocco	A proetid trilobite, a species of Dalejeproetus.	
Dameselloides	Gen. et sp. nov	Valid	Yuan et al.	Cambrian	Changhia Formation	China	A member of the family Damesellidae. Genus includes new species D. sinensis.	
Danjiangella shandongensis	Sp. nov	Valid	Yuan et al.	Cambrian	Changhia Formation	China		
Dechenelloides tazoultensis	Sp. nov	Valid	Hahn, Müller & Becker	Carboniferous (Mississippian)		Morocco	A member of Phillipsiidae belonging to the subfamily Archegoninae, a species of Dechenelloides.	
Decoroscutellum planes	sp nov	Valid	Holloway and Lane	Silurian		Australia	A scutelluid trilobite, a species of Decoroscutellum.	
Derikaspis conicus	Sp. nov	Valid	Yuan et al.	Cambrian	Changhia Formation	China		
Derikaspis ruichengensis	Sp. nov	Valid	Yuan et al.	Cambrian	Changhia Formation	China		
Diacoryphe (Archaeocoryphe) maiderensis	Sp. nov	Valid	Hahn, Müller & Becker	Carboniferous (Mississippian)		Morocco	A member of Phillipsiidae belonging to the subfamily Archegoninae, a species of Diacoryphe.	
Dindymene whittingtoni	Sp nov	Valid	Owen & Bruton	Late Ordovician		United States	A species of Dindymene.	
Dorypyge cylindrica	Sp. nov	Valid	Yuan et al.	Cambrian	Changhia Formation	China		
Dorypyge zhangxianensis	Sp. nov	Valid	Yuan et al.	Cambrian	Changhia Formation	China		
Dunopyge seiberti	Sp. nov	Valid	Basse & Müller	Early Devonian	Seifen Beds	Germany	A member of Acastidae belonging to the subfamily Asteropyginae, a species of Dunopyge.	
Eilura trapezialis	Sp. nov	Valid	Yuan et al.	Cambrian	Changhia Formation	China		
Elaphraella? taebaeksanensis	Sp. nov	Valid	Park & Choi	Cambrian (middle Furongian)	Sesong Formation	South Korea	A member of the family Shumardiidae.	
Emmrichella punctata	Sp. nov	Valid	Yuan et al.	Cambrian	Changhia Formation	China	A member of the family Ptychopariidae.	
Eokoldinia	Gen. et sp. nov	Valid	Yuan et al.	Cambrian	Changhia Formation	China	A member of the family Plethopeltidae. Genus includes new species E. porifera.	
Eomapania	Gen. et sp. nov	Valid	Yuan et al.	Cambrian	Changhia Formation	China	A member of the family Mapaniidae. Genus includes new species E. subquadrata.	
Eoscutellum annosum	sp nov	Valid	Holloway and Lane	Silurian		Australia	A scutelluid trilobite, a species of Eoscutellum.	
Eymekops pristina	Sp. nov	Valid	Yuan et al.	Cambrian	Changhia Formation	China		
Eymekops transversa	Sp. nov	Valid	Yuan et al.	Cambrian	Changhia Formation	China		
Grandioculus macroculus	Sp. nov	Valid	Yuan et al.	Cambrian	Changhia Formation	China		
Grandioculus (Protohedinia) quadraticephala	Sp. nov	Valid	Yuan et al.	Cambrian	Changhia Formation	China		
Gumunsoia	Gen. et sp. nov	Valid	Park, Sohn & Choi	Cambrian (middle Furongian)	Sesong Formation	South Korea	A member of Leiostegioidea belonging to the family Kaolishaniidae. Genus includes new species G. triangularis.	
Gushanella	Gen. et 2 sp. nov	Valid	Yuan et al.	Cambrian	Changhia Formation	China	A member of the family Solenopleuridae. Genus includes new species G. quadrata and G. truncata.	
Heyelingella crassa	Sp. nov	Valid	Yuan et al.	Cambrian	Changhia Formation	China		
Honania porifera	Sp. nov	Valid	Yuan et al.	Cambrian	Changhia Formation	China		
Huayuanaspis angustilimbata	Sp. nov	Valid	Yuan et al.	Cambrian	Changhia Formation	China		
Idioura brevispina	Sp. nov	Valid	Yuan et al.	Cambrian	Changhia Formation	China		
Illaenoscutellum tryo	sp nov	Valid	Holloway and Lane	Silurian		Australia	A scutelluid trilobite, a species of Illaenoscutellum.	
Inouyella rara	Sp. nov	Valid	Yuan et al.	Cambrian	Changhia Formation	China		
Inouyella shiliuyuanensis	Sp. nov	Valid	Yuan et al.	Cambrian	Changhia Formation	China		
Inouyia (Bulbinouyia)	Subgen. nov	Valid	Yuan et al.	Cambrian	Changhia Formation	China	A member of the family Inouyiidae. The subgenus includes Inouyia kangzhuangensis (Zhang & Wang, 1985) and I. lubrica (Zhou in Zhou et al., 1982).	
Inouyia latilimbata	Sp. nov	Valid	Yuan et al.	Cambrian	Changhia Formation	China		
Iranoleesia pustulosa	Sp. nov	Valid	Yuan et al.	Cambrian	Changhia Formation	China		
Iranoleesia (Proasaphiscina) rogosa	Sp. nov	Valid	Yuan et al.	Cambrian	Changhia Formation	China		
Japonoscutellum borenorense	sp nov	Valid	Holloway and Lane	Silurian		Australia	A scutelluid trilobite, a species of Japonoscutellum.	
Japonoscutellum crassum	sp nov	Valid	Holloway and Lane	Silurian		Australia	A scutelluid trilobite, a species of Japonoscutellum.	
Japonoscutellum diascetum	sp nov	Valid	Holloway and Lane	Silurian		Australia	A scutelluid trilobite, a species of Japonoscutellum.	
Japonoscutellum gephyricum	sp nov	Valid	Holloway and Lane	Silurian		Australia	A scutelluid trilobite, a species of Japonoscutellum.	
Japonoscutellum guttulatum	sp nov	Valid	Holloway and Lane	Silurian		Australia	A scutelluid trilobite, a species of Japonoscutellum.	
Japonoscutellum serangicum	sp nov	Valid	Holloway and Lane	Silurian		Australia	A scutelluid trilobite, a species of Japonoscutellum.	
Japonoscutellum strabo	sp nov	Valid	Holloway and Lane	Silurian		Australia	A scutelluid trilobite, a species of Japonoscutellum.	
Jiulongshania shandongensis	Sp. nov	Valid	Yuan et al.	Cambrian	Changhia Formation	China	A member of the family Diceratocephalidae.	
Koptura (Eokoptura)	Subgen. et sp. nov	Valid	Yuan et al.	Cambrian	Changhia Formation	China	A member of the family Anomocaridae. The subgenus includes new species Koptura (Eokoptura) bella, as well as Koptura quadrata (Resser & Endo in Endo & Resser, 1937).	
Koptura intermedia	Sp. nov	Valid	Yuan et al.	Cambrian	Changhia Formation	China	A member of the family Anomocaridae.	
Kosovopeltis trepida	sp nov	Valid	Holloway and Lane	Silurian		Australia	A scutelluid trilobite, a species of Kosovopeltis.	
Kosovopeltis xynon	sp nov	Valid	Holloway and Lane	Silurian		Australia	A scutelluid trilobite, a species of Kosovopeltis.	
Lepidoproetus lahceni	Sp nov	Valid	Johnson & Fortey	Early Devonian (Pragian)	Ihandar Formation	Morocco	A proetid trilobite, a species of Lepidoproetus.	
Lepidoproetus maharchianus	Sp nov	Valid	Johnson & Fortey	Early Devonian (Pragian)	Ihandar Formation	Morocco	A proetid trilobite, a species of Lepidoproetus.	
Lepidoproetus splendens	Sp nov	Valid	Johnson & Fortey	Early Devonian (Pragian)	Ihandar Formation	Morocco	A proetid trilobite, a species of Lepidoproetus.	
Liowutaishania laevigata	Sp. nov	Valid	Yuan et al.	Cambrian	Changhia Formation	China		
Lisania elliptica	Sp. nov	Valid	Yuan et al.	Cambrian	Changhia Formation	China		
Longiproetus meiopsifius	Sp nov	Valid	Van Viersen, van Rossum & Prescher	Middle Devonian		Belgium	A member of Proetida.	
Lunania	Gen. nov	Junior homonym	Yuan et al.	Cambrian	Changhia Formation	China	A member of the family Menocephalidae. The generic name is preoccupied by Lunania Chow (1957).	
Maotunia transversa	Sp. nov	Valid	Yuan et al.	Cambrian	Changhia Formation	China		
Mapania (Mapanella)	Subgen. et 2 sp. nov	Valid	Yuan et al.	Cambrian	Changhia Formation	China	A member of the family Mapaniidae. The subgenus includes new species M. (Mapanella) transversa and M. (Mapanella) prisca, as well as Mapania blackwelderi (Resser & Endo in Endo & Resser, 1937).	
Mapania subcylindrica	Sp. nov	Valid	Yuan et al.	Cambrian	Changhia Formation	China		
Mapanopsis conicus	Sp. nov	Valid	Yuan et al.	Cambrian	Changhia Formation	China		
Maurotarion megacephalum	Sp. nov.	Valid	Rustán & Vaccari	Early Devonian (Pragian)	Talacasto Formation	Argentina	An otarionine aulacopleurid, a species of Maurotarion.	
Megagraulos similis	Sp. nov	Valid	Yuan et al.	Cambrian	Changhia Formation	China		
Menocephalina	Gen. et sp. nov	Valid	Yuan et al.	Cambrian	Changhia Formation	China	A member of the family Menocephalidae. Genus includes new species M. longispinosa.	
Menocephalites (Hutoushania)	Subgen. et 2 sp. nov	Valid	Yuan et al.	Cambrian	Changhia Formation	China	A member of the family Menocephalidae. The subgenus includes Menocephalites (Hutoushania) triangulata and M. (Hutoushania) zaozhuangansis.	
Menocephalites porosus	Sp. nov	Valid	Yuan et al.	Cambrian	Changhia Formation	China		
Menocephalites primitivus	Sp. nov	Valid	Yuan et al.	Cambrian	Changhia Formation	China		
Menocephalites simplex	Sp. nov	Valid	Yuan et al.	Cambrian	Changhia Formation	China		
Metanomocarella primitiva	Sp. nov	Valid	Yuan et al.	Cambrian	Changhia Formation	China		
Micagnostus semicircularis	Sp. nov	Valid	Yuan et al.	Cambrian	Changhia Formation	China		
Mirrabooka	gen et sp nov	Valid	Holloway and Lane	Silurian		Australia	A scutelluid trilobite. The type species is Mirrabooka harryi.	
Monkaspis conica	Sp. nov	Valid	Yuan et al.	Cambrian	Changhia Formation	China		
Ohleum magreani	Sp nov	Valid	Taghon, Bonino & Mottequin	Devonian (Eifelian)	Jemelle Formation	Belgium	A member of Lichida belonging to the family Lichidae.	
Pagetides qianensis	Sp nov	Valid	Zhang & Clarkson	Cambrian		China	An eodiscoid trilobite, a species of Pagetides.	
Paleonelsonia granulosa	Sp. nov	Valid	Yuan et al.	Cambrian	Changhia Formation	China	A member of the family Ptychopariidae.	
Paleonelsonia sulcata	Sp. nov	Valid	Yuan et al.	Cambrian	Changhia Formation	China	A member of the family Ptychopariidae.	
Paracoosia langgongsiensis	Sp. nov	Valid	Yuan et al.	Cambrian	Changhia Formation	China	A member of the family Anomocaridae.	
Paralevisia subglobosa	Sp. nov	Valid	Yuan et al.	Cambrian	Changhia Formation	China		
Parayujinia pulchra	Sp. nov	Valid	Yuan et al.	Cambrian	Changhia Formation	China		
Peishania abnormis	Sp. nov	Valid	Yuan et al.	Cambrian	Changhia Formation	China		
Peishania obscura	Sp. nov	Valid	Yuan et al.	Cambrian	Changhia Formation	China		
Peronopsis jiulongshanensis	Sp. nov	Valid	Yuan et al.	Cambrian	Changhia Formation	China		
Peronopsis universalis	Sp. nov	Valid	Yuan et al.	Cambrian	Changhia Formation	China		
Persia	Gen. et sp. nov	Junior homonym	Lerosey-Aubril	Carboniferous (Tournaisian)		Iran	The type species is Persia praecox. The generic name is preoccupied by Persia Repin (1996); Lerosey-Aubril & Deshmukh (2022) coined a replacement name Persiax.	Persiax praecox
Pilletina seifenensis	Sp. nov	Valid	Basse & Müller	Early Devonian	Seifen Beds	Germany	A member of Acastidae belonging to the subfamily Asteropyginae, a species of Pilletina.	
Pingluia granulosa	Sp. nov	Valid	Yuan et al.	Cambrian	Changhia Formation	China		
Plectrocrania elegans	Sp. nov	Valid	Yuan et al.	Cambrian	Changhia Formation	China		
Plectrocrania intermedia	Sp. nov	Valid	Yuan et al.	Cambrian	Changhia Formation	China		
Plesigangderria latilimbata	Sp. nov	Valid	Yuan et al.	Cambrian	Changhia Formation	China		
Podoliproetus mirdani	Sp nov	Valid	Johnson & Fortey	Early Devonian (Pragian)	Ihandar Formation	Morocco	A proetid trilobite, a species of Podoliproetus.	
Podoliproetus sinespina	Sp nov	Valid	Johnson & Fortey	Early Devonian (Pragian)	Ihandar Formation	Morocco	A proetid trilobite, a species of Podoliproetus.	
Praeymekops	Gen. et sp. et comb. nov	Valid	Yuan et al.	Cambrian	Changhia Formation	China	A member of the family Proasaphiscidae. Genus includes new species P. minutus, as well as P. sinensis (Mansuy, 1916).	
Proasaphiscus laiwuensis	Sp. nov	Valid	Yuan et al.	Cambrian	Changhia Formation	China		
Proetina ihamadii	Sp nov	Valid	Johnson & Fortey	Early Devonian (Pragian)	Ihandar Formation	Morocco	A proetid trilobite, a species of Proetina.	
Pseudoolenoides fossilmountainensis	Sp nov	Valid	Adrain, McAdams & Karim	Middle Ordovician	Kanosh Formation	United States	A bathyurid, a species of Pseudoolenoides.	
Pseudoolenoides oilcreekensis	Sp nov	Valid	Adrain, McAdams & Karim	Middle Ordovician	Oil Creek Formation	United States	A bathyurid, a species of Pseudoolenoides.	
Pseudoolenoides pogonipensis	Sp nov	Valid	Adrain, McAdams & Karim	Middle Ordovician	Kanosh Formation	United States	A bathyurid, a species of Pseudoolenoides.	
Pseudopeishania	Gen. et 3 sp. et comb. nov	Valid	Yuan et al.	Cambrian	Changhia Formation	China	A member of Ptychopariida belonging to the family Anomocarellidae. Genus includes new species P. brevis, P. similis and P. woqishanensis, as well as P. angustata (Endo, 1944).	
Pseudoperonopsis elegans	Sp. nov	Valid	Yuan et al.	Cambrian	Changhia Formation	China		
Pseudophillipsia parvizii	Sp. nov	Valid	Lerosey-Aubril	Permian		Iran	A species of Pseudophillipsia sensu lato.	
Pseudotaitzuia angustilimbata	Sp. nov	Valid	Yuan et al.	Cambrian	Changhia Formation	China	A member of Asaphida belonging to the family Ordosiidae.	
Pseudotaitzuia rara	Sp. nov	Valid	Yuan et al.	Cambrian	Changhia Formation	China	A member of Asaphida belonging to the family Ordosiidae.	
Pudoproetus zhorae	Sp. nov	Valid	Hahn, Müller & Becker	Carboniferous (Mississippian)		Morocco	A member of Proetidae, a species of Pudoproetus.	
Raragnostus intermedius	Sp. nov	Valid	Yuan et al.	Cambrian	Changhia Formation	China		
Raymondaspis grandigena	sp nov	Valid	Stein & Bergström	Middle Ordovician		Sweden	A styginid, a species of Raymondaspis.	
Reediella mitchelli tafilaltensis	Subsp. nov	Valid	Hahn, Müller & Becker	Carboniferous (Mississippian)		Morocco	A member of Phillipsiidae belonging to the subfamily Bollandiinae, a subspecies of Reediella mitchelli.	
Ruichengocephalus	Gen. et sp. nov	Valid	Yuan et al.	Cambrian	Changhia Formation	China	A member of the family Ptychopariidae. Genus includes new species R. typicus.	
Saimachia yichangensis	Sp. nov	Valid	Yuan et al.	Cambrian	Changhia Formation	China		
Schopfaspis? graciai	sp nov	Valid	Esteve et al..	Middle Cambrian		Spain	An alokistocarid, possibly a species of Schopfaspis.	
Sdzuyella conica	Sp. nov	Valid	Yuan et al.	Cambrian	Changhia Formation	China	A member of Ptychopariida belonging to the family Holocephalidae.	
Securifrons	gen et comb nov	Valid	Holloway and Lane	Ordovician to Silurian			Scutelluid trilobite. species- S. borealis, S. cunctatum, S. major and ?S. umbonatus.	
Shiliuyuania	Gen. et 2 sp. nov	Valid	Yuan et al.	Cambrian	Changhia Formation	China	A member of the family Crepicephalidae. Genus includes new species S. cylindrica and S. quadrata.	
Solenoparia zhangxianensis	Sp. nov	Valid	Yuan et al.	Cambrian	Changhia Formation	China		
Solenoparina bella	Sp. nov	Valid	Yuan et al.	Cambrian	Changhia Formation	China		
Sphaerophthalmus arcus	Sp nov	Valid	Høyberget & Bruton	Cambrian (Furongian)	Alum Shale Formation	Norway	A member of the family Olenidae.	
Spiniscabrella albertii	Sp. nov	Valid	Müller & Franke	Devonian		Germany	A member of the family Homalonotidae.	
Sudanomocarina elliptica	Sp. nov	Valid	Yuan et al.	Cambrian	Changhia Formation	China		
Sudanomocarina hutoushanensis	Sp. nov	Valid	Yuan et al.	Cambrian	Changhia Formation	China		
Symphysops stevaninae	Sp. nov	Valid	López-Soriano & Corbacho	Late Ordovician	Lower Ktaoua Formation	Morocco	A member of Cyclopygidae, a species of Symphysops.	
Szeaspis (Pseudoszeaspis)	Subgen. et sp. nov	Valid	Yuan et al.	Cambrian	Changhia Formation	China	A member of Ptychopariida belonging to the family Anomocarellidae. The subgenus includes new species Szeaspis (Pseudoszeaspis) conicus, as well as Szeaspis huananensis Peng, Babcock & Lin (2004) and Szeaspis pustulosa (Resser & Endo in Endo & Resser, 1937).	
Szeaspis crassus	Sp. nov	Valid	Yuan et al.	Cambrian	Changhia Formation	China	A member of Ptychopariida belonging to the family Anomocarellidae.	
Taitzehoia huolianzhaiensis	Sp. nov	Valid	Yuan et al.	Cambrian	Changhia Formation	China	A member of the family Damesellidae.	
Teinistion jiulongshanense	Sp. nov	Valid	Yuan et al.	Cambrian	Changhia Formation	China	A member of the family Damesellidae.	
Teinistion quadratum	Sp. nov	Valid	Yuan et al.	Cambrian	Changhia Formation	China	A member of the family Damesellidae.	
Teinistion yangjiazhuangense	Sp. nov	Valid	Yuan et al.	Cambrian	Changhia Formation	China	A member of the family Damesellidae.	
Tomagnostus (Paratomagnostus)	Subgen. et sp. nov	Valid	Yuan et al.	Cambrian	Changhia Formation	China	A member of the family Ptychagnostidae. The subgenus includes Tomagnostus (Paratomagnostus) ezhuangensis.	
Trachoparia elongata	Sp. nov	Valid	Yuan et al.	Cambrian	Changhia Formation	China		
Trachoparia intermedia	Sp. nov	Valid	Yuan et al.	Cambrian	Changhia Formation	China		
Trachoparia spinosa	Sp. nov	Valid	Yuan et al.	Cambrian	Changhia Formation	China		
Triangulopyge	Gen. et comb. nov	Valid	Høyberget & Bruton	Cambrian		Norway; Sweden; United Kingdom	A member of the family Olenidae. The type species is "Olenus" humilis Phillips (1848); genus also includes "Sphaerophthalmus" majusculus Linnarsson (1880) and T. major (Lake, 1913).	
Tsunyidiscus pengshuiensis	Sp nov	Valid	Zhang & Clarkson	Cambrian		China	An eodiscoid trilobite, a species of Tsunyidiscus.	
Ulania concava	Sp. nov	Valid	Yuan et al.	Cambrian	Changhia Formation	China		
Utagnostus primitivus	Sp. nov	Valid	Yuan et al.	Cambrian	Changhia Formation	China	A member of the family Clavagnostidae.	
Utagnostus sulcatus	Sp. nov	Valid	Yuan et al.	Cambrian	Changhia Formation	China	A member of the family Clavagnostidae.	
Woqishanaspis	Gen. et comb. nov	Valid	Yuan et al.	Cambrian	Changhia Formation	China	A member of the family Ignotogregatidae. Genus includes W. trapezoidalis (Lin, 1984).	
Wutaishanaspis yangjiazhuangensis	Sp. nov	Valid	Yuan et al.	Cambrian	Changhia Formation	China		
Xenolorenzella granulosa	Sp. nov	Valid	Yuan et al.	Cambrian	Changhia Formation	China		
Yichengocephalus	Gen. et sp. nov	Valid	Yuan et al.	Cambrian	Changhia Formation	China	A member of the family Solenopleuridae. Genus includes new species Y. latus.	
Yongwolia quadrata	Sp. nov	Valid	Yuan et al.	Cambrian	Changhia Formation	China		
Yushugouia ezhuangensis	Sp. nov	Valid	Yuan et al.	Cambrian	Changhia Formation	China		
Zhangxiaspis	Gen. et sp. nov	Valid	Yuan et al.	Cambrian	Changhia Formation	China	A member of the family Ptychopariidae. Genus includes new species Z. subcylindrica.	
Zhongtiaoshanella	Gen. et sp. nov	Valid	Yuan et al.	Cambrian	Changhia Formation	China	A member of the family Crepicephalidae. Genus includes new species Z. brevispinosa.	
Zhongweia convexa	Sp. nov	Valid	Yuan et al.	Cambrian	Changhia Formation	China		
Zhujia yangjiazhuangensis	Sp. nov	Valid	Yuan et al.	Cambrian	Changhia Formation	China	A member of Ptychopariida belonging to the family Anomocarellidae.	
Zichuanaspis	Gen. et 2 sp. et comb. nov	Valid	Yuan et al.	Cambrian	Changhia Formation	China	A member of the family Leiostegiidae. Genus includes Zichuanaspis acerius (Walcott, 1905) and Z. catinus (Resser & Endo in Endo & Resser, 1937), as well as new species Z. yangjiazhuangensis and possibly Z? latilimbata.	

== Others ==
Name	Novelty	Status	Authors	Age	Unit	Location	Notes	Images
Australimicola	Gen. et sp.	Valid	Paterson, García-Bellido and Edgecombe	Early Cambrian	The Emu Bay Shale Konservat-Lagerstätte	Australia	An artiopodan arthropod. The type species is Australimicola spriggi.	
Kangacaris shui	Sp. nov	Valid	Zhang, Fu & Dai	Lower Cambrian	Chengjiang lagerstätte	China	A species of Kangacaris.	
Luohuilinella	Gen. et sp. nov	Valid	Zhang, Fu & Dai	Lower Cambrian	Chengjiang Lagerstätte	China	A possible member of Xandarellida. The type species is Luohuilinella rarus.	Luohuilinella
Nereocaris	Gen. et sp. nov	Valid	Legg et al.	Cambrian	Burgess Shale Formation	Canada	A bivalved arthropod, one of the basalmost known arthropods. The type species is Nereocaris exilis.	Nereocaris exilis
Pleuralata	Gen. et sp. nov	Valid	McCoy, Strother and Briggs	Silurian (Llandovery)	Tuscarora Formation	United States	An arthropod of uncertain phylogenetic affinities, a probable tracemaker of Arthrophycus alleghaniensis trace fossils. The type species is Pleuralata spinosa.	
Scolopocryptops simojovelensis	Sp. nov	Valid	Edgecombe et al.	Miocene		Mexico	A scolopocryptopid scolopendromorph centipede, a species of Scolopocryptops.	
Sinoleperditia hamadai	Sp. nov	Valid	Tanaka, Ono and Maeda	Early Devonian		Japan	A member of Leperditicopida (a group of arthropods of uncertain affinities, classified as ostracods or excluded from this group by different authors), a species of Sinoleperditia.	
Sinoleperditia huyeni	Sp. nov	Valid	Tanaka, Phong and Komatsu	Early Devonian		Vietnam	A member of Leperditicopida, a species of Sinoleperditia.	
Squamacula buckorum	Species	Valid	Paterson, García-Bellido and Edgecombe	Early Cambrian	The Emu Bay Shale Konservat-Lagerstätte	Australia	An artiopodan arthropod, a species of Squamacula.	
