= Crepicephalus =

Crepicephalus Temporal range: Dresbachian

Scientific classification
- Kingdom: Animalia
- Phylum: Arthropoda
- Clade: †Artiopoda
- Class: †Trilobita
- Order: †Ptychopariida
- Family: †Crepicephalidae
- Genus: †Crepicephalus; Owen, 1852

Species
- Crepicephalus iowensis Owen, 1852 (type) = Dikelocephalus iowensis

Synonyms
- Crepiceaphlus; Crepicepalus; Crepicocephalus; Sneedvillia

Crepicephalus is an extinct genus from a well-known class of fossil marine arthropods, the trilobites. It lived from 501 to 490 million years ago during the Dresbachian faunal stage of the late Cambrian Period.

== Reassigned species ==
Some species, previously described as Crepicephalus have since been moved to other genera.

- C. angusta = Kochaspis angusta
- C. convexus = Crepicephalina convexa
- C. liliana = Kochaspis liliana
- C. nitidus = Dunderbergia nitida
- C. quadrans = Ehmaniella quadrans
- C. unca = Uncaspis unca
