= Igarkiella =

Igarkiella Temporal range: 505–501 Ma

Scientific classification
- Domain: Eukaryota
- Kingdom: Animalia
- Phylum: Arthropoda
- Class: †Trilobita
- Order: †Asaphida
- Family: †Anomocaridae
- Genus: †Igarkiella; Rozova, 1964

Species
- I. igarkaensis

Extinct genus of trilobites

Igarkiella is an extinct genus of trilobite containing a single described species Igarkiella igarkaensis. The species is known from fossils dating to 505 to 501 million years ago during the Cambrian Period. The fossils were described from an outcrop of the Labaz Formations Saami Member along the Kulyumbe River in Krasnoyar, Russia.
