= Kolbinella =

Kolbinella Temporal range: Early Botomian

Scientific classification
- Domain: Eukaryota
- Kingdom: Animalia
- Phylum: Arthropoda
- Class: †Trilobita
- Order: †Asaphida
- Family: †Anomocaridae
- Genus: †Kolbinella; Repina, 1960

Extinct genus of trilobites

Kolbinella is an extinct genus of trilobites in the family Anomocaridae. The genus lived during the early part of the Botomian stage, which lasted from approximately 524 to 518.5 million years ago. This faunal stage was part of the Cambrian Period.
