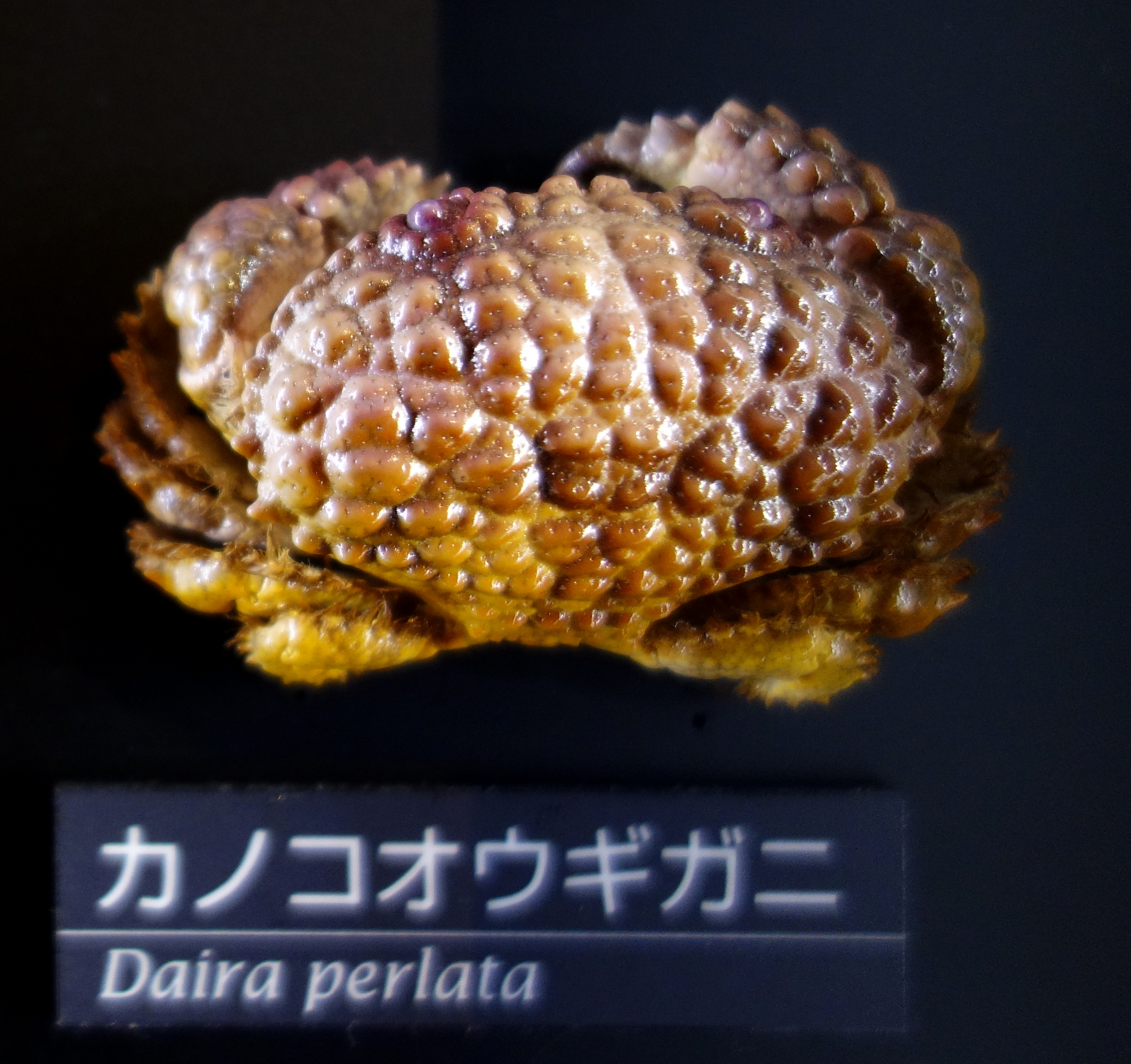
- Daira perlata

Scientific classification
- Kingdom: Animalia
- Phylum: Arthropoda
- Clade: Pancrustacea
- Class: Malacostraca
- Order: Decapoda
- Suborder: Pleocyemata
- Clade: Reptantia
- Infraorder: Brachyura
- Section: Eubrachyura
- Subsection: Heterotremata
- Superfamily: Dairoidea; Serène, 1965

Families
- Dacryopilumnidae; Dairidae

= Dairoidea =

Dairoidea Temporal range: Eocene–Recent

Superfamily of crabs

Dairoidea is a superfamily of crabs, comprising two families which each contain a single genus: Dairidae (the living fossil Daira) and Dacryopilumnidae (Dacryopilumnus) .

== Species ==
Dairidae

- Daira americana Stimpson, 1860
- Daira coronata Beschin, De Angeli, Checchi & Zarantonello, 2005 †
- Daira depressa (A. Milne-Edwards, 1865) †
- Daira perlata (Herbst, 1790)
- Daira salebrosa Beschin, Busulini, De Angeli & Tessier, 2002 †
- Daira sicula (Di Salvo, 1933) †
- Daira speciosa (Reuss, 1871) †
- Daira vulgaris Portell & Collins, 2004 †

Dacryopilumnidae

- Dacryopilumnus eremita Nobili, 1906
- Dacryopilumnus rathbunae Balss, 1932
