= Craspedisia cornuta =

Scientific classification
- Domain: Eukaryota
- Kingdom: Animalia
- Phylum: Arthropoda
- Subphylum: Chelicerata
- Class: Arachnida
- Order: Araneae
- Infraorder: Araneomorphae
- Family: Theridiidae
- Genus: Craspedisia
- Species: C. cornuta

Binomial name
- Craspedisia cornuta (Keyserling, 1891)

Species of spider

Craspedisia cornuta is a species of comb-footed spider in the family Theridiidae. It is found in Brazil.
