= Irinia =

Irinia Temporal range: Cambrian

Scientific classification
- Domain: Eukaryota
- Kingdom: Animalia
- Phylum: Arthropoda
- Class: †Trilobita
- Order: †Asaphida
- Family: †Anomocaridae
- Genus: †Irinia; Egorova and Savitsky, 1968

Extinct genus of trilobites

Irinia is an extinct genus of trilobites in the family Anomocaridae. It lived during the Cambrian Period that lasted from approximately 539 to 485 million years ago.
