= Dacryopilumnus =

Scientific classification
- Domain: Eukaryota
- Kingdom: Animalia
- Phylum: Arthropoda
- Class: Malacostraca
- Order: Decapoda
- Suborder: Pleocyemata
- Infraorder: Brachyura
- Superfamily: Dairoidea
- Family: Dacryopilumnidae; Serène, 1984
- Genus: Dacryopilumnus; Nobili, 1906

Genus of crabs

Dacryopilumnus is a genus of crabs belonging to the monotypic family Dacryopilumnidae.

The species of this genus are found in Pacific and Indian Ocean.

Species:

- Dacryopilumnus eremita Nobili, 1906
- Dacryopilumnus rathbunae Balss, 1932
