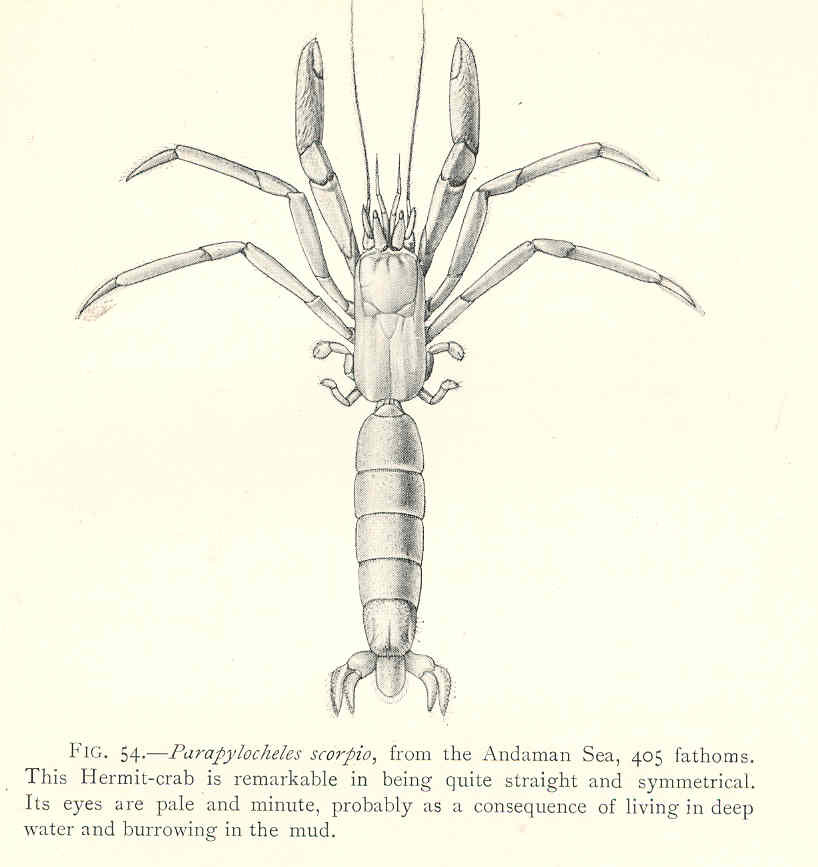

Scientific classification
- Kingdom: Animalia
- Phylum: Arthropoda
- Class: Malacostraca
- Order: Decapoda
- Suborder: Pleocyemata
- Infraorder: Anomura
- Family: Pylochelidae
- Genus: Parapylocheles; Alcock, 1901
- Species: P. scorpio

Binomial name
- Parapylocheles scorpio (Alcock, 1894)

= Parapylocheles =

Species of crab

Parapylocheles scorpio is a species of hermit crab in the family Pylochelidae. It lives at depths from 200 to 925 meters in the Indo-West Pacific, in Indonesia and the Philippines, although it may live in water as shallow as 100 meters in wood fragments, tusk shells, and pieces of bamboo. It is the only member of the genus Parapylocheles.
