= Abharella =

Abharella Temporal range: 501.0–488.3 Ma

Scientific classification
- Kingdom: Animalia
- Phylum: Arthropoda
- Clade: †Artiopoda
- Class: †Trilobita
- Order: †Asaphida
- Family: †Anomocaridae
- Genus: †Abharella; Wittke, 1984

Species
- A. magnocula

Extinct genus of trilobites

Abharella is a genus of trilobite that belongs to the family Anomocaridae. The genus was first described from the Alborz Mountains in Iran, and has been found in France and possibly Turkey.
