= Aponileus =

Aponileus Temporal range: Upper Floian (Blackhillsian)

Scientific classification
- Kingdom: Animalia
- Phylum: Arthropoda
- Clade: †Artiopoda
- Class: †Trilobita
- Order: †Proetida
- Family: †Bathyuridae
- Genus: †Aponileus; Hu, 1963

Type species
- †Aponileus latus Hu, 1963

Extinct genus of trilobites

Aponileus is an extinct genus of trilobites. Chung-Hung Hu circumscribed the genus in 1963. The genus was once considered a junior subjective synonym of the genus Psephosthenaspis but it is considered to be a distinct genus again. As of 2021, fossils have been found in Greenland, Texas, and Utah. They all date to the Upper Floian (Blackhillsian) within the Ordovician Period.

== Taxonomic history ==
Aponileus was initially circumscribed by Chung-Hung Hu in 1963. The type species is A. latus, also described by Hu in 1963. The type material was poorly preserved. Hu initially said that Aponileus is "most like Nileus", i.e., treating it as a nileid. Subsequently, this genus received "virtually no mention" in the trilobite literature for many years, aside from C. P. Hughes's 1979 assessment that two specimens which Lehi F. Hintze had tentatively assigned to Barrandia in 1953 should be placed in Aponileus. In 2003, Jonathan M. Adrain synonymized Aponileus with Psephosthenaspis, placing it in the family Bathyuridae.

In 2012, Adrain and Neo E. B. McAdams treated Aponileus as a distinct genus within Bathyuridae. They also included the species A. glaber, which Christian Poulsen had initially described in the genus Bolbocephalus in 1927. Adrain and McAdams placed five newly described species in Aponilus, namely A. aasei, A. belkaae, A. laikaae, A. strelkaae, and A. ugolekae; they also tentatively assigned a further newly described species to this genus: A.? veterokae. While they believed the "best supported current hypotheses" was to place it in Aponileus, they acknowledged it is "very different from all other species included in the genus" and hence "assign[ed] the species only with question".

Various specific epithets are named after Soviet space dogs like Laika, Belka, Strelka, Ugolyok, and Veterok.

== Phylogeny ==
In 2012, Adrain and McAdams said they believed that Aponileus was likely related to the "Acidiphorus group", but said that the sister group remained unclear. While Psephosthenaspis resembles Aponileus, Adrain and McAdams believe they belong to distinct clades.

Aponileus laikaae is the basal species.

== Distribution ==
Chronologically, Aponileus is found entirely within the Lower Ordovician, specifically the upper Floian (Blackhillsian). The genus's type species, A. latus, has found in the El Paso Formation within the Franklin Mountains of west Texas. A. glaber was found in Washington Land, in northwestern Greenland. The remaining species, which Adrain and McAdams first described in 2012, are all from the Confusion Range in Millard County, Utah.

== Species ==
As of 2021, the following species are recognized:

- A. latus Hu, 1963 — Texas
- A. aasei Adrain & McAdams, 2012 — Utah
- A. glaber (Poulsen, 1927) — Greenland
- A. laikaae Adrain & McAdams, 2012 — Utah
- A. belkaae Adrain & McAdams, 2012 — Utah
- A. strelkaae Adrain & McAdams, 2012 — Utah
- A. ugolekae Adrain & McAdams, 2012— Utah
- A.? veterokae Adrain & McAdams, 2012 — Utah

== See also ==
- 2012 in arthropod paleontology § Trilobites
