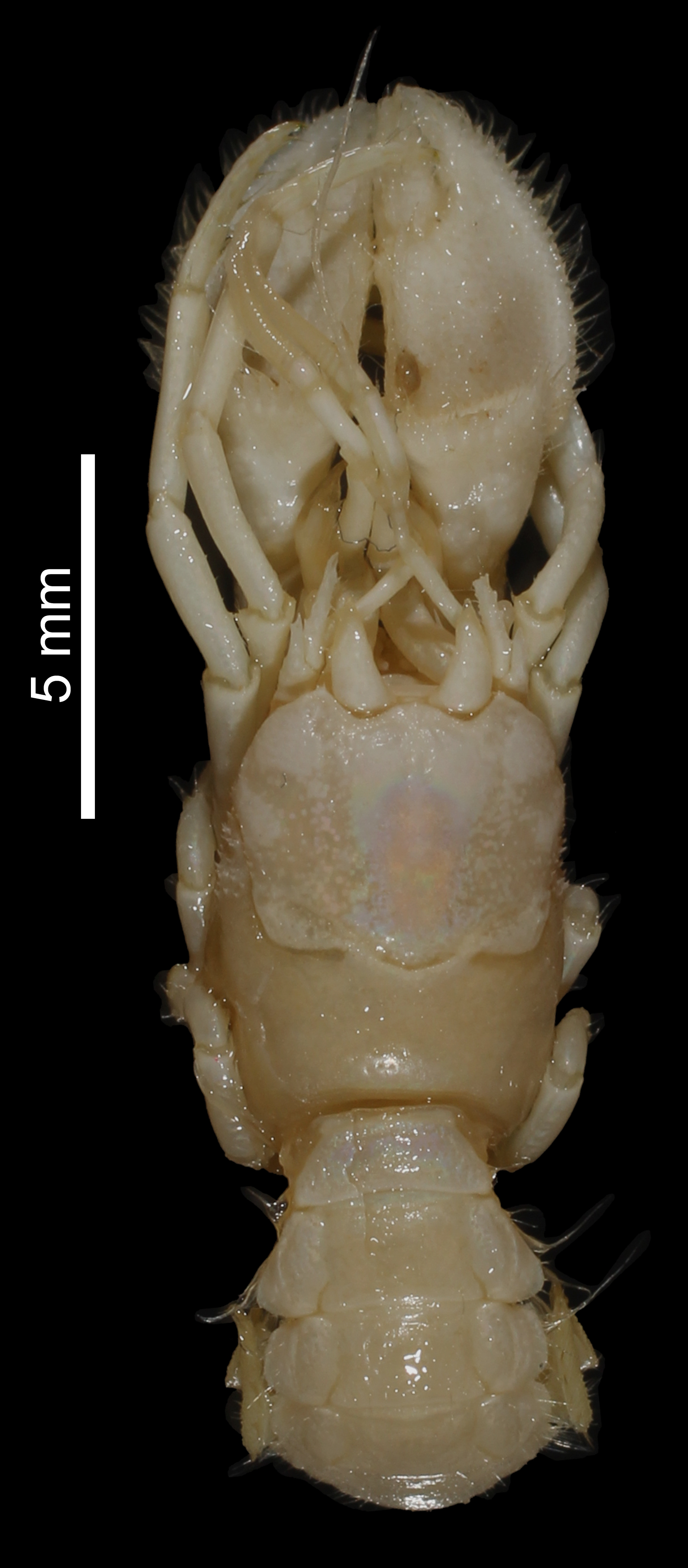
- Cheiroplatea pumicicola

Scientific classification
- Domain: Eukaryota
- Kingdom: Animalia
- Phylum: Arthropoda
- Class: Malacostraca
- Order: Decapoda
- Suborder: Pleocyemata
- Infraorder: Anomura
- Family: Pylochelidae
- Subfamily: Pylochelinae
- Genus: Cheiroplatea; Spence Bate, 1888

Type species
- Cheiroplatea cenobita Spence Bate, 1888

Synonyms
- Cheiroplataea Spence Bate, 1888; Chiroplatea Spence Bate, 1888; Chiroplates Spence Bate, 1888

= Cheiroplatea =

Genus of hermit crabs

Cheiroplatea is a genus of hermit crabs within the family Pylochelidae.

== Species ==
- Cheiroplatea cenobita Spence Bate, 1888
- Cheiroplatea laticauda Boas, 1926
- Cheiroplatea mitoi Miyake, 1978
- Cheiroplatea pumicicola Forest, 1987
- Cheiroplatea rotundioculus Komai & T.-Y. Chan, 2016
- Cheiroplatea scutata Ortmann, 1892
- Cheiroplatea stenurus Forest, 1987
