= Afghanocare =

Afghanocare Temporal range: Dresbachian

Scientific classification
- Domain: Eukaryota
- Kingdom: Animalia
- Phylum: Arthropoda
- Class: †Trilobita
- Order: †Asaphida
- Family: †Anomocaridae
- Genus: †Afghanocare; Wolfart, 1975

Species
- A. guizhouensis; A. truncatum

Extinct genus of trilobites

Afghanocare is an extinct genus from a well-known class of fossil marine arthropods, the trilobites. It lived from 501 to 490 million years ago during the Dresbachian faunal stage of the late Cambrian Period.
