= Schoriella =

Schoriella Temporal range: Cambrian

Scientific classification
- Domain: Eukaryota
- Kingdom: Animalia
- Phylum: Arthropoda
- Class: †Trilobita
- Order: †Asaphida
- Family: †Anomocaridae
- Genus: †Schoriella

Extinct genus of trilobites

Schoriella is an extinct genus of trilobites in the family Anomocaridae. The genus lived during the Cambrian Period, which lasted from approximately 539 to 485 million years ago.
