= Lomsucaspis =

Lomsucaspis Temporal range: Cambrian

Scientific classification
- Domain: Eukaryota
- Kingdom: Animalia
- Phylum: Arthropoda
- Class: †Trilobita
- Order: †Asaphida
- Family: †Anomocaridae
- Genus: †Lomsucaspis; Lazarenko & Datsenko, 1967

Extinct genus of trilobites

Lomsucaspis is an extinct genus of trilobites in the family Anomocaridae. The genus lived during the early part of the Cambrian Period, which lasted from approximately 542 to 488 million years ago.
