= Craspedisia longioembolia =

Scientific classification
- Kingdom: Animalia
- Phylum: Arthropoda
- Subphylum: Chelicerata
- Class: Arachnida
- Order: Araneae
- Infraorder: Araneomorphae
- Family: Theridiidae
- Genus: Craspedisia
- Species: C. longioembolia

Binomial name
- Craspedisia longioembolia Yin, Griswold, Bao & Xu, 2003

Species of spider

Craspedisia longioembolia is a species of comb-footed spider in the family Theridiidae. It is found in China.
