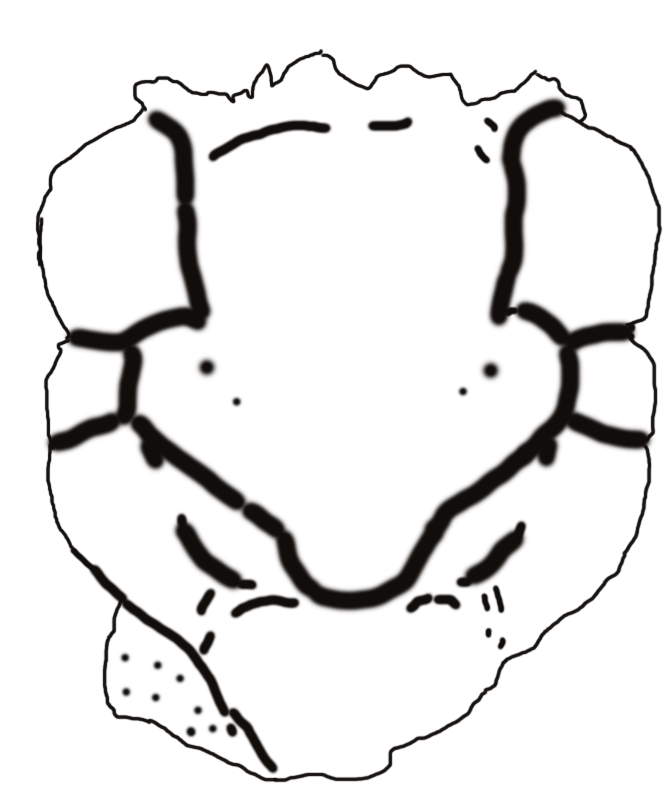
- Illustration of Mesoparapylocheles michaeljacksoni

Scientific classification
- Kingdom: Animalia
- Phylum: Arthropoda
- Clade: Pancrustacea
- Class: Malacostraca
- Order: Decapoda
- Suborder: Pleocyemata
- Infraorder: Anomura
- Family: Pylochelidae
- Genus: †Mesoparapylocheles
- Species: †M. michaeljacksoni

Binomial name
- †Mesoparapylocheles michaeljacksoni Fraaije et al., 2012

= Mesoparapylocheles michaeljacksoni =

Mesoparapylocheles michaeljacksoni Temporal range: Albian–Cenomanian

Extinct species of hermit crab

Mesoparapylocheles michaeljacksoni is an extinct hermit crab species that existed during the Albian or Cenomanian in what is now Spain. It is the type species of the genus Mesoparapylocheles. It was described by René H.B. Fraaije, Adiël A. Klompmaker and Pedro Artal in 2012, and was named after the singer Michael Jackson as it was discovered on June 25, 2009, the day Jackson died.

The shield of the fossilized crab was discovered in the Koskobilo Quarry, in the Navarrese town of Olazagutía, northern Spain.

== See also ==
- List of organisms named after famous people (born 1950–1974)
