= Craspedisia spatulata =

Scientific classification
- Domain: Eukaryota
- Kingdom: Animalia
- Phylum: Arthropoda
- Subphylum: Chelicerata
- Class: Arachnida
- Order: Araneae
- Infraorder: Araneomorphae
- Family: Theridiidae
- Genus: Craspedisia
- Species: C. spatulata

Binomial name
- Craspedisia spatulata Bryant, 1948

Species of spider

Craspedisia spatulata is a species of comb-footed spider in the family Theridiidae. It is native of the Dominican Republic.
