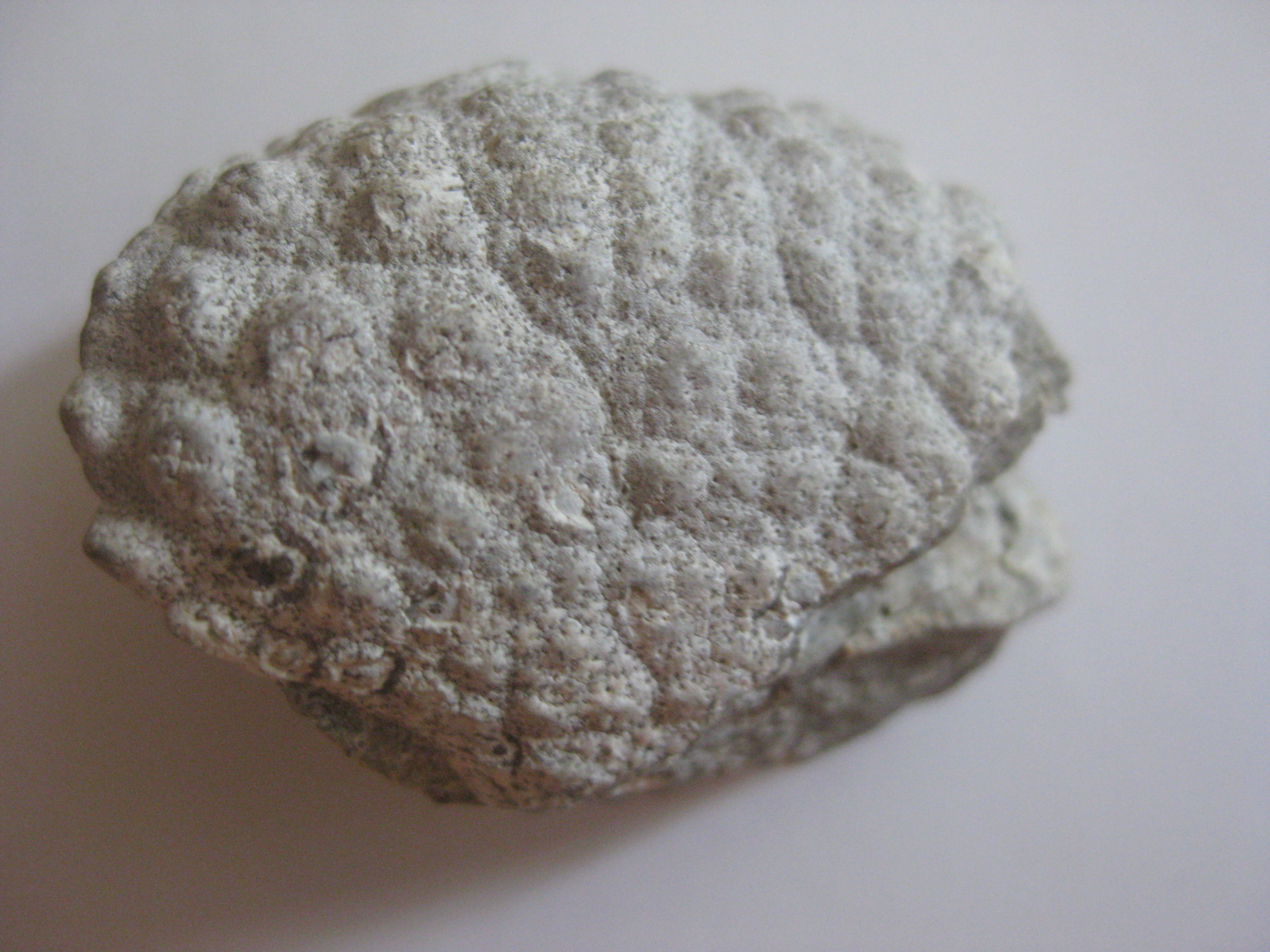
- Daira speciosa carapace

Scientific classification
- Domain: Eukaryota
- Kingdom: Animalia
- Phylum: Arthropoda
- Class: Malacostraca
- Order: Decapoda
- Suborder: Pleocyemata
- Infraorder: Brachyura
- Family: Dairidae
- Genus: Daira
- Species: †D. speciosa

Binomial name
- †Daira speciosa (Reuss, 1871)

= Daira speciosa =

Daira speciosa Temporal range: Miocene

Species of crab

Daira speciosa is an extinct species of crab that lived in the Paratethys sea during the Miocene period. It was up to 4 centimetres (1.6 in) long.
