= Craspedisia =

Craspedisia Temporal range: Neogene– Present
- male C. spatulata

Scientific classification
- Kingdom: Animalia
- Phylum: Arthropoda
- Subphylum: Chelicerata
- Class: Arachnida
- Order: Araneae
- Infraorder: Araneomorphae
- Family: Theridiidae
- Genus: Craspedisia; Simon, 1894

Type species
- C. cornuta (Keyserling, 1891)

Species
- C. cornuta (Keyserling, 1891) – Brazil; C. longioembolia Yin, Griswold, Bao & Xu, 2003 – China; C. spatulata Bryant, 1948 – Hispaniola (Dominican Rep.); † C. yapchoontecki Penney & Marusik in Penney et al. (2012b) – Hispaniola (Dominican Rep.)

Genus of spiders

Craspedisia is a genus of comb-footed spiders that was first described by Eugène Louis Simon in 1894. As of May 2020 it contains three species, found in China, the Dominican Republic, and Brazil: C. cornuta, C. longioembolia, and C. spatulata. It also contains 1 extinct species found in Dominican amber: C. yapchoontecki.

Craspedisia spatulata is 2.2 millimetres (0.087 in) long. C. cornuta females are 3.1 millimetres (0.12 in) long, and males are 2.9 millimetres (0.11 in) long.
