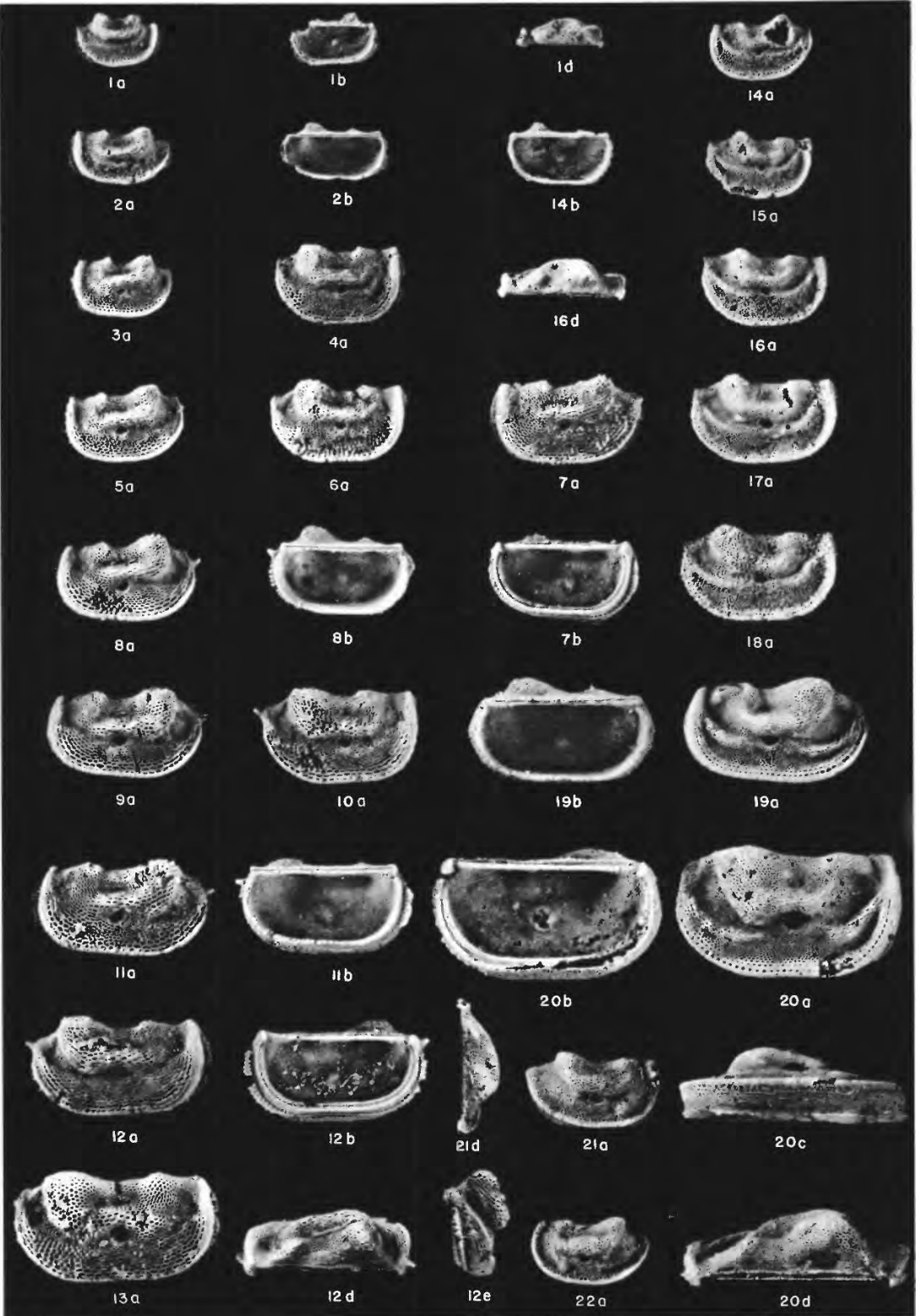
- Valves of the ostracod genus Aurikirkbya

Scientific classification
- Kingdom: Animalia
- Phylum: Arthropoda
- Clade: Pancrustacea
- Class: Ostracoda
- Order: Palaeocopida
- Suborder: †Beyrichicopina
- Family: †Kirkbyidae
- Genus: †Aurikirkbya; Sohn, 1950

= Aurikirkbya =

Aurikirkbya Temporal range: Pennsylvanian-Triassic

Extinct genus of seed shrimp

Aurikirkbya is an extinct genus of ostracod (seed shrimp) belonging to the suborder Beyrichicopina (ornamented beyrichiocopids) and family Kirkbyidae. It is found in Pennsylvanian to Triassic beds in North America, east Asia, southwest Asia, and Europe.

== Species ==
- A. alta Shi 1982
- A. altalobata Becker and Wang 1992
- A. auriformis Sohn 1950
- A. barbarae Sohn 1950
- A. canyonensis Harlton 1929
- A. formula Ishizaki 1964
- A. hispanica Becker et al. 1977
- A. kellettae Harlton 1929
- A. kinshozhanensis Tanaka 2013
- A. miyakei Tanaka and Ono 2012
- A. subkellettae Ishizaki 1964
- A. ventrocallosa Becker and Wang 1992
- A. wordensis Hamilton 1942
- A. wymani Kellett 1933
