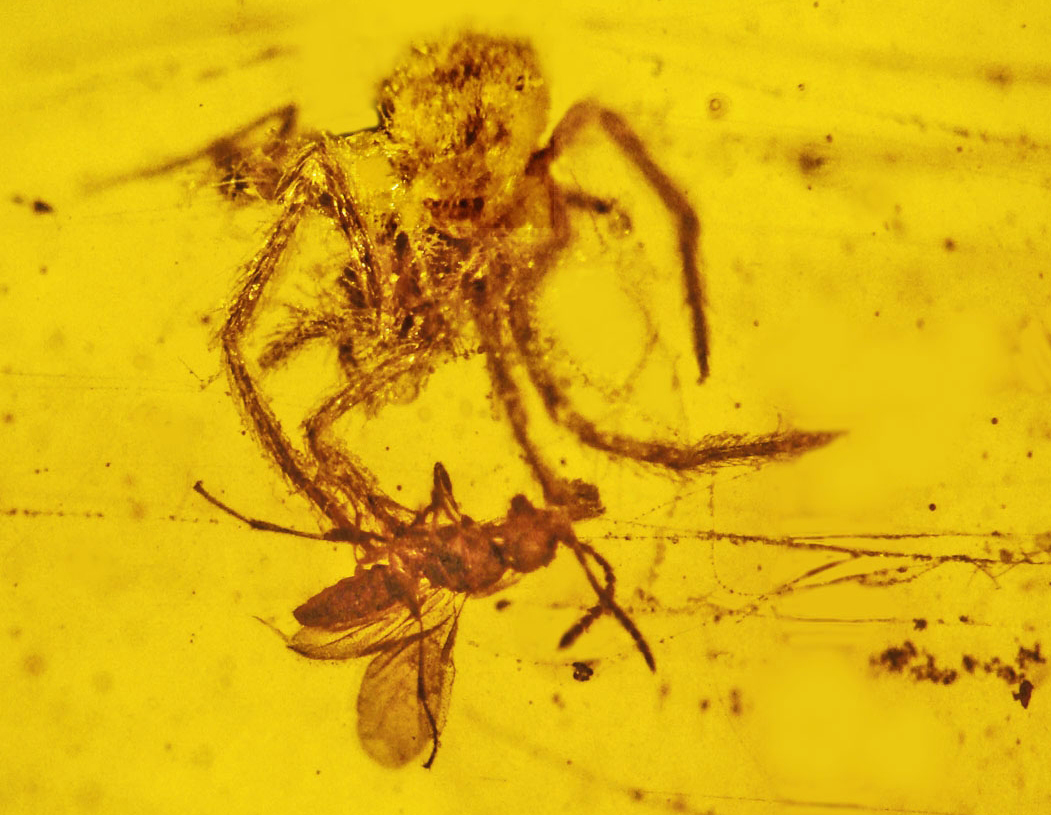
- The amber which shows Geratonephila attacking a wasp (Cascoscelio incassus) in its web

Scientific classification
- Kingdom: Animalia
- Phylum: Arthropoda
- Subphylum: Chelicerata
- Class: Arachnida
- Order: Araneae
- Infraorder: Araneomorphae
- Family: Nephilidae
- Genus: †Geratonephila
- Species: †G. burmanica

Binomial name
- †Geratonephila burmanica Poinar, 2012

Synonyms
- Nephila burmanica

= Geratonephila =

Geratonephila Temporal range: Late Cretaceous (Cenomanian), 100 Ma

Extinct genus of spider

Geratonephila is a genus of spider in the family Nephilidae that lived around 100 million years ago during the Cenomanian stage of the Late Cretaceous Epoch. This genus contains one species, Geratonephila burmanica.

It was discovered in Burmese amber. The amber it was in shows it attacking a species of wasp (Cascoscelio incassus, family Platygastridae) in its web. This shows direct fossil evidence of predatory behavior in this extinct genus of spider. It is the only specimen preserving such behavior.
