= Cretatrizocheles =

Cretatrizocheles Temporal range: Albian–Cenomanian

Scientific classification
- Kingdom: Animalia
- Phylum: Arthropoda
- Class: Malacostraca
- Order: Decapoda
- Suborder: Pleocyemata
- Infraorder: Anomura
- Family: Pylochelidae
- Subfamily: Trizochelinae
- Genus: †Cretatrizocheles; Fraaije, Klompmaker & Artal, 2012
- Species: †C. olazagutiensis

Binomial name
- †Cretatrizocheles olazagutiensis Fraaije, Klompmaker & Artal, 2012

Extinct genus of crustaceans

Cretatrizocheles olazagutiensis is an extinct hermit crab which existed during the Albian or Cenomanian of what is now Spain. It was described by René H.B. Fraaije, Adiël A. Klompmaker and Pedro Artal in 2012, and is the only species in the genus Cretatrizocheles.
