= Daye Formation =

Geologic formation in China

- Stratigraphic range: Induan - early Olenekian, 252.3–250.7 Ma
- Type: Geological formation
- Thickness: ~10 meters

Lithology
- Primary: Shale, limestone

Location
- Region: south China
- Country: China
- Daye Formation (China)

The Daye Formation is a geologic formation in South China, dating from the Induan up to the early Olenekian (early Triassic). It is of interest as it spans the period immediately after the Permian-Triassic extinction event, the most severe mass extinction known in Earth history.

The Daye Formation hosts the Guiyang biota, as of 2023 the earliest known Mesozoic lagerstätte.
