= Sineruga =

Sineruga Temporal range: Ludlow–Pridoli

Scientific classification
- Kingdom: Animalia
- Phylum: Arthropoda
- Class: Ostracoda
- Order: Myodocopida
- Family: incertae sedis
- Genus: †Sineruga
- Species: †S. insolita

Binomial name
- †Sineruga insolita Perrier, 2012

Extinct genus of seed shrimps

Sineruga insolita is a fossil ostracod species which existed in what is now France during the Silurian period. It was described by Vincent Perrier in 2012, and is the only species in the genus Sineruga. It has been found at four sites in the Armorican massif of northwestern France.
