= Orchestina rabagensis =

Orchestina rabagensis Temporal range: Albian

Scientific classification
- Domain: Eukaryota
- Kingdom: Animalia
- Phylum: Arthropoda
- Subphylum: Chelicerata
- Class: Arachnida
- Order: Araneae
- Infraorder: Araneomorphae
- Family: Oonopidae
- Genus: Orchestina
- Species: †O. rabagensis

Binomial name
- †Orchestina rabagensis Saupe et al., 2012

Extinct species of spider

Orchestina rabagensis is an extinct spider which existed in what is now Spain during the late Albian age. It was described in 2012.
