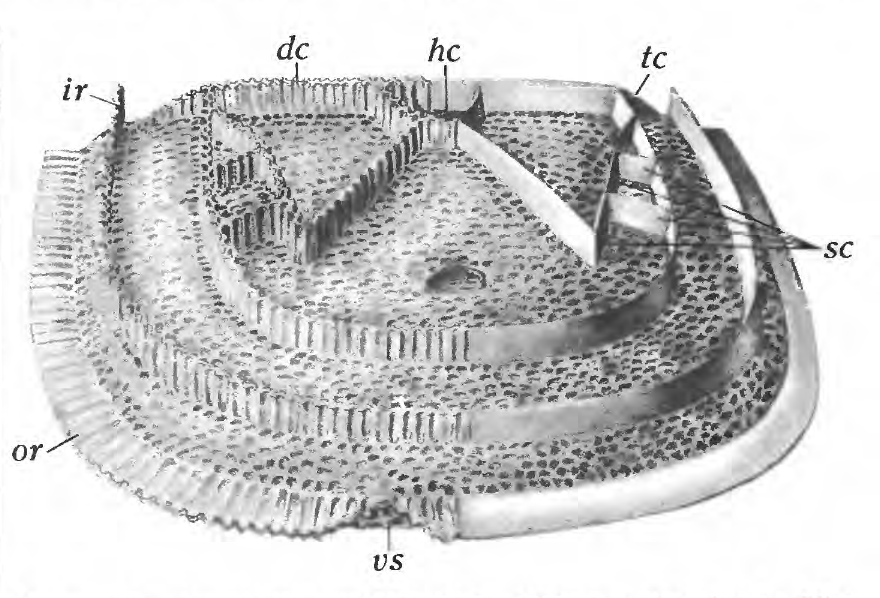
- Sketch of valve of Amphissites costatus Roth

Scientific classification
- Kingdom: Animalia
- Phylum: Arthropoda
- Clade: Pancrustacea
- Class: Ostracoda
- Order: Palaeocopida
- Suborder: †Beyrichicopina
- Family: †Amphissitinae
- Genus: †Amphissites; Girty, 1910

= Amphissites =

Amphissites Temporal range: Devonian-Permian

Extinct genus of seed shrimp

Amphissites is an extinct genus of ostracod (seed shrimp) belonging to the suborder Beyrichicopina (ornamented beyrichiocopids) and family Amphissitinae. Species belonging to the genus lived from the Devonian to the Permian in Europe, North America, Australia, and east Asia. The genus were likely deposit-feeders, and may have survived briefly into the Triassic.

== Species ==
- Amphissites bushi Harlton 1933
- Amphissites carinodus Cooper 1957
- Amphissites centronotus Ulrich and Bassler 1906
- Amphissites dattonensis Harlton 1927
- Amphissites gifuensis Tanaka and Yuan 2012
- Amphissites knighti Sohn 1954
- Amphissites marginiferus Roth 1929
- Amphissites miseri Harlton 1933
- Amphissites neocentronotus Becker and Wang 1992
- Amphissites nodosus Roth 1929
- Amphissites rugosus Girty 1910
- Amphissites sinensis Hou 1954
- Amphissites sosioensis Kozur 1991
- Amphissites subcentronotus Hou 1954
- Amphissites wapanuckensis Harlton 1929
