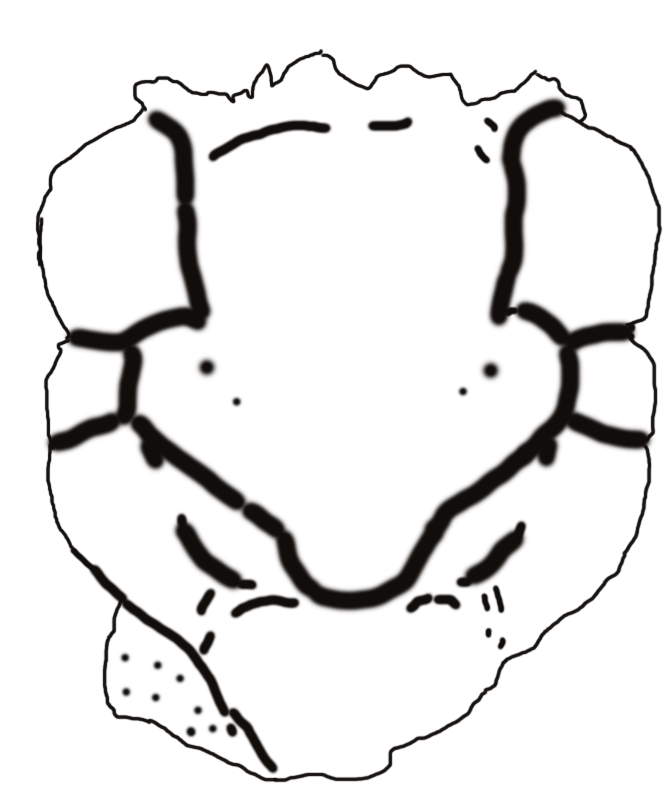
- Illustration of Mesoparapylocheles michaeljacksoni

Scientific classification
- Kingdom: Animalia
- Phylum: Arthropoda
- Clade: Pancrustacea
- Class: Malacostraca
- Order: Decapoda
- Suborder: Pleocyemata
- Infraorder: Anomura
- Family: Pylochelidae
- Genus: †Mesoparapylocheles; Fraaije et al., 2012

Type species
- Mesoparapylocheles michaeljacksoni Fraaije et al., 2012

Species
- See text

= Mesoparapylocheles =

Mesoparapylocheles Temporal range: Kimmeridgian–Cenomanian

Extinct genus of hermit crab

Mesoparapylocheles is an extinct hermit crab genus which existed during the Mesozoic in what is now Europe. It was described by René H.B. Fraaije, Adiël A. Klompmaker and Pedro Artal in 2012. The type species is Mesoparapylocheles michaeljacksoni from the Albian or Cenomanian of Spain; which was named after the singer Michael Jackson. Genus also includes other species from the Late Jurassic (Kimmeridgian) of Germany and from the Late Jurassic (Tithonian) of Austria.

== Species ==
- Mesoparapylocheles jaegeri Fraaije, 2014
- Mesoparapylocheles janetjacksonae Fraaije, Van Bakel, Jagt & Skupien, 2020
- Mesoparapylocheles michaeljacksoni Fraaije, Klompmaker & Artal, 2012 (type)
- Mesoparapylocheles schweigerti Fraaije, 2014
- Mesoparapylocheles strouhali Fraaije, Robins, van Bakel, Jagt & Bachmayer, 2019
- Mesoparapylocheles zapfei Fraaije, Robins, van Bakel, Jagt & Bachmayer, 2019

== See also ==
- List of organisms named after famous people (born 1950–1974)
