= Paracoosia =

Paracoosia Temporal range: Dresbachian

Scientific classification
- Domain: Eukaryota
- Kingdom: Animalia
- Phylum: Arthropoda
- Class: †Trilobita
- Order: †Asaphida
- Family: †Anomocaridae
- Genus: †Paracoosia; Kobayashi, 1936

Species
- P. huayuanensis; P. kingi

Extinct genus of trilobites

Paracoosia is an extinct genus of trilobites in the family Anomocaridae. The genus lived from 501 to 490 million years ago during the Dresbachian faunal stage of the late Cambrian Period.
