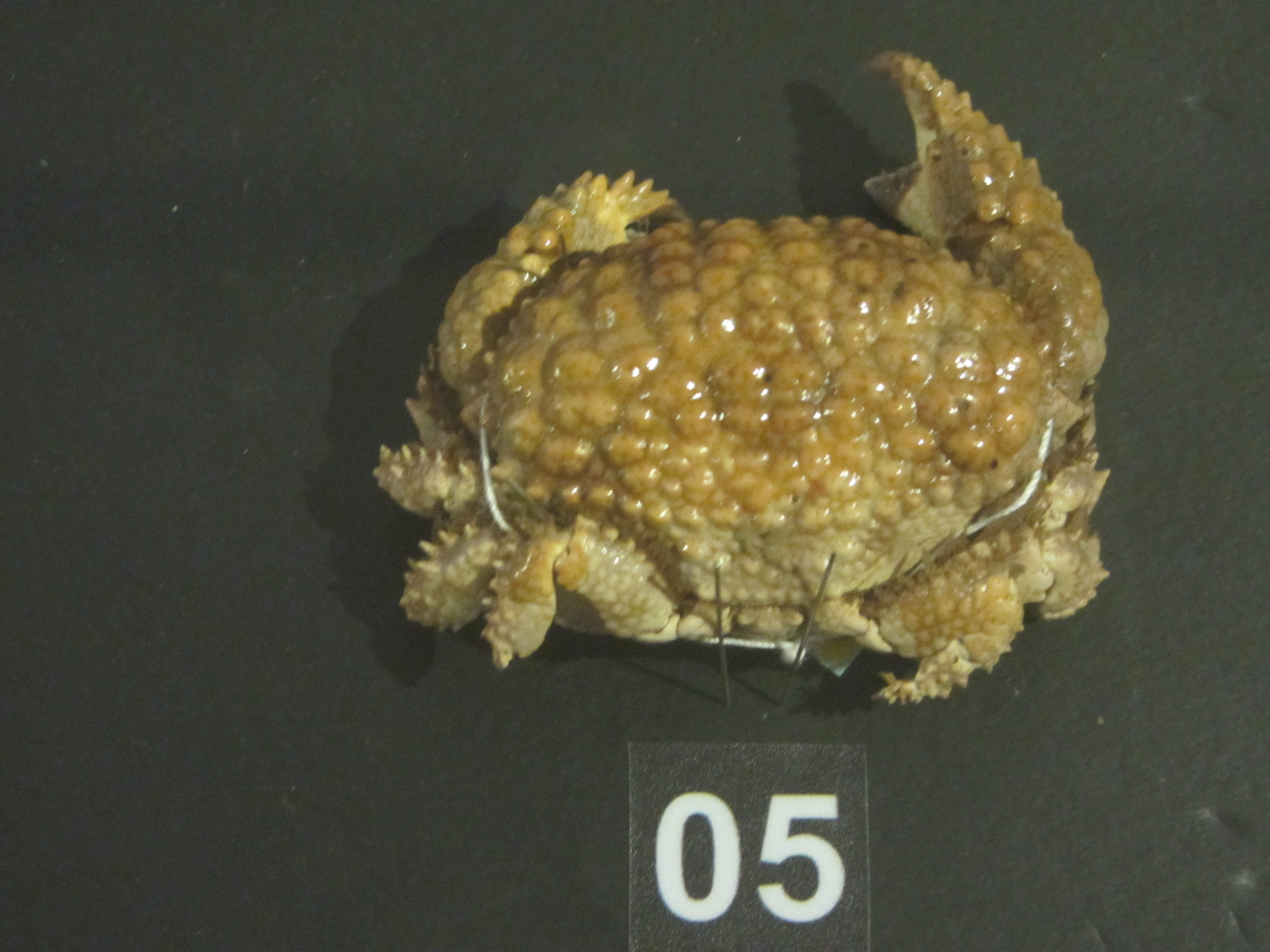
- Daira perlata

Scientific classification
- Domain: Eukaryota
- Kingdom: Animalia
- Phylum: Arthropoda
- Class: Malacostraca
- Order: Decapoda
- Suborder: Pleocyemata
- Infraorder: Brachyura
- Superfamily: Dairoidea
- Family: Dairidae; P.K.L. Ng & Rodríguez, 1986
- Genus: Daira; De Haan, 1833

Synonyms
- Cancer De Haan, 1833; Lagostoma H. Milne Edwards, 1834

= Daira (crab) =

Genus of crabs

Daira is a genus of crabs and is the only genus in the family Dairidae.

The genus has almost cosmopolitan distribution.

Species:

- Daira americana Stimpson, 1860
- Daira coronata Beschin, 2005
- Daira depressa Milne-Edwards, 1865
- Daira eocaenica Lorenthey, 1898
- Daira eocenica Di Salvo, 1933
- Daira gabertii Milne Edwards, 1830
- Daira perlata (Herbst, 1790)
- Daira salebrosa Beschin et al., 2002
- Daira sicula Di Salvo, 1933
- Daira speciosa Reuss, 1871
- Daira vulgaris Portell & Collins, 2004
