= Krasnoyar =

Krasnoyar Краснояр
- Village
- Location within Bashkortostan Location within Russia
- Coordinates: 53°58′N 54°28′E
- Country: Russia
- Region: Bashkortostan
- District: Belebeyevsky District
- Time zone: UTC+5:00

Krasnoyar (Russian: Краснояр) is a rural locality (a village) in Slakbashevsky Selsoviet, Belebeyevsky District, Bashkortostan, Russia. The population was 94 as of 2010. There is one street.

== Geography ==
Krasnoyar is located 37 km southeast of Belebey (the district's administrative centre) by road. Kanash is the nearest rural locality.
