= Monkaspis =

Monkaspis Temporal range: Cambrian

Scientific classification
- Kingdom: Animalia
- Phylum: Arthropoda
- Clade: †Artiopoda
- Class: †Trilobita
- Order: †Asaphida
- Genus: †Monkaspis; Kobayashi, 1935

Genus of trilobites

Monkaspis is an extinct genus from a well-known class of fossil marine arthropods, the trilobites. It lived during the Cambrian Period, which lasted from approximately 542 to 488 million years ago.
