= Neocytherideididae =

Scientific classification
- Kingdom: Animalia
- Phylum: Arthropoda
- Clade: Pancrustacea
- Class: Ostracoda
- Order: Podocopida
- Family: Neocytherideididae

Synonyms
- Neocytherideidae

Family of crustaceans

Neocytherideididae is a family of ostracods belonging to the order Podocopida.

Genera:

- Copytus Skogsberg, 1939
- Hemicytherideis Ruggieri, 1952
- Microhoweina Mohammed & Keyser, 2012
- Neocopytus Kulkoyluoglu, Colin & Kiliç, 2007
- Neocytherideis Puri, 1952
- Papillosacythere Whatley, Chadwick, Coxill & Toy, 1987
- Procytherideis Ruggieri, 1978
- Sahnia Puri, 1952
- Sahnicythere Athersuch, 1982
