= Orchestina gappi =

Orchestina gappi Temporal range: Albian

Scientific classification
- Domain: Eukaryota
- Kingdom: Animalia
- Phylum: Arthropoda
- Subphylum: Chelicerata
- Class: Arachnida
- Order: Araneae
- Infraorder: Araneomorphae
- Family: Oonopidae
- Genus: Orchestina
- Species: †O. gappi

Binomial name
- †Orchestina gappi Saupe et al., 2012

Extinct species of spider

Orchestina gappi is an extinct spider which existed in what is now France during the late Albian age. It was described in 2012.
