= Anomocaridae =

Anomocaridae Temporal range: 513.0–488.3 Ma

Scientific classification
- Kingdom: Animalia
- Phylum: Arthropoda
- Clade: †Artiopoda
- Class: †Trilobita
- Order: †Asaphida
- Superfamily: †Anomocaroidea
- Family: †Anomocaridae; Poulsen, 1927

Genera
- See text

Extinct family of trilobites

Anomocaridae is a family of trilobites, containing the following genera:

- Abharella
- Afghanocare
- Amginia
- Anomocare
- Anomocarina
- Anomocarioides
- Anomocariopsis
- Callaspis
- Chondranomocare
- Dilatalimbus
- Elandaspis
- Eocatuniella
- Forchammeria
- Formosocephalus
- Fuquania
- Glyphanellus
- Glyphaspellus
- Guizhouanomocare
- Hanivella
- Harataspis
- Hunanaspis
- Igarkiella
- lohomia
- Irinia
- Jimanomocare
- Juraspis
- Kokuria
- Kolbinella
- Kotuia
- Leichneyella
- Lomsucaspis
- Longxumenia
- Macrotoxus
- Metanomocare
- Nadiyella
- Palella
- Paracoosia
- Parakotuia
- Paranomocare
- Pjatkovaspellus
- Qinlingia
- Rectifrontinella
- Sachaspis
- Schoriecare
- Schoriella
- Scintilla
- Sivovella
- Usovinurus
- Wutingshania
- Yongwolia
