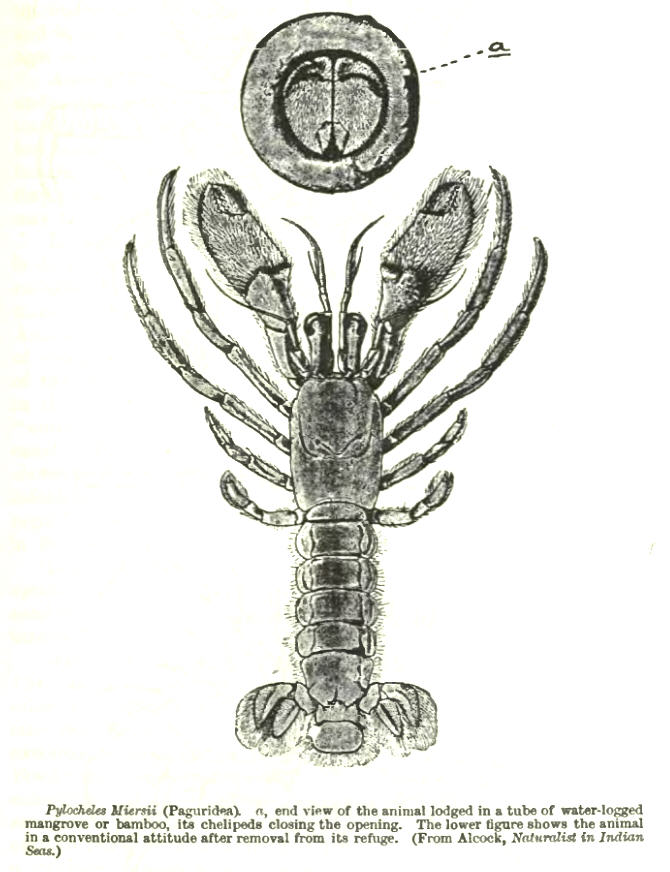
- Pylocheles miersii

Scientific classification
- Kingdom: Animalia
- Phylum: Arthropoda
- Clade: Pancrustacea
- Class: Malacostraca
- Order: Decapoda
- Suborder: Pleocyemata
- Infraorder: Anomura
- Superfamily: Paguroidea
- Family: Pylochelidae; Bate, 1888

Type genus
- Pylocheles A. Milne-Edwards, 1880

Synonyms
- Pomatochelidae T. R. R. Stebbing, 1914

= Pylochelidae =

Pylochelidae Temporal range: Late Jurassic–Recent

Family of crustaceans

The Pylochelidae are a family of hermit crabs. Its members are commonly called the 'symmetrical hermit crabs'. They live in all the world's oceans, except the Arctic and the Antarctic, at depths of 2,000 m (6,600 ft). Due to their cryptic nature and relative scarcity, only around 60 specimens had been collected before 1987, when a monograph was published detailing a further 400.

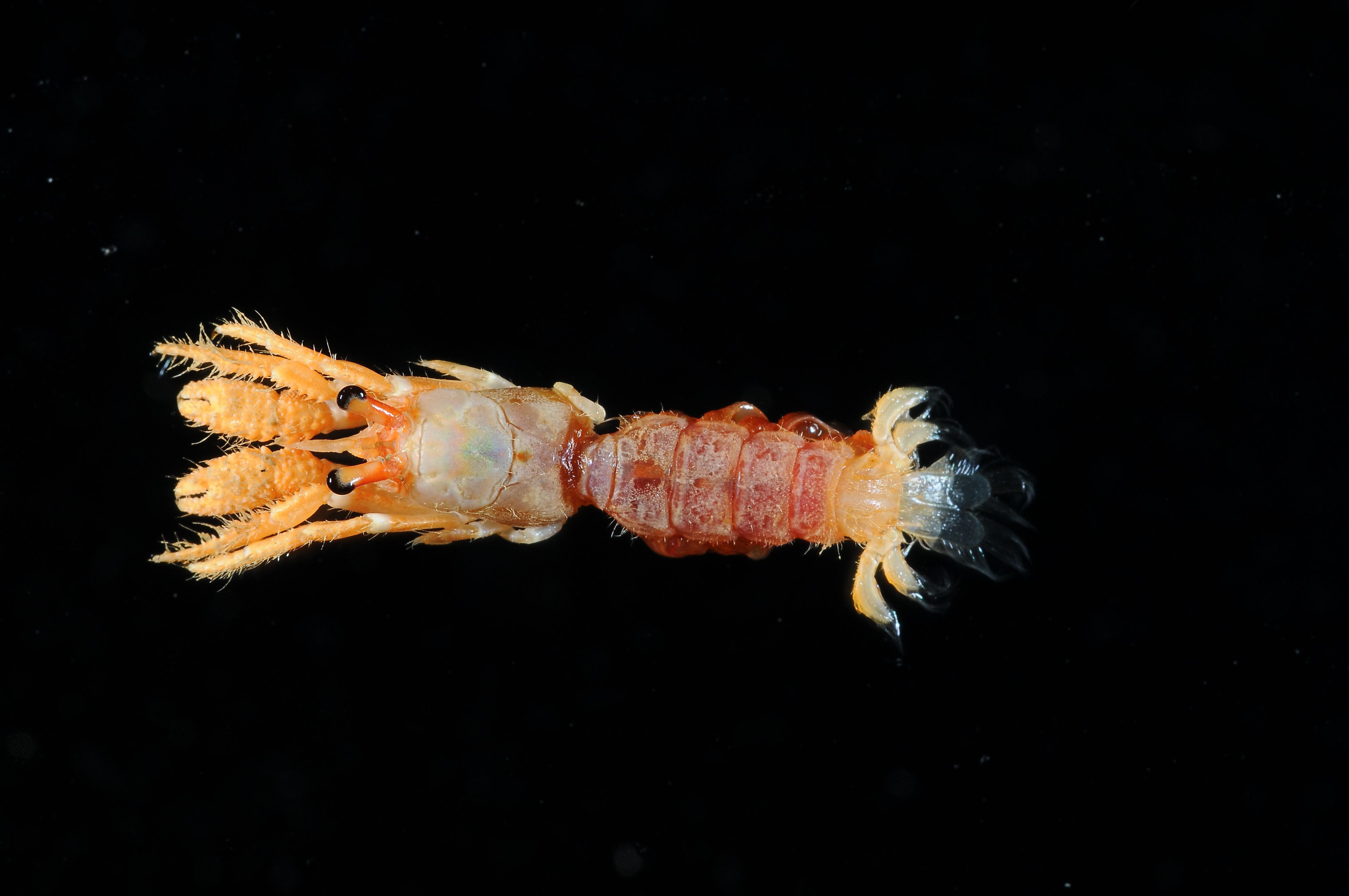

== Description ==
Unlike other hermit crabs, pylochelid hermit crabs are not markedly asymmetrical, with a straight body and equal numbers of appendages on both sides. This characteristic, together with the partial calcification of the abdomen (which is soft in other hermit crabs) led Edward J. Miers, when describing the first species, to consider it to represent a transition between hermit crabs and "Macrura" (long-tailed decapods, such as lobsters and shrimp). Correspondingly, pylochelid hermit crabs do not usually inhabit gastropod shells, but instead withdraw into decayed pieces of wood, stones, tusk shells (especially Dentaliidae), living sponges, pieces of bamboo or mangroves. Their claws are often adapted to form an operculum, which closes off the entrance to their home.

== Distribution ==
Although the family as a whole has a global distribution, diversity is concentrated in the Indo-Pacific, with only four species being found in the western Atlantic Ocean and Caribbean Sea (Cheiroplatea scutata, Pylocheles agassizii, Bathycheles cubensis and Mixtopagurus paradoxus). Pylochelid hermit crabs inhabit a great range in water depths, from 100 to 2,200 m (330 to 7,220 ft), with most living between 200 and 500 m (660 and 1,640 ft) deep.

== Genera ==
The family contains 48 species in 12 genera:

- Bathycheles – six species
- Cancellocheles – one species
- Cheiroplatea – six species
- †Cretatrizocheles – one species
- Forestocheles – one species
- †Mesoparapylocheles - six species
- Mixtopagurus – one species
- Parapylocheles - one species
- Pomatocheles – three species
- Pylocheles – two species
- Trizocheles – eighteen species
- Xylocheles – two species
