= Paleobiota of Burmese amber =

Fossil resin from the Hukawng Valley, Myanmar

Burmese amber is fossil resin dating to the early Late Cretaceous Cenomanian age recovered from deposits in the Hukawng Valley of northern Myanmar. It is known for being one of the most diverse Cretaceous age amber paleobiotas, containing rich arthropod fossils, along with uncommon vertebrate fossils and even rare marine inclusions. A mostly complete list of all taxa described up to the end of 2023 can be found in Ross (2024).

== Plants ==
=== Chlorophyte green algaes ===
==== Chlamydomonadales ====
| Family | Genus | Species | Authority | Year described | Notes | image |
|---|---|---|---|---|---|---|
| Chlamydomonadaceae | Chlamydomonas | †Chlamydomonas hanublikanus | Hinkelman & Vršanská | 2020 | A chlamydomonadaceous green algae. Associated with Mesoblatta maxi and the ichnotaxon Blattocoprolites blattulidae | |

=== Bryophyte true mosses ===
==== Dicranales ====
| Family | Genus | Species | Authority | Year described | Notes | image |
|---|---|---|---|---|---|---|
| Calymperaceae | †Calymperites | †Calymperites burmensis | Heinrichs 'et al. | 2014 | A Calymperaceous dicranale moss | |
| Calymperaceae | †Calymperites | †Calymperites chenianus | Li in Tan et al. | 2025 | A Calymperaceous dicranale moss | |
| Calymperaceae | †Calymperites | †Calymperites heinrichsianus | Li & Wang in Li et al. | 2025 | A Calymperaceous dicranale moss | |
| Calymperaceae | †Calymperites | †Calymperites marginatus | Li et al. | 2025 | A Calymperaceous dicranale moss | |
| Calymperaceae | †Calymperites | †Calymperites proboscideus | Li in Tan et al. | 2025 | A Calymperaceous dicranale moss | |
| Calymperaceae | †Calymperites | †Calymperites striatus | Li et al. | 2025 | A Calymperaceous dicranale moss | |
| Incertae sedis | †Ditrichites | †Ditrichites aristatus | Li in Tan et al. | 2025 | A member of Dicranales sensu lato. | |

==== Hypnodendrales ====
| Family | Genus | Species | Authority | Year described | Notes | image |
|---|---|---|---|---|---|---|
| Incertae sedis | †Vetiplanaxis | †Vetiplanaxis espinosus | Hedenäs, Heinrichs, & Schmidt | 2014 | A hypnodendralean moss | |
| Incertae sedis | †Vetiplanaxis | †Vetiplanaxis longiacuminatus | Hedenäs, Heinrichs, & Schmidt | 2014 | A hypnodendralean moss | |
| Incertae sedis | †Vetiplanaxis | †Vetiplanaxis oblongus | Hedenäs, Heinrichs, & Schmidt | 2014 | A hypnodendralean moss | |
| Incertae sedis | †Vetiplanaxis | †Vetiplanaxis obtusus | Li et al. | 2022 | A hypnodendralean moss | |
| Incertae sedis | †Vetiplanaxis | †Vetiplanaxis pyrrhobryoides | Bell | 2007 | A hypnodendralean moss | |

=== Lycopods and spike mosses ===
| Family | Genus | Species | Authority | Year described | Notes | image |
|---|---|---|---|---|---|---|
| Selaginellaceae | Selaginella | †Selaginella alata | Li & Wang | 2022 | A clubmoss | |
| Selaginellaceae | Selaginella | †Selaginella amplexicaulis | A. R. Schmidt & L. Regalado | 2022 | A clubmoss of uncertain subgenus affiliation | Selaginella amplexicaulis |
| Selaginellaceae | Selaginella | †Selaginella aurita | A. R. Schmidt & L. Regalado | 2022 | A clubmoss of uncertain subgenus affiliation | Selaginella aurita |
| Selaginellaceae | Selaginella | †Selaginella ciliifera | A. R. Schmidt & L. Regalado | 2022 | A Selaginella subg. Stachygynandrum clubmoss | Selaginella ciliifera |
| Selaginellaceae | Selaginella | †Selaginella cretacea | Li et al. | 2022 | A Selaginella subg. Stachygynandrum clubmoss | Selaginella cretacea |
| Selaginellaceae | Selaginella | †Selaginella grimaldii | A. R. Schmidt & L. Regalado | 2022 | A Selaginella subg. Stachygynandrum clubmoss | Selaginella grimaldii |
| Selaginellaceae | Selaginella | †Selaginella heinrichsii | A. R. Schmidt & L. Regalado | 2022 | A clubmoss of uncertain subgenus affiliation | Selaginella heinrichsii |
| Selaginellaceae | Selaginella | †Selaginella heterosporangiata | A. R. Schmidt & L. Regalado | 2022 | A Selaginella subg. Stachygynandrum clubmoss | Selaginella heterosporangiata |
| Selaginellaceae | Selaginella | †Selaginella isophylla | A. R. Schmidt & L. Regalado | 2022 | A Selaginella subg. Ericetorum clubmoss | Selaginella isophylla |
| Selaginellaceae | Selaginella | †Selaginella konijnenburgiae | A. R. Schmidt & L. Regalado | 2022 | A clubmoss of uncertain subgenus affiliation | Selaginella konijnenburgiae |
| Selaginellaceae | Selaginella | †Selaginella longifimbriata | A. R. Schmidt & L. Regalado | 2022 | A Selaginella subg. Stachygynandrum clubmoss | Selaginella longifimbriata |
| Selaginellaceae | Selaginella | †Selaginella minutissima | A. R. Schmidt & L. Regalado | 2022 | A Selaginella subg. Stachygynandrum clubmoss | Selaginella minutissima |
| Selaginellaceae | Selaginella | †Selaginella obscura | A. R. Schmidt & L. Regalado | 2022 | A clubmoss of uncertain subgenus affiliation | Selaginella obscura |
| Selaginellaceae | Selaginella | †Selaginella ohlhoffiorum | A. R. Schmidt & L. Regalado | 2022 | A Selaginella subg. Stachygynandrum clubmoss | Selaginella ohlhoffiorum |
| Selaginellaceae | Selaginella | †Selaginella ovoidea | A. R. Schmidt & L. Regalado | 2022 | A clubmoss of uncertain subgenus affiliation | Selaginella ovoidea |
| Selaginellaceae | Selaginella | †Selaginella patrickmuelleri | A. R. Schmidt & L. Regalado | 2022 | A Selaginella subg. Stachygynandrum clubmoss | Selaginella patrickmuelleri |
| Selaginellaceae | Selaginella | †Selaginella pellucida | A. R. Schmidt & L. Regalado | 2022 | A clubmoss of uncertain subgenus affiliation | Selaginella pellucida |
| Selaginellaceae | Selaginella | †Selaginella tomescui | A. R. Schmidt & L. Regalado | 2022 | A clubmoss of uncertain subgenus affiliation | |
| Selaginellaceae | Selaginella | †Selaginella villosa | A. R. Schmidt & L. Regalado | 2022 | A Selaginella subg. Stachygynandrum clubmoss | Selaginella villosa |
| Selaginellaceae | Selaginella | †Selaginella wangboi | A. R. Schmidt & L. Regalado | 2022 | A clubmoss of uncertain subgenus affiliation | Selaginella wangboi |
| Selaginellaceae | Selaginella | †Selaginella wangxinii | A. R. Schmidt & L. Regalado | 2022 | A Selaginella subg. Stachygynandrum clubmoss | Selaginella wangxinii |
| Selaginellaceae | Selaginella | †Selaginella wunderlichiana | A. R. Schmidt & L. Regalado | 2022 | A Selaginella subg. Ericetorum clubmoss | Selaginella wunderlichiana |

=== Marchantiophyte liverworts ===
==== Porellales ====
| Family | Genus | Species | Authority | Year described | Notes | image |
|---|---|---|---|---|---|---|
| Frullaniaceae | Frullania | †Frullania baerlocheri | Heinrichs et al. | 2011 | A frullaniacious liverwort. Frullania pinnata (2017) deemed a jr synonym. | |
| Frullaniaceae | Frullania | Frullania cretacea | Hentschel, Schmidt & Heinrichs | 2009 | A frullaniacious liverwort | |
| Frullaniaceae | Frullania | Frullania kachinensis | Li et al. | 2021 | A frullaniacious liverwort | |
| Frullaniaceae | Frullania | Frullania partita | Li et al. | 2020 | A frullaniacious liverwort | |
| Frullaniaceae | †Protofrullania | †Protofrullania cornigera | Heinrichs | 2017 | A frullaniacious liverwort | |
| Lepidolaenaceae | †Gackstroemia | †Gackstroemia cretacea | Heinrichs, Schäfer-Verwimp, Feldberg, & A.R. Schmidt | 2017 | A lepidolaenacious liverwort | |
| Radulaceae | Radula | †Radula cretacea | Bechteler, Renner, Schäfer-Verwimp, & Heinrichs | 2017 | A Radulaceae liverwort | Radula cretacea |
| Radulaceae | Radula | †Radula heinrichsii | Feldberg et al. | 2021 | A radulaceous liverwort | |
| Radulaceae | Radula | †Radula patrickmuelleri | Feldberg, Schäfer-Verwimp & Renner | 2022 | A radulaceous liverwort | |
| Radulaceae | Radula | †Radula tanaiensis | Feldberg, Schäfer-Verwimp & Renner | 2022 | A radulaceous liverwort | |

=== Polypodiopsid ferns ===
==== Cyatheales ====
| Family | Genus | Species | Authority | Year described | Notes | image |
|---|---|---|---|---|---|---|
| Thyrsopteridaceae | Thyrsopteris | †Thyrsopteris cretacea | Li et al. | 2020 | A thyrsopteridacious tree-fern | |
| Thyrsopteridaceae | Thyrsopteris | †Thyrsopteris cyathindusia | Zhang et al. | 2021 | A thyrsopteridacious tree-fern | |

==== Polypodiales ====
| Family | Genus | Species | Authority | Year described | Notes | image |
|---|---|---|---|---|---|---|
| Cystodiaceae | Cystodium | †Cystodium sorbifolioides | Regalado et al. | 2017 | A Cystodiacious fern | Cystodium sorbifolioides |
| Dennstaedtiaceae | †Cladarastega | †Cladarastega burmanica | Poinar | 2021 | A dennstaedtiaceous fern | |
| Dennstaedtiaceae | †Krameropteris | Krameropteris calophyllum | Li in Li & Meng | 2025 | A dennstaedtiacious fern | |
| Dennstaedtiaceae | †Krameropteris | Krameropteris resinatus | Schneider, Smith, & Heinrichs | 2016 | A dennstaedtiacious fern | |
| Dennstaedtiaceae | Microlepia | †Microlepia burmasia | Long, Wang & Shi in Long et al. | 2022 | A species of Microlepia. | |
| Hymenophyllaceae | †Hymenophyllites | †Hymenophyllites angustus | Li & Wang | 2022 | A filmy fern | |
| Hymenophyllaceae | †Hymenophyllites | †Hymenophyllites kachinensis | Li & Wang | 2022 | A filmy fern | |
| Hymenophyllaceae | †Hymenophyllites | †Hymenophyllites setosus | Li & Wang | 2022 | A filmy fern | |
| Lindsaeaceae | †Proodontosoria | †Proodontosoria myanmarensis | Li et al. | 2020 | A lindsaeacious fern | |
| Marsileaceae | †Marsileaceaephyllum | †Marsileaceaephyllum ciliatum | Wang et al. | 2021 | A marsileaceous fern. | |
| Pteridaceae | †Heinrichsia | †Heinrichsia cheilanthoides | Regalado, Schmidt, Krings & Schneider | 2019 | A pteridacious fern | |
| Incertae sedis | †Cretacifilix | †Cretacifilix fungiformis | Poinar & Buckley | 2008 | A eupolypod fern | |
| Incertae sedis | †Holttumopteris | †Holttumopteris burmensis | Regalado, Schneider, Krings, & Heinrichs | 2018 | A fern of uncertain placement | |

=== Angiosperm flowering plants ===
==== Cornales ====
| Family | Genus | Species | Authority | Year described | Notes | image |
|---|---|---|---|---|---|---|
| Cornaceae | †Eoëpigynia | Eoëpigynia burmensis | Poinar, Chamber & Buckley | 2007 | A cornalean flower | |
| Nyssaceae | †Nyssapollenites | Sp. | N/A | 2019 | A nyssaceous pollen morphotype | |

==== Ericales ====
| Family | Genus | Species | Authority | Year described | Notes | image |
|---|---|---|---|---|---|---|
| Incertae sedis | †Phantophlebia | †Phantophlebia dicycla | Poinar & Chambers | 2020 | An ericalean flower of uncertain affinities Possibly a myrsinoid Primulaceae taxon. | |

==== Laurales ====
| Family | Genus | Species | Authority | Year described | Notes | image |
|---|---|---|---|---|---|---|
| Atherospermataceae | †Dasykothon | Dasykothon leptomiscus | Poinar & Chambers | 2020 | A lauralean flowering plant of uncertain phylogenetic placement. | |
| Hernandiaceae | †Zygadelphus | †Zygadelphus aetheus | Poinar & Chambers | 2019 | A possible lauralian of uncertain phylogenetic placement | |
| Lauraceae | †Cascolaurus | †Cascolaurus burmitis | Poinar | 2017 | A lauracious angiosperm | |
| Monimiaceae | †Palaeoanthella | †Palaeoanthella huangii | Poinar & Chambers | 2005 | A possible monimiacious angiosperm | |
| Monimiaceae | †Setitheca | †Setitheca lativalva | Poinar & Chambers | 2018 | A possible monimiacious angiosperm | |
| Monimiaceae | †Thymolepis | †Thymolepis toxandra | Chambers & Poinar | 2020 | A possible monimiacious angiosperm | |
| Monimiaceae | †Valviloculus | †Valviloculus pleristaminis | Poinar et al. | 2020 | A possible monimiacious angiosperm | |
| Incertae sedis | †Cyathitepala | †Cyathitepala papillosa | Poinar & Chambers | 2020 | A lauralean angiosperm of uncertain affinity | |
| Incertae sedis | †Dispariflora | †Dispariflora robertae | Poinar & Chambers | 2019 | A possible lauralean flower | |
| Incertae sedis | †Jamesrosea | Jamesrosea burmensis | Crepet et al. | 2016 | A mosaic laralean genus | |

==== Liliales ====
| Family | Genus | Species | Authority | Year described | Notes | image |
|---|---|---|---|---|---|---|
| Liliaceae | †Mirafloris | †Mirafloris burmitis | Poinar | 2021 | A lilialean flower. | |

==== Nymphaeales ====
| Family | Genus | Species | Authority | Year described | Notes | image |
|---|---|---|---|---|---|---|
| Nymphaeaceae | †Praenymphaeapollenites | †Praenymphaeapollenites cenomaniensis | Barrón, Peris & Labandeira | 2020 | Pollen of a member of Nymphaeaceae. | Praenymphaeapollenites cenomaniensis |

==== Oxalidales ====
| Family | Genus | Species | Authority | Year described | Notes | image |
|---|---|---|---|---|---|---|
| Cunoniaceae | †Tropidogyne | †Tropidogyne euthystyla | Poinar, Chambers & Vega | 2021 | A small flowered cunoniacious angiosperm. | |
| Cunoniaceae | †Tropidogyne | †Tropidogyne lobodisca | Poinar & Chambers | 2019 | A cunoniacious angiosperm. | |
| Cunoniaceae | †Tropidogyne | †Tropidogyne pentaptera | Poinar & Chambers | 2017 | A cunoniacious angiosperm. | |
| Cunoniaceae | †Tropidogyne | †Tropidogyne pikei | Chambers, Poinar & Buckley | 2010 | A cunoniacious angiosperm. | |
| Incertae sedis | †Lachnociona | †Lachnociona camptostylus | Poinar & Chambers | 2018 | An oxalidalean angiosperm of uncertain affinity | |
| Incertae sedis | †Lachnociona | †Lachnociona terriae | Poinar, Chambers & Buckley | 2008 | An oxalidalean angiosperm of uncertain affinity | |

==== Poales ====
| family | Genus | Species | Authority | Year described | Notes | image |
|---|---|---|---|---|---|---|
| Poaceae | †Programinis | †Programinis burmitis | Poinar | 2004 | A poalean of uncertain placement | |
| Poaceae | †Programinis | Programinis laminatus | Poinar | 2004 | A poalean of uncertain placement | |

==== Rosales ====
| Family | Genus | Species | Authority | Year described | Notes | image |
|---|---|---|---|---|---|---|
| Rhamnaceae | †Eophylica | †Eophylica priscastellata | Shi et al. | 2022 | A rhamnaceous floral morphotaxon Electrophycus astroplethus Deemed a jr synonym | |
| Rhamnaceae | Phylica | †Phylica piloburmensis | Shi et al. | 2022 | A rhamnaceous floral morphotaxon. | |

==== Incertae sedis ====
| Genus | Species | Authority | Year described | Notes | image |
|---|---|---|---|---|---|
| †Antiquifloris | †Antiquifloris latifibris | Poinar, Buckley & Chen | 2016 | An angiosperm of uncertain placement | Antiquifloris latifibris |
| †Chainandra | †Chainandra zeugostylus | Poinar & Chambers | 2020 | An angiosperm of uncertain placement | |
| †Chenocybus | †Chenocybus allodapus | Poinar | 2018 | An angiosperm of uncertain placement | |
| †Exalloanthum | ↑Exalloanthum burmense | Poinar | 2018 | An angiosperm of uncertain placement, originally named Diaphoranthus burmensis | |
| †Lijinganthus | †Lijinganthus revoluta | Liu et al. | 2018 | A core eudicot of uncertain placement | Lijinganthus revoluta |
| †Micropetasos | †Micropetasos burmensis | Poinar, Chambers, & Wunderlich | 2004 | An angiosperm of uncertain placement | |
| †Rasenganus | †Rasenganus auricularus | Xing & Gu | 2020 | A possible epizoochorous fruit. | |
| †Strombothelya | †Strombothelya monostyla | Poinar & Chambers | 2019 | An angiosperm of uncertain phylogenetic placement | |
| †Strombothelya | †Strombothelya grammogyna | Poinar & Chambers | 2019 | An angiosperm of uncertain phylogenetic placement | |

== Fungi ==
=== Ascomycota ===
==== Hypocreales ====
| Family | Genus | Species | Authority | Year described | Notes | image |
|---|---|---|---|---|---|---|
| Clavicipitaceae | †Palaeoclaviceps | †Palaeoclaviceps parasiticus | Poinar, Alderman & Wunderlich | 2015 | An ergot | |
| Ophiocordycipitaceae | †Paleoophiocordyceps | †Paleoophiocordyceps coccophagus | Sung, Poinar & Spatafora | 2008 | A parasite of a scale insect | |
| Incertae sedis | †Entropezites | †Entropezites patricii | Poinar & Buckley | 2007 | A hypermycoparasitic fungus | |
| Incertae sedis | †Mycetophagites | †Mycetophagites atrebora | Poinar & Buckley | 2007 | A hypermycoparasitic fungus | |

==== Ophiostomatales ====
| Family | Genus | Species | Authority | Year described | Notes | image |
|---|---|---|---|---|---|---|
| Ophiostomataceae | †Paleoambrosia | †Paleoambrosia entomophila | Poinar & Vega | 2018 | An ambrosia fungus associated with Palaeotylus femoralis. | Paleoambrosia entomophila |

=== Basidiomycota ===
==== Agaricales ====
| Family | Genus | Species | Authority | Year described | Notes | image |
|---|---|---|---|---|---|---|
| Incertae sedis | †Palaeoagaracites | †Palaeoagaracites antiquus | Poinar & Buckley | 2007 | An agaric of uncertain placement within the Agaricales | Palaeoagaracites antiquus |

==== Boletales ====
| Family | Genus | Species | Authority | Year described | Notes | image |
|---|---|---|---|---|---|---|
| Sclerodermataceae | †Palaeogaster | †Palaeogaster micromorpha | Poinar, Alfredo & Baseia | 2014 | A gasteroid fungus belonging to the Boletales | Palaeogaster micromorpha |

==== incertae sedis ====
| Family | Genus | Species | Authority | Year described | Notes | image |
|---|---|---|---|---|---|---|
| Spheciophilaceae | †Philothysanus | †Philothysanus burmanicus | Poinar | 2021 | An ectoparasitic fungus | |
| Spheciophilaceae | †Spheciophila | †Spheciophila adercia | Poinar | 2016 | An ectoparasitic fungus | Spheciophila adercia |
| Incertae sedis | †Palaeomycus | †Palaeomycus epallelus | Poinar | 2018 | A fungus belonging to the Pezizomycotina | |

=== Rozellomycota ===
==== Microsporidia ====
| Family | Genus | Species | Authority | Year described | Notes | image |
|---|---|---|---|---|---|---|
| Incertae sedis | Microsporidium | †Microsporidium burmanicum | Poinar | 2019 | A microsporidian fungus | |

=== "Zygomycetes" ===
==== Priscadvenales ====
| Family | Genus | Species | Authority | Year described | Notes | image |
|---|---|---|---|---|---|---|
| †Priscadvenaceae | †Priscadvena | †Priscadvena corymbosa | Poinar & Vega | 2019 | A trichomycete | Priscadvena corymbosa |

== Echinodermata ==
=== Crinoidea ===
==== Isocrinida ====
| Family | Genus | Species | Authority | Year described | Notes | image |
|---|---|---|---|---|---|---|
| Isocrinidae | Isocrinus | †Isocrinus cf. legeri | Salamon et al. | 2019 | An Isocrinid crinoid, described from ossicles encased in the resin | |

== Arthropoda ==
=== Arachnida ===
==== Amblypygi ====
| Family | Genus | Species | Authority | Year described | Notes | image |
|---|---|---|---|---|---|---|
| Incertae sedis | †Burmacharon | †Burmacharon dunlopi | Hu et al. | 2020 | | Burmacharon dunlopi |
| Incertae sedis | †Kronocharon | †Kronocharon engeli | Wunderlich | 2015 | A tailless whip scorpion of uncertain placement. | Kronocharon engeli |
| Incertae sedis | †Kronocharon | †Kronocharon longicalcaris | Wunderlich | 2015 | A tailless whip scorpion of uncertain placement. | Kronocharon longicalcaris |
| Incertae sedis | †Kronocharon | †Kronocharon prendinii | Rossi & Merendino | 2016 | A tailless whip scorpion of uncertain placement. One subspecies described K. p. adornellae | Kronocharon prendinii |

==== Araneae ====
| Family | Genus | Species | Authority | Year described | Notes | image |
|---|---|---|---|---|---|---|
| †Aliendiguetidae | Aliendiguetia | †Aliendiguetia praecursor | Wunderlich & Müller | 2020 | An aliendiguetid spider of uncertain affinities Possibly related to the Ochyroceratoidea. | |
| †Alteruloboridae | †Alteruloborus | †Alteruloborus araneoides | Wunderlich in Wunderlich & Müller | 2018 | An alteruloborid spider. | |
| Archaeidae | †Burmesarchaea | †Burmesarchaea alissa | Wunderlich | 2017 | An archaeid spider | |
| Archaeidae | †Burmesarchaea | †Burmesarchaea bilongapophyses | Wunderlich & Müller | 2020 | An archaeid spider. | |
| Archaeidae | †Burmesarchaea | †Burmesarchaea caudata | Wunderlich | 2017 | An archaeid spider | |
| Archaeidae | †Burmesarchaea | †Burmesarchaea crassicaput | Wunderlich | 2017 | An archaeid spider | |
| Archaeidae | †Burmesarchaea | †Burmesarchaea crassichelae | Wunderlich | 2017 | An archaeid spider | |
| Archaeidae | †Burmesarchaea | †Burmesarchaea gibber | Wunderlich | 2017 | An archaeid spider | |
| Archaeidae | †Burmesarchaea | †Burmesarchaea gibberoides | Wunderlich | 2017 | An archaeid spider | |
| Archaeidae | †Burmesarchaea | †Burmesarchaea gibbosa | Wunderlich | 2017 | An archaeid spider | |
| Archaeidae | †Burmesarchaea | †Burmesarchaea grimaldii | (Penny) | 2003 | An archaeid spider, originally described as Afrarchaea grimaldii | |
| Archaeidae | †Burmesarchaea | †Burmesarchaea longicollum | Wunderlich | 2017 | An archaeid spider | |
| Archaeidae | †Burmesarchaea | †Burmesarchaea propinqua | Wunderlich | 2017 | An archaeid spider | |
| Archaeidae | †Burmesarchaea | †Burmesarchaea pseudogibber | Wunderlich | 2017 | An archaeid spider | |
| Archaeidae | †Burmesarchaea | †Burmesarchaea pustulata | Wunderlich | 2017 | An archaeid spider | |
| Archaeidae | †Burmesarchaea | †Burmesarchaea quadrata | Wunderlich | 2017 | An archaeid spider | |
| Archaeidae | †Burmesarchaea | †Burmesarchaea speciosa | (Wunderlich) | 2008 | An archaeid spider, Originally described as Lacunauchenius speciosus. | |
| Archaeidae | †Eomysmauchenius | †Eomysmauchenius cretaceominimus | Peng et al. | 2023 | A planarchaeid palpimanoid spider. | |
| Archaeidae | †Eomysmauchenius | †Eomysmauchenius dubius | Wunderlich | 2017 | A planarchaeid palpimanoid spider. | |
| Archaeidae | †Eomysmauchenius | †Eomysmauchenius ovata | (Wunderlich) | 2017 | A planarchaeid palpimanoid spider, originally Planarchaea ovata | |
| Archaeidae | †Eomysmauchenius | Eomysmauchenius septentrionalis | Wunderlich | 2008 | A planarchaeid palpimanoid spider | |
| Archaeidae | †Spiniarchaea | †Spiniarchaea aberrans | Wunderlich in Wunderlich & Müller | 2021 | An archaeid spider. | |
| †Burmascutidae | †Burmascutum | †Burmascutum aenigma | Wunderlich | 2008 | A burmascutid spider. | |
| †Burmascutidae | †Burmascutum | †Burmascutum brevis | Wunderlich | 2018 | A burmascutid spider. | |
| †Burmathelidae | †Burmathele | †Burmathele biseriata | Wunderlich | 2017 | A burmathelid mesothele spider. | |
| †Burmorsolidae | †Burmorsolus | Burmorsolus crassus | Wunderlich | 2015 | Transferred to the separate genus Pseudorsolus in 2017, but moved back to the genus Burmorsolus in 2020. | |
| †Burmorsolidae | †Burmorsolus | Burmorsolus curvatus | (Wunderlich) | 2017 | Originally described as "Loxoderces" curvatus. | |
| †Burmorsolidae | †Burmorsolus | Burmorsolus globosus | Wunderlich & Müller | 2020 | | |
| †Burmorsolidae | †Burmorsolus | Burmorsolus longembolus | Wunderlich & Müller | 2020 | | |
| †Burmorsolidae | †Burmorsolus | Burmorsolus longibulbus | Wunderlich & Müller | 2020 | | |
| †Burmorsolidae | †Burmorsolus | Burmorsolus longicymbium | (Wunderlich) | 2017 | Originally described as "Loxoderces" longicymbium. | |
| †Burmorsolidae | †Burmorsolus | Burmorsolus longitibia | Wunderlich in Wunderlich & Müller | 2021 | | |
| †Burmorsolidae | †Burmorsolus | Burmorsolus nonplumosus | Wunderlich | 2015 | Probably a relative of trogloraptorids. | |
| †Burmorsolidae | †Burmorsolus | Burmorsolus rectus | (Wunderlich) | 2017 | Originally described as "Loxoderces" rectus. | |
| †Crassicephalidae | †Crassicephalus | †Crassicephalus parvibulbus | Wunderlich in Wunderlich & Müller | 2021 | A Deinopoidean spider. | |
| †Cretaceothelidae | †Cretaceothele | †Cretaceothele lata | Wunderlich | 2015 | A cretaceothelid Mesothelaen spider. | |
| †Cretamysmenidae | †Cretamysmena | †Cretamysmena fontana | Wunderlich in Wunderlich & Müller | 2018 | A cretamysmenid spider. | |
| Ctenizidae | †Parvocteniza | †Parvocteniza parvula | Wunderlich & Müller | 2020 | A ctenizid spider. | |
| Dipluridae? | †Alterphyxioschemoides | †Alterphyxioschemoides spicula | Wunderlich in Wunderlich & Müller | 2021 | A possible curtain-web spider. | |
| Dipluridae? | †Phyxioschemoides | †Phyxioschemoides collembola | Wunderlich | 2015 | A spider of uncertain affinities, originally described as a curtain-web spider. | |
| †Dubiodeinopsidae | †Dubiodeinopsis | †Dubiodeinopsis spinifemora | Wunderlich in Wunderlich & Müller | 2021 | A deinopoidean spider. | |
| †Dubiouloboridae | †Dubiouloborix | †Dubiouloborix incompletus | Wunderlich in Wunderlich & Müller | 2021 | A deinopoidean spider. | |
| †Dubiouloboridae | †Dubiouloborus | †Dubiouloborus praeta | Wunderlich in Wunderlich & Müller | 2021 | A deinopoidean spider. | |
| †Dubiouloboridae | †Dubiouloborus | †Dubiouloborus procerembolus | Wunderlich in Wunderlich & Müller | 2021 | A deinopoidean spider. | |
| †Eodeinopidae | †Deinopedes | †Deinopedes tranquillus | Wunderlich | 2017 | An eodeinopid deinopoid spider. | |
| †Eodeinopidae | †Eodeinopis | †Eodeinopis longipes | Wunderlich | 2017 | An eodeinopid deinopoid spider. | |
| †Eomesothelidae | †Eomesothele | †Eomesothele noninclinata | Wunderlich | 2019 | An eomesothelid spider. | |
| †Eomesothelidae | †Intermesothele | †Intermesothele pulcher | Wunderlich | 2019 | An eomesothelid spider. | |
| †Eopsilodercidae | †Eopsiloderces | †Eopsiloderces filiformis | (Wunderlich) | (2012) | An eopsilodercid spider. Originally described as "Psiloderces" filiformis. | |
| †Eopsilodercidae | †Eopsiloderces | Eopsiloderces loxosceloides | Wunderlich | 2008 | An eopsilodercid spider. | |
| †Eopsilodercidae | †Eopsiloderces | Eopsiloderces serenitas | Wunderlich | 2015 | An eopsilodercid spider. | |
| †Eopsilodercidae | †Propterpsiloderces | †Propterpsiloderces crassitibia | Wunderlich & Müller | 2020 | An eopsilodercid spider. | |
| †Eopsilodercidae | †Propterpsiloderces | †Propterpsiloderces cymbioseta | Wunderlich & Müller | 2020 | An eopsilodercid spider. | |
| †Eopsilodercidae | †Propterpsiloderces | †Propterpsiloderces duplex | Wunderlich & Müller | 2020 | An eopsilodercid spider. | |
| †Eopsilodercidae | †Propterpsiloderces | †Propterpsiloderces longisetae | Wunderlich | 2015 | An eopsilodercid spider. | |
| †Eopsilodercidae | †Propterpsiloderces | †Propterpsiloderces similis | Wunderlich in Wunderlich & Müller | 2021 | An eopsilodercid spider. | |
| †Eotibiaapophysidae | †Eoagelenomorphus | †Eoagelenomorphus cretaceus | Wunderlich in Wunderlich & Müller | 2021 | A spider of uncertain phylogenetic placement Possibly an early branch of the RTA clade. | |
| †Eotibiaapophysidae | †Eotibiaapophysis | †Eotibiaapophysis reliquus | Wunderlich in Wunderlich & Müller | 2018 | A spider of uncertain phylogenetic placement Possibly an early branch of the RTA clade. | |
| †Fossilcalcaridae | †Fossilcalcar | †Fossilcalcar praeteritus | Wunderlich | 2015 | A fossilcalcarid mygalomorph spider. | |
| †Frateruloboridae | †Frateruloborus | †Frateruloborus bulbosus | Wunderlich in Wunderlich & Müller | 2018 | A frateruloborid spider. | |
| †Gigarachnidae | †Gigarachne | †Gigarachne bian | Jiang & Li in Jiang et al. | 2020 | An Araneomorphae of uncertain affinity. | |
| Hersiliidae | †Breviscauda | †Breviscauda translucens | Wunderlich | 2024 | A tree trunk spider. | |
| Hersiliidae | †Burmesiola | †Burmesiola cretacea | Wunderlich | 2011 | A tree trunk spider. | |
| Hersiliidae | †Burmesiola | †Burmesiola daviesi | Wunderlich | 2015 | A tree trunk spider. | |
| Hersiliidae | †Burmesiola | †?Burmesiola kachinensis | Wunderlich & Müller | 2020 | A tree trunk spider. | |
| Hersiliidae | †Spinasilia | †Spinasilia dissoluta | Wunderlich | 2015 | A tree trunk spider. | |
| †Lagonomegopidae | †Albiburmops | †Albiburmops annulipes | Wunderlich | 2017 | A lagonomegopid spider | |
| †Lagonomegopidae | †Archaelagonops | †Archaelagonops propinquus | Wunderlich | 2015 | A lagonomegopid spider. | |
| †Lagonomegopidae | †Archaelagonops | †Archaelagonops salticoides | Wunderlich | 2012 | A lagonomegopid spider. | |
| †Lagonomegopidae | †Archaelagonops | †Archaelagonops scorsum | Wunderlich | 2015 | A lagonomegopid spider. | |
| †Lagonomegopidae | †Burlagonomegops | †Burlagonomegops eskovi | Penny | 2005 | A Lagonomegopid spider | |
| †Lagonomegopidae | †Cymbiolagonops | †Cymbiolagonops cymbiocalcar | Wunderlich | 2015 | A lagonomegopid spider. | |
| †Lagonomegopidae | †Hiatomegops | †Hiatomegops spinalis | Guo, Selden & Ren | 2021 | A lagonomegopid spider | |
| †Lagonomegopidae | †Lagonoburmops | †Lagonoburmops plumosus | Wunderlich | 2012 | A lagonomegopid spider. | |
| †Lagonomegopidae | †Lagonoburmops | †?Lagonomegops tuber | Wunderlich | 2015 | A lagonomegopid spider of uncertain generic placement. | |
| †Lagonomegopidae | †Lineaburmops | †Lineaburmops beigeli | Wunderlich | 2015 | A lagonomegopid spider. | |
| †Lagonomegopidae | †Lineaburmops | †Lineaburmops hirsutipes | Wunderlich | 2015 | A lagonomegopid spider. | |
| †Lagonomegopidae | †Lineaburmops | †Lineaburmops longiantepes | Guo, Selden & Ren in Guo et al. | 2024 | A lagonomegopid spider. | |
| †Lagonomegopidae | †Lineaburmops | †Lineaburmops maculatus | Wunderlich | 2017 | A lagonomegopid spider. | |
| †Lagonomegopidae | †Lineaburmops | †Lineaburmops rhombus | Guo et al. | 2024 | A lagonomegopid spider. | |
| †Lagonomegopidae | †Myanlagonops | †Myanlagonops gracilipes | Wunderlich | 2012 | A Lagonomegopid spider. | |
| †Lagonomegopidae | †Odontomegops | †Odontomegops titan | Guo et al. | 2020 | A lagonomegopid spider | |
| †Lagonomegopidae | †Parviburmops | †Parviburmops? bigibber | Wunderlich | 2017 | A possible lagonomegopid spider. | |
| †Lagonomegopidae | †Parviburmops | †Parviburmops brevipalpus | Wunderlich | 2015 | A lagonomegopid spider. | |
| †Lagonomegopidae | †Paxillomegops | †?Paxillomegops brevipes | Wunderlich | 2015 | A lagonomegopid spider of uncertain generic placement. | |
| †Lagonomegopidae | †Paxillomegops | ?Paxillomegops cornutus | Wunderlich | 2017 | A lagonomegopid spider of uncertain generic placement. | |
| †Lagonomegopidae | †Paxillomegops | Paxillomegops longipes | Wunderlich | 2015 | A lagonomegopid spider. | |
| †Lagonomegopidae | †Picturmegops | †Picturmegops signatus | Wunderlich | 2015 | A lagonomegopid spider. | |
| †Lagonomegopidae | †Planimegops | †Planimegops parvus | Wunderlich | 2017 | A lagonomegopid spider. | |
| †Lagonomegopidae | †Scopomegops | †Scopomegops fax | Guo, Selden & Ren | 2021 | A lagonomegopid spider | |
| †Leviunguidae | †Leviunguis | †Leviunguis altus | Wunderlich in Wunderlich & Müller | 2018 | A leviunguid spider. | |
| †Leviunguidae | †Leviunguis | †Leviunguis anulus | Wunderlich in Wunderlich & Müller | 2018 | A leviunguid spider. | |
| †Leviunguidae | †Leviunguis | †Leviunguis anulusoides | Wunderlich in Wunderlich & Müller | 2018 | A leviunguid spider. | |
| †Leviunguidae | †Leviunguis | †Leviunguis bruckschi | Wunderlich | 2012 | A leviunguid spider. | |
| †Leviunguidae | †Leviunguis | †Leviunguis bruckschoides | Wunderlich in Wunderlich & Müller | 2018 | A leviunguid spider. | |
| †Leviunguidae | †Leviunguis | †Leviunguis erectus | Wunderlich in Wunderlich & Müller | 2018 | A leviunguid spider. | |
| †Leviunguidae | †Leviunguis | †Leviunguis glomulus | Wunderlich in Wunderlich & Müller | 2018 | A leviunguid spider. | |
| †Leviunguidae | †Leviunguis | †Leviunguis glomus | Wunderlich in Wunderlich & Müller | 2018 | A leviunguid spider. | |
| †Leviunguidae | †Leviunguis | †Leviunguis graciliembolus | Wunderlich in Wunderlich & Müller | 2018 | A leviunguid spider. | |
| †Leviunguidae | †Leviunguis | †Leviunguis gradus | Wunderlich in Wunderlich & Müller | 2018 | A leviunguid spider. | |
| †Leviunguidae | †Leviunguis | †Leviunguis porrigens | Wunderlich in Wunderlich & Müller | 2018 | A leviunguid spider. | |
| †Leviunguidae | †Leviunguis | †Leviunguis pseudobruckschi | Wunderlich in Wunderlich & Müller | 2018 | A leviunguid spider. | |
| †Leviunguidae | †Leviunguis | †Leviunguis quadratus | Wunderlich in Wunderlich & Müller | 2018 | A leviunguid spider. | |
| Macrothelidae | †Acanthomacrothele | †Acanthomacrothele geminata | Wang et al. | 2024 | A macrothelid spider. | |
| Macrothelidae | †Acanthomacrothele | †Acanthomacrothele longicaudata | Wang et al. | 2024 | A macrothelid spider. | |
| Macrothelidae | †Acanthomacrothele | †Acanthomacrothele pauciverrucae | Wang et al. | 2024 | A macrothelid spider. | |
| Macrothelidae | †Antemicrothele | †Antemicrothele parva | Wunderlich | 2026 | A member of Hexathelidae sensu lato, possibly a macrothelid. | |
| Macrothelidae | †Promacrothele | †Promacrothele polyacantha | Tang, Engel & Yang | 2023 | A macrothelid spider. | |
| Mecysmaucheniidae | †Palaeozearchaea | †Palaeozearchaea depressa | Wunderlich in Wunderlich & Müller | 2021 | A mecysmaucheniid spider. | |
| †Megasetidae | †Megasetae | †Megasetae colphepeiroides | Wunderlich | 2021 | A megasetid araneomorph spider. | |
| †Megasetidae | †Parvimegasetae | †Parvimegasetae araneoides | Wunderlich | 2023 | A megasetid spider. | |
| †Micropalpimanidae | †Micropalpimanus | †Micropalpimanus gibber | Wunderlich in Wunderlich & Müller | 2021 | A micropalpimanid palpimanoid spider | |
| †Micropalpimanidae | †Micropalpimanus | †Micropalpimanus poinari | Wunderlich | 2008 | A micropalpimanid palpimanoid spider | |
| Mysmenidae? | †Myanmarmysmena | †Myanmarmysmena grandipalpus | Wunderlich | 2023 | A possible mysmenid spider. | |
| †Nanoaenigmatidae | †Nanoaenigma | †Nanoaenigma pumilio | Wunderlich | 2023 | A nanoaenigmatid araneoid spider. | |
| Nemesiidae | †Burmesiana | †Burmesiana sordida | (Wunderlich & Müller) | 2020 | A member of the family Nemesiidae originally described as Burmesia sordida. | |
| Nemesiidae | †Cethegoides | †Cethegoides patricki | Wunderlich | 2017 | A member of the family Nemesiidae; First described as a curtain-web spider. | |
| Nemesiidae | †Myannemesia | †Myannemesia glaber | Wunderlich & Müller | 2020 | A member of the family Nemesiidae. | |
| Nephilidae | Nephila | †Nephila burmanica | Poinar | 2012 | A nephiline spider Originally described as "Geratonephila" burmanica | Nephila burmanica |
| Oecobiidae | †Retrooecobius | †"Retrooecobius" chomskyi | Wunderlich | 2015 | A disc web spider. | |
| Oecobiidae | †Retrooecobius | †Retrooecobius convexus | Wunderlich | 2015 | A disc web spider. | |
| Oecobiidae | †Retrooecobius | †Retrooecobius lwini | Jiang & Li in Xin et al. | 2022 | A disc web spider. | |
| Oecobiidae | †Zamilia | Zamilia aculeopectens | Wunderlich | 2015 | A disc web spider. | |
| Oecobiidae | †Zamilia | †Zamilia antecessor | Wunderlich | 2008 | A disc web spider. | |
| Oecobiidae | †Zamilia | †Zamilia arkari | Jiang & Li in Xin et al. | 2022 | A disc web spider. | |
| Oecobiidae | †Zamilia | †Zamilia quattuormammillae | Wunderlich | 2015 | A disc web spider. | |
| Oecobiidae | †Zamilia | †Zamilia sheini | Jiang & Li in Xin et al. | 2022 | A disc web spider. | |
| Oecobiidae | †Zamilia | †Zamilia shwayi | Jiang & Li in Xin et al. | 2022 | A disc web spider. | |
| Oonopidae | †Burmorchestina | †Burmorchestina acuminata | Wunderlich | 2017 | A goblin spider. | |
| Oonopidae | †Burmorchestina | †Burmorchestina biangulata | Wunderlich | 2017 | A goblin spider. | |
| Oonopidae | †Burmorchestina | †Burmorchestina bo | Jiang & Li in Xin et al. | 2021 | A goblin spider. | |
| Oonopidae | †Burmorchestina | †Burmorchestina circular | Wunderlich & Müller | 2020 | A goblin spider. | |
| Oonopidae | †Burmorchestina | †Burmorchestina convexa | Jiang & Li in Xin et al. | 2021 | A goblin spider. | |
| Oonopidae | †Burmorchestina | †Burmorchestina plana | Wunderlich | 2017 | A goblin spider. | |
| Oonopidae | †Burmorchestina | †Burmorchestina pulcher | Wunderlich | 2008 | A goblin spider. | |
| Oonopidae | †Burmorchestina | †Burmorchestina pulcheroides | Wunderlich | 2017 | A goblin spider. | |
| Oonopidae | †Burmorchestina | †Burmorchestina tuberosa | Wunderlich | 2017 | A goblin spider. | |
| Oonopidae | Orchestina | †Orchestina globus | Jiang & Li in Xin et al. | 2021 | A goblin spider. | |
| Pacullidae | †Furcembolus | †Furcembolus andersoni | Wunderlich | 2008 | A pacullid spider. | |
| Pacullidae | †Furcembolus | †Furcembolus armatura | (Wunderlich) | 2015 | A pacullid spider. Originally described as "Praeterpaculla" armatura | |
| Pacullidae | †Furcembolus | †Furcembolus biacuta | (Wunderlich) | 2015 | A pacullid spider. Originally described as "Praeterpaculla" biacuta | |
| Pacullidae | †Furcembolus | †Furcembolus chuandiani | Jiang & Li in Xin et al. | 2021 | A pacullid spider. | |
| Pacullidae | †Furcembolus | †Furcembolus crassitibia | Wunderlich | 2017 | A pacullid spider. | |
| Pacullidae | †Furcembolus | †Furcembolus dissolata | (Wunderlich) | 2015 | A pacullid spider. Originally described as "Praeterpaculla" dissolata | |
| Pacullidae | †Furcembolus | †Furcembolus equester | (Wunderlich) | 2015 | A pacullid spider. Originally described as "Praeterpaculla" equester | |
| Pacullidae | †Furcembolus | †Furcembolus fengzheni | Jiang & Li in Xin et al. | 2021 | A pacullid spider. | |
| Pacullidae | †Furcembolus | †Furcembolus grossa | Wunderlich | 2017 | A pacullid spider. | |
| Pacullidae | †Furcembolus | †Furcembolus inzaliae | Jiang & Li in Xin et al. | 2022 | A pacullid spider. | |
| Pacullidae | †Furcembolus | †Furcembolus longior | Wunderlich | 2017 | A pacullid spider. | |
| Pacullidae | †Furcembolus | †Furcembolus martensi | Jiang & Li in Xin et al. | 2021 | A pacullid spider. | |
| Pacullidae | †Furcembolus | †Furcembolus tuberosa | (Wunderlich) | 2015 | A pacullid spider. Originally described as "Praeterpaculla" tuberosa | |
| †Parvithelidae | †Parvithele | †Parvithele muelleri | Wunderlich | 2017 | A parvithelid mesothelaen spider. | |
| †Parvithelidae | †Parvithele | †Parvithele spinipes | Wunderlich | 2017 | A parvithelid mesothelaen spider. | |
| †Parvithelidae | †Pulvillothele | †Pulvillothele haupti | Wunderlich | 2017 | A parvithelid mesothelaen spider. | |
| †Parvosegestriidae | †Parvosegestria | Parvosegestria caederens | Wunderlich | 2015 | A tube-dwelling spider, a member of the stem group of Segestriidae or a stem dysderoid. First named as Myansegestria caederens | |
| †Parvosegestriidae | †Parvosegestria | Parvosegestria elegans | Wunderlich | 2024 | A tube-dwelling spider, a member of the stem group of Segestriidae or a stem dysderoid. | |
| †Parvosegestriidae | †Parvosegestria | Parvosegestria engin | Wunderlich | 2015 | A tube-dwelling spider, a member of the stem group of Segestriidae or a stem dysderoid. First named as Myansegestria engin | |
| †Parvosegestriidae | †Parvosegestria | Parvosegestria longitibialis | Wunderlich | 2015 | A tube-dwelling spider, a member of the stem group of Segestriidae or a stem dysderoid. | |
| †Parvosegestriidae | †Parvosegestria | Parvosegestria obscura | Wunderlich | 2015 | A tube-dwelling spider, a member of the stem group of Segestriidae or a stem dysderoid. | |
| †Parvosegestriidae | †Parvosegestria | Parvosegestria pintgu | Wunderlich | 2015 | A tube-dwelling spider, a member of the stem group of Segestriidae or a stem dysderoid. | |
| †Parvosegestriidae | †Parvosegestria | Parvosegestria rugosa | (Wunderlich) | 2015 | A tube-dwelling spider, a member of the stem group of Segestriidae or a stem dysderoid. Originally described as "Denticulsegestria" rugosa. | |
| †Parvosegestriidae | †Parvosegestria | Parvosegestria triplex | Wunderlich | 2015 | A tube-dwelling spider, a member of the stem group of Segestriidae or a stem dysderoid. | |
| †Pholcochyroceridae | †Autotomiana | †Autotomiana brevisetosa | Wunderlich in Wunderlich & Müller | 2021 | A pholcochyrocerid spider. | |
| †Pholcochyroceridae | †Autotomiana | †Autotomiana hirsutipes | Wunderlich | 2015 | A Pholcochyrocerid spider. | |
| †Pholcochyroceridae | †Autotomiana | †Autotomiana patrickmuelleri | Wunderlich | 2026 | | |
| †Pholcochyroceridae | †Kachinarachne | †Kachinarachne oblonga | Wunderlich in Wunderlich & Müller | 2021 | A pholcochyrocerid spider. | |
| †Pholcochyroceridae | †Longissipalpus | †Longissipalpus albistriatus | Hou et al. | 2024 | | |
| †Pholcochyroceridae | †Longissipalpus | †Longissipalpus aliter | Wunderlich | 2022 | A Mongolarachnid spider. Originally described as Longissipalpus cochlea Wunderlich (2021). | |
| †Pholcochyroceridae | †Longissipalpus | †Longissipalpus cochlea | Wunderlich | 2017 | A Mongolarachnid spider. | |
| †Pholcochyroceridae | †Longissipalpus | †Longissipalpus impudicus | Wunderlich | 2021 | A Mongolarachnid spider. | |
| †Pholcochyroceridae | †Longissipalpus | †Longissipalpus magnus | Wunderlich | 2015 | A Mongolarachnid spider. | |
| †Pholcochyroceridae | †Longissipalpus | †Longissipalpus maior | Wunderlich | 2015 | A Mongolarachnid spider. | |
| †Pholcochyroceridae | †Longissipalpus | †Longissipalpus minor | Wunderlich | 2015 | A Mongolarachnid spider. | |
| †Pholcochyroceridae | †Parvibulbus | †Parvibulbus incompletus | Wunderlich in Wunderlich & Müller | 2018 | A pholcochyrocerid. | |
| †Pholcochyroceridae | †Pedipalparaneus | †Pedipalparaneus protumidus | Hou et al. | 2024 | | |
| †Pholcochyroceridae | †Pedipalparaneus | †Pedipalparaneus seldeni | Wunderlich | 2015 | A Mongolarachnid spider. | |
| †Pholcochyroceridae | †Pholcochyrocer | †Pholcochyrocer altipecten | Wunderlich | 2017 | A pholcochyrocerid spider. | |
| †Pholcochyroceridae | †Pholcochyrocer | †?Pholcochyrocer baculum | Wunderlich | 2012 | A pholcochyrocerid spider of uncertain generic placement | |
| †Pholcochyroceridae | †Pholcochyrocer | †Pholcochyrocer calidum | Wunderlich in Wunderlich & Müller | 2018 | A pholcochyrocerid spider. | |
| †Pholcochyroceridae | †Pholcochyrocer | †Pholcochyrocer guttulaeque | Wunderlich | 2008 | A pholcochyrocerid spider. | |
| †Pholcochyroceridae | †Pholcochyrocer | †Pholcochyrocer pecten | Wunderlich | 2012 | A pholcochyrocerid spider. | |
| †Pholcochyroceridae | †Pholcochyrocer | †Pholcochyrocer vermiculus | Wunderlich in Wunderlich & Müller | 2018 | A pholcochyrocerid spider. | |
| †Pholcochyroceridae | †Spinicreber | †Spinicreber antiquus | Wunderlich | 2015 | A pholcochyrocerid spider. | |
| †Pholcochyroceridae | †Spinicreber | †Spinicreber vacuus | Wunderlich & Müller | 2020 | A pholcochyrocerid spider. | |
| †Pholcochyroceridae | †Spinipalpus | †Spinipalpus vetus | Wunderlich | 2015 | A pholcochyrocerid spider. | |
| †Pilosarachnidae | †Pilosarachne | †Pilosarachne ju | Jiang & Li in Jiang et al. | 2020 | A member of the group Araneomorphae of uncertain affinity possibly a member of Deinopoidea. | |
| †Planarchaeidae | †Planarchaea | †Planarchaea incompleta | Wunderlich in Wunderlich & Müller | 2021 | A planarchaeid palpimanoid spider. | |
| †Planarchaeidae | †Planarchaea | †Planarchaea kopp | Wunderlich | 2015 | A planarchaeid palpimanoid spider. | |
| †Planarchaeidae | †Planarchaea | †Planarchaea longissipes | (Wunderlich) | 2015 | A planarchaeid palpimanoid spider, originally Lacunauchenius longissipes Moved from ?Eomysmauchenius longissipes | |
| †Planarchaeidae | †Planarchaea | †?Planarchaea paucidentata | (Wunderlich) | 2008 | A planarchaeid palpimanoid spider, originally described as Filiauchenius paucidentatus. | |
| †Planarchaeidae | †Planarchaea | †Planarchaea pilosa | (Wunderlich) | 2015 | A planarchaeid palpimanoid spider, Originally described as Lacunauchenius pilosus. | |
| †Planarchaeidae | †Platythelae | †Platythelae longicorpus | Wunderlich in Wunderlich & Müller | 2021 | A planarchaeid palpimanoid spider. | |
| †Praearaneidae | †Praearaneus | †Praearaneus araneoides | Wunderlich & Müller | 2020 | A praearaneid spider. | |
| †Praearaneidae | †Praearaneus | †Praearaneus bruckschi | Wunderlich | 2017 | A praearaneid spider. | |
| †Praepholcidae | †Hamoderces | †Hamoderces opilionoides | Wunderlich & Müller | 2020 | A spider belonging to the superfamily Scytodoidea and the family Praepholcidae. | |
| †Praepholcidae | †Praepholcus | †Praepholcus huberi | Wunderlich | 2017 | An praepholcid spider. | |
| †Praeterleptonetidae | †Palaeohygropoda | †Palaeohygropoda myanmarensis | Penny | 2004 | A palaeohygropodine praeterleptonetid spider | |
| †Praeterleptonetidae | †Praeterleptoneta | †Praeterleptoneta spinipes | Wunderlich | 2008 | A Praeterleptonetine praeterleptonetid spider | |
| †Protoaraneoididae | †Praeteraraneoides | †Praeteraraneoides bifurcatum | Wunderlich in Wunderlich & Müller | 2018 | A protoaraneoidid spider. | |
| †Protoaraneoididae | †Praeteraraneoides | †Praeteraraneoides bipartitum | Wunderlich in Wunderlich & Müller | 2018 | A protoaraneoidid spider. | |
| †Protoaraneoididae | †Praeteraraneoides | †Praeteraraneoides leni | Wunderlich in Wunderlich & Müller | 2018 | A protoaraneoidid spider. | |
| †Protoaraneoididae | †Praeteraraneoides | †Praeteraraneoides multidentatum | Wunderlich | 2022 | A protoaraneoidid spider. | |
| †Protoaraneoididae | †Proaraneoides | †Proaraneoides cribellatum | Wunderlich in Wunderlich & Müller | 2018 | A protoaraneoidid spider. | |
| †Protoaraneoididae | †Proaraneoides | †Proaraneoides lanceatum | Wunderlich in Wunderlich & Müller | 2021 | A protoaraneoidid spider. | |
| †Protoaraneoididae | †Protoaraneoides | †Protoaraneoides longispina | Wunderlich in Wunderlich & Müller | 2018 | A protoaraneoidid spider. | |
| †Protoaraneoididae | †Spinipalpitibia | †Spinipalpitibia hirsuta | Wunderlich in Wunderlich & Müller | 2018 | A protoaraneoidid spider. | |
| †Protoaraneoididae | †Spinipalpitibia | †Spinipalpitibia maior | Wunderlich | 2015 | A protoaraneoidid spider. | |
| †Protoaraneoididae | †Spinipalpitibia | †Spinipalpitibia occulta | Wunderlich | 2023 | A protoaraneoidid spider. | |
| Psilodercidae | †Aculeatosoma | †Aculeatosoma pyritmutatio | Wunderlich | 2017 | A psilodercid spider. | |
| Psilodercidae | Priscaleclercera | †Priscaleclercera brevispinae | Wunderlich | 2017 | A psilodercid spider. | |
| Psilodercidae | Priscaleclercera | †Priscaleclercera chimei | Jiang & Li in Xin et al. | 2022 | A psilodercid spider. | |
| Psilodercidae | Priscaleclercera | †Priscaleclercera christae | Magalhaes et al. | 2021 | A psilodercid spider. | |
| Psilodercidae | Priscaleclercera | †Priscaleclercera ellenbergeri | (Wunderlich) | 2015 | A psilodercid spider. Originally described as "Leclercera" ellenbergeri. | |
| Psilodercidae | Priscaleclercera | †Priscaleclercera foshou | Jiang & Li in Xin et al. | 2022 | A psilodercid spider. | |
| Psilodercidae | Priscaleclercera | †Priscaleclercera furcata | Wunderlich & Müller | 2020 | A psilodercid spider. | |
| Psilodercidae | Priscaleclercera | †Priscaleclercera hamo | Wunderlich & Müller | 2020 | A psilodercid spider. | |
| Psilodercidae | Priscaleclercera | †Priscaleclercera hlaingi | Jiang & Li in Xin et al. | 2022 | A psilodercid spider. | |
| Psilodercidae | Priscaleclercera | †Priscaleclercera kani | Jiang & Li in Xin et al. | 2022 | A psilodercid spider. | |
| Psilodercidae | Priscaleclercera | †Priscaleclercera kyawae | Jiang & Li in Xin et al. | 2022 | A psilodercid spider. | |
| Psilodercidae | Priscaleclercera | †Priscaleclercera liber | Wunderlich & Müller | 2020 | A psilodercid spider. | |
| Psilodercidae | Priscaleclercera | †Priscaleclercera longissipes | (Wunderlich) | 2012 | A psilodercid spider. Originally described as "Leclercera" longissipes. | |
| Psilodercidae | Priscaleclercera | †Priscaleclercera paucispinae | Wunderlich | 2017 | A psilodercid spider. | |
| Psilodercidae | Priscaleclercera | †Priscaleclercera sexaculeata | (Wunderlich) | 2015 | A psilodercid spider. "Leclercera" sexaculeata. | |
| Psilodercidae | Priscaleclercera | †Priscaleclercera spicula | (Wunderlich) | 2012 | A psilodercid spider. "Leclercera" spicula. | |
| Psilodercidae | Priscaleclercera | †Priscaleclercera thanae | Jiang & Li in Xin et al. | 2022 | A psilodercid spider. | |
| Psilodercidae | Priscaleclercera | †Priscaleclercera thaungi | Jiang & Li in Xin et al. | 2022 | A psilodercid spider. | |
| †Salticoididae | †Burmadictyna | †Burmadictyna clava | Wunderlich | 2015 | A salticoidid deinopoid. | |
| †Salticoididae | †Burmadictyna | †Burmadictyna crassembolus | Wunderlich in Wunderlich & Müller | 2021 | A salticoidid deinopoid. | |
| †Salticoididae | †Burmadictyna | †Burmadictyna excavata | Wunderlich | 2015 | A salticoidid deinopoid. | |
| †Salticoididae | †Burmadictyna | †Burmadictyna fissura | Wunderlich in Wunderlich & Müller | 2021 | A salticoidid deinopoid. | |
| †Salticoididae | †Burmadictyna | †Burmadictyna pectin | Wunderlich | 2008 | A salticoidid deinopoid. | |
| †Salticoididae | †Burmadictyna | †Burmadictyna postcopula | Wunderlich | 2017 | A salticoidid deinopoid. | |
| †Salticoididae | †Burmadictyna | †Burmadictyna similis | Wunderlich in Wunderlich & Müller | 2021 | A salticoidid deinopoid. | |
| †Scutuloboridae | †Scutuloborella | †Scutuloborella admirabilis | Wunderlich in Wunderlich & Müller | 2021 | A member of the group Deinopoidea belonging to the family Scutuloboridae. | |
| †Scutuloboridae | †Scutuloboroides | Scutuloboroides pumilio | Wunderlich in Wunderlich & Müller | 2021 | A member of the group Deinopoidea belonging to the family Scutuloboridae. | |
| †Scutuloboridae | †Scutuloborus | †Scutuloborus spiralembolus | Wunderlich in Wunderlich & Müller | 2021 | A member of the group Deinopoidea belonging to the family Scutuloboridae. | |
| Scytodidae | Scytodes? | †Scytodes? nonalta | Wunderlich | 2023 | A spitting spider. | |
| Segestriidae | †Magnosegestria | †Magnosegestria tuber | Wunderlich & Müller | 2020 | Probably a tube-dwelling spider. | |
| †Spatiatoridae | †Spatiator | †Spatiator putescens | Wunderlich | 2015 | A spatiatorid spider. | |
| Telemidae | †Kachintelema | †Kachintelema calcarfemur | Wunderlich | 2022 | A telemid spider. | |
| Telemidae | Telemofila? | Telemofila? crassifemoralis | Wunderlich | 2017 | Possibly a species of Telemofila. | |
| Telemidae | Telemofila? | Telemofila? ovalis | Wunderlich in Wunderlich & Müller | 2021 | Possibly a species of Telemofila. | |
| Tetrablemmidae | †Alticorona | †Alticorona plenfemur | Wunderlich in Wunderlich & Müller | 2021 | An armored spider. | |
| Tetrablemmidae | †Bicornoculus | †Bicornoculus aungi | Jiang & Li in Xin et al. | 2022 | An armored spider. | |
| Tetrablemmidae | †Bicornoculus | †Bicornoculus granulans | Wunderlich & Müller | 2020 | An armored spider. | |
| Tetrablemmidae | †Bicornoculus | †Bicornoculus levis | Wunderlich | 2015 | An armored spider. | |
| Tetrablemmidae | †Bicornoculus | vBicornoculus wunnai | Jiang & Li in Xin et al. | 2022 | An armored spider. | |
| Tetrablemmidae | †Bicornoculus | †Bicornoculus yarzari | Jiang & Li in Xin et al. | 2022 | An armored spider. | |
| Tetrablemmidae | †Claspingblemma | †Claspingblemma duospinae | Wunderlich | 2022 | A tetrablemmid armored spider. | |
| Tetrablemmidae | †Cymbioblemma | †Cymbioblemma corniger | Wunderlich | 2017 | An armored spider. | |
| Tetrablemmidae | †Cymbioblemma | †Cymbioblemma fusca | Wunderlich & Müller | 2020 | An armored spider. | |
| Tetrablemmidae | †Cymbioblemma | †Cymbioblemma hamoembolus | Wunderlich & Müller | 2020 | An armored spider. | |
| Tetrablemmidae | †Cymbioblemma | †Cymbioblemma ohnmari | Jiang & Li in Xin et al. | 2022 | An armored spider. | |
| Tetrablemmidae | †Electroblemma | †Electroblemma acuminataformis | Wunderlich | 2022 | A tetrablemmid armored spider. | |
| Tetrablemmidae | †Electroblemma | †Electroblemma bifida | Selden, Zhang & Ren | 2016 | A tetrablemmid armored spider. | |
| Tetrablemmidae | †Electroblemma | †Electroblemma bifurcata | Wunderlich & Müller | 2020 | An armored spider. | |
| Tetrablemmidae | †Electroblemma | †Electroblemma bizarre | (Wunderlich) | 2017 | An armored spider. Originally described as "Brignoliblemma" bizarre. | |
| Tetrablemmidae | †Electroblemma | †Electroblemma caula | Wunderlich & Müller | 2020 | An armored spider. | |
| Tetrablemmidae | †Electroblemma | †Electroblemma nala | (Wunderlich) | 2017 | An armored spider. Originally described as "Brignoliblemma" nala. | |
| Tetrablemmidae | †Electroblemma | †Electroblemma paranala | (Wunderlich) | 2017 | An armored spider. Originally described as "Brignoliblemma" paranala. | |
| Tetrablemmidae | †Electroblemma | †Electroblemma pinnae | Wunderlich & Müller | 2020 | An armored spider. | |
| Tetrablemmidae | †Electroblemma | †Electroblemma retroflectum | Wunderlich | 2023 | An armored spider. | |
| Tetrablemmidae | †Electroblemma | †Electroblemma spermaferens | Wunderlich in Wunderlich & Müller | 2021 | An armored spider. | |
| Tetrablemmidae | †Eogamasomorpha | †Eogamasomorpha? clara | Wunderlich | 2015 | An armored spider of uncertain generic placement. | |
| Tetrablemmidae | †Eogamasomorpha | †Eogamasomorpha hamata | Wunderlich | 2017 | An armored spider. | |
| Tetrablemmidae | †Eogamasomorpha | †Eogamasomorpha magnaseta | Wunderlich | 2022 | A tetrablemmid armored spider. | |
| Tetrablemmidae | †Eogamasomorpha | †Eogamasomorpha nubila | Wunderlich | 2008 | An armored spider | |
| Tetrablemmidae | †Eogamasomorpha | †Eogamasomorpha ohlhoffi | (Wunderlich) | 2011 | An armored spider. Originally described as "Eoscaphiella" ohlhoffi. | |
| Tetrablemmidae | †Eogamasomorpha | †Eogamasomorpha rostratis | Wunderlich & Müller | 2020 | An armored spider. | |
| Tetrablemmidae | †Kachinblemma | †Kachinblemma constrictum | Wunderlich | 2023 | A tetrablemmid armored spider. | |
| Tetrablemmidae | †Longissithorax | †Longissithorax myanmarensis | Wunderlich | 2017 | An armored spider. | |
| Tetrablemmidae | †Longthorax | †Longthorax furca | (Wunderlich) | 2017 | An armored spider. Originally described as Longithorax furca. | |
| Tetrablemmidae | †Palpalpaculla | †Palpalpaculla phyui | Jiang & Li in Xin et al. | 2022 | An armored spider. | |
| Tetrablemmidae | †Palpalpaculla | †Palpalpaculla pulcher | Wunderlich | 2017 | An armored spider. | |
| Tetrablemmidae | †Procerclypeus | †Procerclypeus corniculatus | Wunderlich | 2022 | An armored spider. | |
| Tetrablemmidae | †Procerclypeus | †Procerclypeus deformans | Wunderlich in Wunderlich & Müller | 2021 | An armored spider. | |
| Tetrablemmidae | †Saetosoma | †Saetosoma filiembolus | Wunderlich | 2012 | An armored spider. | |
| Tetrablemmidae | †Tenuicephalus | †Tenuicephalus penicillus | Wunderlich in Wunderlich & Müller | 2021 | An armored spider. | |
| Tetrablemmidae | †Unicornutiblemma | †Unicornutiblemma brevicornis | Wunderlich & Müller | 2020 | An armored spider. | |
| Tetrablemmidae | †Unicornutiblemma | †Unicornutiblemma gracilicornis | Wunderlich & Müller | 2020 | An armored spider. | |
| Tetrablemmidae | †Unicornutiblemma | †Unicornutiblemma longicornis | Wunderlich & Müller | 2020 | An armored spider. | |
| Tetrablemmidae | †Unicornutiblemma | †Unicornutiblemma unicornis | (Wunderlich) | 2017 | An armored spider. Originally described as ?"Eogamasomorpha" unicornis. | |
| Tetrablemmidae | †Uniscutosoma | †Uniscutosoma aberrans | Wunderlich | 2015 | An armored spider. | |
| Theraphosidae | †Protertheraphosa | †Protertheraphosa spinipes | Wunderlich & Müller | 2020 | A tarantula. | |
| Theridiidae | †Burmatheridion | †Burmatheridion cetani | Jiang & Li in Xin et al. | 2022 | A theridiid spider. | |
| Theridiidae | †Burmatheridion | †Burmatheridion sinespinae | Wunderlich in Wunderlich & Müller | 2018 | A theridiid spider. | |
| Theridiidae | †Cornutheridion | Cornutheridion concavum | Wunderlich in Wunderlich & Müller | 2021 | A cobweb spider. | |
| Theridiidae | †Cretotheridion | †?Cretotheridion aculeatum | Wunderlich | 2026 | | |
| Theridiidae | †Cretotheridion | †Cretotheridion champoi | Jiang & Li in Xin et al. | 2022 | A cobweb spider. | |
| Theridiidae | †Cretotheridion | †Cretotheridion inopinatum | Wunderlich | 2015 | A cobweb spider. | |
| Theridiidae | †Microtheridion | †Microtheridion longissispinae | Wunderlich in Wunderlich & Müller | 2021 | Probably a cobweb spider. | |
| Theridiidae | †Triangulum | †Triangulum thutai | Jiang & Li in Xin et al. | 2022 | A theridiid spider. | |
| Uloboridae | †Bicalamistrum | †Bicalamistrum mixtum | Wunderlich | 2015 | A cribellate orb weaver. | |
| Uloboridae | †Boavista | †Boavista crassifemora | Wunderlich in Wunderlich & Müller | 2021 | A cribellate orb weaver. | |
| Uloboridae | †Burmasuccinus | †Burmasuccinus bulla | Wunderlich in Wunderlich & Müller | 2018 | A uloborid spider. | |
| Uloboridae | †Burmuloborus | †Burmuloborus antefixus | Wunderlich | 2015 | A cribellate orb weaver. | |
| Uloboridae | †Burmuloborus | †Burmuloborus parvus | Wunderlich | 2008 | A cribellate orb weaver. | |
| Uloboridae | †Burmuloborus | †Burmuloborus? prolongatus | Wunderlich | 2015 | A cribellate orb weaver of uncertain placement. | |
| Uloboridae | †Kachin | †Kachin fruticosoides | Wunderlich | 2017 | A cribellate orb weaver. | |
| Uloboridae | †Kachin | †Kachin fruticosus | Wunderlich | 2017 | A cribellate orb weaver. | |
| Uloboridae | †Kachin | †Kachin serratus | Wunderlich | 2018 | A cribellate orb weaver. | |
| Uloboridae | †Microuloborus | †Microuloborus ater | Wunderlich | 2022 | A cribellate orb weaver. | |
| Uloboridae | †Microuloborus | †Microuloborus birmanicus | Wunderlich | 2015 | A cribellate orb weaver. | |
| Uloboridae | †Microuloborus | †Microuloborus oblongus | Wunderlich in Wunderlich & Müller | 2021 | A cribellate orb weaver. | |
| Uloboridae | †Ocululoborus | †Ocululoborus curvatus | Wunderlich | 2012 | A cribellate orb weaver. | |
| Uloboridae | †Parakachin | †Parakachin pectunculus | Wunderlich | 2023 | A cribellate orb weaver. | |
| Uloboridae | †Paramiagrammopes | Paramiagrammopes appendix | Wunderlich in Wunderlich & Müller | 2021 | A cribellate orb weaver. | |
| Uloboridae | †Paramiagrammopes | †Paramiagrammopes cretaceus | Wunderlich | 2008 | A cribellate orb weaver. | |
| Uloboridae | †Paramiagrammopes | †Paramiagrammopes curvatus | Wunderlich in Wunderlich & Müller | 2021 | A cribellate orb weaver. | |
| Uloboridae | †Paramiagrammopes | †Paramiagrammopes furca | Wunderlich in Wunderlich & Müller | 2021 | A cribellate orb weaver. | |
| Uloboridae | †Paramiagrammopes | †Paramiagrammopes granulatus | Wunderlich in Wunderlich & Müller | 2021 | A cribellate orb weaver. | |
| Uloboridae | †Paramiagrammopes | †Paramiagrammopes inaequalis | Wunderlich in Wunderlich & Müller | 2021 | A cribellate orb weaver. | |
| Uloboridae | †Paramiagrammopes | †Paramiagrammopes inclinatus | Wunderlich in Wunderlich & Müller | 2021 | A cribellate orb weaver. | |
| Uloboridae | †Paramiagrammopes | †Paramiagrammopes longiclypeus | Wunderlich | 2015 | A cribellate orb weaver. | |
| Uloboridae | †Paramiagrammopes | †Paramiagrammopes multifemurspinae | Wunderlich in Wunderlich & Müller | 2021 | A cribellate orb weaver. | |
| Uloboridae | †Paramiagrammopes | †Paramiagrammopes paracurvatus | Wunderlich in Wunderlich & Müller | 2021 | A cribellate orb weaver. | |
| Uloboridae | †Paramiagrammopes | †Paramiagrammopes patellaris | (Wunderlich) | 2017 | A cribellate orb weaver. Originally described as Furculoborus patellaris. | |
| Uloboridae | †Paramiagrammopes | †Paramiagrammopes patellidens | Wunderlich | 2015 | A cribellate orb weaver. | |
| Uloboridae | †Paramiagrammopes | †Paramiagrammopes pilosus | Wunderlich in Wunderlich & Müller | 2021 | A cribellate orb weaver. | |
| Uloboridae | †Paramiagrammopes | †Paramiagrammopes pollex | Wunderlich in Wunderlich & Müller | 2021 | A cribellate orb weaver. | |
| Uloboridae | †Paramiagrammopes | †Paramiagrammopes pusillus | Wunderlich in Wunderlich & Müller | 2018 | A cribellate orb weaver. | |
| Uloboridae | †Paramiagrammopes | †Paramiagrammopes semiapertus | Wunderlich in Wunderlich & Müller | 2021 | A cribellate orb weaver. | |
| Uloboridae | †Paramiagrammopes | †Paramiagrammopes simplex | Wunderlich in Wunderlich & Müller | 2021 | A cribellate orb weaver. | |
| Uloboridae | †Paramiagrammopes | †Paramiagrammopes sulcus | Wunderlich in Wunderlich & Müller | 2021 | A cribellate orb weaver. | |
| Uloboridae | †Paramiagrammopes | †Paramiagrammopes texter | Wunderlich in Wunderlich & Müller | 2021 | A cribellate orb weaver. | |
| Uloboridae | †Paramiagrammopes | †Paramiagrammopes unibrevispina | Wunderlich in Wunderlich & Müller | 2021 | A cribellate orb weaver. | |
| Uloboridae | †Paramiagrammopes | †Paramiagrammopes vesica | (Wunderlich) | 2008 | A cribellate orb weaver. Originally described as Palaeomiagrammopes vesica. | |
| Uloboridae | †Planibulbus | †Planibulbus longisoma | Wunderlich in Wunderlich & Müller | 2018 | A uloborid spider. | |
| Uloboridae | †Propterkachin | †Propterkachin bispinatus | Wunderlich in Wunderlich & Müller | 2021 | A cribellate orb weaver. | |
| Uloboridae | †Propterkachin | †Propterkachin magnoculus | Wunderlich | 2017 | A cribellate orb weaver. | |
| Uloboridae | †Propterkachin | †Propterkachin pygmaeus | Wunderlich | 2022 | A cribellate orb weaver. | |
| Uloboridae | †Propterkachin | †Propterkachin unispinatus | Wunderlich | 2022 | A cribellate orb weaver. | |
| Uloboridae | †Pseudokachin | †Pseudokachin tuberculatus | Wunderlich in Wunderlich & Müller | 2021 | A cribellate orb weaver. | |
| Uloboridae | †Spiniuloborus | †Spiniuloborus crux | Wunderlich in Wunderlich & Müller | 2021 | A cribellate orb weaver. | |
| †Vetiaroridae | †Pekkachilus | †Pekkachilus vesica | Wunderlich | 2017 | A vetiatorid spider. | |
| †Vetiaroridae | †Praetervetiator | †Praetervetiator circulus | Wunderlich in Wunderlich & Müller | 2021 | A vetiatorid palpimanoid spider. | |
| †Vetiaroridae | †Praetervetiator | †Praetervetiator parvicirculus | Wunderlich | 2022 | A vetiatorid spider. | |
| †Vetiaroridae | †Procervetiator | †Procervetiator fruticosus | Wunderlich in Wunderlich & Müller | 2021 | A vetiatorid palpimanoid spider. | |
| †Vetiaroridae | †Vetiator | †Vetiator gracilipes | Wunderlich | 2015 | A vetiatorid spider. | |
| †Zarqaraneidae | †Alteraraneus | Alteraraneus gracilipes | Wunderlich in Wunderlich & Müller | 2018 | A zarqaraneid spider. | |
| †Zarqaraneidae | †Burmaforceps | †Burmaforceps amputatus | Wunderlich in Wunderlich & Müller | 2018 | A zarqaraneid spider. | |
| †Zarqaraneidae | †Burmaspiralis | †Burmaspiralis trispinae | Wunderlich in Wunderlich & Müller | 2021 | A zarqaraneid spider. | |
| †Zarqaraneidae | †Converszarqaraneus | †Converszarqaraneus annulipedes | Wunderlich in Wunderlich & Müller | 2018 | A zarqaraneid spider. | |
| †Zarqaraneidae | †Cornicaraneus | †Cornicaraneus scutatus | Wunderlich in Wunderlich & Müller | 2018 | A zarqaraneid spider. | |
| †Zarqaraneidae | †Cornicaraneus | †Cornicaraneus? unuspedipalpus | Wunderlich | 2023 | A zarqaraneid spider. | |
| †Zarqaraneidae | †Crassitibia | †Crassitibia baculum | Wunderlich in Wunderlich & Müller | 2018 | A zarqaraneid spider. | |
| †Zarqaraneidae | †Crassitibia | †Crassitibia longispina | Wunderlich | 2015 | A zarqaraneid spider. | |
| †Zarqaraneidae | †Crassitibia | †Crassitibia sicilicula | Wunderlich in Wunderlich & Müller | 2021 | A zarqaraneid spider. | |
| †Zarqaraneidae | †Crassitibia | †Crassitibia tenuimana | Wunderlich | 2015 | A zarqaraneid spider. | |
| †Zarqaraneidae | †Curvitibia | †Curvitibia curima | Wunderlich | 2015 | A zarqaraneid spider. The type species is Curvitibia . | |
| †Zarqaraneidae | †Curvitibia | †Curvitibia pellucidus | Wunderlich | 2023 | A zarqaraneid spider. | |
| †Zarqaraneidae | †Gibberaraneoid | †Gibberaraneoid furcula | Wunderlich | 2023 | Probably a zarqaraneid spider. | |
| †Zarqaraneidae | †Groehnianus | Groehnianus burmensis | Wunderlich | 2015 | A zarqaraneid spider. | |
| †Zarqaraneidae | †Hypotheridiosoma | †Hypotheridiosoma paracymbium | Wunderlich | 2012 | A zarqaraneid spider. | |
| †Zarqaraneidae | †Microproxiaraneus | †Microproxiaraneus annulatus | Wunderlich in Wunderlich & Müller | 2018 | A zarqaraneid spider. | |
| †Zarqaraneidae | †Palazarqaraneus | †Palazarqaraneus hamulus | Wunderlich & Müller | 2020 | A zarqaraneid spider. | |
| †Zarqaraneidae | †Palptibiaap | Palptibiaap cochlear | Wunderlich | 2022 | A zarqaraneid spider. | |
| †Zarqaraneidae | †Parvispinina | Parvispinina tibialis | (Wunderlich) | 2011 | A zarqaraneid spider. Originally described as "Praeterleptoneta" tibialis. | |
| †Zarqaraneidae | †Paurospina | †Paurospina curvata | Wunderlich in Wunderlich & Müller | 2018 | A zarqaraneid spider. | |
| †Zarqaraneidae | †Paurospina | †Paurospina fastigata | Wunderlich & Müller | 2020 | A zarqaraneid spider. | |
| †Zarqaraneidae | †Paurospina | †Paurospina fortis | Wunderlich in Wunderlich & Müller | 2018 | A zarqaraneid spider. | |
| †Zarqaraneidae | †Paurospina | †Paurospina paulocurvata | Wunderlich in Wunderlich & Müller | 2018 | A zarqaraneid spider. | |
| †Zarqaraneidae | †Proxiaraneus | †Proxiaraneus rarus | Wunderlich in Wunderlich & Müller | 2018 | A zarqaraneid spider. | |
| †Zarqaraneidae | †Ramozarqaraneus | †Ramozarqaraneus pauxillus | Wunderlich in Wunderlich & Müller | 2018 | A zarqaraneid spider. | |
| †Zarqaraneidae | †Spinicymbium | †Spinicymbium curvimetatarsus | Wunderlich in Wunderlich & Müller | 2018 | A zarqaraneid spider. | |
| †Zarqaraneidae | †Spinicymbium | †Spinicymbium curviparacymbium | Wunderlich | 2022 | A zarqaraneid spider. | |
| †Zarqaraneidae | †Spinicymbium | †Spinicymbium falcata | (Wunderlich) | 2015 | A zarqaraneid spider. Originally described as "Hypotheridiosoma" falcata. | |
| †Zarqaraneidae | †Spinicymbium | †Spinicymbium unispina | Wunderlich in Wunderlich & Müller | 2021 | A zarqaraneid spider. | |
| Incertae sedis | †Alioatrax | Alioatrax incertus | Wunderlich | 2017 | A spider of uncertain affinities, originally described as a hexathelid funnel web spider. | |
| Incertae sedis | †Biapophyses | †Biapophyses beate | Wunderlich | 2015 | First described as a praeterleptonetid spider. | |
| Incertae sedis | †Palaeoleptoneta | †Palaeoleptoneta acus | Wunderlich | 2022 | Originally described as a leptonetid spider. | |
| Incertae sedis | †Palaeoleptoneta | †Palaeoleptoneta baculum | Wunderlich | 2022 | Originally described as a leptonetid spider. | |
| Incertae sedis | †Palaeoleptoneta | †Palaeoleptoneta calcar | Wunderlich | 2012 | A member of Araneomorphae of uncertain affinities, originally described as a leptonetid spider. | |
| Incertae sedis | †Palaeoleptoneta | †Palaeoleptoneta crus | Wunderlich | 2017 | Originally described as a leptonetid spider. | |
| Incertae sedis | †Palaeoleptoneta | †Palaeoleptoneta fissura | Wunderlich in Wunderlich & Müller | 2021 | Originally described as a leptonetid spider. | |
| Incertae sedis | †Palaeoleptoneta | †Palaeoleptoneta laticymbium | Wunderlich | 2022 | Originally described as a leptonetid spider. | |
| Incertae sedis | †Palaeoleptoneta | †Palaeoleptoneta nils | Wunderlich in Wunderlich & Müller | 2018 | A member of Araneomorphae of uncertain affinities, originally described as a leptonetid spider. | |
| Incertae sedis | †Palaeoleptoneta | †Palaeoleptoneta thilo | Wunderlich in Wunderlich & Müller | 2018 | A member of Araneomorphae of uncertain affinities, originally described as a leptonetid spider. | |

==== Ixodida ====
| Family | Genus | Species | Authority | Year described | Notes | image |
|---|---|---|---|---|---|---|
| Ixodidae | Amblyomma | †Amblyomma birmitum | Chitimia-Dobler et al. | 2017 | An ixodid hard tick. | |
| Ixodidae | Archaeocroton | †Archaeocroton kaufmani | Chitimia-Dobler, Mans & Dunlop | 2022 | An ixodid hard tick. | |
| Ixodidae | Bothriocroton | †Bothriocroton muelleri | Chitimia-Dobler, Mans & Dunlop | 2022 | An ixodid hard tick. | |
| Ixodidae | †Compluriscutula | †Compluriscutula vetulum | Poinar & Buckley | 2008 | An ixodid hard tick. | |
| Ixodidae | †Cornupalpatum | †Cornupalpatum burmanicum | Poinar & Brown | 2003 | An ixodid tick | Cornupalpatum burmanicum |
| Ixodidae | Haemaphysalis | †Haemaphysalis cretacea | Chitimia-Dobler, Pfeffer & Dunlop | 2018 | A Haemaphysaline hard tick. | |
| Ixodidae | Ixodes | †Ixodes antiquorum | Chitimia-Dobler, Mans & Dunlop in Chitimia-Dobler et al. | 2022 | A tick, a species of Ixodes. | |
| †Khimairidae | †Khimaira | †Khimaira fossus | Chitimia-Dobler, Mans & Dunlop in Chitimia-Dobler et al. | 2022 | A tick combining a body resembling that of a soft tick with a basis capitulum more like that of a hard tick, assigned to a new family Khimairidae as a possible transitional form between soft and hard ticks. | |
| Nuttalliellidae | †Deinocroton | Deinocroton bicornis | Chitimia-Dobler, Mans & Dunlop in Chitimia-Dobler et al. | 2024 | A nuttalliellid tick | |
| Nuttalliellidae | †Deinocroton | Deinocroton copia | Chitimia-Dobler, Mans & Dunlop in Chitimia-Dobler et al. | 2022 | A nuttalliellid tick | |
| Nuttalliellidae | †Deinocroton | Deinocroton draculi | Peñalver, Arillo, Anderson & Pérez-de la Fuente | 2017 | A nuttalliellid tick. | Deinocroton draculi |
| Nuttalliellidae | †Deinocroton | Deinocroton lacrimus | Chitimia-Dobler, Mans & Dunlop in Chitimia-Dobler et al. | 2024 | A nuttalliellid tick | |
| Nuttalliellidae | †Legionaris | †Legionaris robustus | Chitimia-Dobler, Mans & Dunlop in Chitimia-Dobler et al. | 2024 | A nuttalliellid tick. | Legionaris robustus |
| Nuttalliellidae | Nuttalliella | Nuttalliella gratae | Chitimia-Dobler, Mans & Dunlop in Chitimia-Dobler et al. | 2024 | A nuttalliellid tick. | |
| Nuttalliellidae | Nuttalliella | Nuttalliella odyssea | Chitimia-Dobler, Mans & Dunlop in Chitimia-Dobler et al. | 2024 | A nuttalliellid tick. | |
| Nuttalliellidae | Nuttalliella | Nuttalliella placaventrala | Chitimia-Dobler, Mans & Dunlop in Chitimia-Dobler et al. | 2024 | A nuttalliellid tick. | |
| Nuttalliellidae | Nuttalliella | Nuttalliella tropicasylvae | Chitimia-Dobler, Mans & Dunlop in Chitimia-Dobler et al. | 2024 | A nuttalliellid tick. | |
| Nuttalliellidae | Nuttalliella | Nuttalliella tuberculata | Chitimia-Dobler, Mans & Dunlop in Chitimia-Dobler et al. | 2024 | A nuttalliellid tick. | |

==== Opilioacariformes ====
| Family | Genus | Species | Authority | Year described | Notes | image |
|---|---|---|---|---|---|---|
| Opilioacaridae | Opilioacarus | †Opilioacarus? groehni | Dunlop & Bernardi | 2014 | An opilioacarid mite. | |

==== Opiliones ====
| Taxon | Authority | Year described | Notes | image |
|---|---|---|---|---|
| Biungulus xiai | Bartel et al. | 2020 | An epedanid armoured harvestman. | |
| Burmalomanius circularis | Bartel et al. | 2022 | A podoctid harvestman. | |
| Ellenbergellus tuberculatus | Bartel et al. | 2020 | A tithaeid harvestman. | |
| Foveacorpus cretaceus | Bartel, Dunlop & Giribet | 2023 | A member of Cyphophthalmi. | |
| Foveacorpus parvus | Bartel, Dunlop & Giribet | 2023 | A member of Cyphophthalmi. | |
| Gigantocheles nilsi | Bartel et al. | 2020 | An epedanid armoured harvestman. | |
| Halitherses grimaldii | Giribet & Dunlop | 2005 | An ortholasmatine nemastomatid harvestman | |
| Leptopsalis breyeri | Bartel, Dunlop & Giribet | 2023 | A stylocellid harvestman. | |
| Mesodibunus tourinhoae | Bartel et al. | 2022 | An epedanid harvestman. | |
| Mesokanus oehmkuehnlei | Bartel et al. | 2020 | A mesokanid laniatorean harvestman. | |
| Mesopsalis oblongus | Bartel, Dunlop & Giribet | 2023 | A member of Cyphophthalmi. | |
| Monooculricinuleus incisus | Wunderlich | 2017 | A monooculricinuleid harvestman. | |
| Monooculricinuleus semiglobosus | Wunderlich | 2017 | A monooculricinuleid harvestman. | |
| Palaeobeloniscus thilolebi | Bartel et al. | 2020 | A beloniscid harvestman. | |
| Palaeosiro burmanicum | Poinar | 2008 | A stylocellid harvestmant | |
| Petrobunoides sharmai | Selden et al. | 2016 | An epedanid armoured harvestman. | |
| Petroburma tarsomeria | Bartel et al. | 2022 | A petrobunid harvestman. | |
| Protopyramidops nalae | Bartel et al. | 2020 | Possibly a pyramidopid harvestman. | |
| Sirocellus iunctus | Bartel, Dunlop & Giribet | 2023 | A member of Cyphophthalmi. | |
| Tyrannobunus aculeus | Bartel & Dunlop | 2023 | A eupnoid harvestman. | |

==== Palpigradi ====
| Taxon | Authority | Year described | Notes | image |
|---|---|---|---|---|
| Electrokoenenia yaksha | Engel & Huang | 2016 | A Eukoeneniid microwhip scorpion | |

==== Pseudoscorpiones ====
| Taxon | Authority | Year described | Notes | image |
|---|---|---|---|---|
| Amblyolpium burmiticum | (Cockerell) | 1920 | A garypinid pseudoscorpion. Originally described as "Garypus" burmiticus. | |
| Burmachernes cenomanium | Willmott, Kotthoff & Harms | 2026 | A chernetid pseudoscorpion. | |
| Burmeochthonius kachinae | Johnson et al. | 2022 | A chthoniid pseudoscorpion. | |
| Burmeochthonius muelleri | Johnson et al. | 2022 | A chthoniid pseudoscorpion. | |
| Electrobisium acutum | Cockerell | 1917 | A neobisiid pseudoscorpion | |
| Hya fynni | Röschmann et al. | 2024 | A hyid pseudoscorpion. | |
| Prionochthonius burmiticus | Wriedt et al. | 2021 | A chthoniid pseudoscorpion | |
| Proalbiorix compactus | Geißler et al. | 2021 | A pseudoscorpion belonging to the family Ideoroncidae. | |
| Proalbiorix gracilis | Geißler et al. | 2021 | A pseudoscorpion belonging to the family Ideoroncidae. | |
| Procheiridium judsoni | Porta et al. | 2020 | A cheiridiid pseudoscorpion. | Procheiridium judsoni |
| Protofeaella peetersae | Henderickx in Henderickx & Boone | 2016 | A pseudoscorpion of uncertain placement. | |
| Weygoldtiella plausus | Harvey et al. | 2018 | A chthoniid pseudoscorpion. | |

==== Ricinulei ====
| Taxon | Authority | Year described | Notes | image |
|---|---|---|---|---|
| Hirsutisoma acutiformis | Wunderlich | 2017 | A Hirsutisomid hooded tickspider. | |
| Hirsutisoma bruckschi | Wunderlich | 2017 | A Hirsutisomid hooded tickspider. | |
| Hirsutisoma dentata | Wunderlich | 2017 | A Hirsutisomid hooded tickspider. | |
| Hirsutisoma grimaldii | Botero-Trujillo et al. | 2022 | A hirsutisomid hooded tickspider. | |
| Protoricinus cretaceus | (Wunderlich) | 2012 | A member of Posteriorricinulei. Originally described as ?Poliochera cretacea. | |
| Protoricinus solorzanoae | Gamarra-Cuba, Selden & Delclòs | 2026 | A member of Posteriorricinulei. | |
| Primoricinuleus pugio | Wunderlich | 2015 | A primoricinuleid hooded tickspider. | |
| Sigillaricinuleus tripares | Wunderlich | 2022 | | |

==== Sarcoptiformes ====
| Family | Genus | Species | Authority | Year described | Notes | image |
|---|---|---|---|---|---|---|
| Achipteriidae | †Cerachipteria | †Cerachipteria ahsokatanoae | Arillo, Subías & Huang | 2023 | An achipteriid mite. | |
| Pediculochelidae | †Paralycus | †Paralycus primus | Kolesnikov et al. | 2025 | A pediculochelid mite. | |

==== Schizomida ====
| Taxon | Authority | Year described | Notes | image |
|---|---|---|---|---|
| Annazomus parvulus | De Francesco Magnussen in De Francesco Magnussen et al. | 2022 | A member of the family Hubbardiidae. | |
| Cretaceozomus angustocaudatus | De Francesco Magnussen in De Francesco Magnussen et al. | 2022 | | |
| Cretaceozomus robustus | De Francesco Magnussen in De Francesco Magnussen et al. | 2022 | | |
| Groehnizomus oculiferans | De Francesco Magnussen & Müller in De Francesco Magnussen et al. | 2022 | | |
| Groehnizomus rodrigoi | Müller in De Francesco Magnussen et al. | 2022 | | |
| Mesozomus groehni | Müller et al. | 2020 | A short-tailed whip scorpion | |
| Muellerizomus amandae | De Francesco Magnussen & Müller in De Francesco Magnussen et al. | 2022 | | |
| Muellerizomus palicaudatus | De Francesco Magnussen in De Francesco Magnussen et al. | 2022 | | |

==== Scorpiones ====
| Taxon | Authority | Year described | Notes | image |
|---|---|---|---|---|
| Archaeoananteroides carusoi | Lourenço in Lourenço & Velten | 2025 | A buthoid scorpion. | |
| Archaeoananteroides maderai | Lourenço & Velten | 2016 | A buthoid scorpion. | |
| Archaeoscorpiops cretacicus | Lourenço | 2015 | A palaeoeuscorpiid scorpion. | |
| Archaeoscorpiops grossei | Lourenço in Lourenço & Velten | 2023 | A palaeoeuscorpiid scorpion. | |
| Betaburmesebuthus bellus | Lourenço | 2016 | A palaeoburmesebuthid scorpion. | Betaburmesebuthus bellus |
| Betaburmesebuthus bidentatus | Lourenço | 2015 | A palaeoburmesebuthid scorpion. | |
| Betaburmesebuthus fleissneri | Lourenço & Velten | 2016 | A palaeoburmesebuthid scorpion. | |
| Betaburmesebuthus fuscus | Xuan, Cai & Huang | 2023 | A palaeoburmesebuthid scorpion. | |
| Betaburmesebuthus joergi | Lourenço & Rossi | 2017 | A palaeoburmesebuthid scorpion. | |
| Betaburmesebuthus kobberti | Lourenço | 2015 | A palaeoburmesebuthid scorpion. | |
| Betaburmesebuthus larafleissnerae | Lourenço & Velten | 2016 | A palaeoburmesebuthid scorpion. | |
| Betaburmesebuthus muelleri | Lourenço | 2015 | A palaeoburmesebuthid scorpion. | |
| Betaburmesebuthus spinipedis | Xuan, Cai & Huang | 2022 | A palaeoburmesebuthid scorpion. | |
| Betaburmesebuthus thomasvelteni | Lourenço in Lourenço & Velten | 2024 | A palaeoburmesebuthid scorpion. | |
| Betaburmesebuthus villosus | Xuan, Cai & Huang | 2023 | A palaeoburmesebuthid scorpion. | |
| Burmesescorpiops groehni | Lourenço | 2016 | An Archaeoscorpiopinae palaeoeuscorpiid scorpion. | |
| Burmesescorpiops velteni | Lourenço | 2024 | An Archaeoscorpiopinae palaeoeuscorpiid scorpion. | |
| Chaerilobuthus birmanicus | Lourenço | 2015 | A chaerilobuthid or pseudochactid scorpion. | |
| Chaerilobuthus brandti | Lourenço | 2022 | A chaerilobuthid or pseudochactid scorpion. | |
| Chaerilobuthus bruckschi | Lourenço | 2015 | A chaerilobuthid or pseudochactid scorpion. | |
| Chaerilobuthus complexus | Lourenço & Beigel | 2011 | A chaerilobuthid or pseudochactid scorpion. | |
| Chaerilobuthus enigmaticus | Lourenço | 2015 | A chaerilobuthid or pseudochactid scorpion. | |
| Chaerilobuthus gigantosternum | Lourenço | 2016 | A chaerilobuthid or pseudochactid scorpion. | |
| Chaerilobuthus hansgeorgmuelleri | Lourenço | 2019 | A chaerilobuthid or pseudochactid scorpion. | |
| Chaerilobuthus knodelorum | Lourenço | 2018 | A chaerilobuthid or pseudochactid scorpion. | |
| Chaerilobuthus longiaculeus | Lourenço | 2013 | A chaerilobuthid or pseudochactid scorpion. | |
| Chaerilobuthus meggeri | Lourenço | 2021 | A chaerilobuthid or pseudochactid scorpion. | |
| Chaerilobuthus petersi | Lourenço in Lourenço & Velten | 2024 | A chaerilobuthid or pseudochactid scorpion. | |
| Chaerilobuthus serratus | Lourenço | 2016 | A chaerilobuthid or pseudochactid scorpion. | |
| Chaerilobuthus schwarzi | Lourenço | 2015 | A chaerilobuthid or pseudochactid scorpion. | |
| Chaerilobuthus staxi | Lourenço in Lourenço & Velten | 2024 | A chaerilobuthid or pseudochactid scorpion. | |
| Chaeriloiurus brigittemuellerae | Lourenço | 2020 | A chaerilobuthid or pseudochactid scorpion. Possibly a species of Chaerilobuthus. | |
| Chaeriloscorpiops bautschi | Lourenço | 2020 | A palaeoeuscorpiid scorpion. | |
| Cretaceousbuthus fraaijeorum | Lourenço | 2022 | A buthid scorpion. | |
| Cretaceousbuthus petersi | Lourenço in Lourenço & Velten | 2023 | A buthid scorpion. | |
| Cretaceoushormiops elegans | Xuan et al. | 2023 | A protoischnurid scorpion. | |
| Cretaceoushormiops knodeli | Lourenço | 2018 | A protoischnurid scorpion. | |
| Cretaceoushormiops petersi | Lourenço | 2025 | A protoischnurid scorpion. | |
| Cretaceoushormiops staxi | Lourenço in Lourenço & Velten | 2022 | A protoischnurid scorpion. | |
| Cretaceousopisthacanthus smeelei | Lourenço in Lourenço & Velten | 2021 | A protoischnurid scorpion. | |
| Electrochaerilus buckleyi | Santiago-Blay, Fet, Solegrad & Anderson | 2004 | A chaerilid scorpion | |
| Palaeoburmesebuthus andrewrossi | Santiago-Blay et al. | 2022 | A palaeoburmesebuthid scorpion. | |
| Palaeoburmesebuthus grimaldii | Lourenço | 2002 | A palaeoburmesebuthid scorpion. | |
| Palaeoburmesebuthus knodeli | Lourenço | 2018 | A palaeoburmesebuthid scorpion. | |
| Palaeoburmesebuthus longipalpis | Lourenço & Rossi | 2017 | A palaeoburmesebuthid scorpion. | |
| Palaeoburmesebuthus ohlhoffi | Lourenço | 2015 | A palaeoburmesebuthid scorpion. | |
| Palaeoburmesebuthus smithi | Santiago-Blay, Soleglad, Craig & Fet in Santiago-Blay et al. | 2022 | A palaeoburmesebuthid scorpion. | |
| Palaeotrilineatus ellenbergeri | Lourenço | 2012 | A palaeotrilineatid scorpion. | |
| Paranotaburmesebuthus schmidti | Lourenço in Lourenço & Velten | 2024 | A palaeoburmesebuthid scorpion. | |
| Serratochaerilobuthus schmidti | Lourenço in Lourenço & Velten | 2024 | A chaerilobuthid or pseudochactid scorpion. Possibly a species of Chaerilobuthus. | |
| Spinoburmesebuthus knodelorum | Lourenço | 2021 | A palaeoburmesebuthid buthoidean scorpion. | |
| Spinoburmesebuthus pohli | Lourenço & Velten | 2017 | A palaeoburmesebuthid buthoidean scorpion. | |
| Sucinlourencous adrianae | Rossi | 2015 | A sucinlourencoid scorpion. | |

==== Solifugae ====
| Taxon | Authority | Year described | Notes | image |
|---|---|---|---|---|
| Cushingia ellenbergeri | Dunlop et al. | 2015 | A solifuge of uncertain phylogenetic placement. | |

==== Uropygi (Thelyphonida) ====
| Taxon | Authority | Year described | Notes | image |
|---|---|---|---|---|
| Burmathelyphonia prima | Wunderlich | 2015 | A whip scorpion of uncertain placement. | |
| Crethypoctonus kachinus | Zhou et al. | 2023 | A whip scorpion. | |
| Mesothelyphonus parvus | Cai & Huang | 2017 | A thelyphonine whip scorpion. | |

==== Trombidiformes ====
| Family | Genus | Species | Authority | Year described | Notes | image |
|---|---|---|---|---|---|---|
| Bdellidae | †Odontoscirus | †Odontoscirus cretacico | Porta et al. | 2020 | A bdellid mite. | |
| Caeculidae | †Procaeculus | †Procaeculus coineaui | Porta et al. | 2019 | A caeculid mite. | |
| Cheyletidae | †Cheyletus | †Cheyletus burmiticus | Cockerell | 1917 | A cheyletid mite | |
| Erythraeidae | †Burerythrites | †Burerythrites pankowskii | Konikiewicz & Mąkol | 2018 | An erythraeid mite. | |
| Erythraeidae | †Burphanolophus | †Burphanolophus joergwunderlichi | Konikiewicz & Mąkol | 2018 | An erythraeid mite. | |
| Resinacaridae | †Protoresinacarus | †Protoresinacarus brevipedis | Khaustov & Poinar | 2011 | A resinacarid pyemotoid mite. | |
| Smarididae | †Burfessonia | †Burfessonia maryae | Konikiewicz & Mąkol | 2018 | A Smaridid mite. | |
| Smarididae | †Immensmaris | †Immensmaris chewbaccei | Dunlop, Frahnert & Mąkol | 2018 | A smaridid mite. | Immensmaris chewbaccei |
| Trochometridiidae | †Rhombometridium | †Rhombometridium pankowskiorum | Khaustov, Vorontsov & Lindquist | 2024 | A trochometridiid mite. | |
| Trombellidae | †Nothrotrombidium | †Nothrotrombidium myanmarum | Konikiewicz & Mąkol | 2018 | A trombellid mite. | |

==== Incertae sedis ====
| Taxon | Authority | Year described | Notes | image |
|---|---|---|---|---|
| Chimerarachne alexbeigel | Wunderlich | 2023 | | |
| Chimerarachne longiflagellum | (Wunderlich) | 2022 | Originally described as Parachimerarachne longiflagellum. | |
| Chimerarachne patrickmueller | Wunderlich | 2023 | | |
| Chimerarachne spiniflagellum | Wunderlich | 2023 | | |
| Chimerarachne yingi | Wang et al. | 2018 | A stem-group spider | Chimerarachne yingi (artists reconstruction) |

=== Chilopoda ===
| Taxon | Authority | Year described | Notes | image |
|---|---|---|---|---|
| Kachinophilus pereirai | Bonato, Edgecombe & Minelli | 2013 | A geophilid centipede | |
| Lithopendra anjafliessae | Haug, Haug & Haug | 2023 | A centipede belonging to the group Pleurostigmophora | |

=== Diplopoda ===
==== Callipodida ====
| Taxon | Authority | Year described | Notes | image |
|---|---|---|---|---|
| Burmanopetalum inexpectatum | Stoev, Moritz & Wesener | 2019 | A callipodidan millipede | Burmanopetalum inexpectatum |

==== Chordeumatida ====
| Taxon | Authority | Year described | Notes | image |
|---|---|---|---|---|
| Heterochordeuma liae | Su, Cai & Huang | 2024 | A heterochordeumatid millipede | |

==== Platydesmida ====
| Taxon | Authority | Year described | Notes | image |
|---|---|---|---|---|
| Andrognathus burmiticus | Moritz & Wesener | 2019 | An andrognathid millipede | |

==== Polydesmida ====
| Taxon | Authority | Year described | Notes | image |
|---|---|---|---|---|
| Monstrodesmus grimaldii | Su, Cai & Huang | 2022 | A trichopolydesmid millipede | |
| Propolydesmus cretaceus | Su, Cai & Huang | 2023 | A polydesmid millipede | |

==== Polyxenida ====
| Taxon | Authority | Year described | Notes | image |
|---|---|---|---|---|
| Pauropsxenus extraneus | Su, Cai & Huang | 2020 | A polyxenid millipede. | |
| Pauropsxenus ordinatus | Su, Cai & Huang | 2020 | A polyxenid millipede. | |
| Phryssonotus burmiticus | Cockerell | 1917 | A synxenid millipede | |

==== Siphoniulida ====
| Taxon | Authority | Year described | Notes | image |
|---|---|---|---|---|
| Siphoniulus muelleri | Liu, Rühr & Wesener | 2017 | A siphoniulid millipede. | |
| Siphoniulus preciosus | Liu, Rühr & Wesener | 2017 | A siphoniulid millipede. | |

==== Siphonophorida ====
| Taxon | Authority | Year described | Notes | image |
|---|---|---|---|---|
| Siphonophora hui | Jiang et al. | 2019 | A siphonophorid sucking millipede. | |
| Siphonorhinus globosus | Su, Cai & Huang | 2024 | A siphonorhinid millipede. | |
| Siphonorhinus peculiaris | Su, Cai & Huang | 2024 | A siphonorhinid millipede. | |

==== Spirostreptida ====
| Taxon | Authority | Year described | Notes | image |
|---|---|---|---|---|
| Electrocambala cretacea | Moritz & Wesener | 2021 | A member of Cambalidea. | |
| Electrocambala ornata | Moritz & Wesener | 2021 | A member of Cambalidea. | |
| Kachincambala distorta | Moritz & Wesener | 2021 | A member of Cambalidea. | |
| Kachincambala muelleri | Moritz & Wesener | 2021 | A member of Cambalidea. | |

=== "Entognatha" ===
==== Entomobryomorpha ====
| Taxon | Authority | Year described | Notes | image |
|---|---|---|---|---|
| Burmisotoma lamellifera | Christiansen & Nascimbene | 2006 | An isotomid springtail | |
| Cretacentomobrya burma | Christiansen & Nascimbene | 2006 | A praentomobryid springtail | |
| Praentomobrya avita | Christiansen & Nascimbene | 2006 | A praentomobryid springtail | |
| Proisotoma pettersonae | Christiansen & Nascimbene | 2006 | An isotomid springtail | |
| Propachyotoma conica | Christiansen & Nascimbene | 2006 | An isotomid springtail | |
| Protodesoria granda | Christiansen & Nascimbene | 2006 | An isotomid springtail | |
| Protoisotoma burma | Christiansen & Nascimbene | 2006 | An isotomid springtail | |
| Villusisotoma brevis | Christiansen & Nascimbene | 2006 | An isotomid springtail | |
| Villusisotoma longa | Christiansen & Nascimbene | 2006 | An isotomid springtail | |

==== Poduromorpha ====
| Taxon | Authority | Year described | Notes | image |
|---|---|---|---|---|
| Protodontella minicornis | Christiansen & Nascimbene | 2006 | An odontellid springtail | |

==== Symphypleona ====
| Taxon | Authority | Year described | Notes | image |
|---|---|---|---|---|
| Grinnellia ventis | Christiansen & Nascimbene | 2006 | A sminthurid springtail | |
| Mucrovirga incompleta | Christiansen & Nascimbene | 2006 | A sminthurid springtail | |
| Sminthurconus grimaldi | Christiansen & Nascimbene | 2006 | A sminthurid springtail | |
| Sminthuricinus deceptus | Christiansen & Nascimbene | 2006 | A sminthurid springtail | |

=== Malacostraca ===
==== Decapoda ====
| Taxon | Authority | Year described | Notes | image |
|---|---|---|---|---|
| Cretapsara athanata | Luque in Luque et al. | 2021 | A crab belonging to the group Eubrachyura and to the family Cretapsaridae. | |
| Xiaopenaeus electrinus | Xing et al. | 2021 | A member of the family Penaeidae. | |

==== Isopoda ====
| Taxon | Authority | Year described | Notes | image |
|---|---|---|---|---|
| Cryptolacruma nidis | Schädel et al. | 2021 | A member of Epicaridea. | |
| Electrolana madelineae | Schädel, Hyžný & Haug | 2021 | A member of Cymothoida, possibly a species of Cirolana. | |
| Metacirolana jimlowryi | Bruce & Rodcharoen | 2023 | A member of the family Cirolanidae. | |
| Myanmariscus deboiseae | Broly, Maillet & Ross | 2015 | A possible styloniscid woodlouse. | |
| Palaeoarmadillo microsoma | Poinar | 2018 | An armadillid woodlouse. | |

==== Tanaidacea ====
| Taxon | Authority | Year described | Notes | image |
|---|---|---|---|---|
| Tanaidaurum kachinensis | Pazinato, Müller & Haug | 2023 | | |

=== Ostracoda ===
| Taxon | Authority | Year described | Notes |
|---|---|---|---|
| Electrocypria burmitei | Wang, Matzke-Karasz & Horne | 2022 | A candonid ostracod. |
| Myanmarcypris hui | Wang et al. | 2020 | A candonid ostracod. |
| Sanyuania sp. | Wang et al. | 2020 | A loxoconchid cytheroid. |
| Thalassocypria sp. | Wang et al. | 2020 | A candonid ostracod. |

=== Symphyla ===
==== Scolopendrellidae ====
| Taxon | Authority | Year described | Notes | image |
|---|---|---|---|---|
| Symphylella patrickmuelleri | Moritz & Wesener | 2017 | A scolopendrellid pseudocentipede. | |

== Mollusca ==
=== Cephalopoda ===
==== Ammonitida ====
| Taxon | Authority | Year described | Notes | image |
|---|---|---|---|---|
| Puzosia (Bhimaites) species | N/A | "2019" | An immature Puzosia (Bhimaites) species dead shell Likely entombed as shoreline debris | Puzosia (Bhimaites) species |

=== Gastropoda ===
==== "Architaenioglossa" ====
| Taxon | Authority | Year described | Notes | image |
|---|---|---|---|---|
| Archaeocyclotus brevivillosus | Bichain et al. | 2022 | A cyclophorid land snail | |
| Archaeocyclotus plicatula | Asato & Hirano in Hirano et al. | 2019 | A cyclophorid land snail | Archaeocyclotus plicatula |
| Burminella artiukhini | Balashov, Perkovsky & Vasilenko | 2021 | A land snail possessing morphological traits intermediate between members of the family Pupinidae and other members of Cyclophoroidea. | |
| Coptocheilus electrothauma | (Asato & Hirano in Hirano et al.) | 2019 | A species of Coptocheilus. Originally described as Schistoloma electrothauma. | Coptocheilus electrothauma |
| Coptocheilus kachinensis | Yu, Zhuo & Páll-Gergely | 2022 | A species of Coptocheilus. | |
| Cretadiostoma caperatum | Yu, Zhuo & Páll-Gergely | 2022 | A member of the family Pupinidae. | |
| Cretadiostoma umbilicarinatum | Yu, Zhuo & Páll-Gergely | 2022 | A member of the family Pupinidae. | |
| Cretatortulosa cretakachinensis | Yu, Salvador & Jarzembowski | 2021 | A pupinid land snail | |
| Cretatortulosa gignens | Jochum, Yu & Neubauer | 2021 | A pupinid land snail | |
| Eotrichophorus kachin | Bullis et al. | 2020 | A cyclophorid land snail | |
| Euthema annae | Balashov | 2020 | A diplommatinid land snail | |
| Euthema hesoana | Asato & Hirano in Hirano et al. | 2019 | A diplommatinid land snail | Euthema hesoana |
| Euthema truncatellina | Balashov, Perkovsky & Vasilenko | 2020 | A diplommatinid land snail | |
| Hirsuticyclus canaliculatus | Yu | 2021 | A cyclophorid land snail | |
| Hirsuticyclus electrum | Neubauer, Xing & Jochum | 2019 | A cyclophorid land snail | |
| Lagocheilus cretaspira | Asato & Hirano in Hirano et al. | 2019 | A cyclophorid land snail | Lagocheilus cretaspira |
| Lagocheilus electrospira | Asato & Hirano in Hirano et al. | 2019 | A cyclophorid land snail. Might be a species of Eotrichophorus. | Lagocheilus electrospira |
| Macropupina electricus | Bullis et al. | 2020 | A pupinid land snail. | |
| Paleodiplommatina spelomphalos | Bullis et al. | 2020 | A diplommatinid land snail. Might be a species of Euthema. | |
| Perissocyclos kyrtostoma | Bullis et al. | 2020 | A cyclophorid land snail. | |
| Pseudopomatias lyui | (Yu, Wang & Jarzembowski) | 2019 | A cyclophorid land snail, first as "Epitonium (Papyriscala) lyui" | |
| Pseudopomatias zhuoi | (Yu, Wang & Jarzembowski) | 2019 | A cyclophorid land snail, first as "Epitonium (Epitonium) zhuoi" | |
| Pulchraspira teneristoma | Yu, Salvador & Jarzembowski | 2021 | A diplommatinid land snail | |
| Rhaphaulus zhuoi | Yu, Salvador & Jarzembowski | 2021 | A pupinid land snail | |
| Xenostoma lophopleura | Bullis et al. | 2020 | Originally described as a pupinid land snail. Might be a species of Euthema instead. | |

==== Heterobranchia ====
| Taxon | Authority | Year described | Notes | image |
|---|---|---|---|---|
| Galba prima | Yu, Neubauer & Jochum | 2021 | A species of Galba. | |
| Mathilda | N/A | "2019" | 2 dead shells likely entombed as shoreline debris | |
| Truncatellina dilatatus | Yu | 2020 | Originally described as a species of Truncatellina. Might be a species of Euthema instead. | |

==== Littorinimorpha ====
| Taxon | Authority | Year described | Notes | image |
|---|---|---|---|---|
| Assiminea striatura | Bullis et al. | 2020 | An assimineid land snail | |

==== Neritimorpha ====
| Taxon | Authority | Year described | Notes | image |
|---|---|---|---|---|
| ?Hydrocena praecursor | Yu & Neubauer | 2021 | A member of the family Hydrocenidae. | |
| Panneritina ambrae | Salvador & Yu | 2022 | A member of the family Neritidae. | |

=== Bivalvia ===
| Taxon | Authority | Year described | Notes | image |
|---|---|---|---|---|
| Palaeolignopholas | Bolotov et al. | 2021 | A member of the family Pholadidae | |

== Nematoda ==
=== Chromadorea ===
==== Rhabditida ====
| Taxon | Authority | Year described | Notes | image |
|---|---|---|---|---|
| Cretodiplogaster termitophilous | Poinar | 2011 | A rhabditid nematode of uncertain placement | |
| Palaeocosmocerca burmanica | Poinar | 2011 | A cosmocercid nematode | |
| Proheterorhabditis burmanicus | Poinar | 2011 | A heterorhabditid nematode | Proheterorhabditis burmanicus next to host beetle |

=== Enoplea ===
==== Mermithida ====
| Taxon | Authority | Year described | Notes | image |
|---|---|---|---|---|
| Cretacimermis adelphe | Luo & Poinar in Luo et al. | 2023 | A mermithid nematode | |
| Cretacimermis aphidophilus | Poinar | 2017 | A mermithid nematode | |
| Cretacimermis calypta | Luo & Poinar in Luo et al. | 2023 | A mermithid nematode | |
| Cretacimermis cecidomyiae | Luo & Poinar in Luo et al. | 2023 | A mermithid nematode | |
| Cretacimermis chironomae | Poinar | 2011 | A mermithid nematode | |
| Cretacimermis dolor | Fang, Poinar & Luo in Fang et al. | 2024 | A mermithid nematode | |
| Cretacimermis directa | Luo & Poinar in Luo et al. | 2023 | A mermithid nematode | |
| Cretacimermis incredibilis | Luo & Poinar in Luo et al. | 2023 | A mermithid nematode | |
| Cretacimermis longa | Luo & Poinar in Luo et al. | 2023 | A mermithid nematode | |
| Cretacimermis manicapsoci | Luo & Poinar in Luo et al. | 2023 | A mermithid nematode | |
| Cretacimermis perforissi | Luo & Poinar in Luo et al. | 2023 | A mermithid nematode | |
| Cretacimermis protus | Poinar & Buckley | 2006 | A mermithid nematode | |
| Cretacimermis psoci | Luo & Poinar in Luo et al. | 2023 | A mermithid nematode | |

=== Secernentea ===
==== Aphelenchida ====
| Taxon | Authority | Year described | Notes | image |
|---|---|---|---|---|
| Cretaciaphelenchoides burmensis | Poinar | 2011 | An aphelenchoidid nematode | |

==== Oxyurida ====
| Taxon | Authority | Year described | Notes | image |
|---|---|---|---|---|
| Paleothelastoma tipulae | Poinar | 2011 | A thelastomatid nematode | |

== Nematomorpha ==
=== Gordioidea ===
| Taxon | Authority | Year described | Notes | image |
|---|---|---|---|---|
| Cretachordodes burmitis | Poinar & Buckley | 2006 | A chordodid Gordian worm | |

== Onychophora ==
| Taxon | Authority | Year described | Notes | image |
|---|---|---|---|---|
| Cretoperipatus burmiticus | Engel & Grimaldi | 2002 | A peripatid velvet worm | Cretoperipatus burmiticus (artist reconstruction) |

== Vertebrata ==
=== Amphibia ===
==== Allocaudata ====
| Taxon | Authority | Year described | Notes | image |
|---|---|---|---|---|
| Yaksha perettii | Daza et al. | 2020 | An albanerpetontid | |

==== Anura ====
| Taxon | Authority | Year described | Notes | image |
|---|---|---|---|---|
| Electrorana limoae | Xing et al. | 2018 | A tropical frog | |

=== Reptilia ===
==== Archosauria ====
| Taxon | Authority | Year described | Notes | image |
|---|---|---|---|---|
| Coelurosauria | Xing et al. | 2016 | Preserved tail with feathers | |
| Elektorornis chenguangi | Xing et al. | 2019 | An enantiornithean avialan, known from a preserved wing and foot with a long toe. | |
| Enantiornithes | Multiple | Various | Several partial wings and feet, and more completely preserved juveniles | |
| Fortipesavis prehendens | Clark & O'Connor | 2021 | An enantiornithean avialan | |

==== Squamata ====
| Taxon | Authority | Year described | Notes | image |
|---|---|---|---|---|
| Barlochersaurus winhtini | Daza et al. | 2018 | A tiny possible stem-anguimorph | |
| Carinasquama rusmithii | Daza et al. | 2026 | A probable gekkonomorph | |
| Cretaceogekko burmae | Arnold & Poinar | 2008 | A gecko | |
| Electroscincus zedi | Daza et al. | 2024 | A skink | |
| Oculudentavis khaungraae | Xing et al. | 2020 | A probable stem-squamate | |
| Oculudentavis naga | Bolet et al. | 2021 | A probable stem-squamate | |
| Protodraco monocoli | Wagner et al. | 2021 | An agamid lizard | |
| Retinosaurus hkamtiensis | Čerňanský et al. | 2022 | A possible pan-xantusiid | |
| Xiaophis myanmarensis | Xing et al. | 2018 | An embryo or neonate snake of uncertain placement | |
| Squamata | Daza et al. | 2016 | Several unnamed squamate specimens varying from largely complete to isolated limbs, assignable to various families | |

== Ichnotaxa ==
=== Insecta ===
==== Dictyoptera ====
| Ichnotaxon | Authority | Year described | Notes | image |
|---|---|---|---|---|
| Blattocoprolites mesoblattamaxi | Hinkelman in Hinkelman & Vršanská | 2020 | A mesoblattinid cockroach coprolite. Associated with Mesoblatta maxi and Chlamydomonas hanublikanus | |

=== Mollusca ===
==== Bivalvia ====
| Ichnotaxon | Authority | Year described | Notes | image |
|---|---|---|---|---|
| Teredolites clavatus | Leymerie | 1842 | pholadid burrowing crypts in the amber nodules, first described from Burmese amber as the fungus "Palaeoclavaria burmitis" | Teredolites clavatus |
