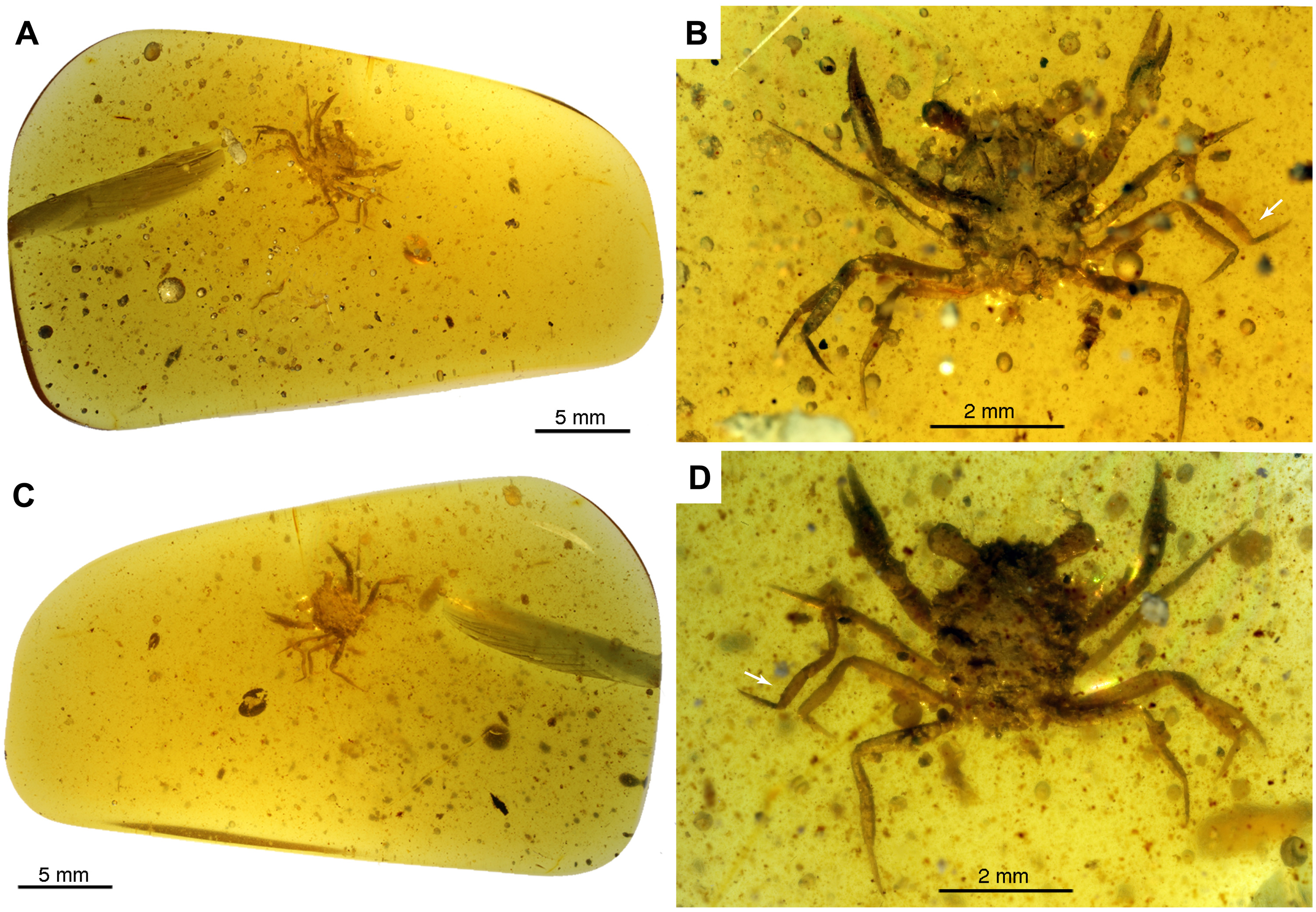
- Image of the amber specimen

Scientific classification
- Kingdom: Animalia
- Phylum: Arthropoda
- Clade: Pancrustacea
- Class: Malacostraca
- Order: Decapoda
- Suborder: Pleocyemata
- Infraorder: Brachyura
- Section: Eubrachyura
- Family: †Cretapsaridae; Luque in Luque et al., 2021
- Genus: †Cretapsara; Luque in Luque et al., 2021
- Species: †C. athanata

Binomial name
- †Cretapsara athanata Luque in Luque et al., 2021

= Cretapsara =

Cretapsara Temporal range: Late Cretaceous (Cenomanian), 99 Ma

Extinct crab genus

Cretapsara (lit. 'Cretaceous Apsara') is an extinct genus of true crab from the Late Cretaceous of Myanmar. The genus contains a single species, Cretapsara athanata, known from one complete specimen preserved in Burmese amber dated to the early Cenomanian period, 99 million years ago.

== Etymology ==
The genus name Cretapsara is a portmanteau of 'Cretaceous', the geological period, and 'Apsara', nymph-like spirits of the clouds and waters in South and Southeast Asian mythology, especially in Hindu and Buddhist culture. The species binomial name athanata derives from the Greek word 'athanatos' meaning immortal or undying, in reference to the lifelike preservation of the specimen in amber, as if frozen in time.

== Discovery ==
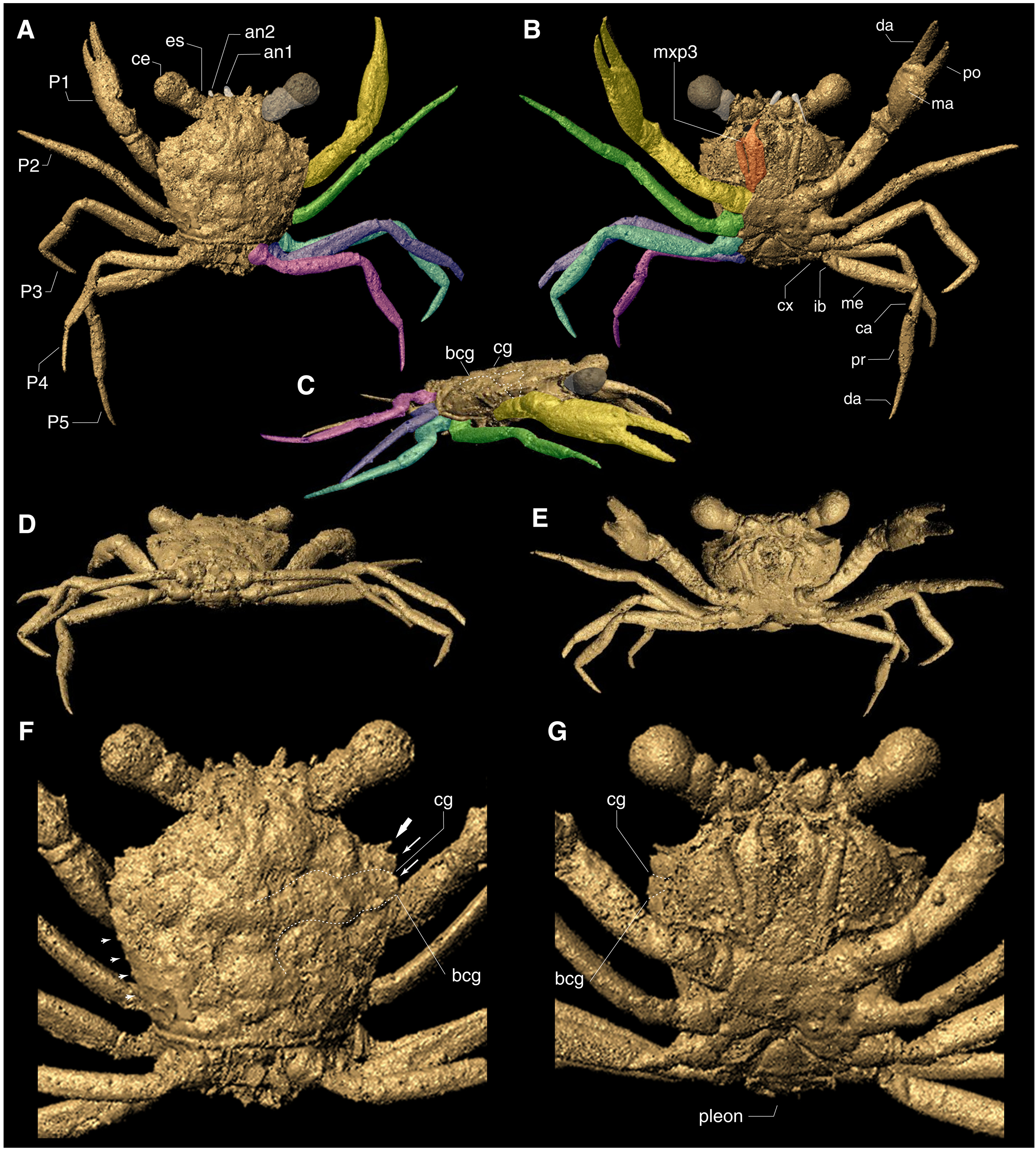
CT scans of Cretapsara athanata

Described in 2021 by Javier Luque et al., the genus is known from a single amber specimen discovered in the prolific Hukawng Valley, where nearly all Burmese amber originates. This holotype specimen LYAM-9 is housed in Longyin Amber Museum in Yunnan, China. CT scans of the amber have rendered detailed 3D reconstructions for study.

The discovery was notable as being both the oldest and most complete fossilized crab ever found, and the first from amber; the preservation of a crustacean, or any marine organism, in amber is a rare occurrence due to the method of fossilization requiring both terrestrial and arboreal capture.

== Description ==
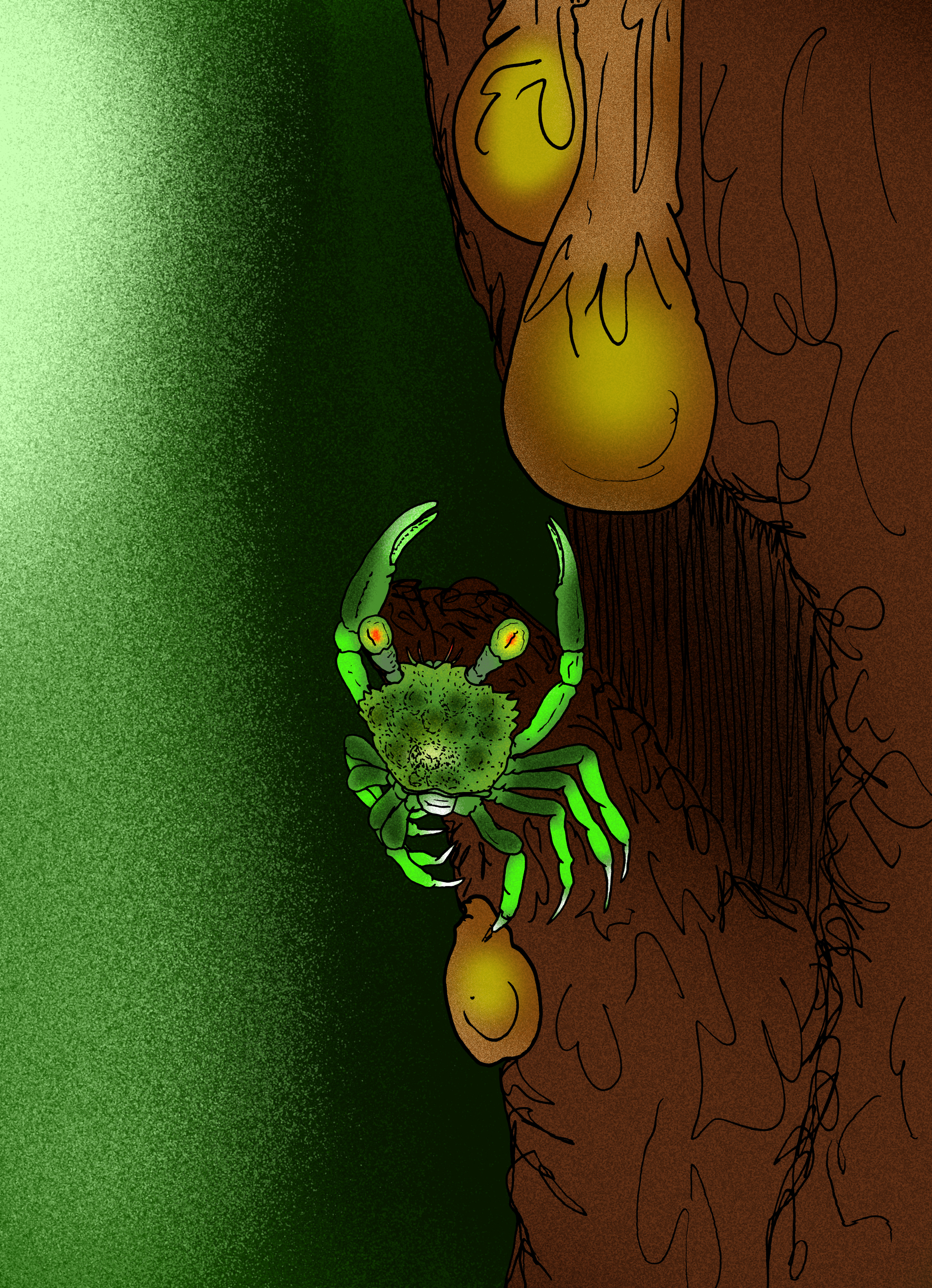
Restoration of the specimen being captured in amber

Cretapsara lived 99 million years ago during the Late Cretaceous (Cenomanian) in modern day Myanmar. It was described as a member of Brachyura, the 'true crabs', and Eubrachyura (one of the earliest eubrachyurans known), within its own incertae sedis family Cretapsaridae.

The holotype specimen is considered a juvenile, measuring 5 millimetres (0.20 in) across in leg-span, and 2 millimetres (0.079 in) in carapace diameter. Its preservation in amber, presence of gills, and lack of lung tissue suggest it was partially amphibious, and possibly arboreal in addition to being aquatic. This is noteworthy as evidence of non-marine crabs was only previously known as far back as 50 million years ago in the Eocene, proving that such adaptations were already established by around 100 million years ago.

The crab was remarkably well preserved; in addition to internal gills, digital reconstructions from CT scans have revealed complex antennae, large compound eyes, and mouthparts with fine hairs, among other delicate tissues. It has been described as 'modern-looking' in terms of general crab physiology.

Cretapsara likely lived around brackish or fresh water, in a coastal or riverine environment with woody plants present. It shared its Cretaceous Southeast Asian environment with multiple other organisms found in Burmese amber, including fellow decapod Xiaopenaeus electrinus (the first shrimp discovered in amber), and a possible odonatan insect whose wing is a syninclusion with the Cretapsara holotype.

== See also ==
- 2021 in arthropod paleontology
- Paleobiota of Burmese amber
- Carcinisation
