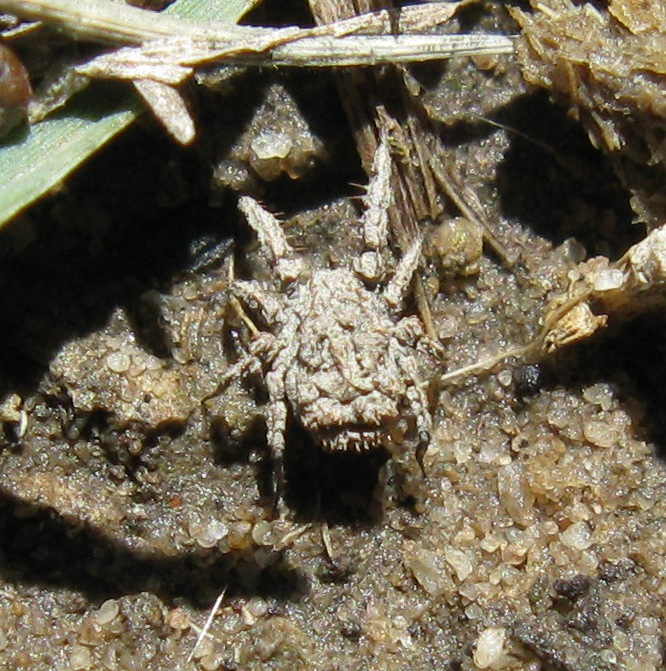
- Predatory rake mite (Caeculidae)

Scientific classification
- Kingdom: Animalia
- Phylum: Arthropoda
- Subphylum: Chelicerata
- Class: Arachnida
- Order: Trombidiformes
- Suborder: Prostigmata
- Infraorder: Anystina
- Superfamily: Caeculoidea
- Family: Caeculidae

= Caeculidae =

Caeculidae Temporal range: Cenomanian–present

Family of mites

Caeculidae, also known as rake-legged mites, is a family of mites in the order Trombidiformes, the only family of the superfamily Caeculoidea. There are about 9 genera and about 100 described species in Caeculidae which occur world-wide. The oldest records of the family are from the Cenomanian aged Burmese amber, belonging to the extant genus Procaeculus.

== Genera ==
These six genera belong to the family Caeculidae:

- Allocaeculus Franz, 1952
- Andocaeculus Coineau, 1974
- Caeculus Dufour, 1832
- Calocaeculus Coineau, 1974
- Microcaeculus Franz, 1952
- Neocaeculus Coineau, 1967
- Procaeculus Jacot 1936
