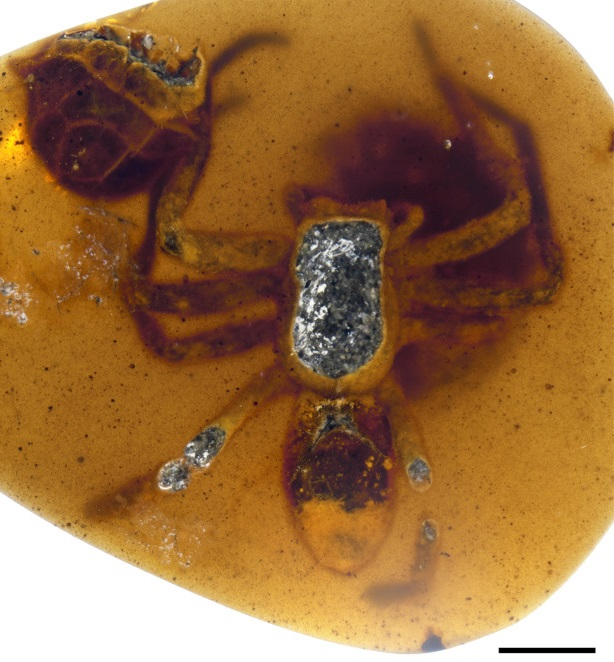

Scientific classification
- Kingdom: Animalia
- Phylum: Arthropoda
- Subphylum: Chelicerata
- Class: Arachnida
- Order: Araneae
- Infraorder: Araneomorphae
- Superfamily: Palpimanoidea
- Family: †Lagonomegopidae; Eskov and Wunderlich 1995

Genera
- See text

= Lagonomegopidae =

Lagonomegopidae Temporal range: Albian–Campanian

Extinct family of spiders

Lagonomegopidae is an extinct family of spiders known from the Cretaceous period. Members of the family are distinguished by a large pair of eyes, positioned on the anterolateral flanks of the carapace, with the rest of the eyes being small. They have generally been considered members of Palpimanoidea, but this has recently been questioned. Members of the family are known from the late Early Cretaceous (Albian) to near the end of the Late Cretaceous (Campanian) of Eurasia, North America and the Middle East, which was then attached to Africa as part of Gondwana. They are generally assumed to have been free living hunters as opposed to web builders.

== Diagnosis ==
Per Guo and Selden, 2019

Chelicera with several peg teeth on promargin; true teeth present or absent on retromargin. Carapace with a pair of large posterior median eyes situated on anterolateral corner, other eyes tiny. Endites subtriangular, directed across the labium, almost meeting at the midline. Trichobothria present on leg tibia and metatarsus. Three tarsal claws, unpaired claw hook-like. Six spinnerets. Female palpal tarsi lacking a claw.

For the meaning of technical words, refer to the Glossary of spider terms.

== Relationships ==
A phylogenetic analysis conducted in 2021 found that Lagonomegopidae formed the sister group to extant Palpimanoidea.

== Paleobiology ==
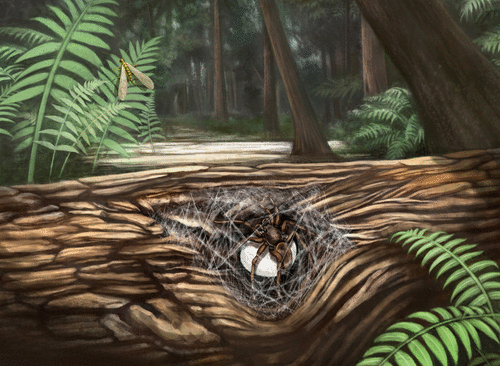
Reconstruction of female lagonomegopid with egg sac

Langonomegopids preserved with associated egg sacs and spiderlings indicate that females likely laid egg sacs in nests or hollows, and the young may have lived with the mother for some time after hatching.

== Genera ==
- †Albiburmops Wunderlich 2017
  - †Albiburmops annulipes Wunderlich 2017 Burmese amber, Myanmar, Cenomanian
- †Archaelagonops Wunderlich 2012
  - †Archaelagonops alavensis Penney 2006 Spanish amber, Albian
  - †Archaelagonops propinquus Wunderlich 2015 Burmese amber, Myanmar, Cenomanian
  - †Archaelagonops salticoides Wunderlich 2012 Burmese amber, Myanmar, Cenomanian
  - †Archaelagonops scorsum Wunderlich 2015 Burmese amber, Myanmar, Cenomanian
- †Cymbiolagonops Wunderlich 2015
  - †Cymbiolagonops cymbiocalcar Wunderlich 2015 Burmese amber, Myanmar, Cenomanian
- †Grandoculus Penney 2004
  - †Grandoculus chemahawinensis Penney 2004 Canadian amber, Campanian
- †Hiatomegops Guo, Selden and Ren, 2021
  - †Hiatomegops spinalis Guo, Selden and Ren, 2021 Burmese amber, Myanmar, Cenomanian
- †Jinjumegops Park et al. 2019
  - †Jinjumegops dalingwateri Park et al. 2019 Jinju Formation, South Korea, Albian
- †Koreamegops Park et al. 2019
  - †Koreamegops samsiki Park et al. 2019 Jinju Formation, South Korea, Albian
- †Lagonoburmops Wunderlich 2012
  - †Lagonoburmops plumosus Wunderlich 2012 Burmese amber, Myanmar, Cenomanian
- †Lagonomegops Eskov and Wunderlich 1995
  - †Lagonomegops americanus Penney 2005 New Jersey amber, Turonian
  - †Lagonomegops cor Pérez-de la Fuente et al. 2013 Spanish amber, Albian
  - †Lagonomegops sukatchevae Eskov and Wunderlich 1995 Taimyr amber, Santonian
  - †Lagonomegops tuber Wunderlich 2015 Burmese amber, Myanmar, Cenomanian
- †Lineaburmops Wunderlich 2015
  - †Lineaburmops beigeli Wunderlich 2015 Burmese amber, Myanmar, Cenomanian
  - †Lineaburmops hirsutipes Wunderlich 2015 Burmese amber, Myanmar, Cenomanian
  - †Lineaburmops maculatus Wunderlich 2015 Burmese amber, Myanmar, Cenomanian
- †Myanlagonops Wunderlich 2012
  - †Myanlagonops gracilipes Wunderlich 2012 Burmese amber, Myanmar, Cenomanian
- †Odontomegops Guo and Selden 2019
  - †Odontomegops titan Guo and Selden 2019 Burmese amber, Myanmar, Cenomanian
- †Parviburmops Wunderlich 2015
  - †Parviburmops bigibber Wunderlich 2017 Burmese amber, Myanmar, Cenomanian
  - †Parviburmops brevipalpus Wunderlich 2015 Burmese amber, Myanmar, Cenomanian
- †Paxillomegops Wunderlich 2015
  - †Paxillomegops brevipes Wunderlich 2015 Burmese amber, Myanmar, Cenomanian
  - †Paxillomegops cornutus Wunderlich 2017 Burmese amber, Myanmar, Cenomanian
  - †Paxillomegops longipes Wunderlich 2015 Burmese amber, Myanmar, Cenomanian
- †Picturmegops Wunderlich 2015
  - †Picturmegops signatus Wunderlich 2015 Burmese amber, Myanmar, Cenomanian
- †Planimegops Wunderlich 2017
  - †Planimegops parvus Wunderlich 2017 Burmese amber, Myanmar, Cenomanian
- †Scopomegops Guo, Selden and Ren, 2021
  - †Scopomegops fax Guo, Selden and Ren, 2021 Burmese amber, Myanmar, Cenomanian
- †Soplaogonomegops Pérez-de la Fuente et al. 2013
  - †Soplaogonomegops unzuei Pérez-de la Fuente et al. 2013 Spanish amber, Albian
- †Spinomegops Pérez-de la Fuente et al. 2013
  - †Spinomegops aragonensis Pérez-de la Fuente et al. 2013 Spanish amber, Albian
  - †Spinomegops arcanus Pérez-de la Fuente et al. 2013 Spanish amber, Albian
- †Zarqagonomegops Kaddumi 2007
  - †Zarqagonomegops wunderlichi Kaddumi 2007 Jordanian amber, Albian
