= Cretacimermis =

Cretacimermis Temporal range: Cretaceous

Scientific classification
- Domain: Eukaryota
- Kingdom: Animalia
- Phylum: Nematoda
- Class: Enoplea
- Order: Mermithida
- Family: Mermithidae
- Genus: †Cretacimermis; Poinar in Luo et al., 2023

Species
- See text

Synonyms
- Cretacimermis Poinar, 2001 (invalidly established)

Extinct genus of roundworms

Cretacimermis is a collective group genus of fossil mermithid nematodes from the Cretaceous that cannot be placed in extant genera.

== Species ==
Species:

| Scientific name | Age | Type locality | Country | Host | Notes |
|---|---|---|---|---|---|
| Cretacimermis adelphe Luo & Poinar in Luo et al., 2023 | Late Cretaceous (Cenomanian) | Burmese amber | Myanmar | Dermaptera | |
| Cretacimermis aphidophilus Poinar, 2017 | Late Cretaceous (Cenomanian) | Burmese amber | Myanmar | Caulinus burmitis Poinar & Brown, 2005 (Hemiptera, Burmitaphididae) | |
| Cretacimermis calypta Luo & Poinar in Luo et al., 2023 | Late Cretaceous (Cenomanian) | Burmese amber | Myanmar | Burmaphlebia reifi Bechly & Poinar, 2013 (Odonata, Burmaphlebiidae) | |
| Cretacimermis cecidomyiae Luo & Poinar in Luo et al., 2023 | Late Cretaceous (Cenomanian) | Burmese amber | Myanmar | Diptera, Cecidomyiidae | |
| Cretacimermis chironomae Poinar, 2011 | Late Cretaceous (Cenomanian) | Burmese amber | Myanmar | Diptera, Chironomidae | |
| Cretacimermis directa Luo & Poinar in Luo et al., 2023 | Late Cretaceous (Cenomanian) | Burmese amber | Myanmar | Orthoptera, Grylloidea | |
| Cretacimermis dolor Fang, Poinar & Luo in Fang et al., 2024 | Late Cretaceous (Cenomanian) | Burmese amber | Myanmar | Araneae, Haplogynae, Segestriidae? | |
| Cretacimermis incredibilis Luo & Poinar in Luo et al., 2023 | Late Cretaceous (Cenomanian) | Burmese amber | Myanmar | Archaeognatha | |
| Cretacimermis libani (Poinar et al., 1994) Poinar, 2001 | Early Cretaceous (Barremian) | Lebanese amber | Lebanon | Diptera, Chironomidae | Originally named Heleidomermis libani Poinar et al., 1994. |
| Cretacimermis longa Luo & Poinar in Luo et al., 2023 | Late Cretaceous (Cenomanian) | Burmese amber | Myanmar | Blattodea, Mesoblattinidae | |
| Cretacimermis manicapsoci Luo & Poinar in Luo et al., 2023 | Late Cretaceous (Cenomanian) | Burmese amber | Myanmar | Psocodea, Manicapsocidae | |
| Cretacimermis perforissi Luo & Poinar in Luo et al., 2023 | Late Cretaceous (Cenomanian) | Burmese amber | Myanmar | Hemiptera, Perforissidae | |
| Cretacimermis protus Poinar & Buckley, 2006 | Late Cretaceous (Cenomanian) | Burmese amber | Myanmar | Diptera, Ceratopogonidae | |
| Cretacimermis psoci Luo & Poinar in Luo et al., 2023 | Late Cretaceous (Cenomanian) | Burmese amber | Myanmar | Psocodea, Compsocidae | |

== See also ==
- Heydenius
