= Fossilcalcaridae =

Fossilcalcaridae Temporal range: Cenomanian

Scientific classification
- Domain: Eukaryota
- Kingdom: Animalia
- Phylum: Arthropoda
- Subphylum: Chelicerata
- Class: Arachnida
- Order: Araneae
- Infraorder: Mygalomorphae
- Clade: Avicularioidea
- Family: †Fossilcalcaridae; Wunderlich, 2015
- Genus: †Fossilcalcar; Wunderlich, 2015
- Species: †F. praeteritus

Binomial name
- †Fossilcalcar praeteritus Wunderlich, 2015

Extinct family of spiders

Fossilcalcaridae is an extinct Mygalomorphae spider family in the clade Avicularioidea containing the single species Fossilcalcar praeteritus. The family genus and species were described in 2015 from a male fossil entombed in Cretaceous age Burmese amber.
