= Gračanica paleontological site =

Paleontological site near Bugojno, Bosnia and Herzegovnia

Gračanica Site
- Stratigraphic range: Middle Miocene, Langhian 15.8–15.4 Ma
- Type: Site
- Unit of: Bugojno Basin
- Overlies: Güvendik Formation
- Thickness: 40 metres (130 ft)

Lithology
- Primary: mudstone, sandstone, marl, limestone, lignites
- Other: coal

Location
- Region: Central Bosnia Canton
- Country: Bosnia and Herzegovina

Gračanica Site (pronounced [ɡratʃǎnitsa]) is a paleontological site located within an open coal mine near Bugojno, Bosnia and Herzegovina with fossils dating to the middle Miocene. There are a large number of groups found at the site including mammals, reptiles, fish, and invertebrates though mammals are only found at the lower layers of the coal mine. A transition from a swampy woodland environment to a more open lake environment is preserved at the site. By the upper layers of the site, the area represents a part of the Bugojno palaeolake, a lake that was once a part of the Dinarides Lake System.

== History ==
Coal has been collected from the pit since 1938 though it didn't become an opencast mine till 1977. Before paleontological work had begun at the site, the presence of large mammal fossils had been known due to chance finds by miners at the site. To this day, most large mammal fossil at the site are found by them. Paleontological collection of the mine started in 2007 where a team with O. Mandic along with a number of small mammal specialists to screen wash the sediment though not much turned up in their time there. Fieldwork on the section wouldn't start till 2008 where a team with O. Mandic, M. Mandic, de Leeuw and W. Krijgsman present marked two sections to conduct research.

Starting the year before, O. Mandic had begun the collection of fossil mollusks from the deposits; continuing collections in 2008, 2009, 2016 and 2017. In 2009, O. Mandic also collected sediment from throughout the entire section for pollen and ostracod analysis. It wouldn't be until 2017 that a digging crew would enter the site to conduct a digging campaign where 70 kg of sediment were screen washed though only small molluscs and gyrogonites were present in these sections. In 2019, a small amount of fossil collection was done by the Jurassica Museum in Porrentruy. Most large mammal fossils found at the site have been found by miners by chance. Since 2020, a number of papers have been published about these larger mammal fossils along with fossils of plants, birds, reptiles, fish, amphibians, and invertebrates.

== Description ==
The site is found within the Gračanica open cast mine located around 10 km south-southeast of the city of Bugojno, with the sediment being a part of the large, intramountainous Bugojno Basin. It has a thickness of around 40 m with the lower 20 being the strata that contain the brown coal and dark lignites collected by the company “Gračanica”. Along with the dark lignites, the mammal fossils of the site along with a crocodilian come from these lower layers. The upper section, where the other animal and plant fossils are found, lacks lignites and is made up of light-colored sandstones, siltstones, marls, and limestones. During the Neogene, the basin went through 3 lacustrine deposition cycles with the Gračanica site representing the third (referred to as the deposition cycle of Čičić). At the site, this cycle lays on the Permian and Triassic basement of the area. Throughout the section, there are changes in the transgressive lacustrine successions represented by both lateral and vertical facies.

== Dating ==
The Gračanica site dated to the middle Miocene though in the past there had been problems getting the exact age of the material . Originally, the mollusk fauna suggests an age of less than 15 million years; the, at the time, small amount of mammal fossils point towards a slightly later date of during MN4-6 (16.6-13.7 Ma). On top of that, the suid fauna of the site suggested an even earlier date of 14.0 and 13.7 Ma. Paleoclimate proxies also suggest a different age of the site being between 14.8 and 13.8 Ma. Since the originally studies, more small mammals have been found suggesting a dates of between 15.8─15.4 Ma. it can be determined that the sediment was deposited over a range of 200 thousand years.

== Paleobiota ==
=== Actinopterygii ===
Genus	Species	Notes	Image
Barbini indet. (aff. Barbus)			
Miovalencia	M. bugojnensis		
Wilsonilebias	W. langhianus		
Wilsonilebias	W. rotundascendus		

=== Amphibia ===
Genus	Species	Notes	Image
Chelotriton	C. sp		
Latonia	L. sp		

=== Artiodactyla ===
Genus	Species	Notes	Image
Bunolistriodon	B. latidens		
Choeromorus	C. lemuroides		
Conohyus	C. simorrensis		
Dorcatherium	D. vindebonense		
Eotragus	E ?clavatus		
Giraffokeryx	G. sp.		
Palaeomerycidae indet.			
Tethytragus	?T. sp.		

=== Carnivora ===
Genus	Species	Notes	Image
Amphicyon	A. giganteus		
Hemicyon	H. goeriachensis		
Mustelidae indet.			
Percrocuta	P. miocenica		
Ursavus	U. brevirhinus		

=== Crocodylia ===
Genus	Species	Notes	Image
Diplocynodon	?D. sp.		

=== Crustacea ===
Genus	Species	Notes	Image
Candona	C. cf. suevica		
Cyclocypris	C. cf. ovum		
Cypridopsis	C. cf. biplanata		
Darwinula	D. stevensoni		
Eucypris	?E. sp.		
Fabaeformiscandona	F. cf. pokornyi		
Fabaeformiscandona	F. sp.		
Herpetocypris	?H. sp.		
Mediocypris	M. cf. candonaeformis		
Paralimnocythere	P. rostrata		
Potamon	P. sp.		
Sagmatocythere	S. sp.		
Vestalenula	V. cylindrica		

=== Insecta ===
Genus	Species	Notes	Image
Bibio	B. sp.		
Plecia	P. sp.		

=== Mollusca ===
Genus	Species	Notes	Image
Agriolimacidae gen. et sp. indet.			
Bania	B. goehlichae		
Bania	B. sp.		
Bithynia	B. sp.		
Carychium	C. nouleti		
Cyclothyrella	C. tryoniopsis		
Ferrissia	F. illyrica		
Gyraulus	G. dalmaticus		
Gyraulus	G. pulici		
Illyricocongeria	I. forcakovici		
Lymnaeidae gen. et sp. indet.			
Melanopsis	M. visianiana		
Paradrobacia	P. hrvatovici		
Pisidium	P. bellardii		
Planorbarius	P. mantelli		
Prososthenia	P. krijgsmani		
Theodoxus	T. sinjanus		
Vertigo	V. callosa		
Vertigo	V. diversidens		

=== Perissodactyla ===
Genus	Species	Notes	Image
Anchitherium	A. ezquerrae		
Anchitherium	A. hippoides		
Anisodon	A. cf. grande		
Brachypotherium	B. brachypus		
Hispanotherium	H. cf. matritense		
Lartetotherium	L. sansaniense		
Plesiaceratherium	P. balkanicus		

=== Porifera ===
Genus	Species	Notes	Image
Ephydatia	E. sp		
Ochridaspongia	O. sp		
Potamolepidae indet.			

=== Proboscidea ===
Genus	Species	Notes	Image
Gomphotherium	G. angustidens		
Gomphotherium	cf. G. subtapiroideum		
Prodeinotherium	P. bavaricum		
Protanancus	cf. P. sp.		

=== Rodentia ===
Genus	Species	Notes	Image
Democricetodon	D. gracilis		
Democricetodon	D. mutilus		
Steneofiber	S. depereti		

=== Squamata ===
Genus	Species	Notes	Image
Anguine sp.			

=== Angiospermae ===
Genus	Species	Notes	Image
Cinnamomum	C. polymorphum	A tree from the family Lauraceae known from a single leaf from the site. C. polymorphum was known to be common in riverside and mesophytic forests.	
Dicotylophyllum	D. sp.	A magnoliopsidan of indeterminate placement known from a badly preserved leaf along with fossil wood at the site.	
Myrica	M. cf. laevigata	A plant that can grow as either a shrub or small tree from the family Myricaceae known from a single leaf. Just like modern species of the genus, this plant would have been common in swampy forest environments.	
Rhamnus	"R". warthae	A magnoliopsidan of indeterminate placement known from a single leaf at the site. The species would have been a part of the swampy woodland vegetation.	
Vitis	V. cf. globosa	A vine within the family Vitaceae known from a single seed at the site. The plant would have lived as a part of the forest border vegetation.	

=== Chrysophyta ===
Genus	Species	Notes	Image
Chrysophyte cysts		8-11 morphotypes are present	

=== Charophyta ===
Genus	Species	Notes	Image
Chara	C. molassica notata	Green algae known from 2 gyrogonites found the site.	
Lychnothamnus	L. duplicicarinatus	Green algae known from 30 gyrogonites found the site.	

=== Chlorophyta ===
Genus	Species	Notes	Image
Botryococcus	e.g. B. sp.		
Spirogyra	S. sp.		
Zygnema	Z. sp.		

=== Diatoms ===
Genus	Species	Notes	Image
Ellerbeckia	E. cf. arenaria		
Encyonema	E. sp.		
Epithemia	E. sp.		
Eunotia	E. sp.		
Fragilaria	F. sp.1.		
Fragilaria	F. sp.2.		
Pennate species 1, indet.			
Pennate species 2, indet.			
Staurosirella	S. leptostauron		
Staurosirella	S. pinnata		

=== Gymnospermae ===
Genus	Species	Notes	Image
Glyptostrobus	G. europaeus	A cypress known from two twigs and a cone found at the site. The genus was found in lowland swamp environments during the Neogene.	
Equisetum	E. sp	A horsetail known from multiple incomplete stem sheaths.	

=== Pteridophyta ===
Genus	Species	Notes	Image
Pronephrium	P. stiriacum	A fern in the family Thelypteridaceae known from a single pinna fragment at the site. The genus is mostly found in swampy environments in Europe.	

== Paleoenvironment ==
The Gračanica site is made up of sediments deposits in what was once the Bugojno palaeolake, a part of the Dinarides Lake System. The lake measured around 718 m long and 260 m wide, with the lake being at an altitude of 616 m a.s.l. The water would have came from the Zaneski stream along with direct precipitation and the outflow of the intramontane basin would have gone to the River Vrbas. Throughout the sites, there is a deepening of the body of water with the lowermost section being a woody-lowland swamp (0-8 m) that over time became a marsh (8-20.5 m) and eventually an open lake (20.5–39.5 m).

The climate would have been subtropical to humid with annual mean temperatures most likely ranging from 15 to 18°C with an annual precipitation of between 8-12 cm. Through this transition from a swamp to an open lake, the environment became drier over time. Due to the presence of invertebrates like Potamon, the water temperature would have not been able to get under 0°C during the coldest parts of the year. These temperatures are consistent with others measured in the Central Paratethys during the late Egerian and early Badenian. The forest preserved by the site is most similar to mixed mesophytic forests seen today in places like the southeastern United States and Asia.
