= C. iheringi =

C. iheringi may refer to:

- Callimicra iheringi, a species of jewel beetle in the genus Callimicra
- Callionepion iheringi, a species of snail in the family Megaspiridae
- Camponotus iheringi, a species of ant in the genus Camponotus
- Cauarana iheringi, a species of longhorn beetle
- Ceroplastes iheringi, a species of scale insect in the genus Ceroplastes
- Cetopsorhamdia iheringi, a species of catfish
- Chilina iheringi, a species of snail in the genus Chilina
- Chlamydotheca iheringi, a species of ostracod in the genus Chlamydotheca
- Chrysetaerius iheringi, a species of hister beetle in the subfamily Haeteriinae
- Choeradoplana iheringi, a species of flatworm
- Clinodiplosis iheringi, a species of gall midge in the subfamily Cecidomyiinae
- Conga iheringii, a species of butterfly in the genus Conga
- Craspedus iheringi, a species of rove beetle in the genus Craspedus
- Crematogaster iheringi, a species of ant in the genus Crematogaster
- Cryptops iheringi, a species of centipede in the genus Cryptops
- Cyathea iheringii, a species of tree fern in the genus Cyathea
- Cyclodontina iheringi, a species of snail in the family Cyclodontinidae
