= Lake Ptolemy =

Holocene former lake in Sudan

Coordinates: 19.5°N 26°E

- West Nubian Paleolake, Northern Darfur Megalake
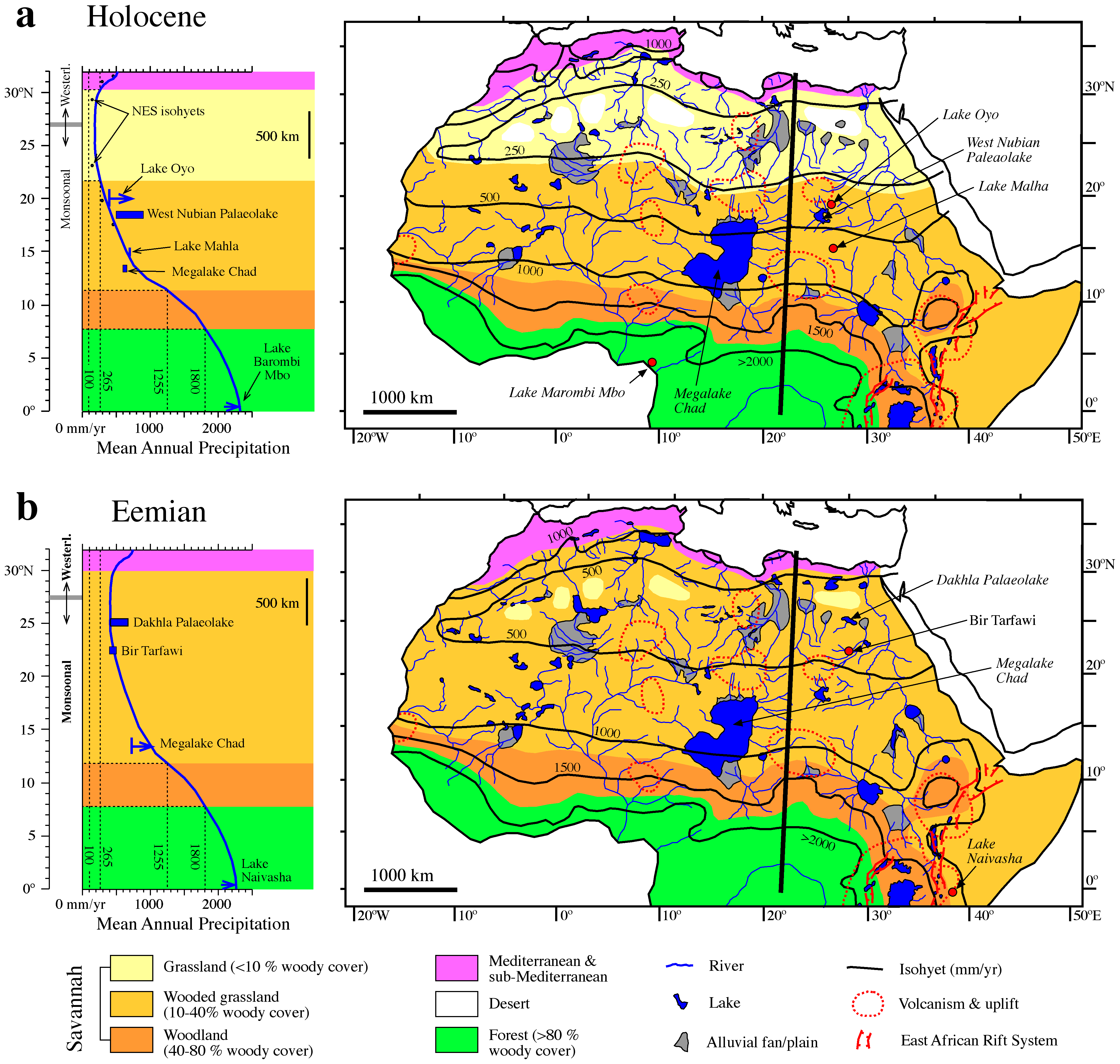
- Map of northern Africa with Lake Ptolemy indicated as West Nubian Paleolake

- Location within Sudan
- Location: Darfur, Sudan
- Type: Former lake Holocene lake 9,100–2,400 BP
- Etymology: Ptolemy
- Part of: Sahara
- Primary inflows: ?
- River sources: ?
- Primary outflows: ?
- Basin countries: Sudan
- Surface area: 8,133–11,230 km^{2} (3,140–4,336 sq mi)
- Max. depth: 15 m (49 ft)
- Water volume: 372–547 km^{3} (89–131 cu mi)
- Salinity: ?
- Surface elevation: 550–555 m (1,804–1,821 ft)
- Max. temperature: ?
- Min. temperature: ?
- Frozen: Never
- Islands: ?

Lake Ptolemy is a former lake in Sudan. This lake formed during the Holocene in the Darfur region, during a time when the monsoon over Africa was stronger. The existence of the lake is dated between about 9,100–2,400 years before present. This lake could have reached a surface area of 30,750 square kilometres (11,870 sq mi), larger than present-day Lake Erie, although estimates of its size vary and it might have been much smaller. The shorelines in some places, insofar as they are recognizable, feature riparian landscapes and reeds. The lake was a freshwater lake replenished by groundwater and runoff from neighbouring mountains and might itself have been the source for the Nubian Sandstone Aquifer System. The lake featured a diverse ecosystem with a number of species, and possibly facilitated the spread of species between the Nile and Lake Chad.

== Name and research history ==
The lake's deposits were first recognized in 1985–1986, but the "chelonide marshes" or "turtle swamp" of Ptolemy almost certainly refer to the former lake. It is also known as "West Nubian lake", "West Nubian Paleolake" and "Northern Darfur Megalake". "Ptolemy lake archipelago" refers to dune fields that were periodically submerged along the eastern shores, forming archipelagos. The lake name was first mentioned in a 1858 map, but its existence became clear only in 1980–1982.

== Geomorphology ==
=== Context ===
During the early and middle Holocene, large lakes such as Lake Chad and Lake Ptolemy developed within the Sahara and river systems such as Wadi Howar flowed, although it is not clear if they were flowing through a still desertic landscape. The formation of these paleolakes was ultimately linked to a stronger African monsoon caused by a higher axial tilt and the perihelion of Earth coinciding with late July and thus the monsoon season. Today the eastern Sahara is among the driest locations on Earth as it is far removed from oceanic moisture sources.

=== Lake ===
Lake Ptolemy is located on the territory of present-day Sudan. Estimates of its size have changed as the quality of regional maps changed: At first, it was believed to have reached surface areas of about 27,000 square kilometres (10,000 sq mi); later research on the basis of more reliable elevation maps suggested that it was no larger than 5,330 square kilometres (2,060 sq mi); later still, newer maps indicated larger surface areas of 8,133 square kilometres (3,140 sq mi) and 11,230 square kilometres (4,340 sq mi) and a volume of 372 cubic kilometres (89 cu mi) and 547 cubic kilometres (131 cu mi), respectively.

Depending on the location, evidence for water levels of 550 metres (1,800 ft) or even 555 metres (1,821 ft) above sea level have been found; in the former case the lake may have occupied an area of no less than 17,864 square kilometres (6,897 sq mi). There is also evidence of shorelines at altitudes of 570–576 metres (1,870–1,890 ft) above sea level; if they reflect the lake reaching that altitude, this stand would reach a surface of 30,750 square kilometres (11,870 sq mi) and a volume of 2,530 cubic kilometres (610 cu mi) at that stage. Such a size is comparable to Canada's largest lake, the Great Bear Lake, and larger than Lake Erie. It would have been up to 83 metres (272 ft) deep. Lower lake stages might have reached 565 metres (1,854 ft) and 560 metres (1,840 ft) elevation, and there is fossil evidence that episodes of shallow water level occurred in the lake. The lake floor in its southern and western sectors reaches 549 metres (1,801 ft) elevation above sea level.

Shorelines developed on Lake Ptolemy's northern margin and the lake submerged two tributary valleys there; the development of dune fields on the western shore makes identification of the shores there difficult and their absence has raised questions about whether the lake actually existed at such large sizes. The shores on the southern and western side developed a riparian zone with vegetation and irregular lakefloor. River deltas formed where wadis entered Lake Ptolemy, and alluvial fans have been identified on the northwestern shores. Chalks formed in Lake Ptolemy generated yardangs, and aragonite, calcite and goethite formed deposits in the adjacent desert, often in swampy areas. Tufa pinnacles formed in the lake, and upon drying playa deposits were left behind.

The lake existed in the area of present-day Wadi Howar in the Darfur Basin. Today the oases of Oyo, Bidi and Nukheila are located on the lake-floor that Lake Ptolemy occupied at maximum highstand. The lake probably resembled present day Lake Chad.

=== Hydrology ===
The lake was nourished by runoff from the Ennedi, Erdi Ma and part of the Kufrah Depression, as well as groundwater; at least one site of the lake floor shows evidence of the release of pressurized water and evidence of higher groundwater levels is widespread in the eastern Sahara. The catchment of the lake covers a surface area of 78,000 square kilometres (30,000 sq mi), with later estimates of 128,802 square kilometres (49,731 sq mi).

This runoff reached the lake through various wadis, many of which entered Lake Ptolemy from the north, such as Wadi Fesh-Fesh. The Ennedi was critical for the water balance of lake, with three tributaries joining it from there. To the northwest the Lake Ptolemy drainage system was bordered by areas that drained north, while to the northeast drainage was northeastward. Unlike Lake Chad/Lake Megachad, Lake Ptolemy was not nourished by rivers from the humid and semi-humid tropics, but solely from regional catchments.

The presence of Asphataria indicates that Lake Ptolemy was a freshwater lake especially close to its inflows, although with occasional brackish phases. Precipitation at the time was about 300 millimetres (12 in) per year.

At a water level of 550 metres (1,800 ft) Lake Ptolemy would have been connected with a paleodrainage system belonging to the Abyad Plateau. A connection between Lake Ptolemy and Wadi Howar which drains to the Nile is possible. but not proven. At water levels of 577–583 metres (1,893–1,913 ft) Lake Ptolemy would overflow into Wadi Arid.

== Biology ==
Lake Ptolemy featured a diverse ecosystem, especially in its southwestern sector where tributaries formed river deltas with diverse environments; these include banks, reed beds, shallow lakes and swamps. Plant species documented from Lake Ptolemy include Acacia and Tamarix species, as well as Balanitos aegyptiaca and Capparis decidua. The various water systems aided in the propagation of plants. Reed vegetation formed on the southern and western shores of the lake, and probably extended over its entire perimeter and sometimes into open water. The existence of Typha suggests that shallow lake phases occurred. Microbialites and stromatolites also formed on the lake shores and together with limnites are used to delimit the lake surface.

Ostracods found in the lake include Candonopsis, Cyprideis, Cypridopsis, Cyprilla, Darwinula, Herpetocypris and Limnocytherae. In some places, diatoms were widespread enough to form diatomite deposits.

About 10-18 fish species existed in Lake Ptolemy, such as Clarias lazera, Lates niloticus and Synodontis. Likewise, fossils of land tortoises, water tortoises and hippopotamus were found on the area of the former lake. The existence of marsh animals in the region was already reported in the map of 1858. Further animals documented in fossils include the Nile crocodile and pelomedusidae and trionychidae species. Bees, molluscs and worms were active in the lake sediments, while alcelaphinae, elephants, giraffes, other ungulates as well as other animals such as cane rats lived around the lake.

The south shore of Lake Ptolemy could have been inhabited by neolithic pastoralists, while the swampy conditions at the northern margin rendered it presumably inhospitable. In addition, many human artifacts have been found in the region surrounding the former lake, some of which may have had religious-spiritual significance. As the lake levels decreased, populations migrated deeper into the lake basin.

== Lake chronology ==
The lake basin was probably formed before the Holocene by wind-driven erosion. During the Pleistocene, a "Lake Sidiq" formed in the area of northern Lake Ptolemy. It has been dated at 21,600 ± 600 years before present, while no lake deposits are found dating back to the late Pleistocene; climate at that point was as dry as the present day.

Lake Ptolemy existed as a freshwater lake already around 9,180 ± 185 years before present. A temporary low water level is dated to 7,470 ± 100 and 8,100 ± 80 years before present. This lowstand was associated with strong trophic growth; lowstands in the lake levels allowed land animals to reach the interior of the lake basin. Radiocarbon dating of chalks in a wadi that entered the lake from the north has yielded ages for a highstand of 6,680 ± 135 and 6,810 ± 70 years before present. Other dates from the northern reaches are 7,900 – 6,400 years before present, and 9,250 – 3,800 years before present. Dates obtained from fish fossils in the northern reaches are 2,360 ± 65 and 3,285 ± 70 years before present, during times where lake levels were less stable. No actual drying events are preserved in the fossil data.

Wadis flowing into the lake were transporting water as late as 3,300 – 2,900 and 3,300 – 2,400 years before present on the southern and northern side, respectively. During its drying, the lake split into separate pools. Deflation has removed the youngest deposits, thus the exact time when the lake disappeared is not known. Today wind-driven erosion is the dominant process in the area; the northeasterly trade winds have formed sand deposits including barchans on the southwestern side of the former lake.

== Relationship to groundwater and ecosystems ==
Lake Ptolemy is related to the Nubian Sandstone Aquifer; in simulations maximum water levels in the aquifer reached the surface of the lake, and about 3 cubic kilometres (0.72 cu mi) of water from the lake entered the aquifer every year. The lake further aided in the interchange between Lake Chad and Nile species.

== See also ==
- African humid period – Holocene climate period during which northern Africa was wetter than today

== Bibliography ==
- Elsheikh, Ahmed; Abdelsalam, Mohamed G.; Mickus, Kevin (1 August 2011). "Geology and geophysics of the West Nubian Paleolake and the Northern Darfur Megalake (WNPL–NDML): Implication for groundwater resources in Darfur, northwestern Sudan". Journal of African Earth Sciences. 61 (1): 82–93. Bibcode:2011JAfES..61...82E. doi:10.1016/j.jafrearsci.2011.05.004.
- Ghoneim, E.; El-Baz, F. (20 November 2007). "DEM-optical-radar data integration for palaeohydrological mapping in the northern Darfur, Sudan: implication for groundwater exploration". International Journal of Remote Sensing. 28 (22): 5001–5018. Bibcode:2007IJRS...28.5001G. doi:10.1080/01431160701266818. ISSN 0143-1161. S2CID 88510033.
- Gossel, W.; Ebraheem, A. M.; Wycisk, P. (1 December 2004). "A very large scale GIS-based groundwater flow model for the Nubian sandstone aquifer in Eastern Sahara (Egypt, northern Sudan and eastern Libya)". Hydrogeology Journal. 12 (6): 698–713. Bibcode:2004HydJ...12..698G. doi:10.1007/s10040-004-0379-4. ISSN 1431-2174. S2CID 128894657.
- Hoelzmann, Philipp; Keding, Birgit; Berke, Hubert; Kröpelin, Stefan; Kruse, Hans-Joachim (15 May 2001). "Environmental change and archaeology: lake evolution and human occupation in the Eastern Sahara during the Holocene". Palaeogeography, Palaeoclimatology, Palaeoecology. 169 (3–4): 193–217. Bibcode:2001PPP...169..193H. doi:10.1016/S0031-0182(01)00211-5.
- Kropelin, S (2009). "Holozäne Umweltrekonstruktion und Kulturgeschichte der Sahara: Perspektiven aus der sudanesischen Wüste" (PDF). Nova Acta Leopoldina (in German). 108: 165–191.
- Pachur, Hans-Joachim (April 1997). "Der Ptolemäus-See in Westnubien als Paläoklimaindikator". Petermanns Geographische Mitteilungen (in German) (141): 227–250.
- Pachur, Hans-Joachim; Altmann, Norbert (2006). Die Ostsahara im Spätquartär (in German). Springer Berlin Heidelberg. doi:10.1007/978-3-540-47625-2. ISBN 978-3-540-47625-2.
- Quade, J.; Dente, E.; Armon, M.; Dor, Y. Ben; Morin, E.; Adam, O.; Enzel, Y. (2018). "Megalakes in the Sahara? A Review". Quaternary Research. 90 (2): 9–11. Bibcode:2018QuRes..90..253Q. doi:10.1017/qua.2018.46. ISSN 0033-5894.
