= Potamocypris arcuata =

- Carapace and valves of Potamocypris arcuata

Scientific classification
- Kingdom: Animalia
- Phylum: Arthropoda
- Class: Ostracoda
- Order: Podocopida
- Family: Cyprididae
- Genus: Potamocypris
- Species: P. arcuata

Binomial name
- Potamocypris arcuata (Sars, 1903) G.W. Müller, 1912

Species of seed shrimp

Potamocypris arcuata is a species of ostracod crustacean in the family Cyprididae, subfamily Cypridopsinae. It is mainly known from the southern areas of the Palaearctic.

== Description ==
The carapace of P. arcuata is laterally compressed and approximately kidney-shaped in lateral view. The valve surface is covered with tiny pits and dense setae. Colour: pale green with a dark green dorsal blob. The length of carapace ranges from 0.50 to 0.81 mm. The second antennae carry swimming setae that extend beyond the tips of the terminal claws.

== Reproduction ==
Bisexual populations (with males and females) are reported from North Africa only. All other known populations consist of females only and are therefore inferred to reproduce by parthenogenesis.

== Literature ==
- Martens, Koen; Savatenalinton, Sukonthip (2011-04-29). "A subjective checklist of the Recent, free-living, non-marine Ostracoda (Crustacea)". Zootaxa. 2855 (1): 1–79. doi:10.11646/zootaxa.2855.1.1. ISSN 1175-5334.
- Meisch, C. 1985. Revision of the Recent West European Species of the Genus Potamocypris. Part II. Species with long swimming setae on the second antennae. Travaux scientifiques du Musée d'histoire naturelle de Luxembourg 6: 67–72.
- Meisch, C., 2000. Freshwater Ostracoda of Western and Central Europe. Spektrum Akademischer Verlag, Heidelberg, Berlin. 522 p.
