= Potamocypris unicaudata =

Scientific classification
- Domain: Eukaryota
- Kingdom: Animalia
- Phylum: Arthropoda
- Class: Ostracoda
- Order: Podocopida
- Family: Cyprididae
- Genus: Potamocypris
- Species: P. unicaudata

Binomial name
- Potamocypris unicaudata Schäfer, 1943

Species of seed shrimp

Potamocypris unicaudata is a species of ostracod crustacean in the family Cyprididae, subfamily Cypridopsinae. It is abundantly found in ditches and ponds near the sea shore, where freshwater slightly mingles with sea water. It is known from both Europe and North America.

== Description ==
The carapace of P. unicaudata is sub-reniform in shape and laterally compressed. The valve surface appears smooth in the stereomicroscope at magnifications of 20 to 60 x. In the scanning electron microscope, at magnifications of 500 x and above, tiny pits become visible.

The carapace length ranges from 0.70 to 0.85 mm. Colour: uniformly green to yellowish green.

The second antennae carry swimming setae distinctly extending beyond the tips of the terminal claws.

== Reproduction ==
No males of P. unicaudata have so far been found and it is therefore inferred that the species reproduces parthenogenetically.
