= Potamocypris smaragdina =

Scientific classification
- Domain: Eukaryota
- Kingdom: Animalia
- Phylum: Arthropoda
- Class: Ostracoda
- Order: Podocopida
- Family: Cyprididae
- Genus: Potamocypris
- Species: P. smaragdina

Binomial name
- Potamocypris smaragdina (Vávra, 1891)

Species of seed shrimp

Potamocypris smaragdina is a species of ostracod crustacean in the family Cyprididae, subfamily Cypridopsinae. It is known from both Europe and North America.

Potamocypris smaragdina colonizes (fish)ponds, lakes and slow flowing streams. It is one of the most common freshwater ostracods in the United States.

== Description ==
The carapace of P. smaragdina is subreniform in lateral view. Its valves are covered with stiff setae and small pits. The carapace size ranges from 0.60 to 0.79 mm. Colour: light green to yellowish green with two transverse green stripes.

The second antennae carry swimming setae that extend beyond the tips of the terminal claws.

== Reproduction ==
All known European populations consists of females only. In North America, both unisexual and bisexual populations have been recorded.
