= Cypricercus elegans =

Scientific classification
- Kingdom: Animalia
- Phylum: Arthropoda
- Class: Ostracoda
- Order: Podocopida
- Family: Cyprididae
- Genus: Cypricercus
- Species: C. elegans

Binomial name
- Cypricercus elegans (Roessler, 1986)

Synonyms
- Strandesia elegans Roessler, 1986

Species of seed shrimp

Cypricercus elegans is a species of freshwater ostracod in the family Cyprididae. It is found in Colombia.
