= Chlamydotheca elegans =

Scientific classification
- Domain: Eukaryota
- Kingdom: Animalia
- Phylum: Arthropoda
- Class: Ostracoda
- Order: Podocopida
- Family: Cyprididae
- Genus: Chlamydotheca
- Species: C. elegans

Binomial name
- Chlamydotheca elegans Roessler, 1986

Species of seed shrimp

Chlamydotheca elegans is a species of freshwater ostracods in the family Cyprididae. It is found in Colombia.
