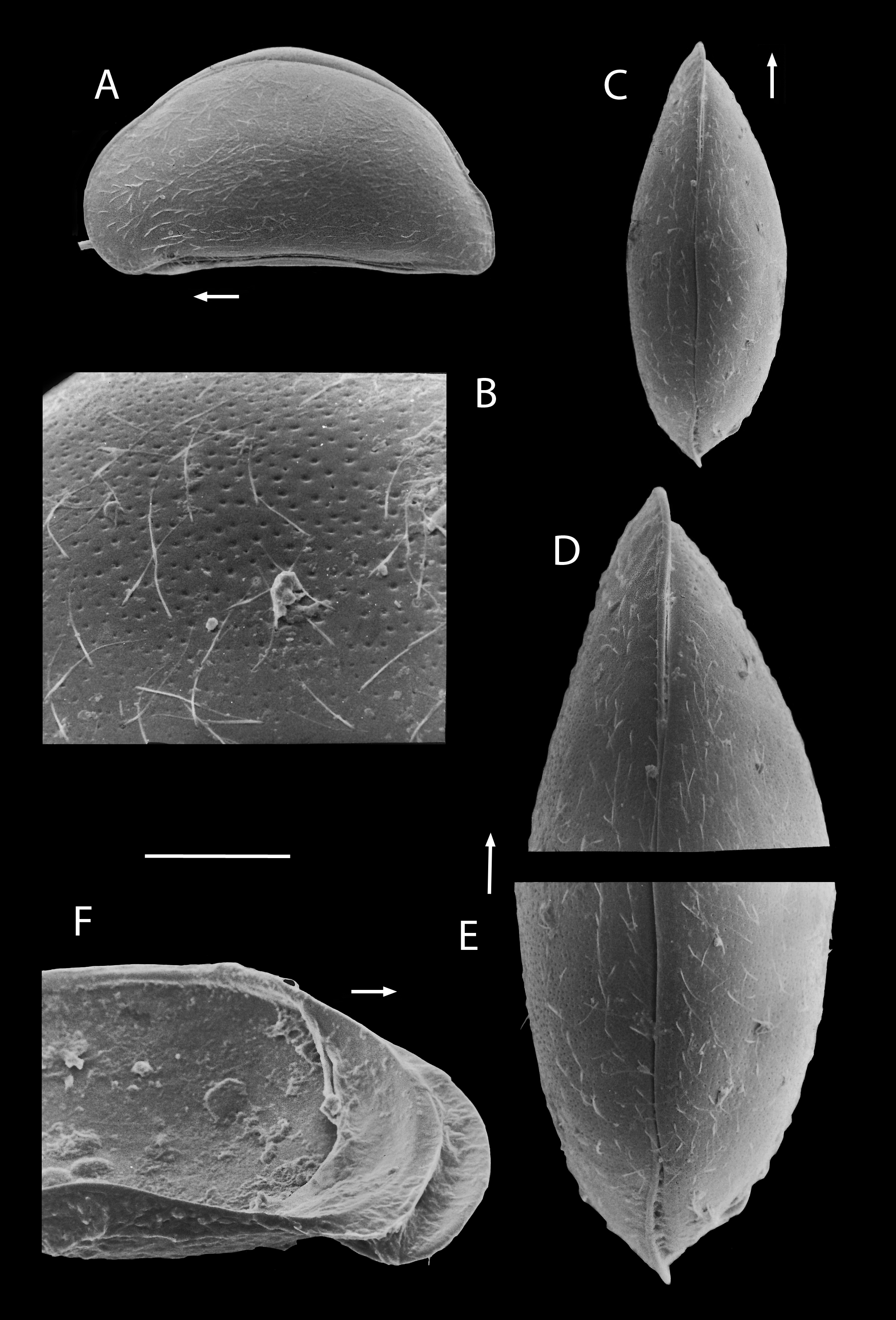
- Potamocypris mastigophora, North Macedonia

Scientific classification
- Domain: Eukaryota
- Kingdom: Animalia
- Phylum: Arthropoda
- Class: Ostracoda
- Order: Podocopida
- Family: Cyprididae
- Genus: Potamocypris
- Species: P. mastigophora

Binomial name
- Potamocypris mastigophora Methuén, 1910

= Potamocypris mastigophora =

Species of seed shrimp

Potamocypris mastigophora is a species of ostracod crustacean in the family Cyprididae, subfamily Cypridopsinae. It is known from Africa and the southern areas of the Palaearctic.

== Description ==
The carapace of P. mastigophora is laterally compressed, with length ranging from 0.55 to 0.64 mm. The left valve bears wide anterior and posterior flanges. The second antennae carry swimming setae that extend beyond the tips of the terminal claws. The males are unknown, all known populations reproducing through parthenogenesis.
