= Potamocypris steueri =

Scientific classification
- Domain: Eukaryota
- Kingdom: Animalia
- Phylum: Arthropoda
- Class: Ostracoda
- Order: Podocopida
- Family: Cyprididae
- Genus: Potamocypris
- Species: P. steueri

Binomial name
- Potamocypris steueri Klie, 1935

Species of seed shrimp

Potamocypris steueri is a species of ostracod crustaceans in the family Cyprididae, subfamily Cypridopsinae found in marine brackish waters of the Mediterranean Basin as well as in brackish coastal waters of the Black Sea and the Caspian Sea.

== Description ==
The carapace of P. steueri appears subovate in lateral view. It is light green with four dark green transverse stripes. The length ranges from 0.55 to 0.68 mm, with females being slightly larger than males.

The second antennae carry swimming setae that slightly extend beyond the tips of the terminal claws.
