= Potamocypris variegata =

Scientific classification
- Domain: Eukaryota
- Kingdom: Animalia
- Phylum: Arthropoda
- Class: Ostracoda
- Order: Podocopida
- Family: Cyprididae
- Genus: Potamocypris
- Species: P. variegata

Binomial name
- Potamocypris variegata (Brady & Norman, 1889)

Species of seed shrimp

Potamocypris variegata is a species of ostracod crustaceans in the family Cyprididae, subfamily Cypridopsinae. It is mainly found in ponds with rich aquatic vegetation, more rarely in slowly flowing streams. The species is distributed throughout Europe, but is also known from North America.

== Description ==
The carapace of P. variegata is reniform in shape. The carapace length ranges from 0.46 to 0.56 mm. Colour: yellowish green with two dark green transverse stripes.

The second antennae carry swimming setae distinctly extending beyond the tips of the terminal claws.
