= Potamocypris =

Scientific classification
- Domain: Eukaryota
- Kingdom: Animalia
- Phylum: Arthropoda
- Class: Ostracoda
- Order: Podocopida
- Family: Cyprididae
- Subfamily: Cypridopsinae
- Genus: Potamocypris; Brady, 1870

Genus of seed shrimps

Potamocypris is a genus of ostracod crustaceans in the family Cyprididae. There are currently 44 extant species of Potamocypris. The majority of the species occur in freshwater habitats; only a few species of the genus (e.g., Potamocypris steueri) colonize marine brackish coastal waters.

== Species ==
- Potamocypris alveolata
- Potamocypris arcuata
- Potamocypris bituminicola
- Potamocypris bowmani
- Potamocypris brachychaeta
- Potamocypris chelazzii
- Potamocypris comosa
- Potamocypris dadayi
- Potamocypris deflexa
- Potamocypris dorsomarginata
- Potamocypris elegantula
- Potamocypris fallax
- Potamocypris fulva
- Potamocypris gibbula
- Potamocypris humilis
- Potamocypris hummelincki
- Potamocypris illinoisensis
- Potamocypris insularis
- Potamocypris islagrandensis
- Potamocypris koenikei
- Potamocypris lobata
- Potamocypris mastigophora
- Potamocypris narayanani
- Potamocypris ombrophila
- Potamocypris pallida
- Potamocypris paludum
- Potamocypris philotherma
- Potamocypris problematica
- Potamocypris reticulata
- Potamocypris saskatchewanensis
- Potamocypris schubarti
- Potamocypris similis
- Potamocypris smaragdina
- Potamocypris steueri
- Potamocypris stewarti
- Potamocypris sudzukii
- Potamocypris unicaudata
- Potamocypris variegata
- Potamocypris villosa
- Potamocypris worthingtoni
- Potamocypris zschokkei
