= Callimicra festiva =

Scientific classification
- Domain: Eukaryota
- Kingdom: Animalia
- Phylum: Arthropoda
- Class: Insecta
- Order: Coleoptera
- Suborder: Polyphaga
- Infraorder: Elateriformia
- Family: Buprestidae
- Subfamily: Agrilinae
- Tribe: Tracheini
- Genus: Callimicra
- Species: C. festiva

Binomial name
- Callimicra festiva Fisher, 1925

Species of beetle

Callimicra festiva is a species of metallic wood-boring beetle in the family Buprestidae.
