= Heterocypris =

Scientific classification
- Domain: Eukaryota
- Kingdom: Animalia
- Phylum: Arthropoda
- Class: Ostracoda
- Order: Podocopida
- Family: Cyprididae
- Genus: Heterocypris; Claus, 1892

Genus of seed shrimps

Heterocypris is a genus of ostracods belonging to the family Cyprididae.

The genus has cosmopolitan distribution.

Species:

- Heterocypris americana (Cushman, 1905)
- Heterocypris antillensis Broodbakker, 1982
