= Zonocypretta =

Conservation status
- Vulnerable (IUCN 2.3)

Scientific classification
- Kingdom: Animalia
- Phylum: Arthropoda
- Class: Ostracoda
- Order: Podocopida
- Family: Cyprididae
- Subfamily: Bradycypridinae
- Genus: Zonocypretta; De Deckker, 1981
- Species: Z. kalimna

Binomial name
- Zonocypretta kalimna De Deckker, 1981

Genus of seed shrimps

Zonocypretta kalimna is a species of ostracod crustacean in the family Cyprididae. It is the only species in the genus Zonocypretta. It is endemic to Australia.
