= Bennelongia =

Scientific classification
- Kingdom: Animalia
- Phylum: Arthropoda
- Class: Ostracoda
- Order: Podocopida
- Family: Cyprididae
- Subfamily: Cypridinae
- Genus: Bennelongia; De Deckker & McKenzie, 1981

Genus of seed shrimps

Bennelongia is a genus of ostracod crustaceans in the family Cyprididae. It is probably endemic to Australia and New Zealand, and is predicted to be highly diverse. The genus was described in 1981 and named after Woollarawarre Bennelong, the first aboriginal to have a long association with the early European settlers of Australia. Prior to 2012, six species were described in Australia. There are currently 15 species of Bennelongia. Bennelongia may be the last true descendant genus of the Mesozoic (and now extinct) lineage of Cypridea, which was a dominant lineage of ostracod in non-marine waters in the Cretaceous.

== See also ==
- Bennelongia australis (Brady, 1886) – South Australia
- Bennelongia barangaroo De Deckker, 1981 – Western Australia
- Bennelongia calei Martens et al 2013 – Western Australia
- Bennelongia bidgelongensis Martens et al., 2012 – Western Australia, Gascoyne
- Bennelongia coondinerensis Martens et al., 2012 – Western Australia, Pilbara
- Bennelongia cuensis Martens et al., 2012 – Western Australia, Yilgarn
- Bennelongia cygnus Martens et al., 2012 – Western Australia, Swan Valley
- Bennelongia frumenta Martens et al., 2012 – Western Australia, Wheatbelt
- Bennelongia gwelupensis Martens et al., 2012 – Western Australia, Perth, southwest coast
- Bennelongia harpago De Deckker & McKenzie, 1981 – Queensland (type species)
- Bennelongia kimberleyensis Martens et al., 2012 – Western Australia, Kimberley
- Bennelongia lata Martens et al., 2012 – Western Australia, Gascoyne–Murchison region
- Bennelongia nimala De Deckker, 1981 – Northern Territory
- Bennelongia pinpi De Deckker, 1981 – Queensland
- Bennelongia strellyensis Martens et al., 2012 – Western Australia, Pilbara
- Bennelongia tunta De Deckker, 1982 – Queensland
