= Ilyocypris =

Scientific classification
- Kingdom: Animalia
- Phylum: Arthropoda
- Clade: Pancrustacea
- Class: Ostracoda
- Order: Podocopida
- Family: Cyprididae
- Genus: Ilyocypris; Brady & Norman, 1889

Genus of seed shrimps

Ilyocypris is a genus of ostracods, also called "seed shrimp." belonging to the family Cyprididae. These crustaceans are usually smaller than a millimetre and live in freshwater environments such as lakes, swamps, rivers, sand streams. Their fossils help paleontologists determine things like the saltiness of water and time period.

The genus has cosmopolitan distribution.

Species:

- Ilyocypris alta Sars, 1910
- Ilyocypris arvadensis Swain
