= Scottia (crustacean) =

Scientific classification
- Kingdom: Animalia
- Phylum: Arthropoda
- Clade: Pancrustacea
- Class: Ostracoda
- Order: Podocopida
- Family: Cyprididae
- Subfamily: Scottiinae
- Genus: Scottia; G. S. Brady & Norman, 1889

Species
- See text

Synonyms
- Scottiana Carus, 1890

Genus of seed shrimps

Scottia is a genus of ostracods in the family Cyprididae.

== Species ==
Extant species:

- Scottia audax
- Scottia birigida
- Scottia insularis
- Scottia pseudobrowniana

Fossil species:

- †Scottia bonei
- †Scottia browniana
- †Scottia candonaeformis
- †Scottia dacica
- †Scottia kempfi
- †Scottia tumida
