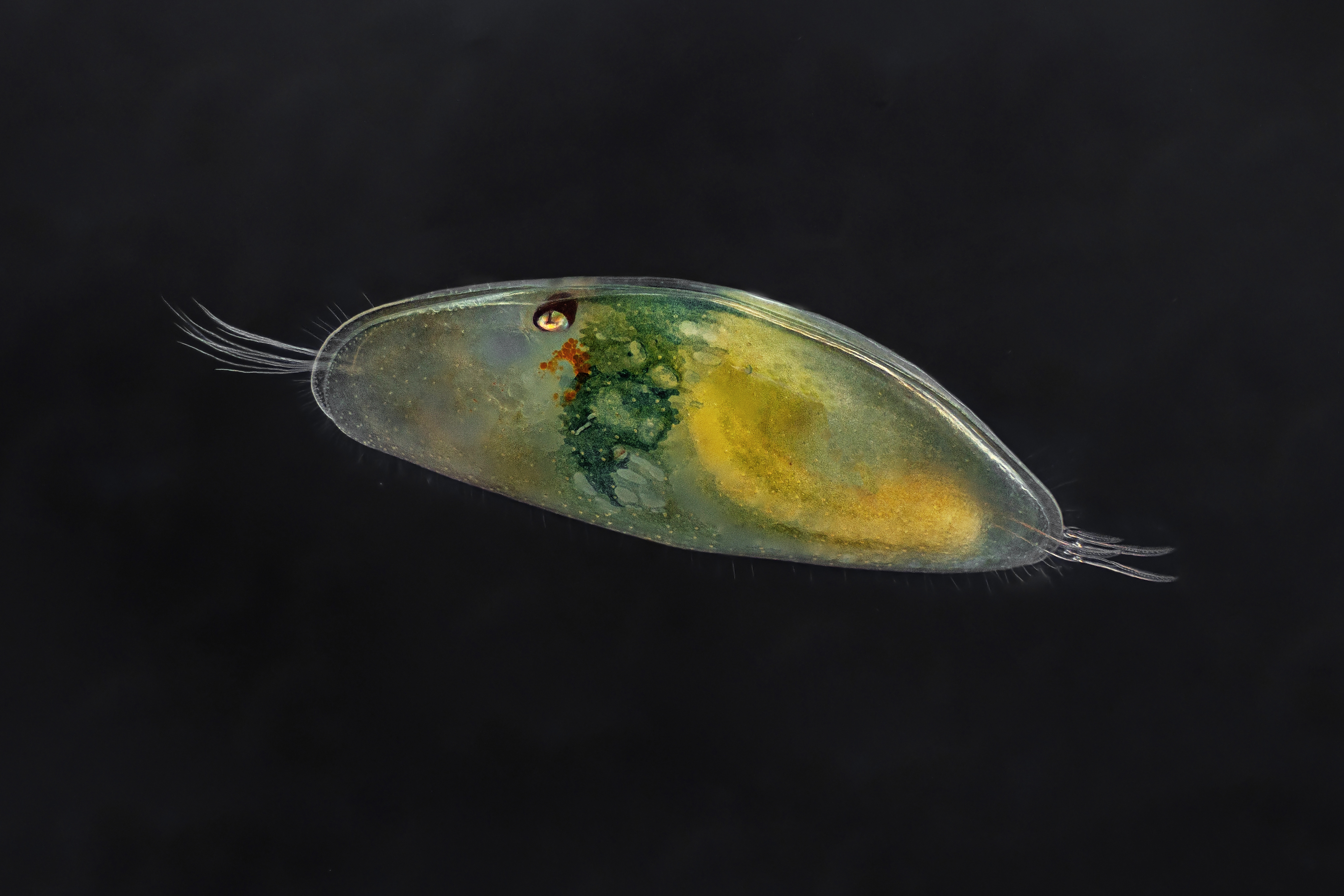
- Dolerocypris fasciata in Estonia

Scientific classification
- Kingdom: Animalia
- Phylum: Arthropoda
- Class: Ostracoda
- Order: Podocopida
- Family: Cyprididae
- Genus: Dolerocypris; Kaufmann, 1900

= Dolerocypris =

Genus of seed shrimps

Dolerocypris is a genus of ostracods belonging to the family Cyprididae.

The species of this genus are found in Europe and Northern America.

Species:

- Dolerocypris fasciata (Müller, 1776)
- Dolerocypris ikeyai Smith & Kamiya, 2006
