= Cypricercus =

Scientific classification
- Domain: Eukaryota
- Kingdom: Animalia
- Phylum: Arthropoda
- Class: Ostracoda
- Order: Podocopida
- Family: Cyprididae
- Subfamily: Cypricercinae
- Genus: Cypricercus; G. O.Sars, 1895

Species
- Cypricercus affinis; Cypricercus cuneatus (type); Cypricercus elegans; Cypricercus horridus; Cypricercus inermis; Cypricercus maculatus; Cypricercus salinus; Cypricercus setosus; Cypricercus unicornis; Cypricercus vietsi

Genus of seed shrimps

Cypricercus is a genus of ostracods in the family Cyprididae.
