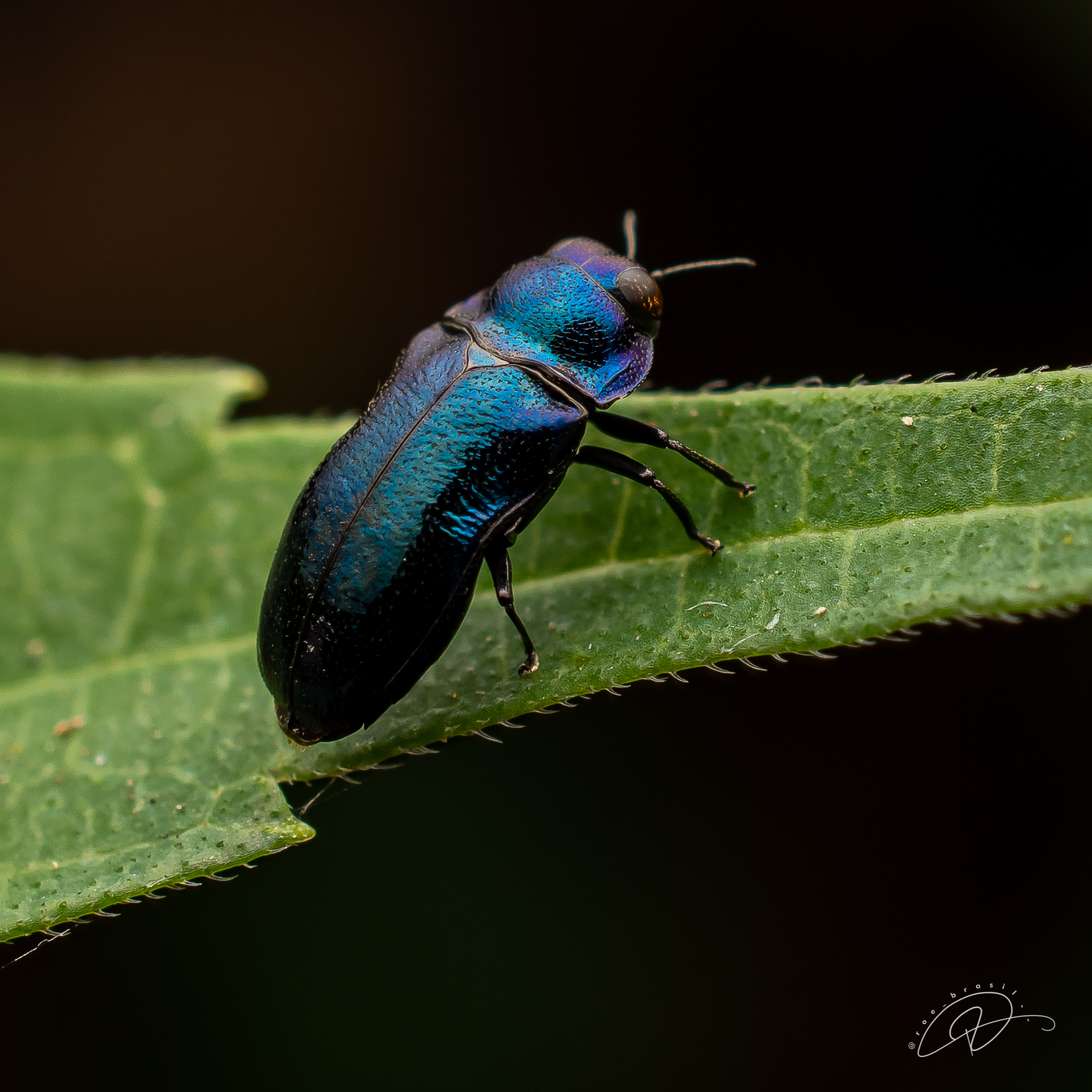
- Callimicra, Brazil

Scientific classification
- Kingdom: Animalia
- Phylum: Arthropoda
- Class: Insecta
- Order: Coleoptera
- Suborder: Polyphaga
- Infraorder: Elateriformia
- Family: Buprestidae
- Tribe: Tracheini
- Genus: Callimicra; Deyrolle, 1864

Synonyms
- Bakerietta Obenberger, 1932; Callimicra Dejean, 1833

= Callimicra =

Genus of beetles

Callimicra is a genus of Jewel Beetles in the beetle family Buprestidae. There are at least 60 described species in Callimicra, found in Mexico, Central America, and South America.

== Species ==
These 60 species belong to the genus Callimicra:

- Callimicra acuminata Fisher, 1925
- Callimicra amicalis Obenberger, 1932
- Callimicra angustula Waterhouse, 1889
- Callimicra bartoni Obenberger, 1932
- Callimicra bicolor (Gory & Laporte, 1839)
- Callimicra bifasciata Obenberger, 1922
- Callimicra bourgeoisi Kerremans, 1914
- Callimicra brasiliensis Obenberger, 1922
- Callimicra brevis (Gory & Laporte, 1839)
- Callimicra breviuscula Waterhouse, 1889
- Callimicra bruchi Obenberger, 1922
- Callimicra bruchiana Obenberger, 1937
- Callimicra caesarea Obenberger, 1932
- Callimicra chloroptera Obenberger, 1932
- Callimicra chrysicollis Obenberger, 1922
- Callimicra collaris Kerremans, 1900
- Callimicra coraeboides Kerremans, 1899
- Callimicra cuprea Kerremans, 1897
- Callimicra cyanea Kerremans, 1897
- Callimicra cyanescens Fisher, 1933
- Callimicra cyanipennis Kerremans, 1899
- Callimicra cyanoptera Fisher, 1925
- Callimicra cylindera Kerremans, 1903
- Callimicra darwini Hespenheide, 1980
- Callimicra difficilis Obenberger, 1922
- Callimicra dimidiata Waterhouse, 1889
- Callimicra elongata Kerremans, 1896
- Callimicra embrikina Obenberger, 1936
- Callimicra festiva Fisher, 1925
- Callimicra frontalis Obenberger, 1922
- Callimicra hoscheki Obenberger, 1922
- Callimicra ignobilis (Kirsch, 1873)
- Callimicra iheringi Obenberger, 1932
- Callimicra inca Kerremans, 1899
- Callimicra janthinula Obenberger, 1932
- Callimicra longa Obenberger, 1922
- Callimicra lucidula Waterhouse, 1889
- Callimicra nigra Kerremans, 1897
- Callimicra obenbergeri Cobos, 1978
- Callimicra obscurepurpurascens Obenberger, 1938
- Callimicra occidentalis Obenberger, 1922
- Callimicra orchymonti Obenberger, 1937
- Callimicra paulensis Obenberger, 1922
- Callimicra peruviana Kerremans, 1899
- Callimicra pinguis Thomson, 1879
- Callimicra pygmaea Kerremans, 1900
- Callimicra riveti Kerremans, 1914
- Callimicra scapha Kerremans, 1896
- Callimicra scintillans Obenberger, 1932
- Callimicra scutellata Thomson, 1879
- Callimicra skrlandti Obenberger, 1932
- Callimicra stichai Obenberger, 1924
- Callimicra strandi Obenberger, 1922
- Callimicra subcyanea (Gory, 1841)
- Callimicra taciturna (Gory, 1841)
- Callimicra timialitha Thomson, 1879
- Callimicra vanrooni Obenberger, 1923
- Callimicra violaceipennis Waterhouse, 1889
- Callimicra viridifrons Fisher, 1925
- Callimicra viridis Kerremans, 1899
