= Chlamydotheca =

Scientific classification
- Domain: Eukaryota
- Kingdom: Animalia
- Phylum: Arthropoda
- Class: Ostracoda
- Order: Podocopida
- Family: Cyprididae
- Subfamily: Cypridinae
- Genus: Chlamydotheca (de Saussure, 1858)

Type species
- Takecallis arundicolens Mastumura, 1917

Diversity
- About 36 species

Genus of seed shrimps

Chlamydotheca is a genus of freshwater ostracods in the family Cyprididae. About 36 species are known to occur throughout continental waters. Four species are found in Argentina.

== Taxonomy ==
Once classified as Chlamydotheca australis is now accepted as a synonym for Bennelongia australis.

== Species ==
- Chlamydotheca azteca de Saussure, 1858
- Chlamydotheca elegans Roessler, 1986
- Chlamydotheca incisa Claus, 1892
- Chlamydotheca barbadensis Sharpe, 1910
- Chlamydotheca unispinosa (Baird, 1862)
- Chlamydotheca iheringi (Sars, 1901) Klie, 1931
- Chlamydotheca incisa (Claus, 1982)
- Chlamydotheca leuckarti
- Chlamydotheca symmetrica
- Chlamydotheca arcuata (Sars, 1901)
- Chlamydotheca llanoensis†
