= Cauarana =

Scientific classification
- Kingdom: Animalia
- Phylum: Arthropoda
- Clade: Pancrustacea
- Class: Insecta
- Order: Coleoptera
- Suborder: Polyphaga
- Infraorder: Cucujiformia
- Family: Cerambycidae
- Subfamily: Cerambycinae
- Genus: Cauarana; Lane, 1974
- Species: C. iheringi

Binomial name
- Cauarana iheringi (Gounelle, 1910)

Synonyms
- Rhatymoscelis iheringi Gounelle, 1910

Genus of beetles

Cauarana is a genus in the longhorn beetle family Cerambycidae. This genus has a single species, Cauarana iheringi. It is found in Brazil (Minas Gerais, Rio de Janeiro, São Paulo).
