= Eucypris =

Scientific classification
- Domain: Eukaryota
- Kingdom: Animalia
- Phylum: Arthropoda
- Class: Ostracoda
- Order: Podocopida
- Family: Cyprididae
- Genus: Eucypris; Vávra, 1891

Genus of seed shrimps

Eucypris is a genus of ostracods belonging to the family Cyprididae.

The genus has cosmopolitan distribution.

Species:

- Eucypris accipitrina Anichini Pini, 1968
- Eucypris anglica Fox, 1967
