= Herpetocypris =

Scientific classification
- Domain: Eukaryota
- Kingdom: Animalia
- Phylum: Arthropoda
- Class: Ostracoda
- Order: Podocopida
- Family: Cyprididae
- Genus: Herpetocypris; Brady & Norman, 1889

Genus of seed shrimps

Herpetocypris is a genus of ostracods belonging to the family Cyprididae.

The genus has cosmopolitan distribution.

Species:

- Herpetocypris amychos Krutak, 1975
- Herpetocypris bonettoi Ferguson
