= Cypridopsis =

Scientific classification
- Domain: Eukaryota
- Kingdom: Animalia
- Phylum: Arthropoda
- Class: Ostracoda
- Order: Podocopida
- Family: Cyprididae
- Genus: Cypridopsis; Brady, 1867

Synonyms
- Obliquocypris Malz, 1977

Genus of seed shrimps

Cypridopsis is a genus of ostracods, belonging to the family Cyprididae. The genus was described in 1867 by George Stewardson Brady and has cosmopolitan distribution.

Species include:

- Cypridopsis bamberi Henderson, 1986
- Cypridopsis elephantiasis Hu & Tao, 2008
- Cypridopsis sinensis Hu & Tao, 2008
