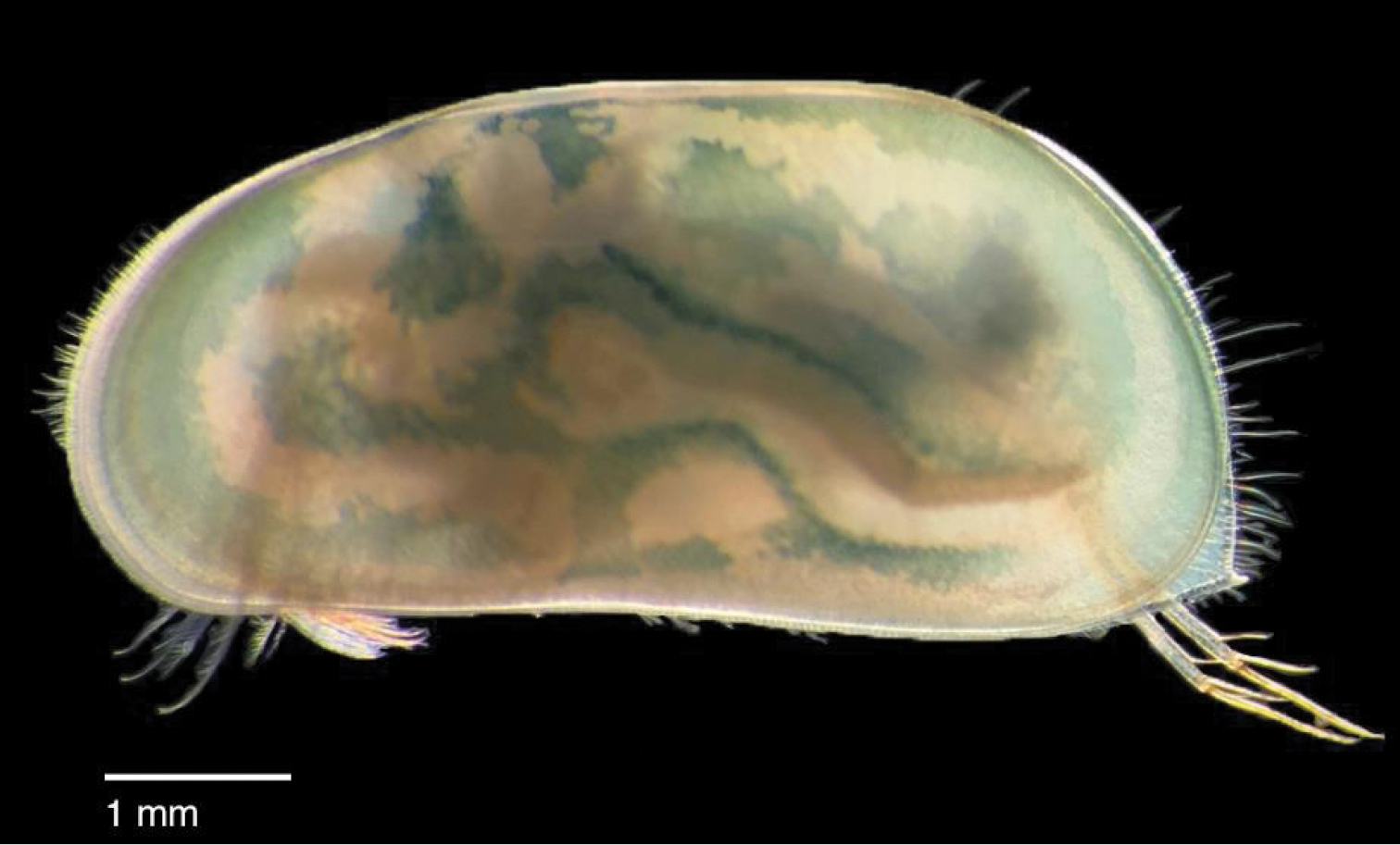
- Chlamydotheca unispinosa

Scientific classification
- Kingdom: Animalia
- Phylum: Arthropoda
- Clade: Pancrustacea
- Class: Ostracoda
- Order: Podocopida
- Superfamily: Cypridoidea
- Family: Cyprididae; Baird, 1845

Subfamilies
- Batucyprettinae; Bradycypridinae; Callistocypridinae; Cyprettinae; Cypricercinae; Cypridinae; Cypridopsinae; Cyprinotinae; Diacypridinae; Dolerocypridinae; Eucypridinae; Herpetocypridinae; Hungarocypridinae; Liocypridinae; Ngarawinae; Scottiinae; †Talicyprideinae

Synonyms
- Cypridae

= Cyprididae =

Family of seed shrimps

Cyprididae is "the most diverse group of freshwater ostracods". It contains over 1000 species, which represents 50% of the known species of freshwater ostracods (other speciose families include Candonidae, with 25%, and Limnocytheridae, with 10%). Around 60% of genera in the family are endemic to a single zoogeographic region. The family contains 16 subfamilies, and is most diverse in the Afrotropical realm, with over 300 species in 45 genera. Many Cyprididae occur in temporary water bodies and have drought-resistant eggs, mixed/parthenogenetic reproduction and ability to swim. These biological attributes pre-adapt them to form successful radiations in these habitats. Bennelongia is an interesting genus in the family Cyprididae. It may be the last true descendant of the Mesozoic (and now extinct) lineage of Cypridea, which was a dominant lineage of ostracod in non-marine waters in the Cretaceous.

== Taxonomy ==
The following genera are recognised in the family Cyprididae:

- Afrocypris Sars, 1924
- Arctocypris Petkovski, Scharf & Keyser, 2016
- Ampullacypris de Deckker, 1981
- Bennelongia De Deckker & McKenzie, 1981
- Bradleystrandesia Broodbakker, 1983
- Bradleytriebella Savatenalinton & Martens, 2009
- Brasacypris Krömmelbein, 1965 †
- Candocypria Furtos, 1933
- Candonocypris Sars, 1894
- Chlamydotheca Saussure, 1858
- Cypretta Vávra, 1895
- Cypria
- Cypridopsis Brady, 1867
- Cyprinotus Brady, 1886
- Cypris Müller, O. F., 1776
- Cypricercus G.O. Sars, 1895
- Diacypris Herbst, 1961
- Dolerocypris Kaufmann, 1900
- Eucypris
- Herpetocypris
- Heterocypris Claus, 1892
- Hungarocypris Vavra, 1906
- Ilyocypris Brady & Norman, 1889
- Kroemmelbeincypris Poropat & Colin, 2012 †
- Kunluniacypris Kempf, 2015
- Martenscypridopsis Karanovic, 2000
- Microcypris Kaufmann, 1900
- Mishinaella Kempf, 2017 †
- Mongolianella Mandelstam, 1956 †
- Neocypridopsis Klie, 1940
- Ngarawa de Deckker, 1979
- Pattersoncypris Bate, 1972 †
- Potamocypris Brady, 1870
- Pseudocypridopsis Karanovic, 1999
- Pseudoeucypris Schneider, 1957
- Reticypris McKenzie, 1978
- Riocypris Klie, 1935
- Sarscypridopsis McKenzie, 1977
- Scottia Brady & Norman, 1889
- Strandesia Stuhlmann, 1888
- Tanycypris Triebel, 1959
- Tucanocypris Krömmelbein, 1965 †
- Zonocypretta De Deckker, 1981
- Zonocypris Müller, G. W., 1898
